= Transport in Italy =

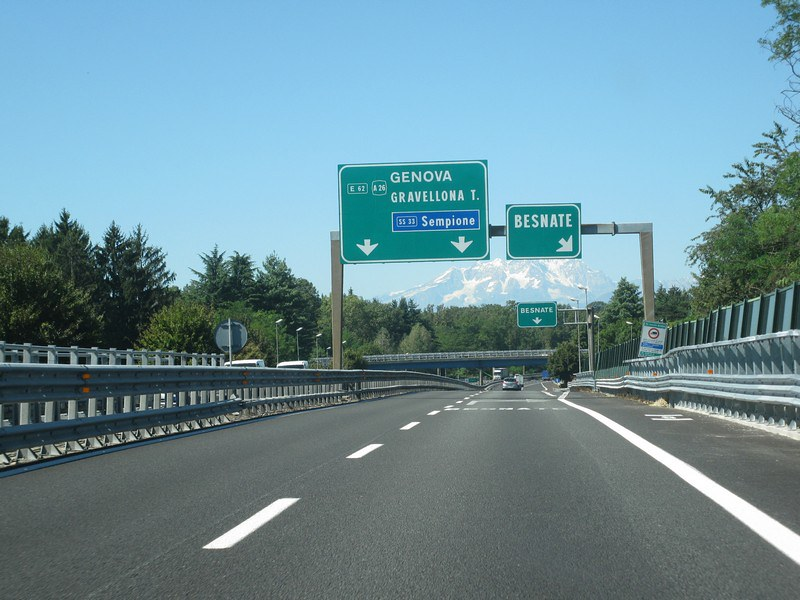
The Autostrada dei Laghi ("Lakes Motorway"; now parts of the Autostrada A8 and the Autostrada A9) near Besnate, the first motorway built in the world

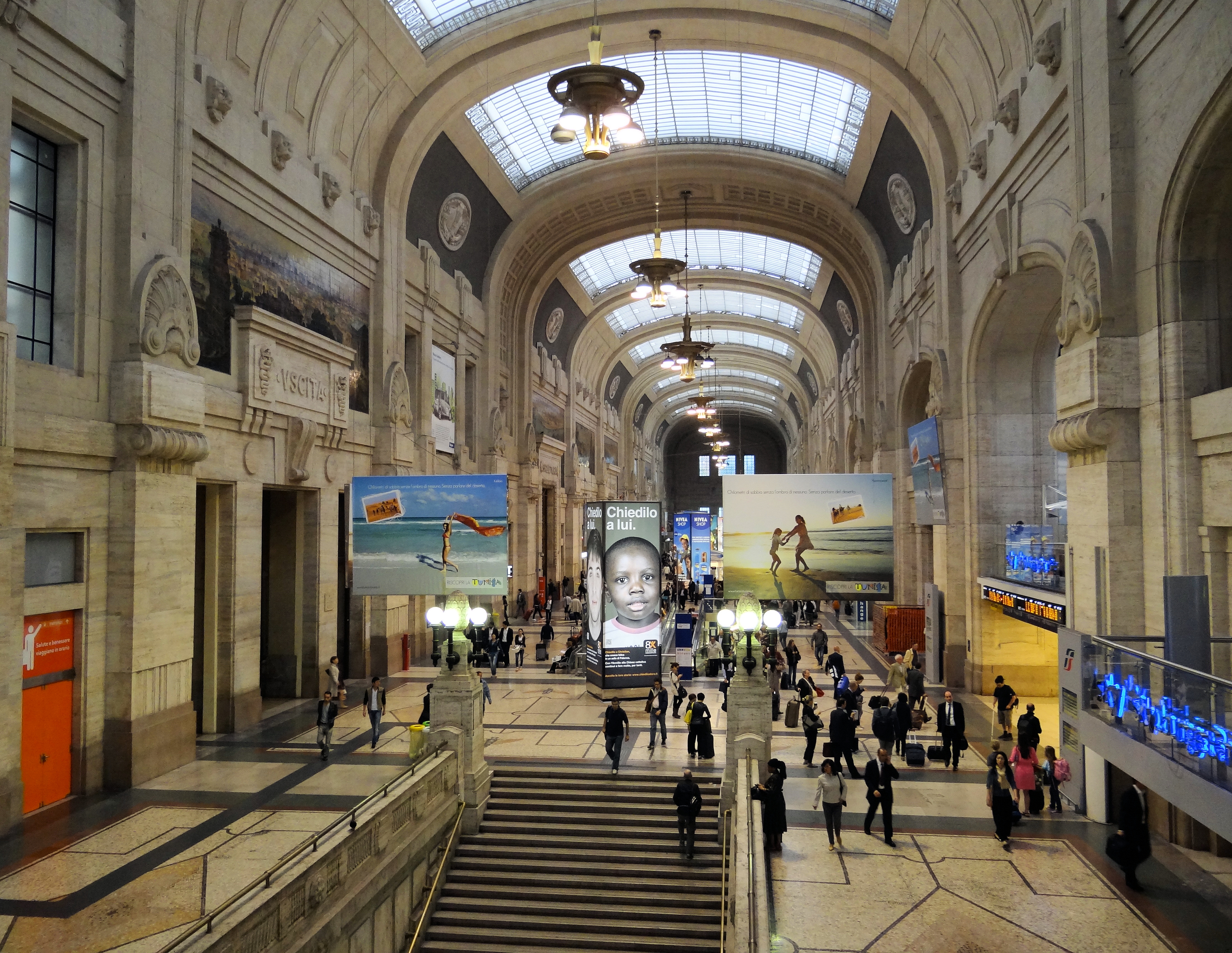
Milano Centrale railway station is the largest railway station in Europe by volume.

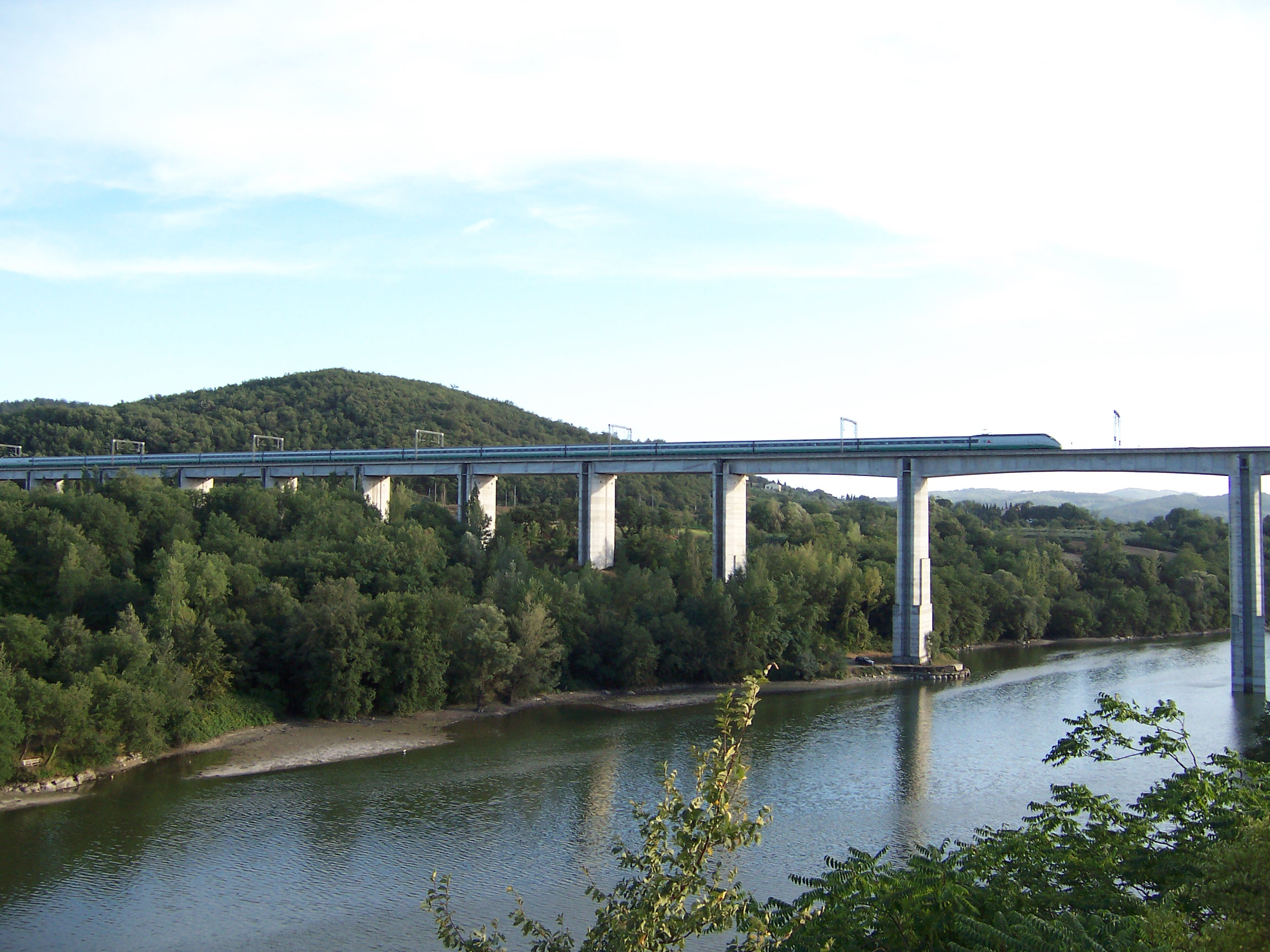
An ETR 500 train running on the Florence–Rome high-speed line near Arezzo, the first high-speed railway opened in Europe

Italy has a well developed transport infrastructure. The Italian rail network is extensive (16,723 km (10,391 mi)), especially in the north, and it includes a high-speed rail network that joins the major cities of Italy from Naples through northern cities such as Milan and Turin. The Florence–Rome high-speed railway was the first high-speed line opened in Europe when more than half of it opened in 1977. Italy has 2,507 people and 12.46 km^{2} per kilometer of rail track, giving Italy the world's thirteenth largest rail network. The Italian rail network is operated by state-owned Ferrovie dello Stato, while the rail tracks and infrastructure are managed by Rete Ferroviaria Italiana.

Italy's paved road network is also widespread, with a total length of about 487,700 km (303,000 mi). It comprises both an extensive motorway network (7,016 km (4,360 mi)), mostly toll roads, and national and local roads. Italy was the first country in the world to build motorways, the so-called autostrade, reserved for fast traffic and for motor vehicles only. The Autostrada dei Laghi ("Lakes Motorway"), the first built in the world, connecting Milan to Lake Como and Lake Maggiore, and now parts of the A8 and A9 motorways, was devised by Piero Puricelli and was inaugurated in 1924. The Strade Statali is the Italian national network of state highways. The total length for this network is about 25,000 km (16,000 mi). The routes of some state highways derive from ancient Roman roads, such as the Strada statale 7 Via Appia, which broadly follows the route of the Roman road of the same name.

Italy is the fifth in Europe by number of passengers by air transport, with about 148 million passengers or about 10% of the European total in 2011. In 2012 there were 130 airports in Italy, including the two hubs of Malpensa International Airport in Milan and Leonardo da Vinci International Airport in Rome. Since October 2021, Italy's flag carrier airline is ITA Airways, which took over the brand, the IATA ticketing code, and many assets belonging to the former flag carrier Alitalia, after its bankruptcy. The country also has regional airlines (such as Air Dolomiti), low-cost carriers, and Charter and leisure carriers (including Neos, Blue Panorama Airlines and Poste Air Cargo). Major Italian cargo operators are ITA Airways Cargo and Cargolux Italia.

Because of its long seacoast, Italy also has many harbors for the transportation of both goods and passengers. In 2004 there were 43 major seaports including the Port of Genoa, the country's largest and the third busiest by cargo tonnage in the Mediterranean Sea. Due to the increasing importance of the maritime Silk Road with its connections to Asia and East Africa, the Italian ports for Central and Eastern Europe have become important in recent years. In addition, the trade in goods is shifting from the European northern ports to the ports of the Mediterranean Sea due to the considerable time savings and environmental protection. In particular, the deep water port of Trieste in the northernmost part of the Mediterranean Sea is the target of Italian, Asian and European investments. Transport networks in Italy are integrated into the Trans-European Transport Networks.

== Railways ==
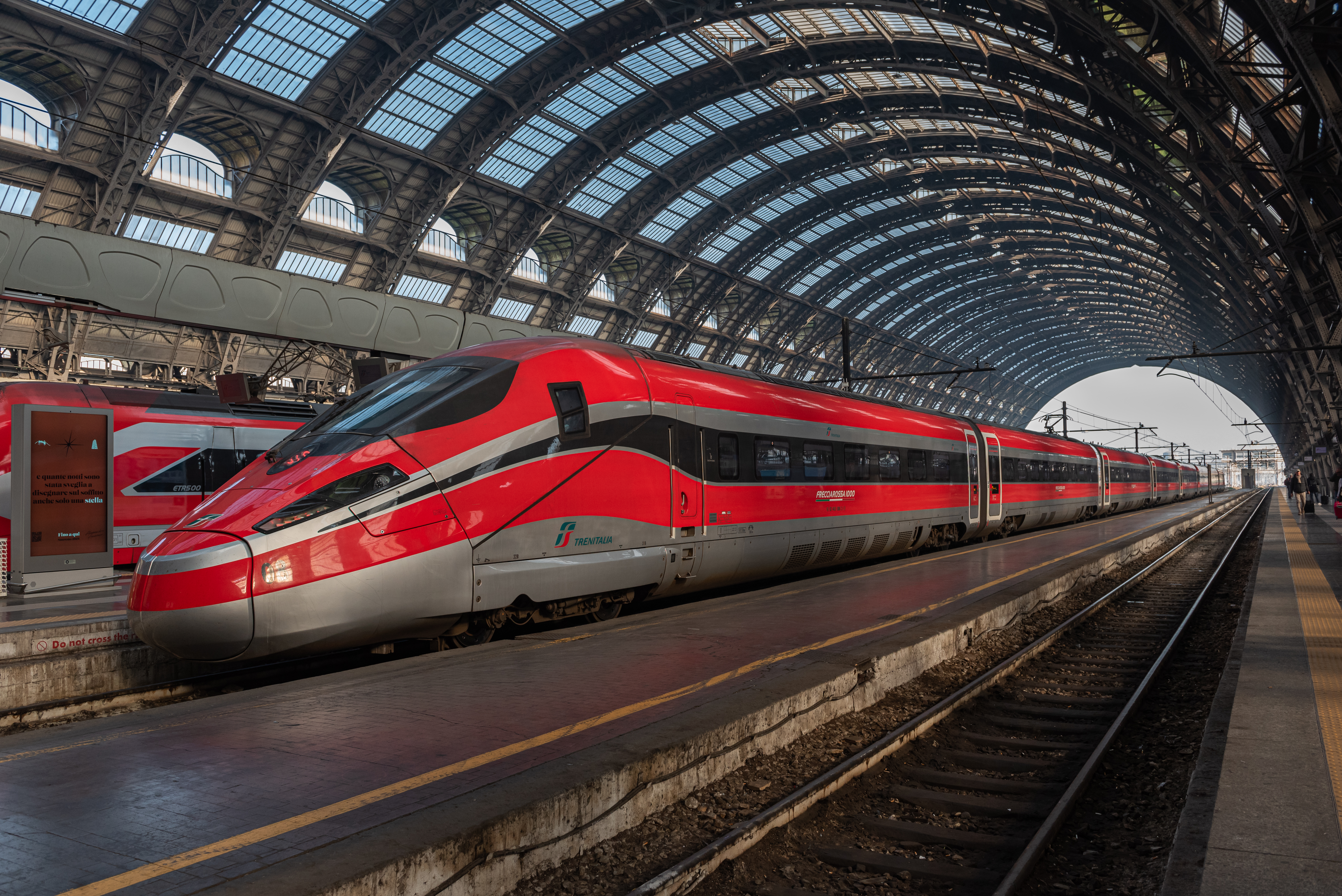
FS' Frecciarossa 1000 high speed train at Milano Centrale railway station, with a maximum speed of 400 km/h (249 mph), is one of the fastest trains in Europe.

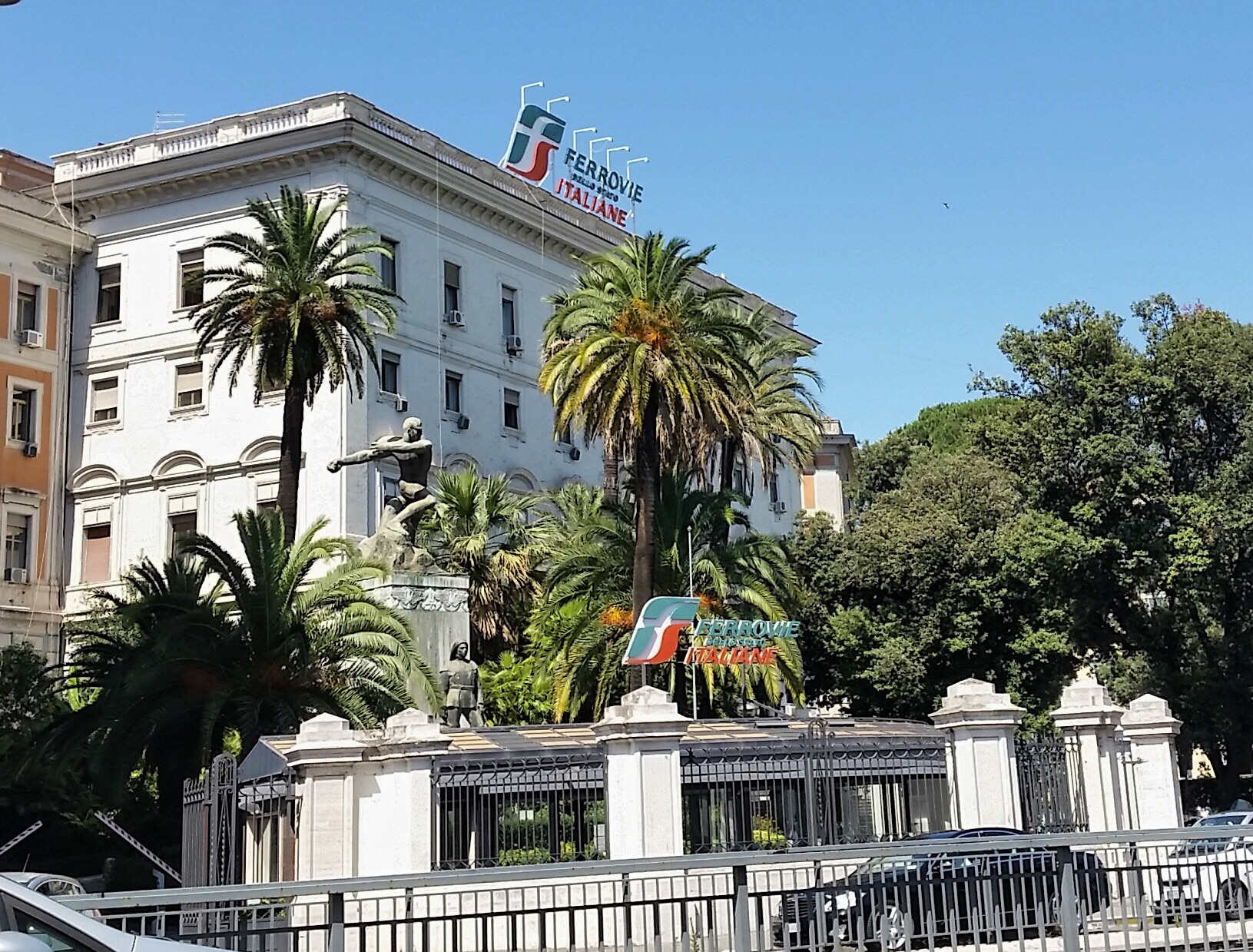
Head office of the Ferrovie dello Stato Italiane in Rome

The Italian rail network is extensive, especially in the north, and it includes a high-speed rail network that joins the major cities of Italy from Naples through northern cities such as Milan and Turin. Italy has 2,507 people and 12.46 km^{2} per kilometer of rail track, giving Italy the world's 13th largest rail network. Italy has 11 rail border crossings over the Alpine mountains with its neighbouring countries.

Higher-speed trains are divided into three categories: Frecciarossa (English: red arrow) trains operate at a maximum speed of 300 km/h (186 mph) on dedicated high-speed tracks; Frecciargento (English: silver arrow) trains operate at a maximum speed of 250 km/h (155 mph) on both high-speed and mainline tracks; and Frecciabianca (English: white arrow) trains operate on high-speed regional lines at a maximum speed of 200 km/h (124 mph).

The Italian railway system has a length of 19,394 km (12,051 mi), of which 18,071 km (11,229 mi) standard gauge and 11,322 km (7,035 mi) electrified. The active lines are 16,723 km (10,391 mi). The network is recently growing with the construction of the new high-speed rail network. The narrow gauge tracks are:

- 112 km (70 mi) of 1,000 mm (3 ft 3 3/8 in) gauge (all electrified);
- 1,211 km (752 mi) of 950 mm (3 ft 1 3/8 in) gauge (of which 153 km (95 mi) electrified).

A major part of the Italian rail network is managed and operated by Ferrovie dello Stato Italiane, a state owned company. Other regional agencies, mostly owned by public entities such as regional governments, operate on the Italian network. The rail tracks and infrastructure are managed by Rete Ferroviaria Italiana. The Italian railways are subsidised by the government, receiving €8.1 billion in 2009.

Travellers who often make use of the railway during their stay in Italy might use Rail Passes, such as the European Inter-Rail or Italy's national and regional passes. These rail passes allow travellers the freedom to use regional trains during the validity period, but all high-speed and intercity trains require a 10-euro reservation fee. Regional passes, such as "Io viaggio ovunque Lombardia", offer one-day, multiple-day and monthly period of validity. There are also saver passes for adults, who travel as a group, with savings up to 20%. Foreign travellers should purchase these passes in advance, so that the passes could be delivered by post prior to the trip. When using the rail passes, the date of travel needs to be filled in before boarding the trains.

=== High speed trains ===
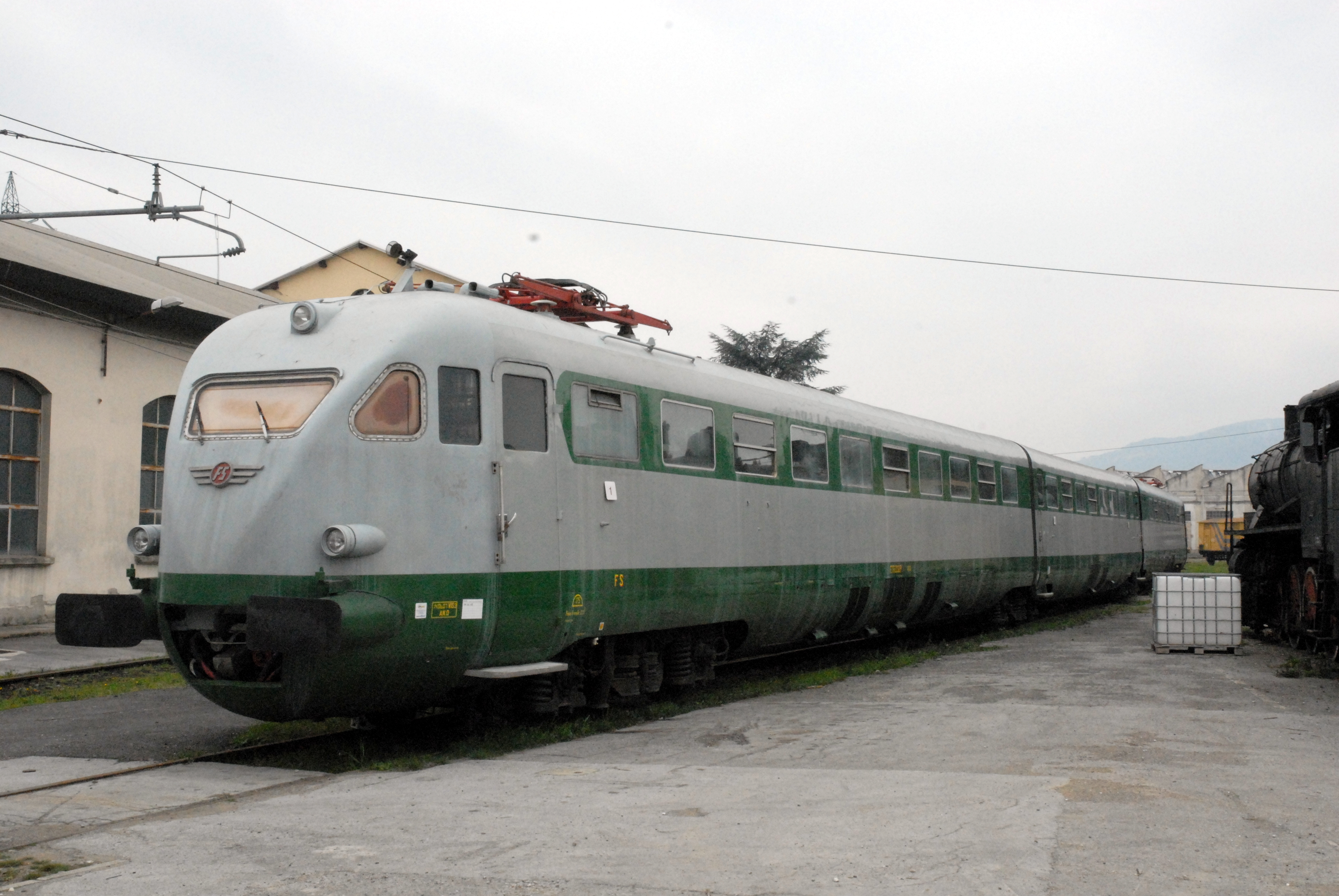
The original Italian ETR 200 trainset of the speed world record (203 km/h or 126 mph) in 1938, now preserved as historical train, was re-numbered ETR 232 in the 1960s

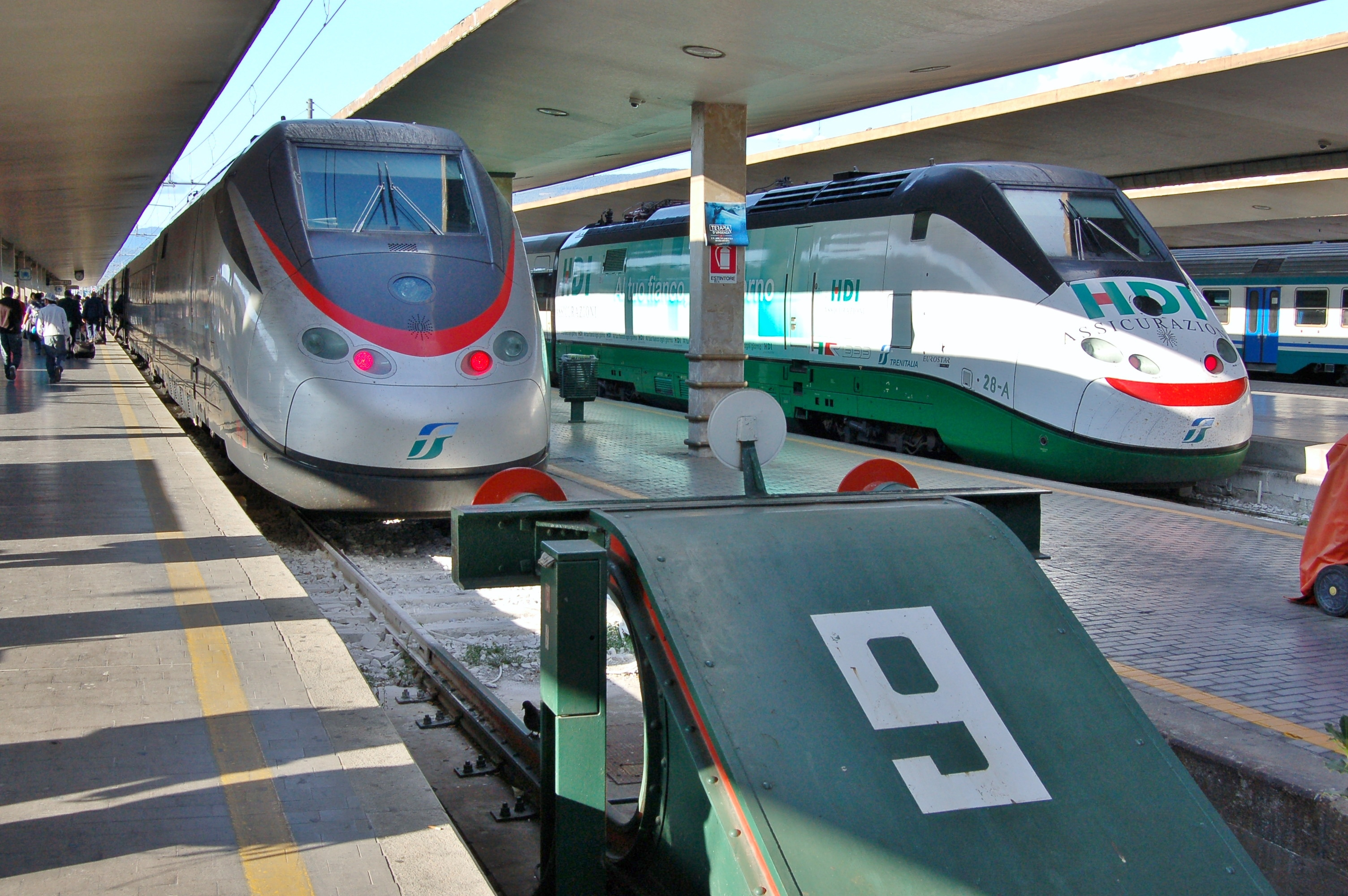
A pair of FS' ETR 500 at Firenze Santa Maria Novella railway station. The version ETR 500 Y1 achieved 362 km/h (225 mph) on the Bologna-Florence line on 4 February 2009, a new world speed record in a tunnel.

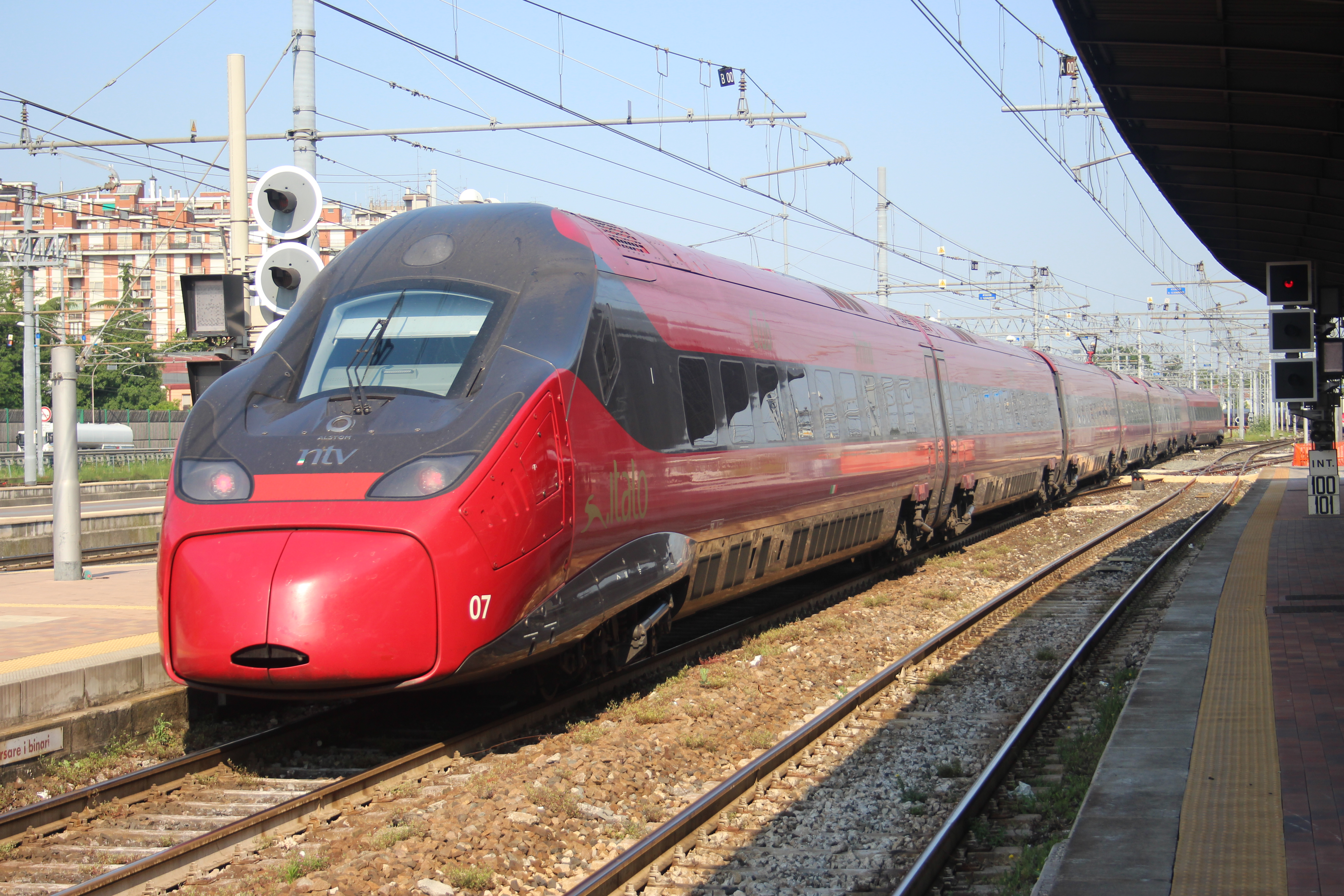
ETR 675 Italo EVO (NTV) at Venezia Mestre railway station.

The Italian high-speed service began in 1938 with an electric-multiple-unit ETR 200, designed for 200 km/h (120 mph), between Bologna and Naples. It too reached 160 km/h (99 mph) in commercial service, and achieved a world mean speed record of 203 km/h (126 mph) between Florence and Milan in 1938.

Major works to increase the commercial speed of the trains already started in 1967: the Rome-Florence "super-direct" line was built for trains up to 230 km/h (143 mph), and reduced the journey time to less than two hours. The Florence–Rome high-speed railway was the first high-speed line opened in Europe when more than half of it opened in 1977.

In 2009 a new high-speed line linking Milan and Turin, operating at 300 km/h (186 mph), opened to passenger traffic, reducing the journey time from two hours to one hour. In the same year, the Milan-Bologna line was open, reducing the journey time to 55 minutes. Also the Bologna-Florence high-speed line was upgraded to 300 km/h (186 mph) for a journey time of 35 minutes.

Since then, it is possible to travel from Turin to Salerno (ca. 950 km (590 mi)) in less than five hours. More than 100 trains per day are operated.

The main public operator of high-speed trains (alta velocità AV, formerly Eurostar Italia) is Trenitalia, part of FSI. Trains are divided into three categories (called "Le Frecce"): Frecciarossa ("Red arrow") trains operate at a maximum of 300 km/h (186 mph) on dedicated high-speed tracks; Frecciargento (Silver arrow) trains operate at a maximum of 250 km/h (155 mph) on both high-speed and mainline tracks; Frecciabianca (White arrow) trains operate at a maximum of 200 km/h (124 mph) on mainline tracks only.

Since 2012, a new and Italy's first private train operator, NTV (branded as Italo), run high-speed services in competition with Trenitalia. Even nowadays, Italy is the only country in Europe with a private high-speed train operator.

Construction of the Milan-Venice high-speed line has begun in 2013 and in 2016 the Milan-Treviglio section has been opened to passenger traffic; the Milan-Genoa high-speed line (Terzo Valico dei Giovi) is also under construction.

Today it is possible to travel from Rome to Milan in less than three hours (2h 55') with the Frecciarossa 1000, the new high-speed train. To cover this route, there's a train every 30 minutes.

=== Night trains ===
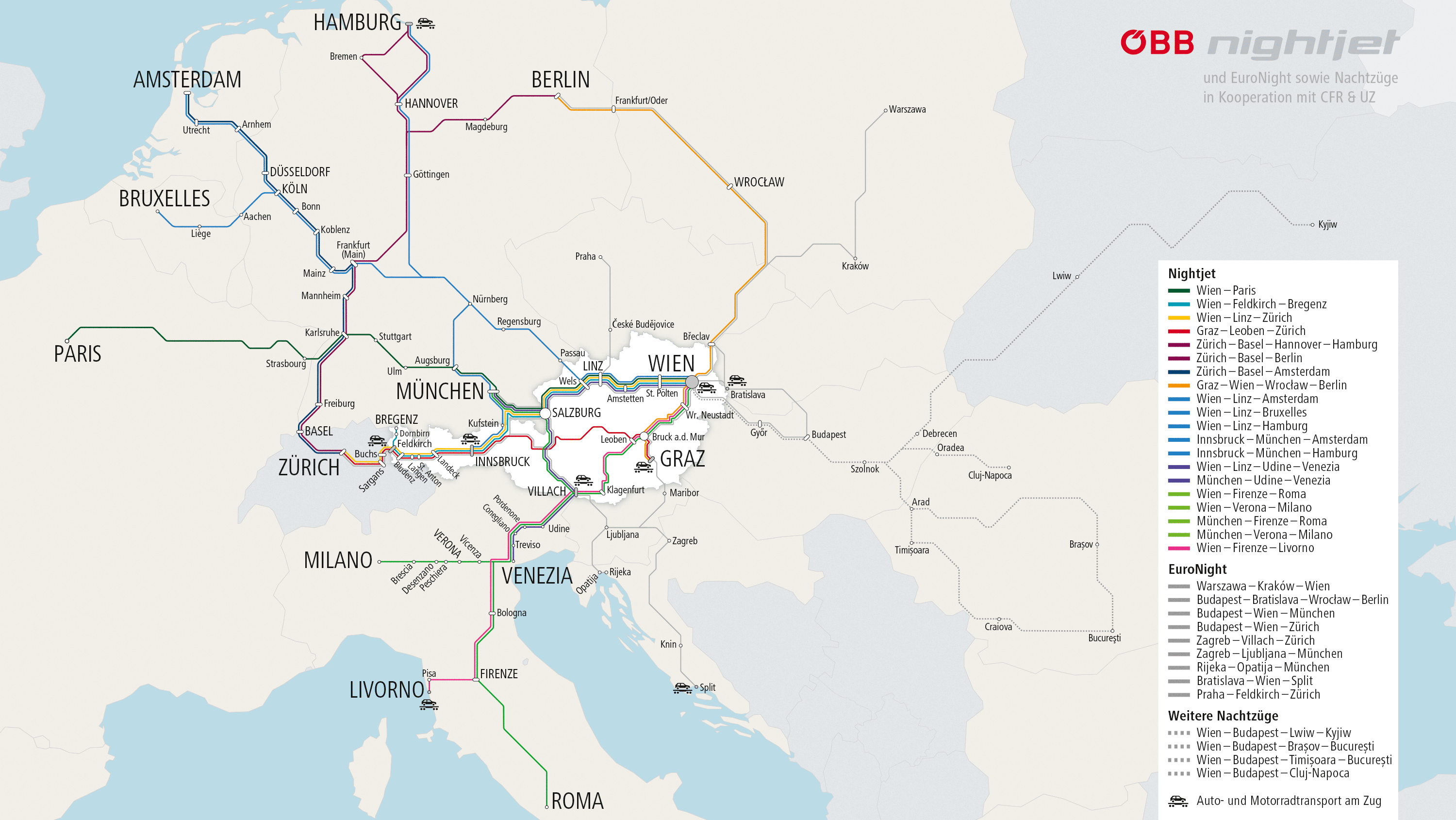
Nightjet Route Map (2023)

The Nightjet of the Austrian Federal Railways (ÖBB) serves different big cities in Italy like Rome, Venice, Florence and Milano. The trains can be used for rides inside Italy as well as for journeys abroad.

Nightjet trains offers beds in sleeper carriages (Nightjet's most comfortable service category), couchette carriages, and seated carriages. On certain connections, cars can also be transported on the train. Bikes can be transported in a bike transport bag, or on some connections also in special bike racks.

=== Intercity trains ===
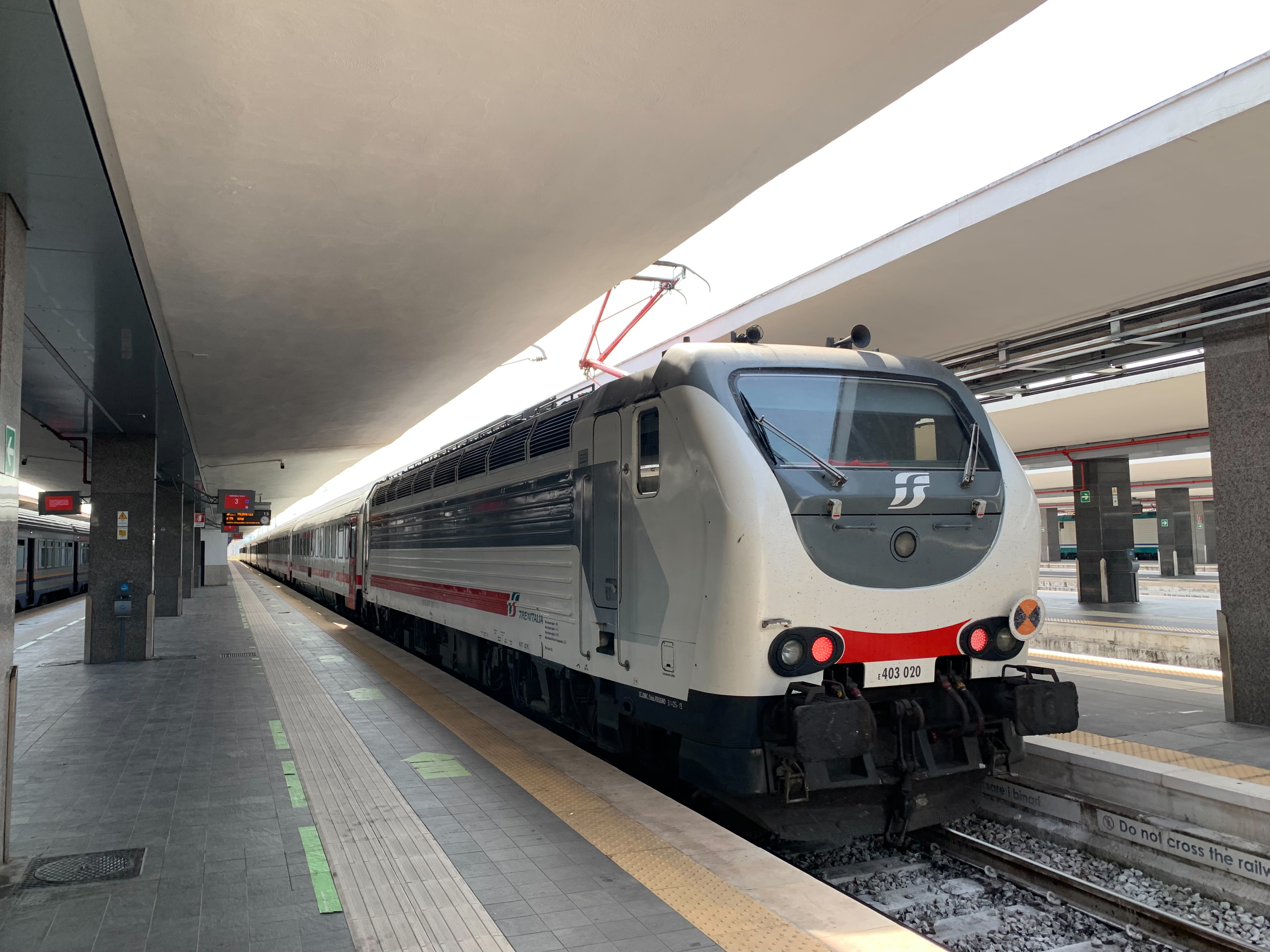
An Italian InterCity train at Napoli Centrale railway station

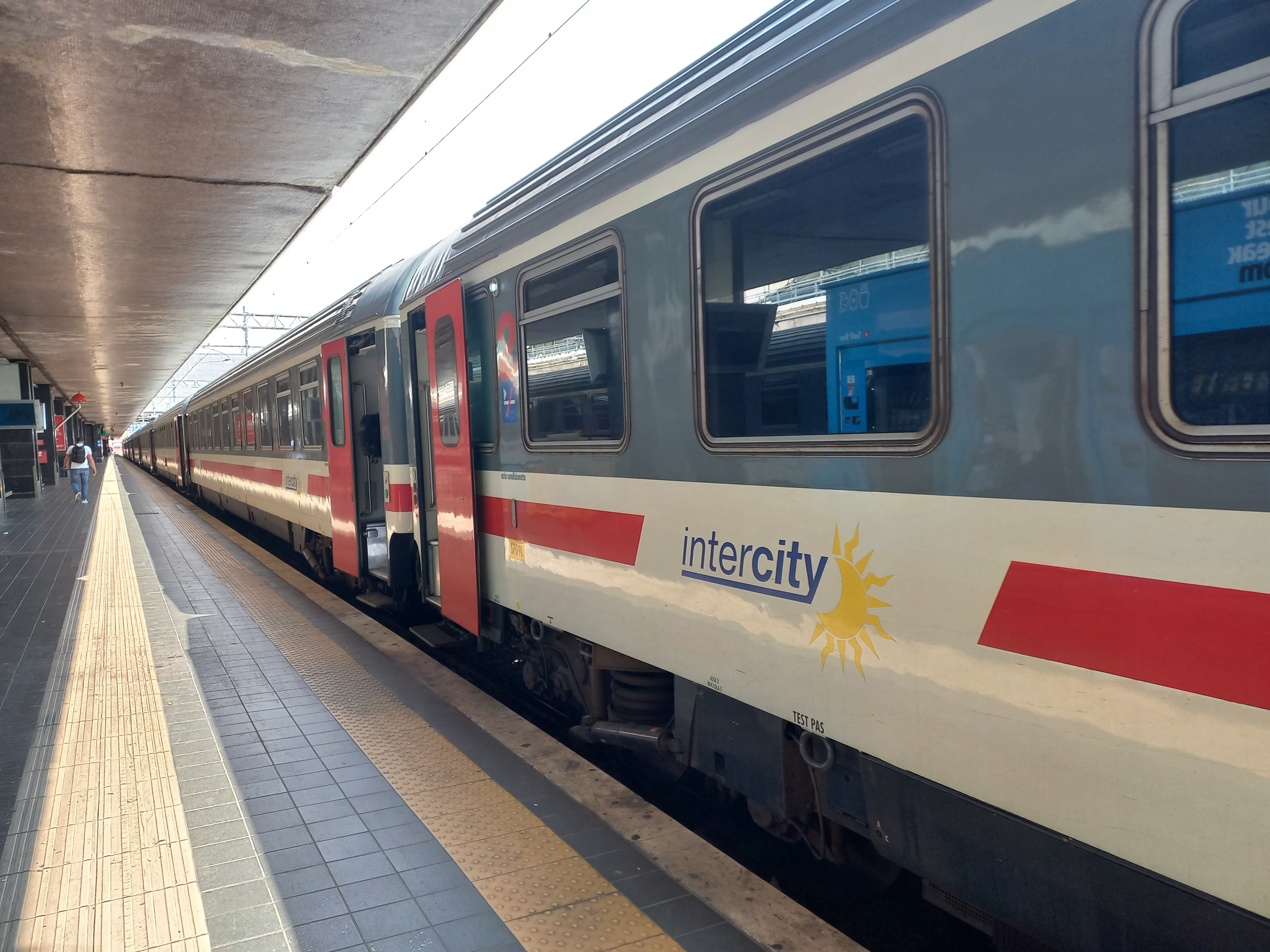
An Italian InterCity train at Roma Termini railway station

With the introduction of high-speed trains, intercity trains are limited to few services per day on mainline and regional tracks.

The daytime services (InterCity IC), while not frequent and limited to one or two trains per route, are essential in providing access to cities and towns off the railway's mainline network. The main routes are Trieste to Rome (stopping at Venice, Bologna, Prato, Florence and Arezzo), Milan to Rome (stopping at Genoa, La Spezia, Pisa and Livorno (stopping at Parma, Modena, Bologna, Prato, Florence and Arezzo), Bologna to Lecce (stopping at Rimini, Ancona, Pescara, Bari and Brindisi) and Rome to Reggio di Calabria (stopping at Latina and Naples). In addition, the Intercity trains provide a more economical means of long-distance rail travel within Italy.

The night trains (Intercity Notte ICN) have sleeper compartments and washrooms, but no showers on board. Main routes are Rome to Bolzano/Bozen (calling at Florence, Bologna, Verona, Rovereto and Trento), Milan to Lecce (calling at Piacenza, Parma, Reggio Emilia, Modena, Bologna, Faenza, Forlì, Cesena, Rimini, Ancona, Pescara, Bari and Brindisi), Turin to Lecce (calling at Alessandria, Voghera, Piacenza, Parma, Bologna, Rimini, Pescara, Termoli, San Severo, Foggia, Barletta, Bisceglie, Molfetta, Bari, Monopoli, Fasano, Ostuni and Brindisi) and Reggio di Calabria to Turin (calling at Naples, Rome, Livorno, La Spezia and Genova). Most portions of these ICN services run during the night; since most services take 10 to 15 hours to complete a one-way journey, their day-time portion provide extra train connections to complement with the Intercity services.

There are a total of 86 intercity trains running within Italy per day.

=== Regional trains ===
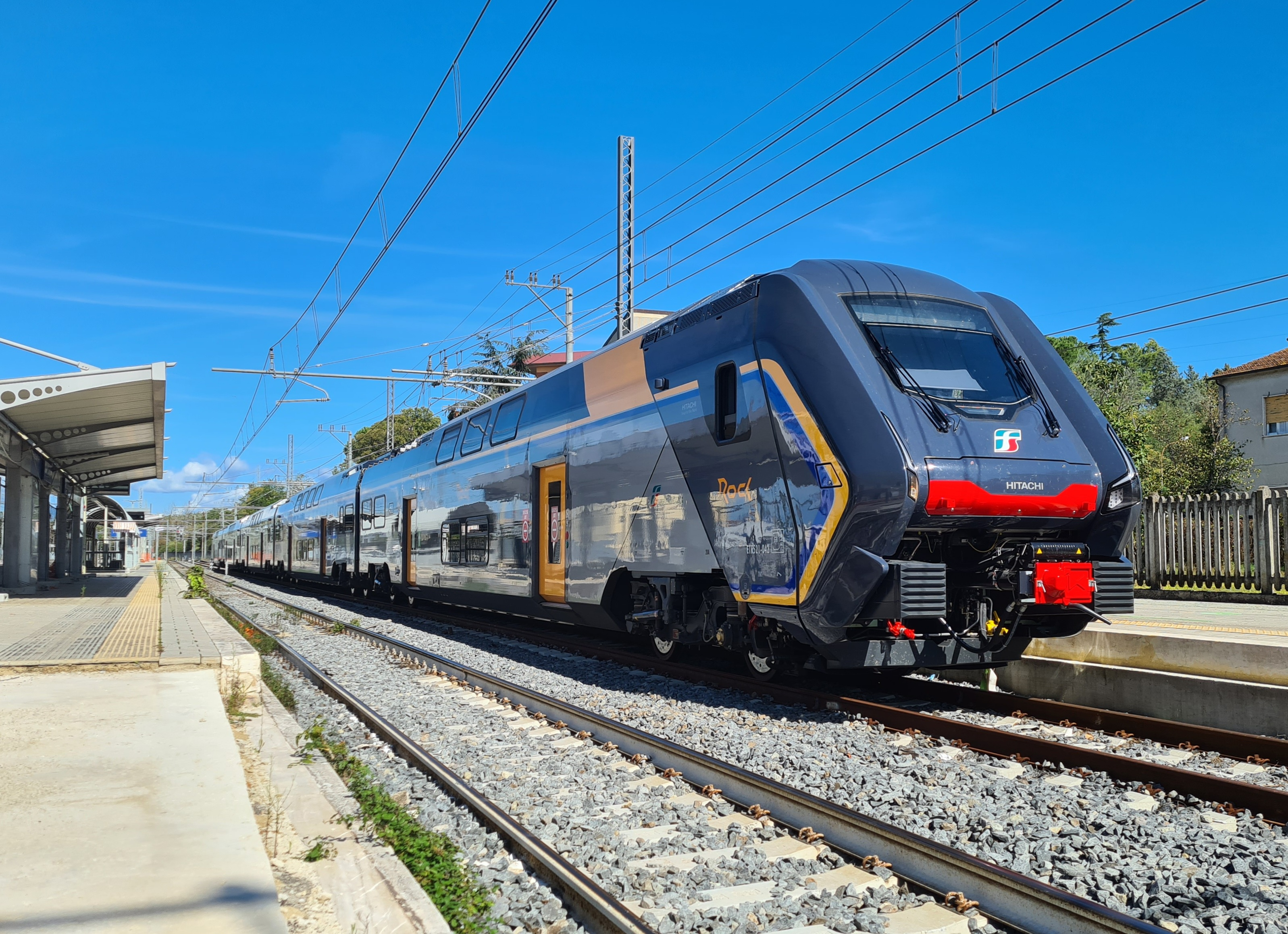
A Trenitalia ETR 521 "Rock" regional train on Florence–Rome railway at Fara Sabina-Montelibretti station

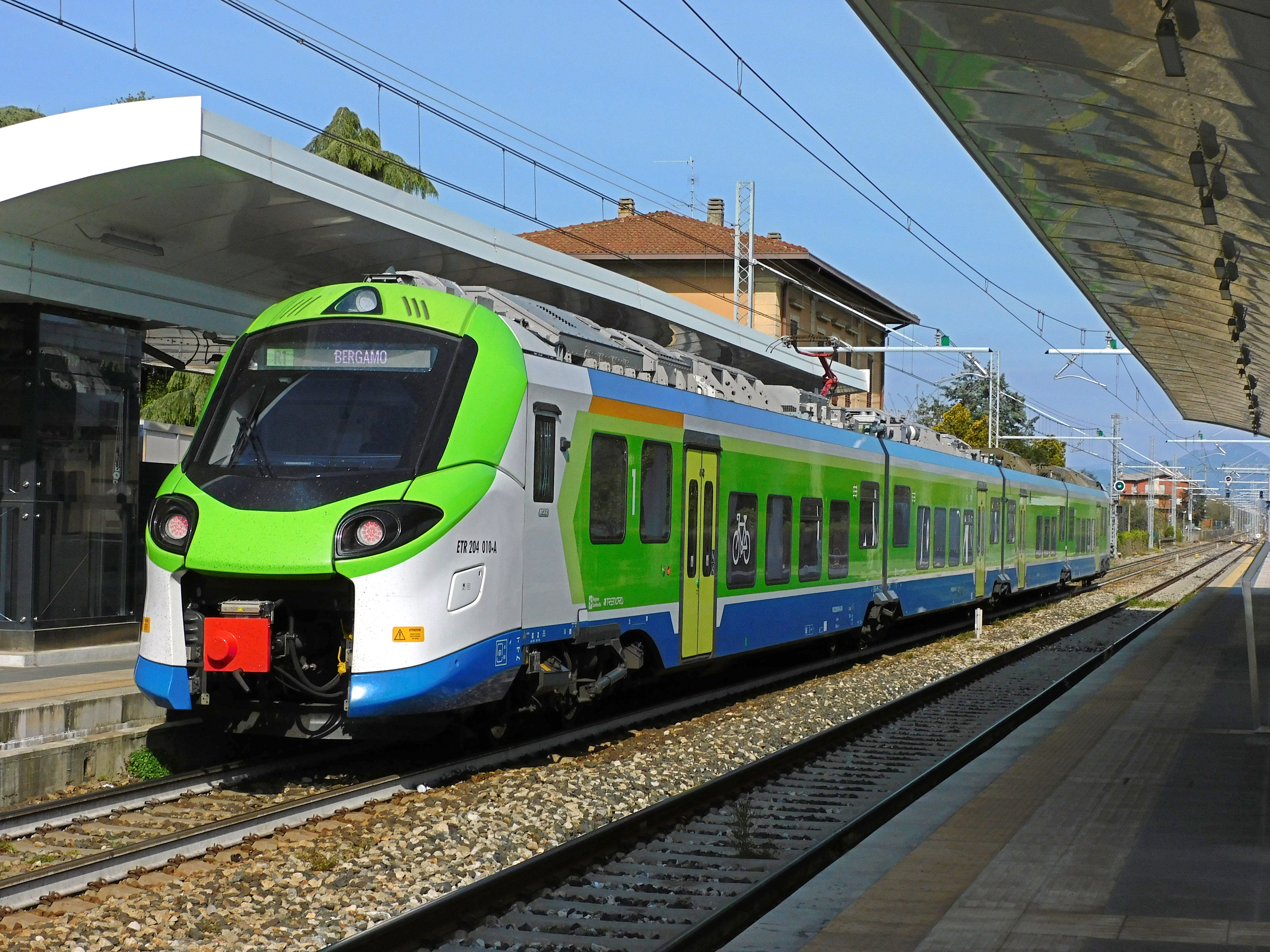
A Trenord Donizetti TN 204 arrives at Palazzolo sull'Oglio railway station

Trenitalia operates regional services (both fast veloce RGV and stopping REG) throughout Italy.

Regional train agencies exist: their train schedules are largely connected to and shown on Trenitalia, and tickets for such train services can be purchased through Trenitalia's national network. Other regional agencies have separate ticket systems which are not mutually exchangeable with that of Trenitalia. These "regional" tickets could be purchased at local newsagents or tobacco stores instead.

- Trentino-Alto Adige / Trentino-Südtirol: Südtirol Bahn (South Tyrol Railway) runs regional services on Ala/Ahl-am-Etsch to Bolzano/Bozen (calling at Rovereto/Rofreit, Trento/Trient and Mezzocorona/Kronmetz), Bolzano/Bozen to Merano/Meran, Bressanone/Brixen to San Candido/Innichen, and a direct "Tirol regional express REX" service between Bolzano/Bozen in Italy and Innsbruck in Austria.
- Veneto: Sistemi Territoriali runs regional trains in Veneto region.
- Lombardy: Trenord runs the Malpensa Express airport train, many Milan's suburban lines and most regional train services in Lombardy. Trenord also co-operates with DB and ÖBB on the EuroCity Verona-Munich service, and with SBB CFF FFS (joint-venture TiLo) on the regional Milan-Bellinzona service.
- Emilia-Romagna: Trasporto Passeggeri Emilia-Romagna provides vital connections across cities on different mainline networks, including Modena, Parma, Suzzara, Ferrara, Reggio Emilia and Bologna.
- Tuscany: La Ferroviaria Italiana operates in Arezzo province.
- Abruzzo: Sangritana runs daily services between Pescara and Lanciano.

In addition to these agencies, there's a great deal of other little operators, such as AMT Genova for the Genova-Casella railway.

=== Rail links with adjacent countries ===
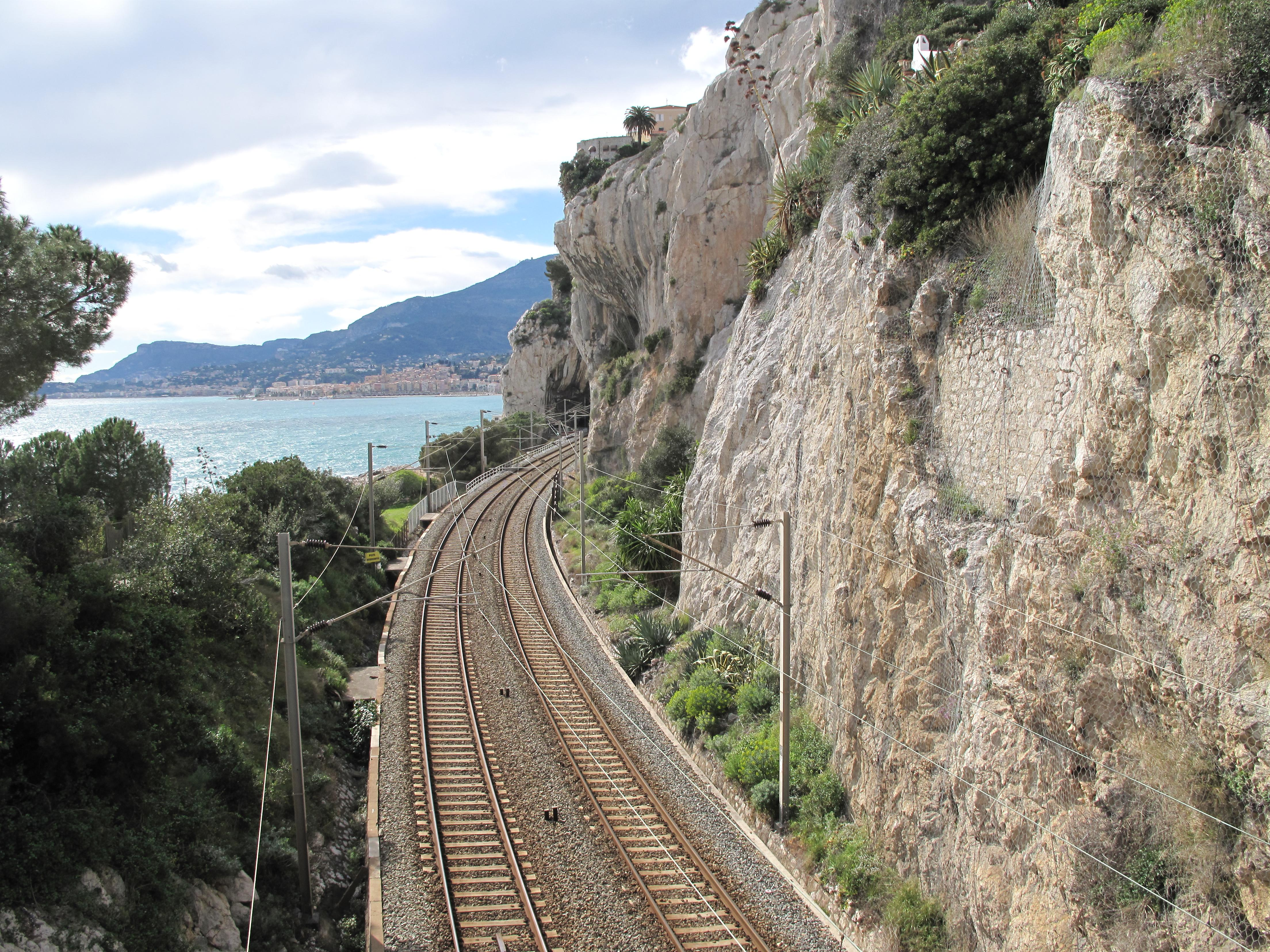
Marseille-Ventimiglia railway, connecting Italy and France

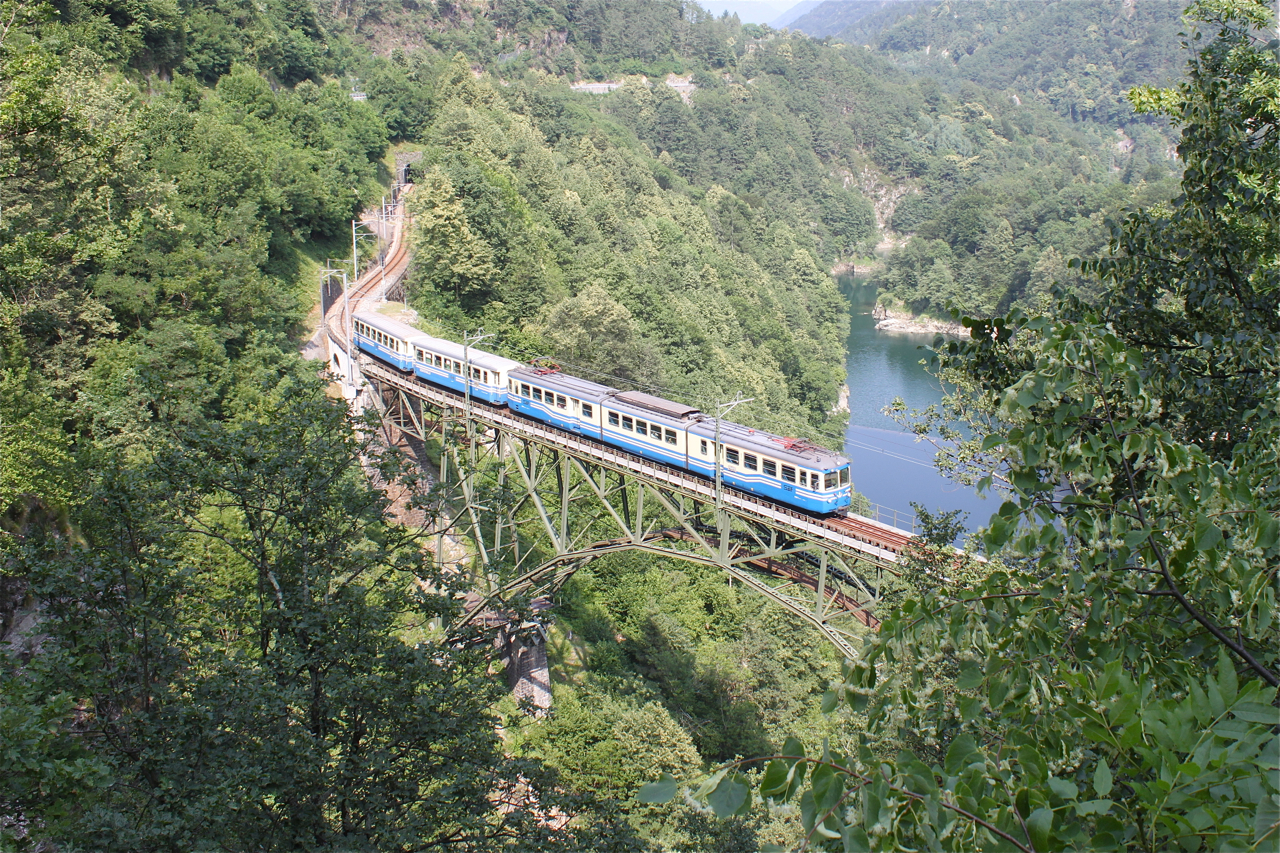
Domodossola–Locarno railway line, connecting Italy and Switzerland

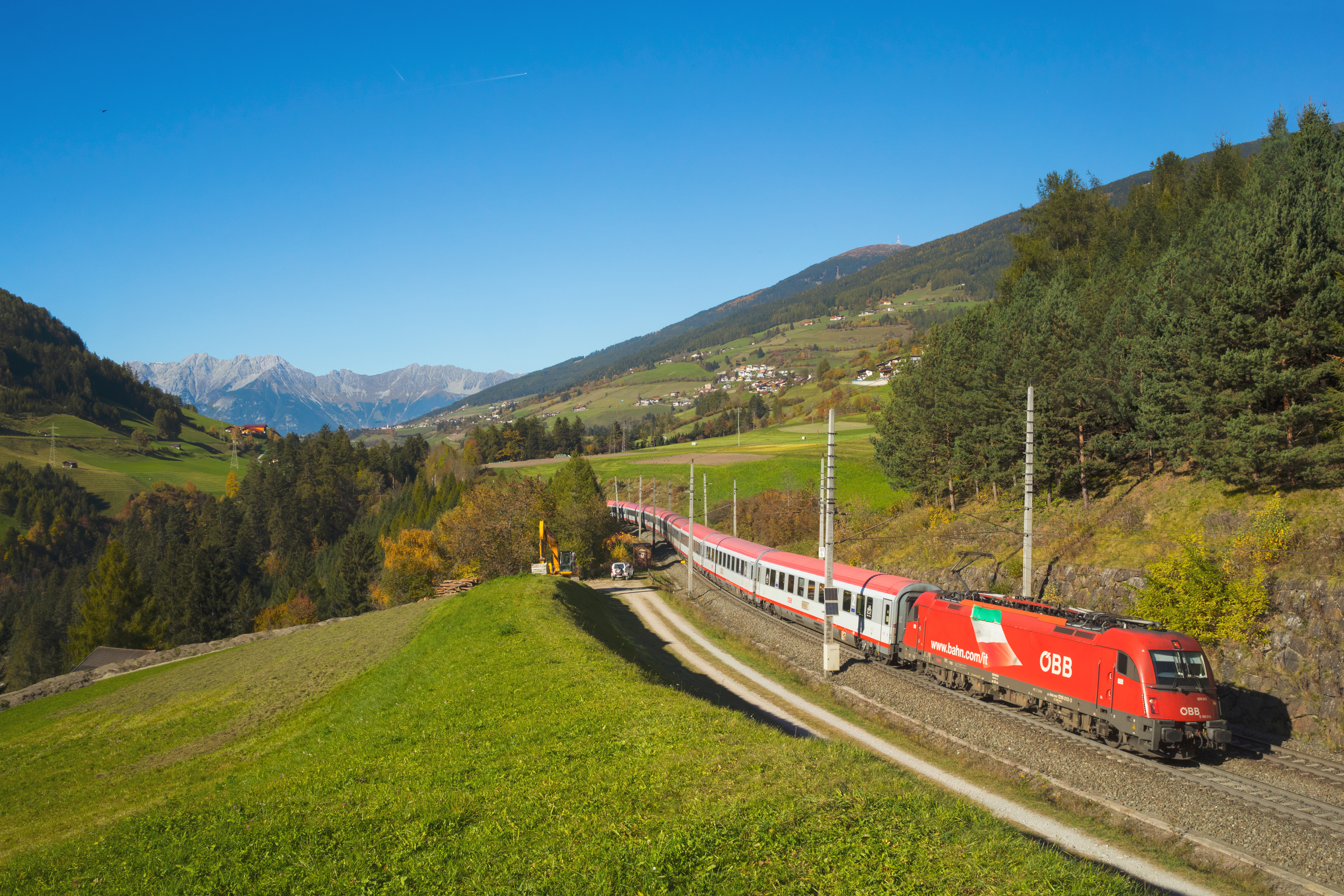
Brenner railway, connecting Italy and Austria

Italy has 11 rail border crossings over the Alpine mountains with her neighbouring countries: six are designated as mainline tracks and two are metre-gauge tracks. The six mainline border crossings are: two with France (one for Nice and Marseille; the other for Lyon and Dijon), two with Switzerland (one for Brig, Bern and Geneva; the other for Chiasso, Lugano, Lucerne and Zürich), and two with Austria (one for Innsbruck; the other for Villach, Graz and Vienna). The two-metre-gauge track crossings are located at the border town of Tirano (enters Switzerland's Canton Graubünden/Grisons) and Domodossola (enters Switzerland's Locarno).

There is a railway line connecting Italy's northeastern port of Trieste to Slovenia, but no passenger or freight services operate on this track. Consequently, there is no direct connections between Trieste and Ljubljana, the capital of Slovenia, despite the proximity of both cities.

- Italy-France: Marseille-Ventimiglia railway, currently EuroCity trains of Thello Milan-Marseille and one EuroNight train of RZD Moscow-Nice.
- Italy-France: Fréjus Rail Tunnel at 1,338 m (4,390 ft) above sea, currently SNCF TGV trains Milan-Paris and Turin-Paris and EuroNight trains of Thello Venice-Paris
- Italy-Switzerland: Domodossola–Locarno railway metre-gauge trains
- Italy-Switzerland: Simplon Tunnel, currently EuroCity trains of SBB CFF FFS Milan-Geneva and Milan-Bern
- Italy-Switzerland: connecting Varese (Italy) to Bellinzona (Switzerland) and runs on the eastern coast of Lake Maggiore
- Italy-Switzerland: Milan–Chiasso railway, currently EuroCity trains of SBB CFF FFS Milan-Zürich
- Italy-Switzerland: Bernina railway at 2,253 m (7,392 ft) above sea, metre-gauge trains of RhB Tirano-St. Moritz and the Bernina Express tourist train
- Italy-Austria: Brenner railway at 1,371 m (4,498 ft) above sea, currently EuroCity trains of ÖBB-DB Munich-Verona and Munich-Venice/Bologna, and DB CityNightLine Munich-Rome/Milan
- Italy-Austria: at 1,175 m (3,855 ft) above sea connecting San Candido/Innichen (Italy) and Lienz (Austria)
- Italy-Austria: connecting Venice and Udine (Italy) to Villach (Austria), currently EuroCity trains of ÖBB Venice-Vienna, EuroNight trains of ÖBB Vienna-Rome/Milan, and DB CityNightLine Munich-Venice
- Italy-Slovenia: Tarvisio–Ljubljana Railway

The Vatican City is also linked to Italy with a railway line serving a single railway station, the Vatican City railway station. This line is used only for special occasions. San Marino used to have a narrow gauge rail connection with Italy; this was dismantled in 1944.

=== Stations ===
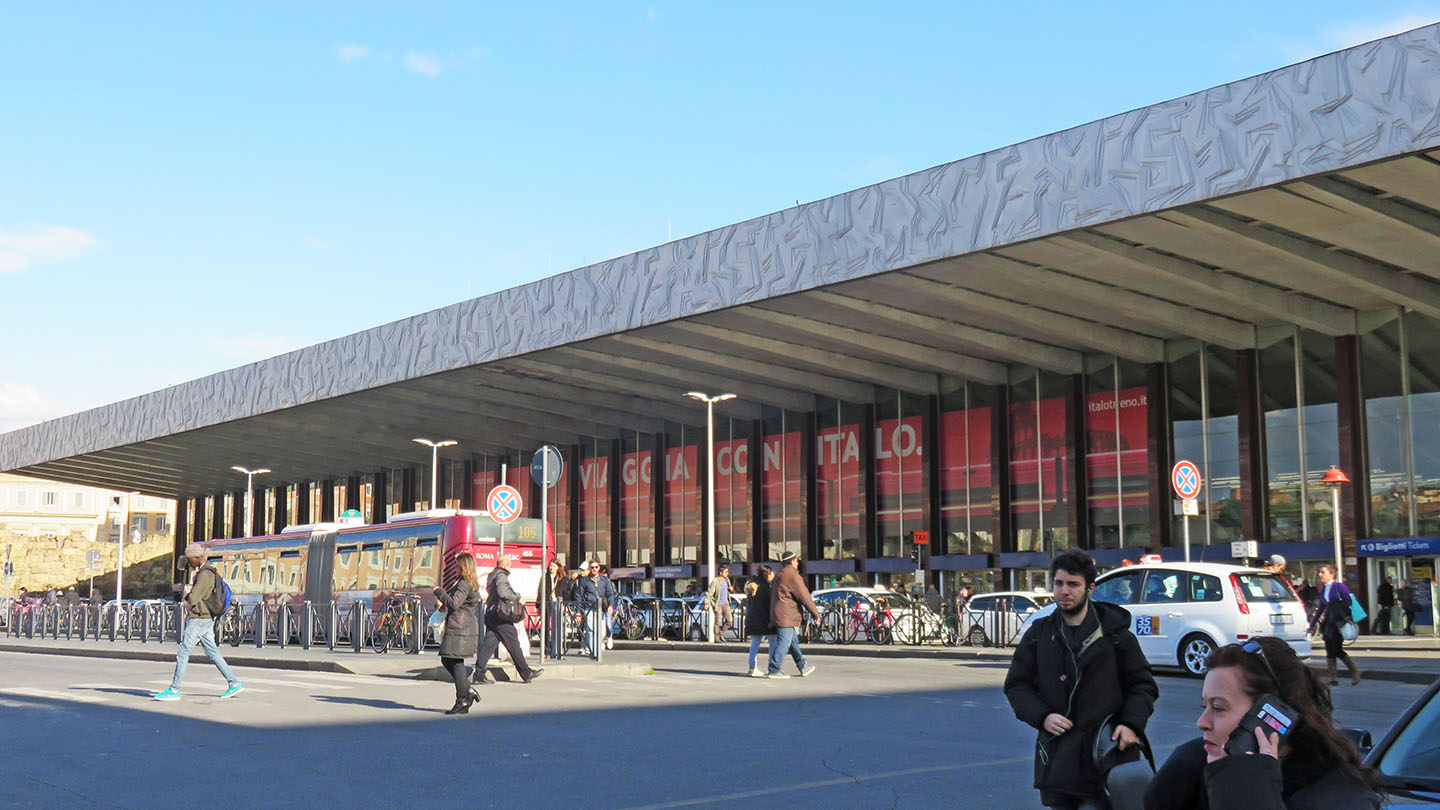
Roma Termini railway station

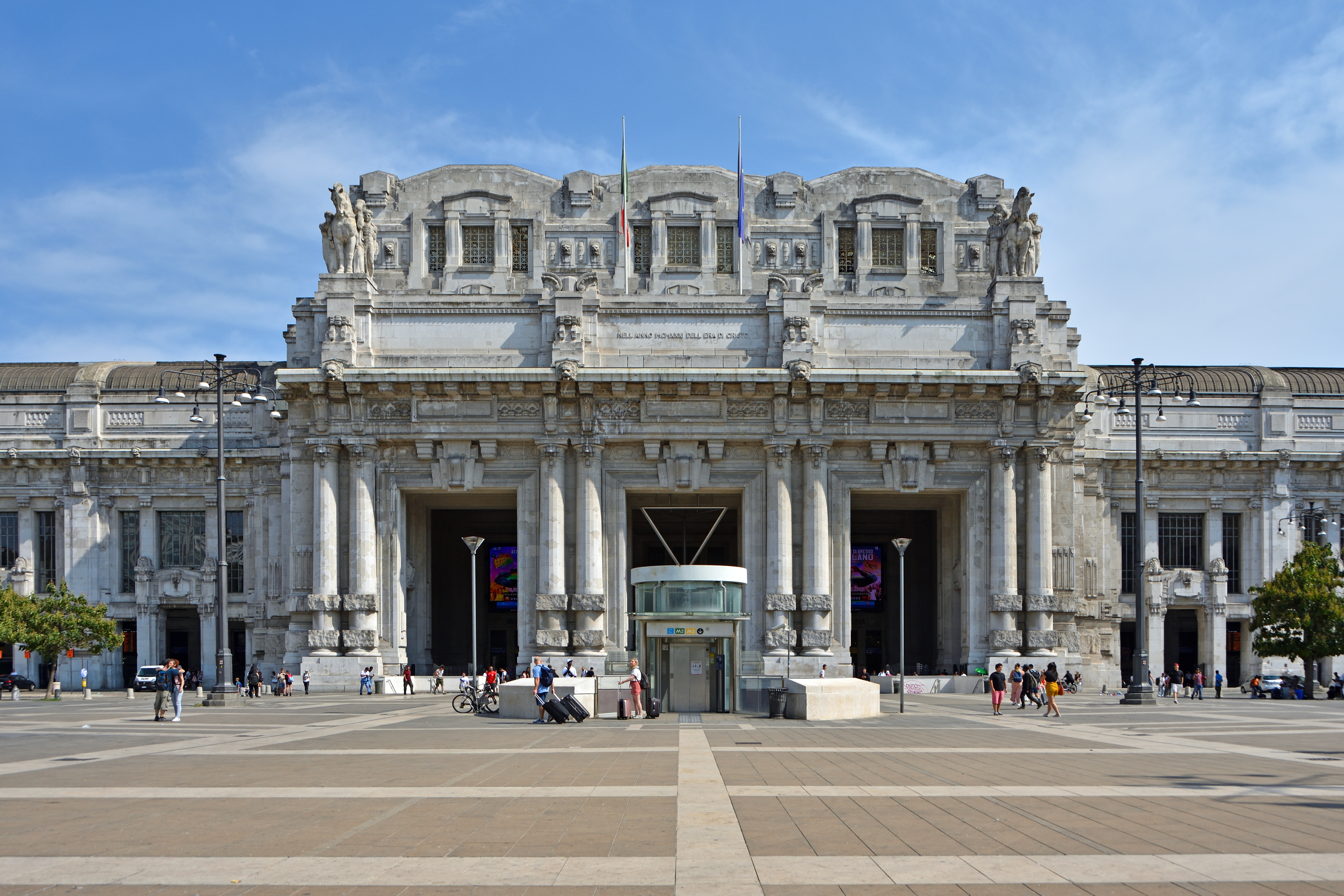
Milano Centrale railway station

Italy's top ten railway stations by annual passengers are:

Rank	Railway Station	Annual entries/exits (millions)	Number of platforms	City	Region
1	Roma Termini	150	32	Rome	Lazio
2	Milano Centrale	145	24	Milan	Lombardy
3	Torino Porta Nuova	70	20	Turin	Piedmont
4	Firenze Santa Maria Novella	59	19	Florence	Tuscany
5	Bologna Centrale	58	28	Bologna	Emilia-Romagna
6	Roma Tiburtina	51	20	Rome	Lazio
7	Napoli Centrale	50	25	Naples	Campania
8	Milano Cadorna	33.1	10	Milan	Lombardy
9	Venezia Mestre	31	13	Venice	Veneto
10	Venezia Santa Lucia	30	16	Venice	Veneto

== Rapid transit ==
=== Metro ===
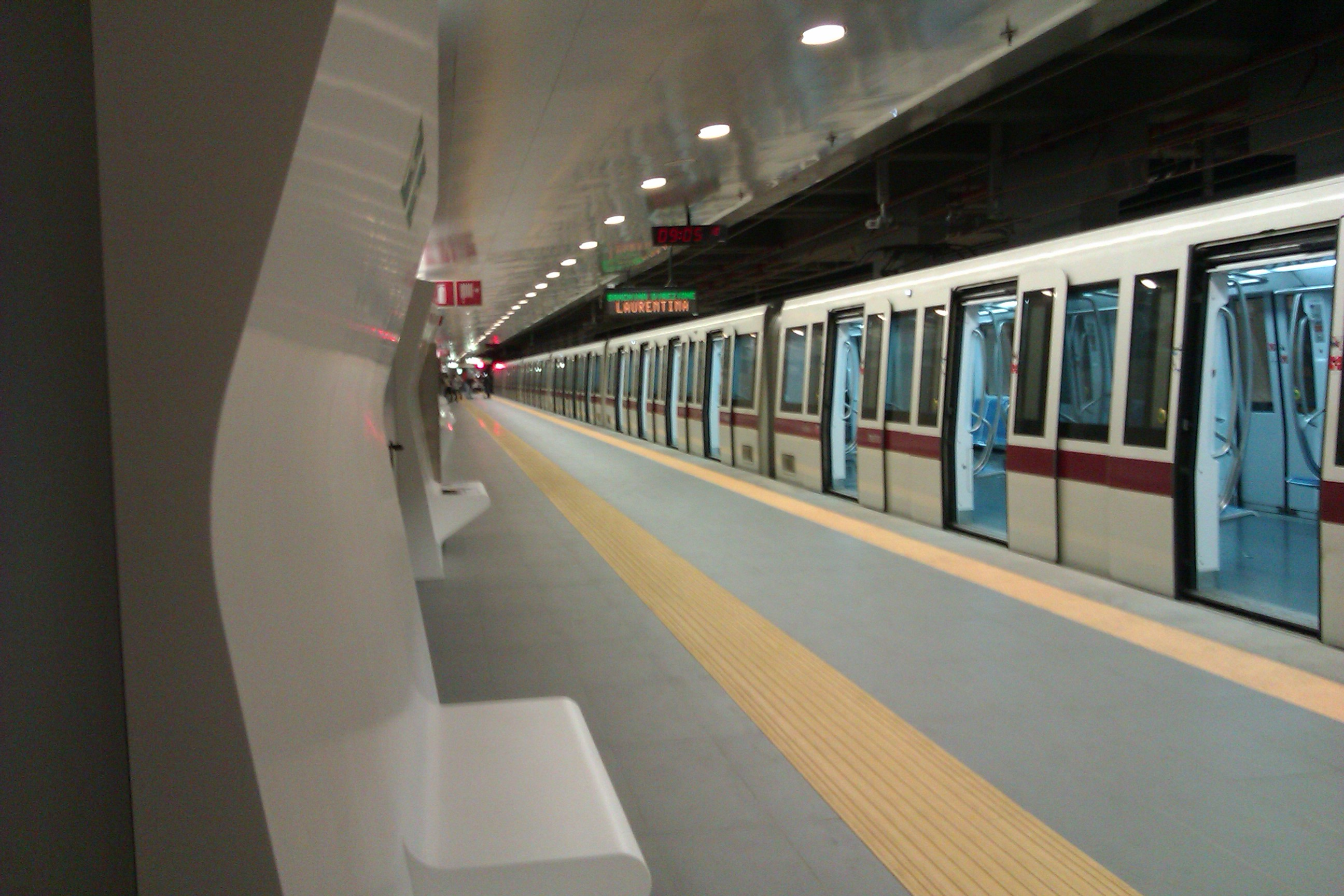
Rome Metro

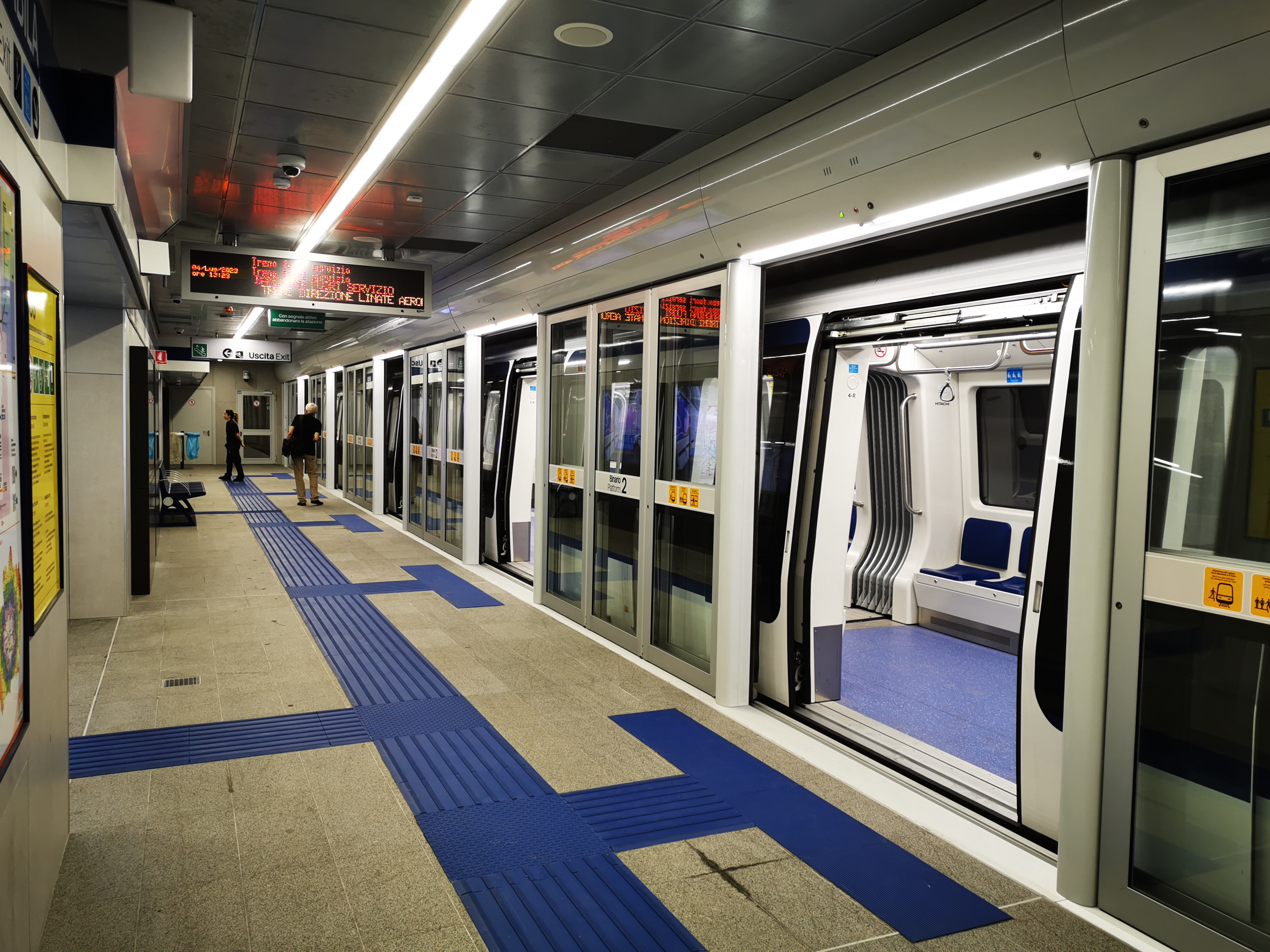
Milan Metro

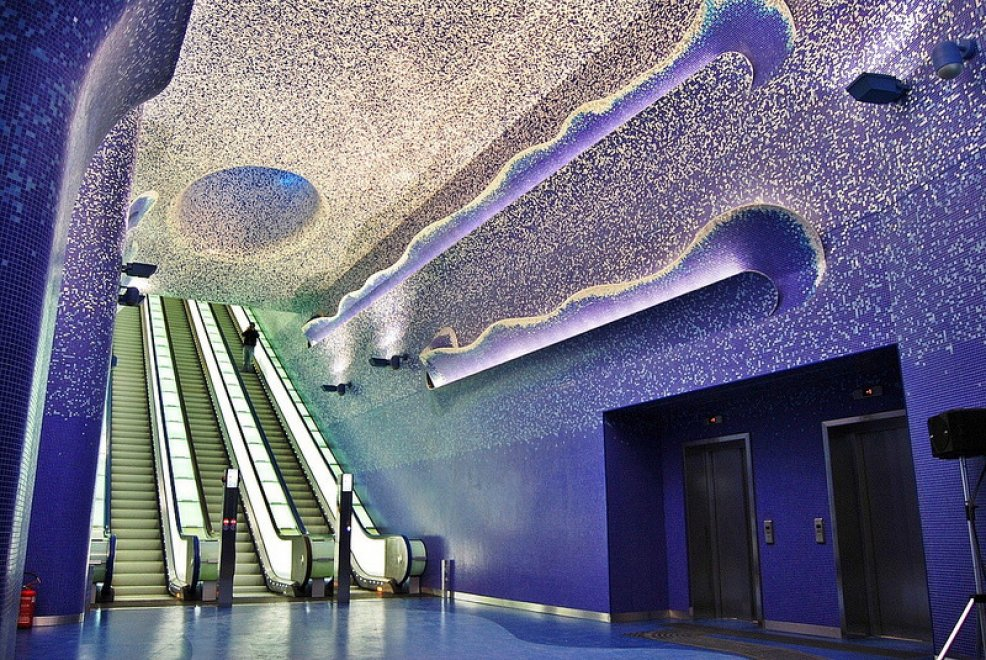
Toledo station on Line 1 of the Naples Metro

The Rome Metro is a rapid transit system that operates in Rome, Italy. It started operation in 1955, making it the oldest in the country. The Metro comprises three lines – A (orange), B (blue) and C (green) – which operate on 60 km (37 mi) of route, serving 73 stations. It has a daily ridership of approximately 820,000 passengers, and an annual traffic of approximately 320 million passengers.

Milan Metro is the largest rapid transit system in Italy in terms of length, number of stations and ridership; and the fifth longest in the European Union and the eighth in the Europe. The network consists of five lines (two of which driverless) with a total network length of 111.8 kilometres (69.5 mi), and a total of 125 stations, mostly underground. The first line, Line 1, opened in 1964; Line 2 opened 5 years later in 1969, Line 3 in 1990, Line 5 (driverless) in 2013, and Line 4 (driverless) in 2022.

The Naples Metro is a rapid transit system serving the city of Naples, Campania, Italy and some parts of the adjacent comuni of its metropolitan area through Line 11. The system comprises three underground rapid transit lines (Line 1, Line 6 and Line 11). It is the third largest underground network in Italy, behind Milan and Rome. The Art Stations of the Naples Metro consist of 12 stations along Line 1 and Line 6 of the Naples Metro with art installations. In total, there are more than 250 works of art. On 30 November 2012, the Toledo station was elected by The Daily Telegraph as the most beautiful subway station in Europe and the world, a recognition echoed by CNN’s rankings; while the Materdei station resulted at 13th place.

Seven Italian cities have metro systems:

City	Name	Lines	Length	Stations	Opening
Brescia	Brescia Metro	1	13.7 km (8.5 mi)	17	2013
Catania	Catania Metro	1	10.5 km (6.5 mi)	12	1999
Genoa	Genoa Metro	1	7.1 km (4.4 mi)	8	1990
Milan	Milan Metro	5	111.8 km (69.5 mi)	125	1964
Naples	Naples Metro	3	36.4 km (22.6 mi)	31	1993
Rome	Rome Metro	3	62 km (39 mi)	74	1955
Turin	Turin Metro	1	15.1 km (9.4 mi)	23	2006

=== Commuter rail ===
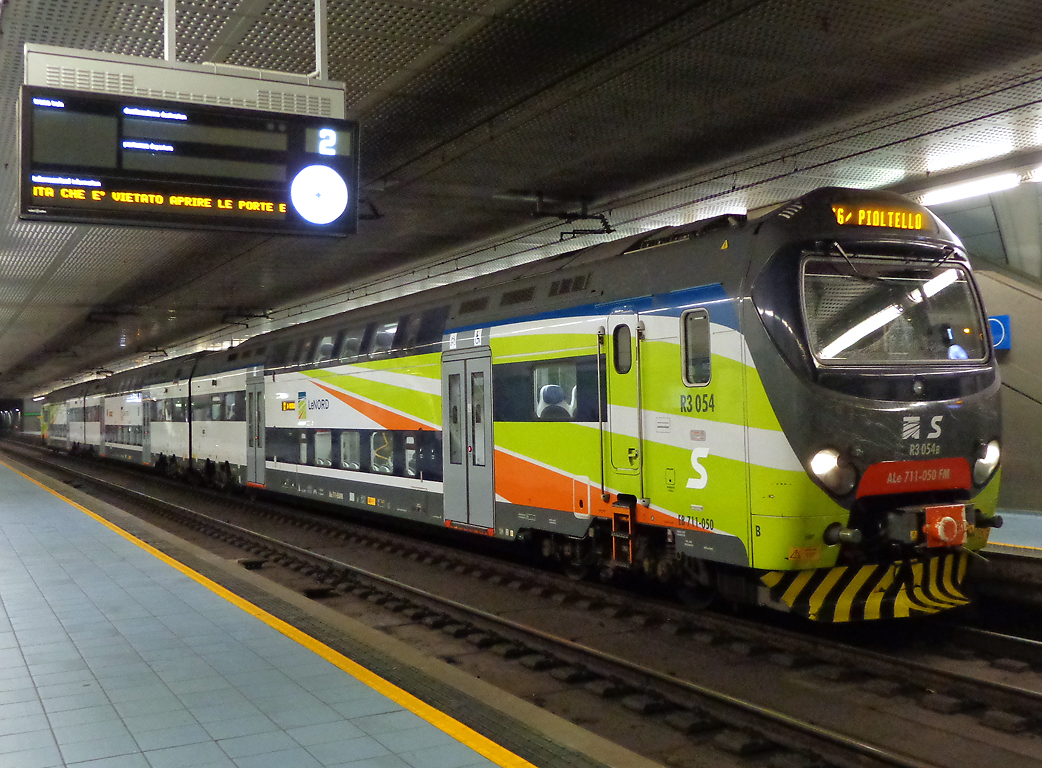
A TSR train at Milano Porta Venezia railway station on the Milan Passerby railway

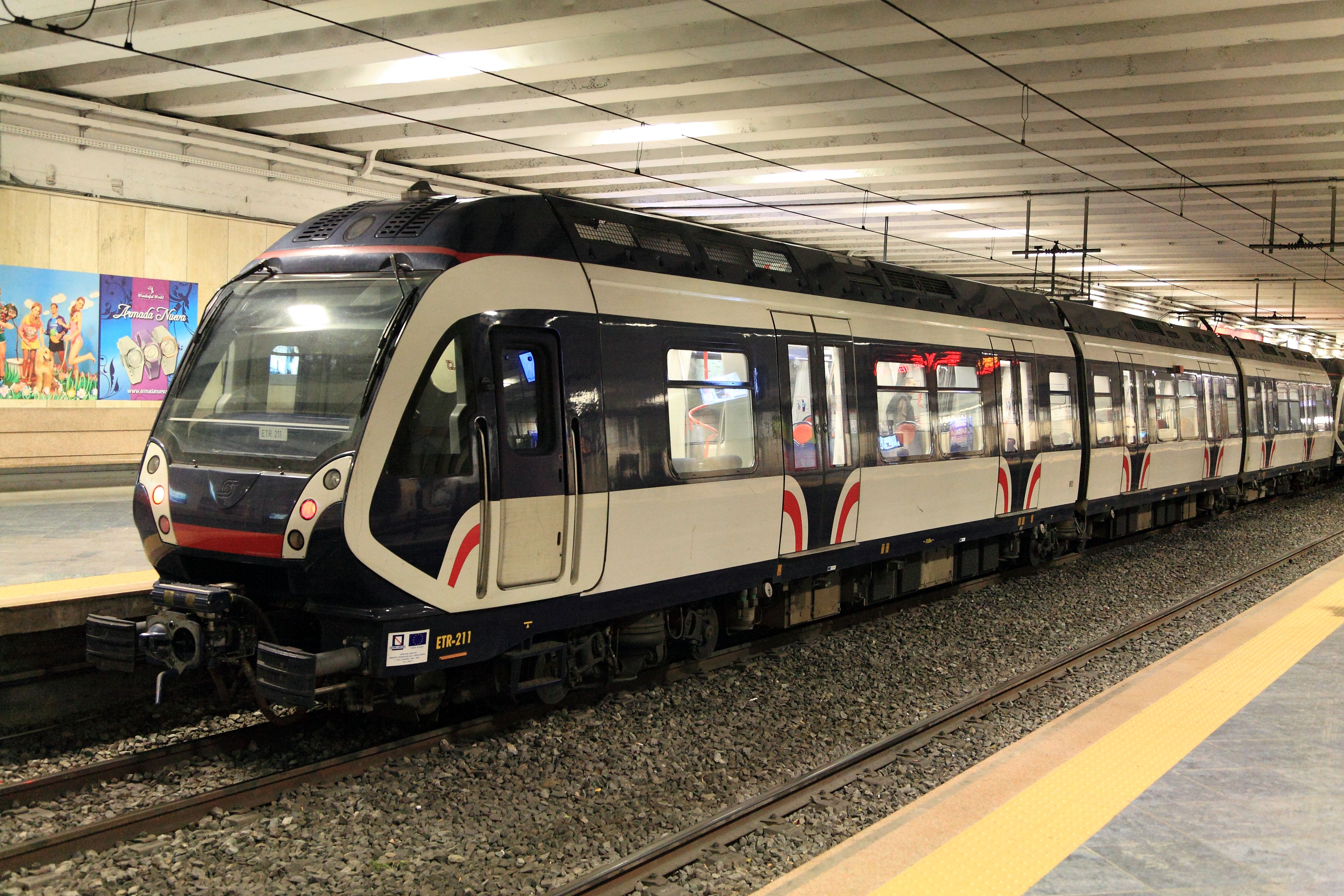
A Metrostar train at Napoli Garibaldi railway station on the Circumvesuviana railway network

15 cities have commuter rail systems; cities without wikilink are those listed just above for their metro rail system.

- Bari (Bari metropolitan railway service, 3 lines)
- Bologna (Bologna metropolitan railway service, 8 lines)
- Cagliari, 1 line
- Catanzaro, 2 lines
- Genoa (Genoa urban railway service, 3 lines)
- Messina, 1 line
- Milan (Milan suburban railway service, 12 lines)
- Naples (Naples metropolitan railway service, 8 lines)
- Palermo (Palermo metropolitan railway service, 2 lines)
- Perugia, 1 line
- Potenza, 1 line
- Reggio Calabria, 1 line
- Rome (FL lines, 8 lines)
- Salerno (Salerno metropolitan railway service, 1 line)
- Turin (Turin metropolitan railway service, 8 lines)
- Treni Regionali Ticino Lombardia connects Canton Ticino, Switzerland, and Italy, reaching Lombard cities like Como and Varese and the Milan Malpensa Airport.

=== Airport shuttles ===
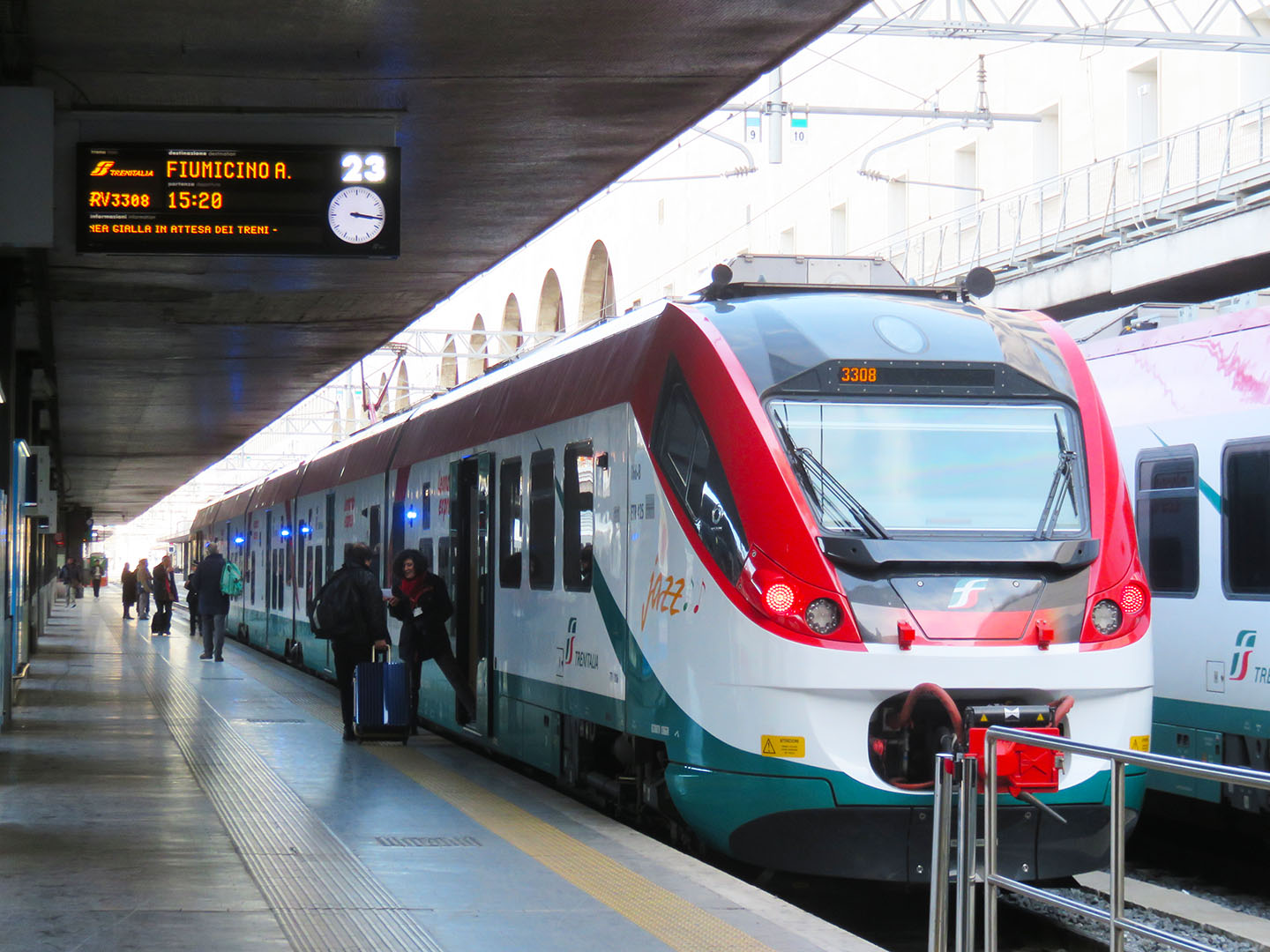
Leonardo Express at Roma Termini railway station

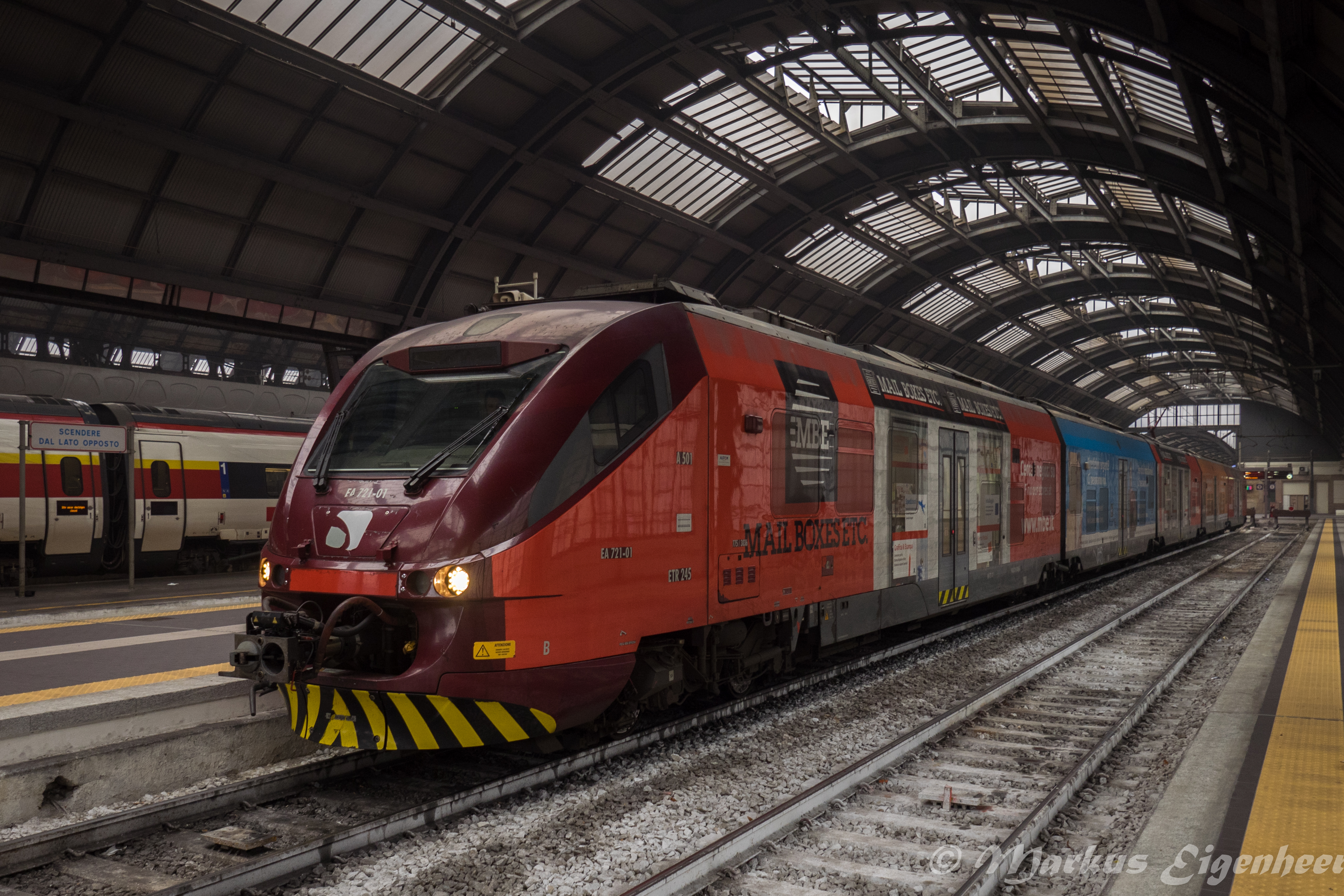
Malpensa Express at Milano Centrale railway station

Airport shuttle buses are highly developed and convenient for rail travellers. Most airports in Italy are not connected to the railway network, except for Rome Fiumicino Airport, Milan Malpensa Airport and Turin Caselle Airport. In Bologna, there is the monorail Marconi Express, connecting Bologna Airport to the main railway station. Linate Airport in Milan has been connected to line 4 of the Milan Metro since 2022.

- Venice: Venezia-Mestre station - Marco Polo Airport (50 minutes) and Treviso Airport
- Milan: Milano Centrale station - Malpensa Airport (1 hour 5 minutes), Linate Airport (35 minutes) and Milan Bergamo Airport (1 hour)
- Brescia: Brescia station - Milan Bergamo Airport (1 hour)
- Rome: Rome Termini station - Fiumicino Airport (31 minutes)
- Verona: Verona Porta Nuova station - Villafranca "Catullo" Airport (20 minutes)
- Bologna: Centrale station - Bologna Airport (20 minutes) - Route modified in November 2020. It shifted from route BLQ (Bologna Centrale Station-Bologna Airport) to route 944 Ospedale Maggiore-Bologna Airport
- Pescara Centrale station - Abruzzo Airport (10 minutes)
- Pisa: Pisa Centrale station - San Giusto Airport (5 minutes)
- Florence: Firenze S M Novella station - Florence Airport

=== Tram-train ===
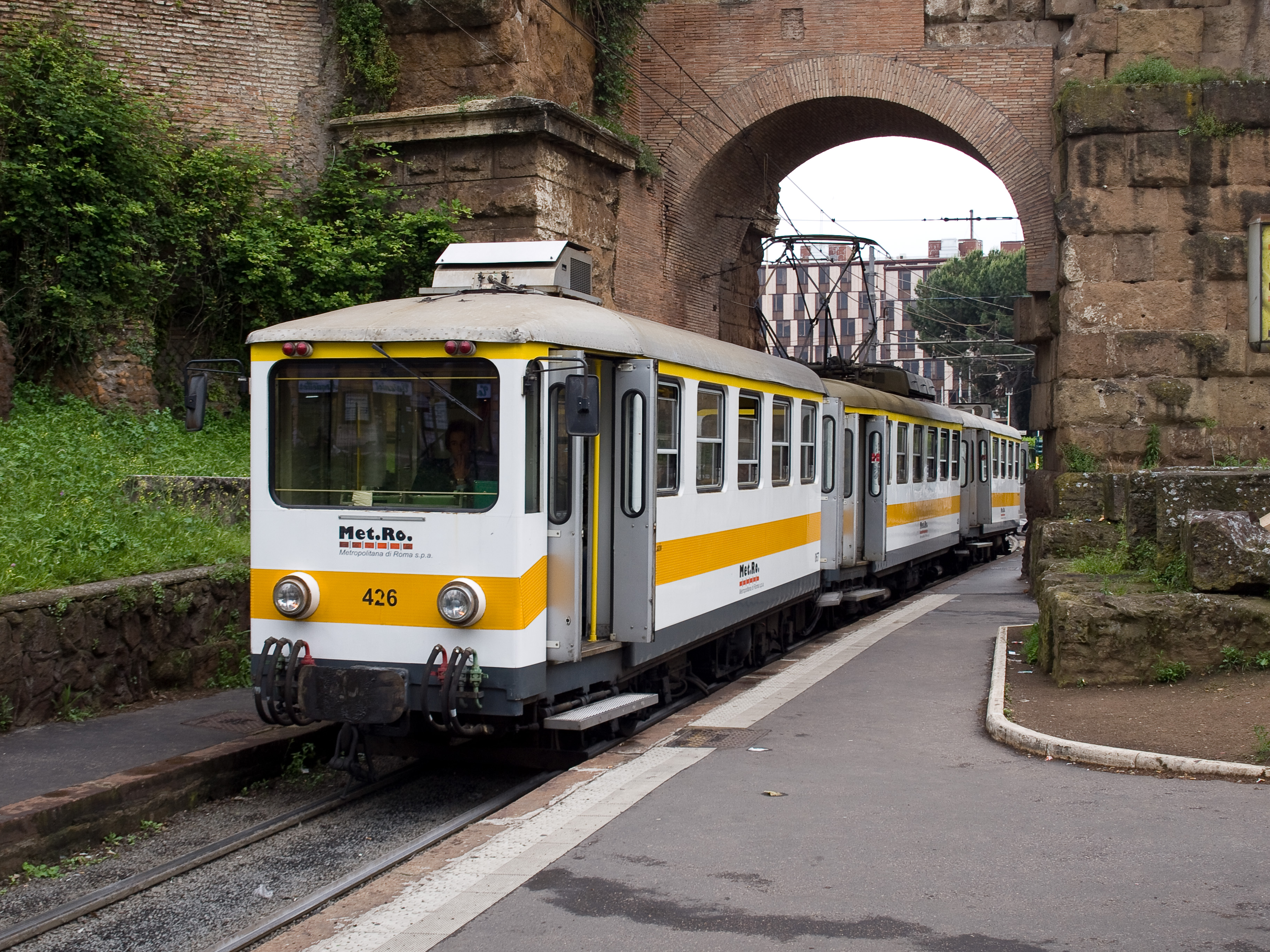
Rome–Giardinetti railway

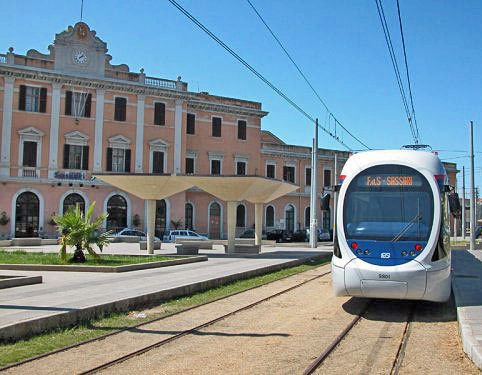
Metrosassari

2 cities have tram-train system, Rome and Sassari. The Rome–Giardinetti railway connects Laziali (a regional train station some 800 metres (2,625 ft) from Termini's main concourse) with Giardinetti to the east just past the Grande Raccordo Anulare, Rome's orbital motorway. It is run by ATAC, the company responsible for public transportation in the city, which also operates the Rome Metro. The present railway is the only part of the old and longer Rome–Fiuggi–Alatri–Frosinone railway to be in service. The latest shortening of the line occurred in 2008 with the closing of the Giardinetti–Pantano section, which has now become part of the Metro Line C. The line had been due to be dismantled in 2016 to be replaced with a bus lane along Via Casilina, but in March 2015 it was announced that the line would instead be retained and modernised.

Metrosassari, also called Sassari tramway, Sassari tram-train or Sassari metro-tramway (Italian: Metrotranvia di Sassari or Metropolitana leggera di Sassari) is the commercial name of a tram-train line in Sassari, Sardinia, Italy, operated by the regional public transport company ARST (Azienda Regionale Sarda Trasporti). Despite having been built in the early 2000s, in the urban section the line was built with single track and narrow gauge, to connect with the same 950 mm (3 ft 1 3/8 in) gauge used in the secondary railway lines in Sardinia. The 2.45 km (1.52 mi) tramway part of the line (Stazione - Emiciclo Garibaldi) opened in October 2006, linking the railway station with the city centre via the hospital district. On 27 September 2009 the line was extended into the peripheral district of Santa Maria di Pisa, running on the electrified portion of the Sassari–Sorso railway. The main part of the network is in 2013 in advanced development phase. It is under construction is the extension of the line from Santa Maria di Pisa to Li Punti and Baldinca, and the electrification of the railway to Sorso, 10 km from Sassari. It is also planned to convert and electrify the 28 km Sassari-Alghero railway to allow the trams to reach the village of Olmedo, Fertilia Airport and the town of Alghero.

== Roads ==
Network of motorways (in green) and expressways (in blue) longer than 30 km (19 mi) in Italy

Roads in Italy are an important mode of transport in Italy. The classification of the roads of Italy is regulated by the Italian traffic code, both from a technical and administrative point of view. The street nomenclature largely reflects the administrative classification. Italy's paved road network is well developed.

Italy is one of the countries with the most vehicles per capita, with 690 per 1000 people in 2010. Italy has a total of 487,700 km (303,000 mi) of paved roads, of which 7,016 km (4,360 mi) are motorways with a general speed limit of 130 km/h (81 mph), which since 2009 was provisioned for extension up to 150 km/h (93 mph). The speed limit in towns is usually 50 km/h (31 mph) and less commonly 30 km/h (19 mph).

The planned Strait of Messina Bridge was approved in August 2025 and will connect Calabria with Sicily when it opens in 2032 and will become the longest suspension bridge in the world.

=== Technical classification ===
==== Motorways ====
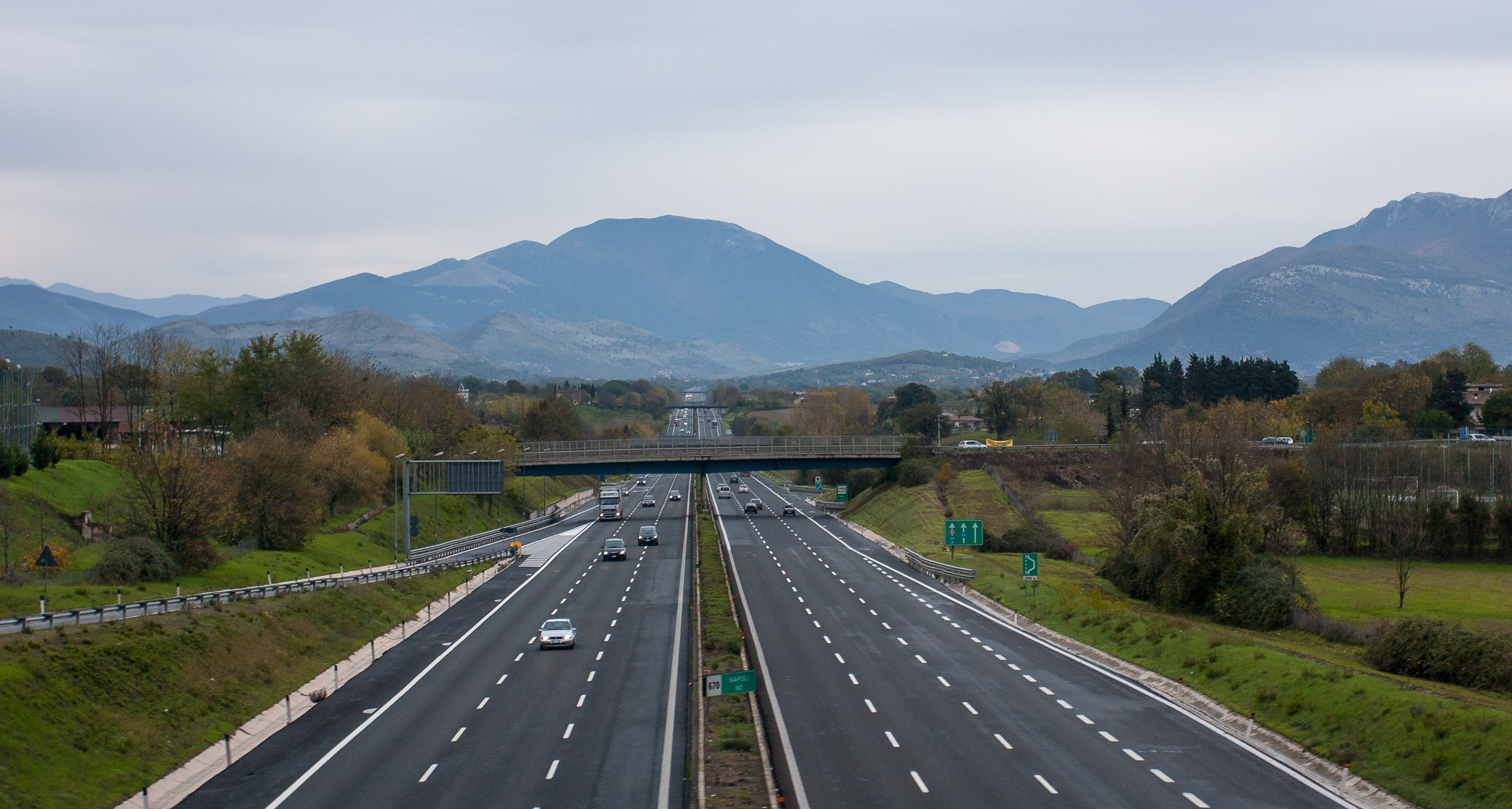
Autostrada A1 runs through Italy linking some of the largest cities of the country: Milan, Bologna, Florence, Rome and Naples.

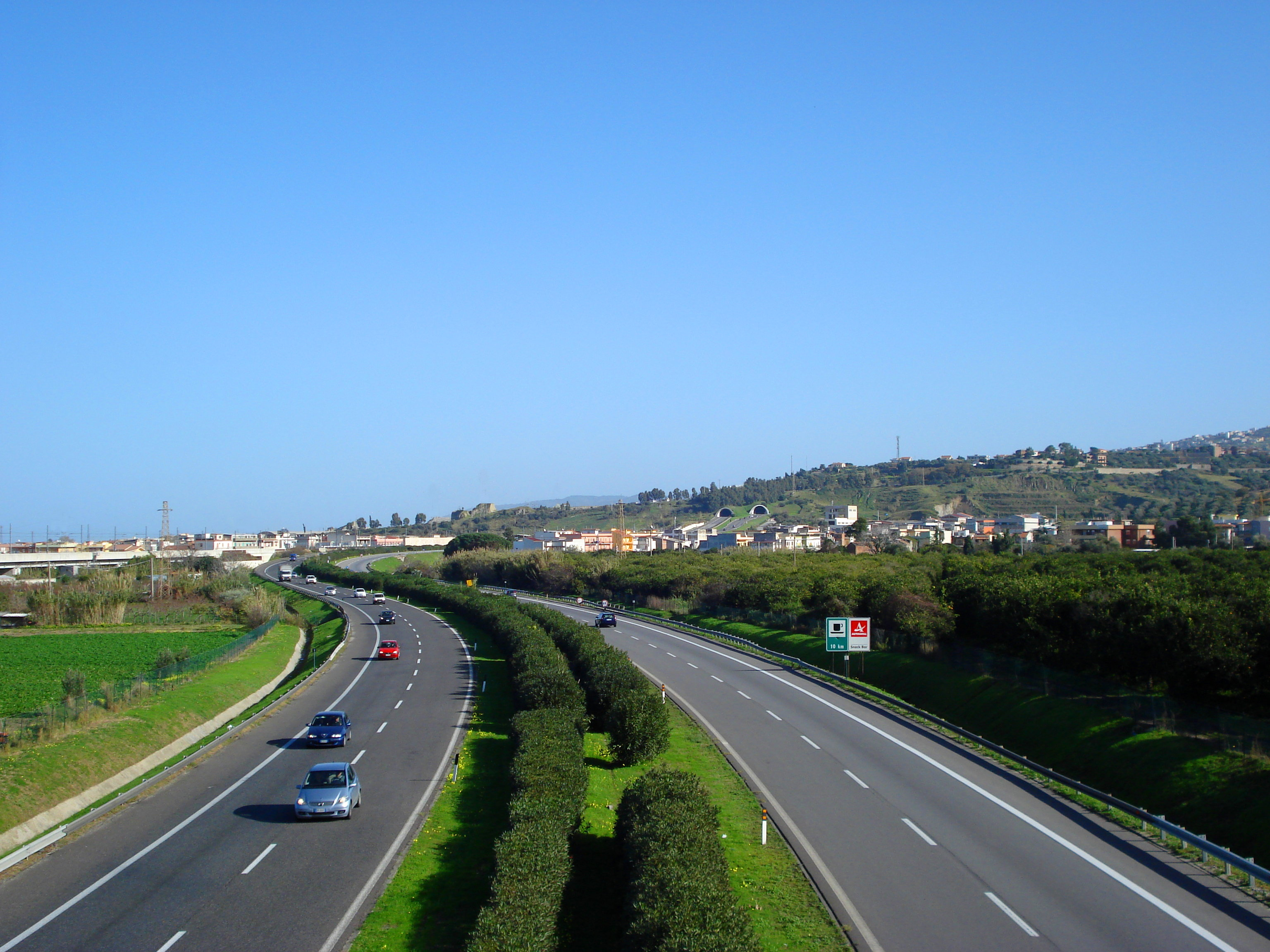
Autostrada A20 runs through the island of Sicily linking Palermo to Messina.

Italy was the first country in the world to build motorways, the so-called autostrade, reserved for fast traffic and for motor vehicles only. The Autostrada dei Laghi ("Lakes Motorway"), the first built in the world, connecting Milan to Lake Como and Lake Maggiore, and now parts of the Autostrada A8 and the Autostrada A9, was devised by Piero Puricelli and was inaugurated in 1924.

Other motorways (or autostrade) built before World War II in Italy were Naples-Pompeii, Florence-Pisa, Padua-Venice, Milan-Turin, Milan-Bergamo-Brescia and Rome-Ostia. The total length of the Italian motorway system is about 7,016 km (4,360 mi), as of 30 July 2022. To these data are added 13 motorway spur routes, which extend for 355 km (221 mi). The density is 22.4 km (13.9 mi) of motorway for every 1,000 square kilometres (390 sq mi) of Italian territory.

Italy was the first country in the world to build motorways, the so-called autostrade, reserved for fast traffic and for motor vehicles only. The Autostrada dei Laghi ("Lakes Motorway"), the first built in the world, connecting Milan to Lake Como and Lake Maggiore, and now parts of the Autostrada A8 and the Autostrada A9, was devised by Piero Puricelli and was inaugurated in 1924.

Other motorways (or autostrade) built before World War II in Italy were Naples-Pompeii, Florence-Pisa, Padua-Venice, Milan-Turin, Milan-Bergamo-Brescia and Rome-Ostia. The total length of the Italian motorway system is about 7,016 km (4,360 mi), as of 30 July 2022. To these data are added 13 motorway spur routes, which extend for 355 km (221 mi). The density is 22.4 km (13.9 mi) of motorway for every 1,000 square kilometres (390 sq mi) of Italian territory.

In particular, 1,870.2 km (1,162.1 mi) of the Italian motorway network have three lanes per carriageway, 129 km (80 mi) km have four lanes per carriageway, 1.8 km (1.1 mi) have five lanes per carriageway, while the remaining part is two lanes per carriageway. The density is 22.4 km (13.9 mi) of motorway for every 1,000 km^{2} (390 sq mi) of Italian territory.

Italian motorways (or autostrade) are mostly managed by concessionaire companies. From 1 October 2012 the granting body is the Ministry of Infrastructure and Transport and no longer Anas and the majority (5,773.4 km (3,587.4 mi) in 2009) are subject to toll payments. On Italian motorways, the toll applies to almost all motorways not managed by Anas. The collection of motorway tolls, from a tariff point of view, is managed mainly in two ways: either through the "closed motorway system" (km travelled) or through the "open motorway system" (flat-rate toll).

Italy's motorways (or autostrade) have a standard speed limit of 130 km/h (80 mph) for cars. Limits for other vehicles (or when visibility is poor due to weather) are lower. Legal provisions allow operators to set the limit to 150 km/h (95 mph) on their concessions on a voluntary basis if there are three lanes in each direction and a working SICVE, or Safety Tutor, which is a speed-camera system that measures the average speed over a given distance.

==== Extra-urban roads ====
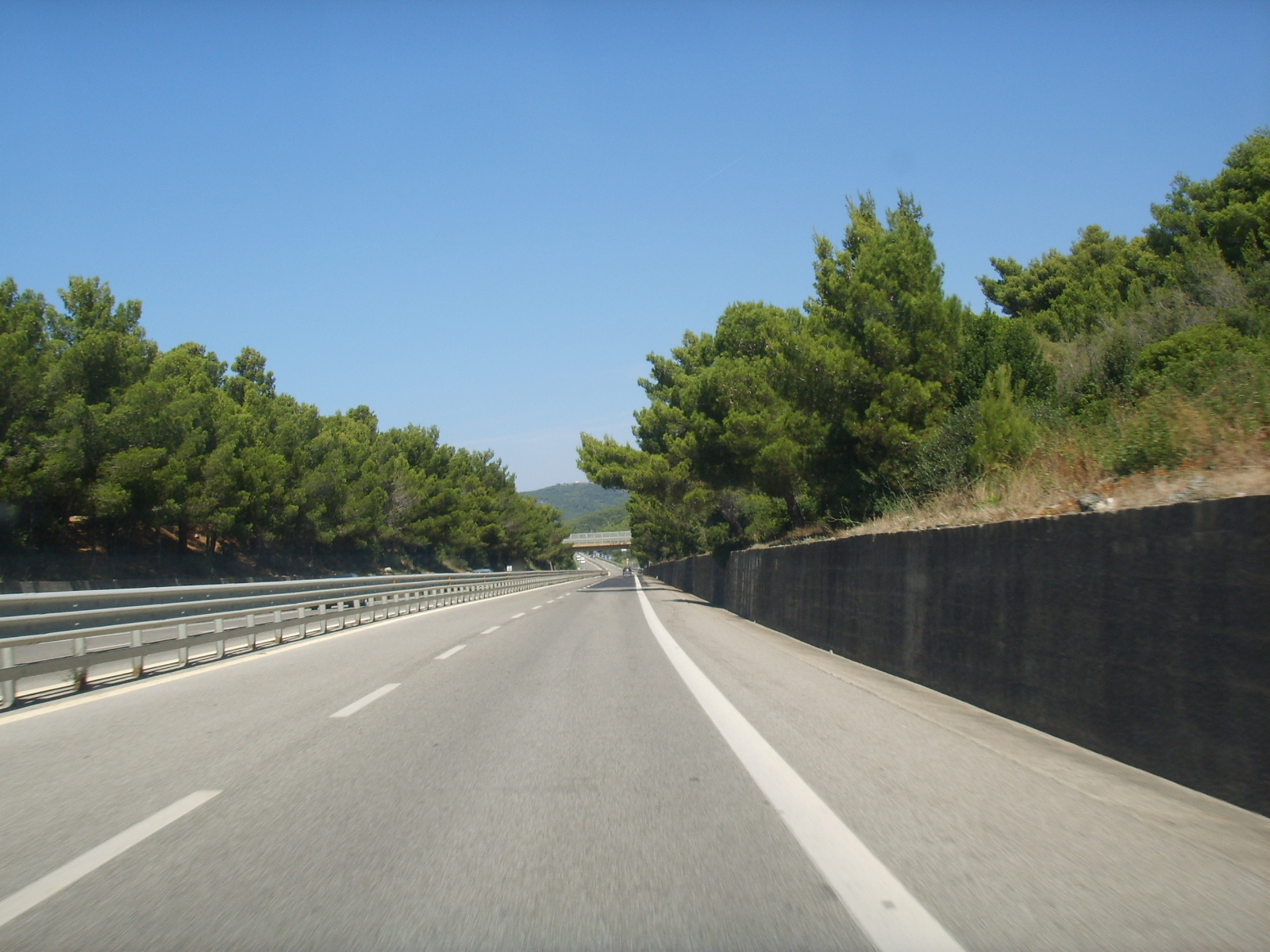
The stretch from Grosseto to Livorno of the Strada statale 1 Via Aurelia is classified as strada extraurbana principale.

In Italy, a dual carriageway is often called superstrada (meaning expressway), but this name is unofficial. Italian traffic code (Codice della strada) divides extra-urban dual carriageways into two different classifications:

- strada extraurbana principale (meaning main highway) or type-B road: a road with separate carriageways, at least two lanes for each direction, paved shoulder on the right and no cross-traffic. This type of road is quite similar to an autostrada or type-A road (Italian official name for motorways or freeways), but its building standards are lower. Access limitations and drive behaviour on type-B roads are the same as the motorways (no pedestrians, bicycles and other slow vehicles), as well as the signage (except for the background color, that is blue instead of green). Speed limits on type-B roads are up to 110 km/h (70 mph). Type-B roads are always toll-free.
- strada extraurbana secondaria (meaning secondary road) or type-C road. This category contains all the roads in non-urban context that are neither autostrada (type A) nor strada extraurbana principale (type B). This means that a dual carriageway that may not be classified as type-B road, since it does not meet such quality standards, belongs to this category. For type-C roads, there are neither special signage nor access restrictions, unless a specific sign is placed. The speed limit is 90 km/h (55 mph), on both single and dual carriageways.

==== Urban roads ====
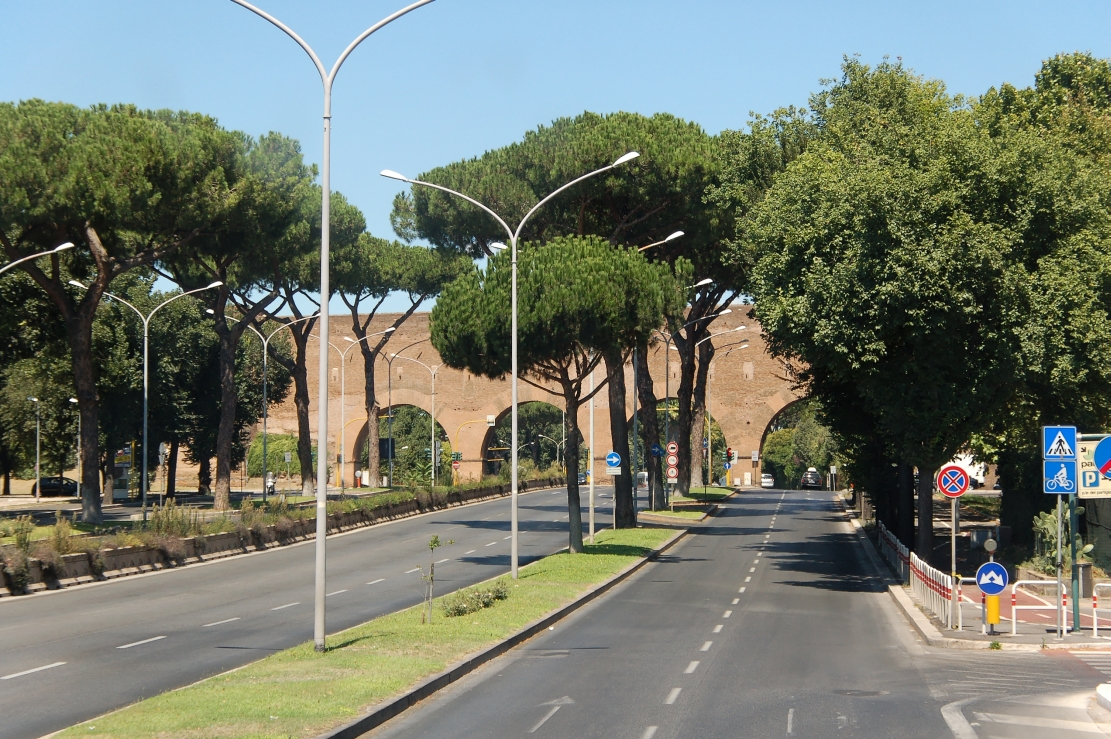
Via Cristoforo Colombo at Porta Ardeatina in Rome, classified as strada urbana di scorrimento

These are the roads present within inhabited centers. Urban roads are of three types:

- strada urbana di scorrimento (meaning urban expressway) or type-D road: a road in urban context, with separate carriageways, and at least two lanes for each direction. At-level junctions with smaller roads, regulated by traffic lights, are allowed as well as roundabouts. Unless a prohibition sign is placed, there are not access restrictions. Speed limits on this type of road are up to 70 km/h (45 mph).
- strada urbana di quartiere (meaning urban neighborhood road) or type E road: single carriageway road with at least two lanes, paved shoulders and sidewalks; for parking there are areas equipped with a special maneuvering lane, outside the roadway;
  - strada urbana ciclabile (meaning urban cycle road) or type E-bis road: urban road with a single carriageway, with paved shoulders and sidewalks, with a speed limit of no more than 30 km/h, defined by specific vertical and horizontal signs, with priority for bicycles.
- strada locale (meaning local road) or type F road: urban or extra-urban road not belonging to the other types of roads;
  - strada vicinale: is a privately owned road of local interest located outside the town centre. In Italy the local road is a de facto communication route built to access a series of plots of land, or generally to connect to a road.
  - itinerario ciclopedonale (meaning cycle/pedestrian itinerary) or type F-bis road: local, urban, extra-urban or local road, mainly intended for pedestrian and cycle travel, and characterized by intrinsic safety to protect vulnerable road users.

=== Administrative classification ===
==== State roads ====
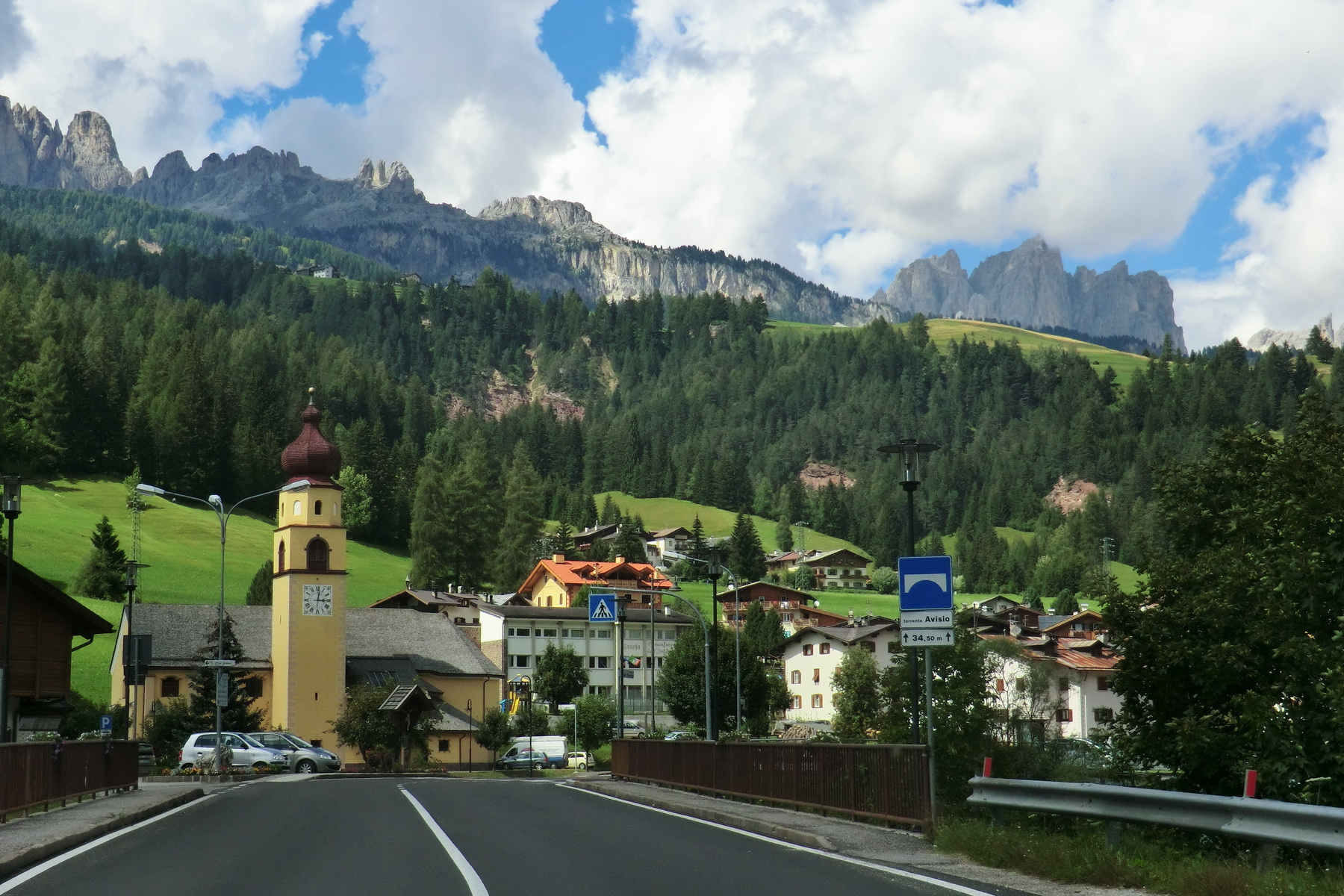
Strada statale 48 delle Dolomiti

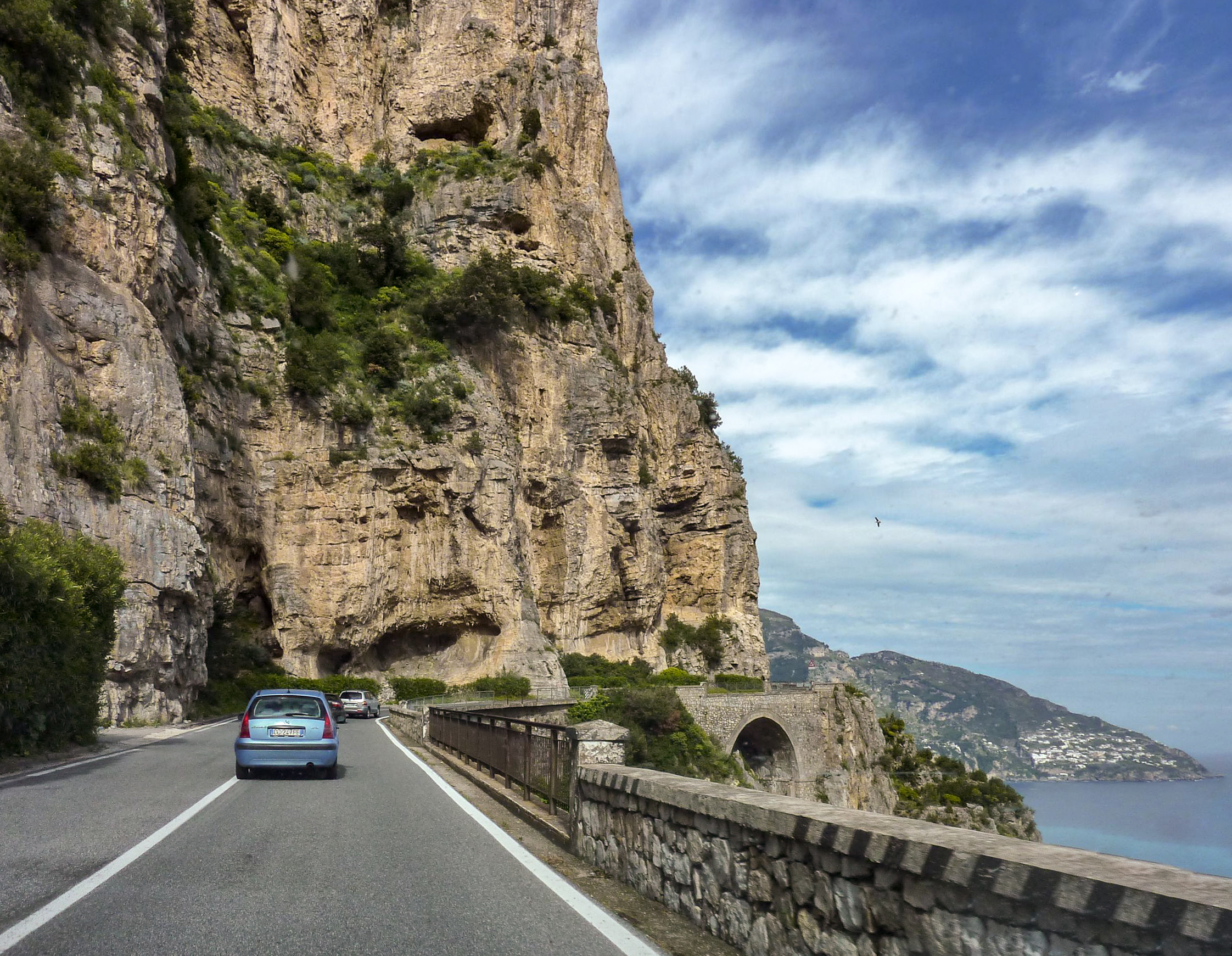
Strada statale 163 Amalfitana

The Strade Statali (Italian: [ˈstraːde staˈtaːli]; sing. Strada Statale [ˈstraːda staˈtaːle]), abbreviated "SS", is the Italian national network of state highways. The total length for this network is about 25,000 km (16,000 mi). The Italian state highway network are maintained by ANAS. From 1928 until 1946 state highways were maintained by Azienda Autonoma Statale della Strada (AASS). The routes of some state highways derive from ancient Roman roads, such as the Strada statale 7 Via Appia, which broadly follows the route of the Roman road of the same name.

State highways can be technically defined as main extra-urban roads (type B road) or as secondary extra-urban roads (type C road). State highways that cross towns with a population of at least 10,000 inhabitants are urban roads (type D and E) under the jurisdiction of the relevant comuni. The state highway that cross towns or villages with a population of less than 10,000 inhabitants are urban roads (type D and E) under the jurisdiction of the comune, subject to authorization from ANAS.

The Italian state highway network has approximately 25,000 km (16,000 mi) of roads identified with the acronym SS. The body that manages these roads, with full state participation, is ANAS (National Autonomous Roads Company), founded in 1946, on the ashes of the old AASS (Autonomous State Roads Company) which in turn was established in 1928. Due to urbanization processes, it has abandoned some sections of state highways, following their acquisition by the interested comuni, who now take care of their maintenance.

==== Regional roads ====
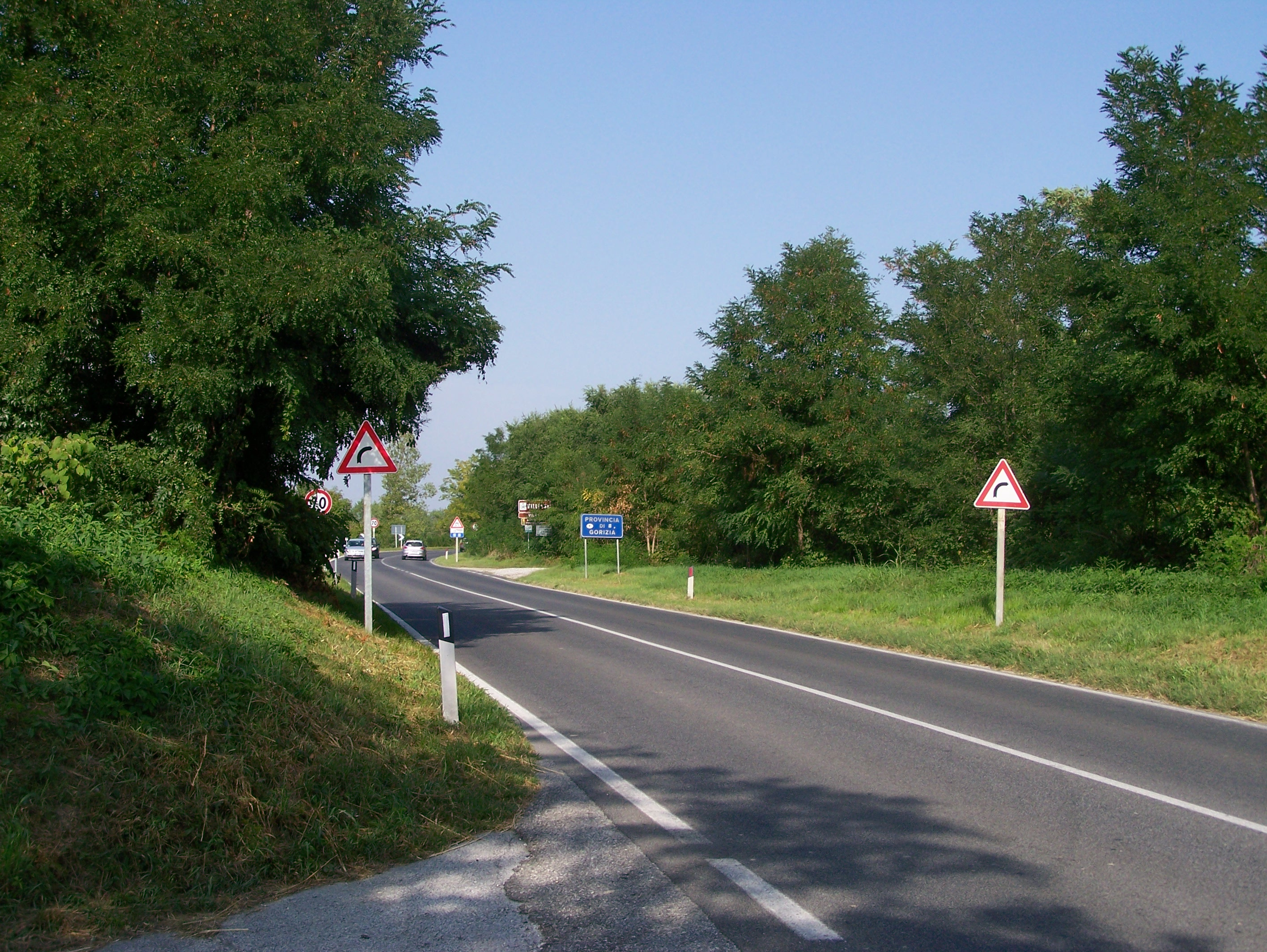
Regional road number 351 (SR 351) in Friuli-Venezia Giulia

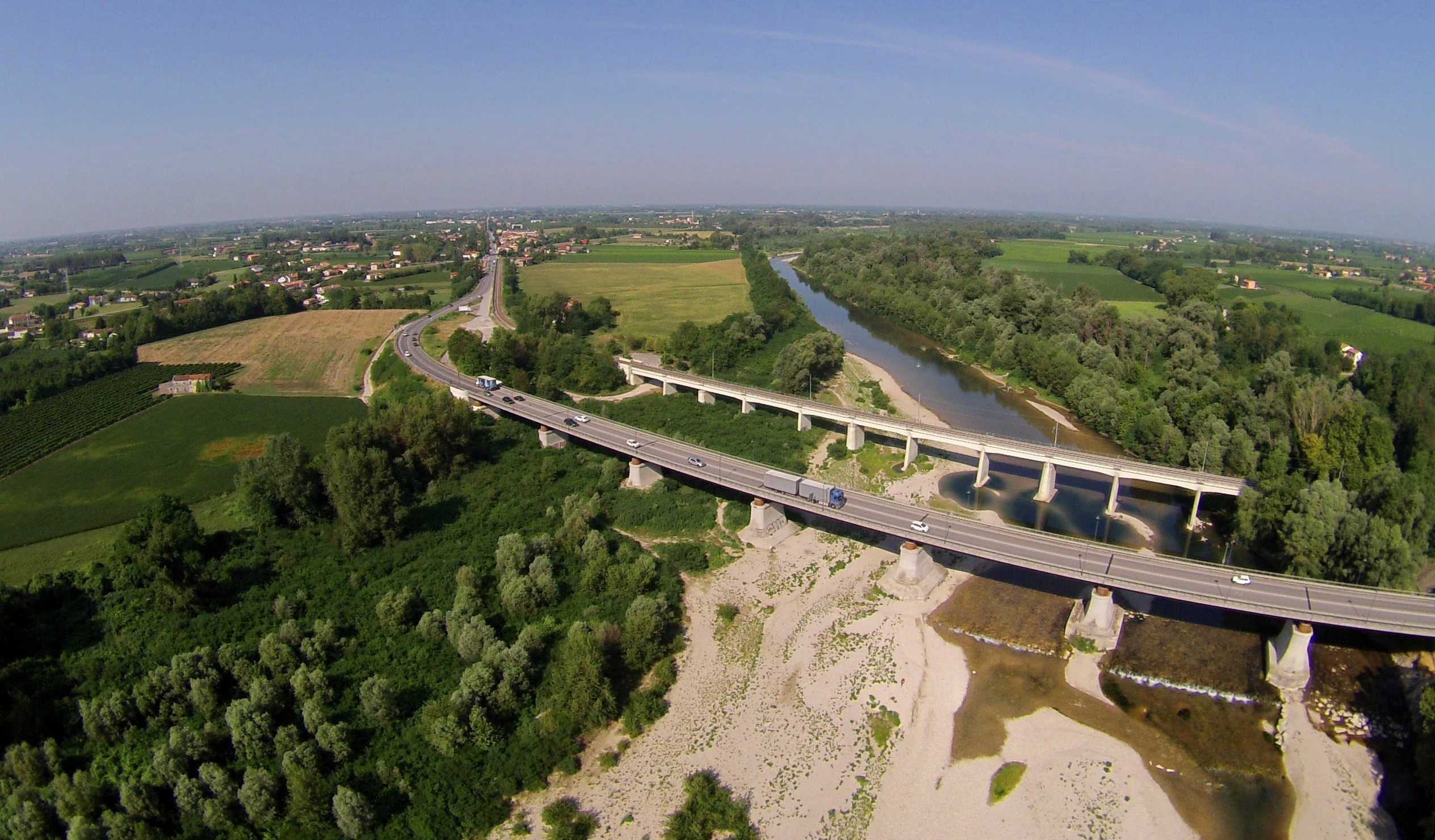
Regional road number 53 (SR 53) in Veneto

A Strada Regionale (Italian for "regional road"; pl. "strade regionali"), abbreviated SR, is a type of Italian road maintained by the regions they traverse. A regional road is less important than a state highway, but more important than a provincial road. The concept of regional road was introduced for the first time in Italy, limited to the autonomous region of Aosta Valley (where no provincial body exists), with regional law no. 1 of 10 October 1950.

The first roads (excluding Aosta Valley) classified as SR (acronym for strada regionale; "regional road") were created following legislative decree no. 112 of 1998, in 2001. In particular, articles 99 and 101 provided for the transfer of ownership and responsibilities relating to state highways not included in the national road network from the State to the regions, which then regulated the matter autonomously. For organizational reasons, many regions have entrusted the former state highways to the provinces, while maintaining the acronym SR.

In addition to these regional roads created following the downgrading of the state network, there are regional roads immediately classified as such (for example SR 6 in Apulia although subsequently downgraded to provincial) or former provincial regional roads such as SR 89, ex SP 62, in Veneto.

The regional roads can be technically classified as strade extraurbane principali (type B road; "main extra-urban roads") or as strade extraurbane secondarie (type C road; "secondary extra-urban roads"). If they cross inhabited centers with a population greater than 9,999 inhabitants, they are roads under municipal jurisdiction and therefore urban (type D and E). If they pass through centers or inhabited areas with a population of less than 9,999 inhabitants, they are urban (type D and E), but the responsibility remains with the manager.

In addition to the roads identified by the acronym SR, there are roads managed by the region but identified by the acronym SP (for example, many SPs in the province of Belluno are managed by the Veneto Strade company with a 30% stake in the region of the same name).

==== Provincial roads ====
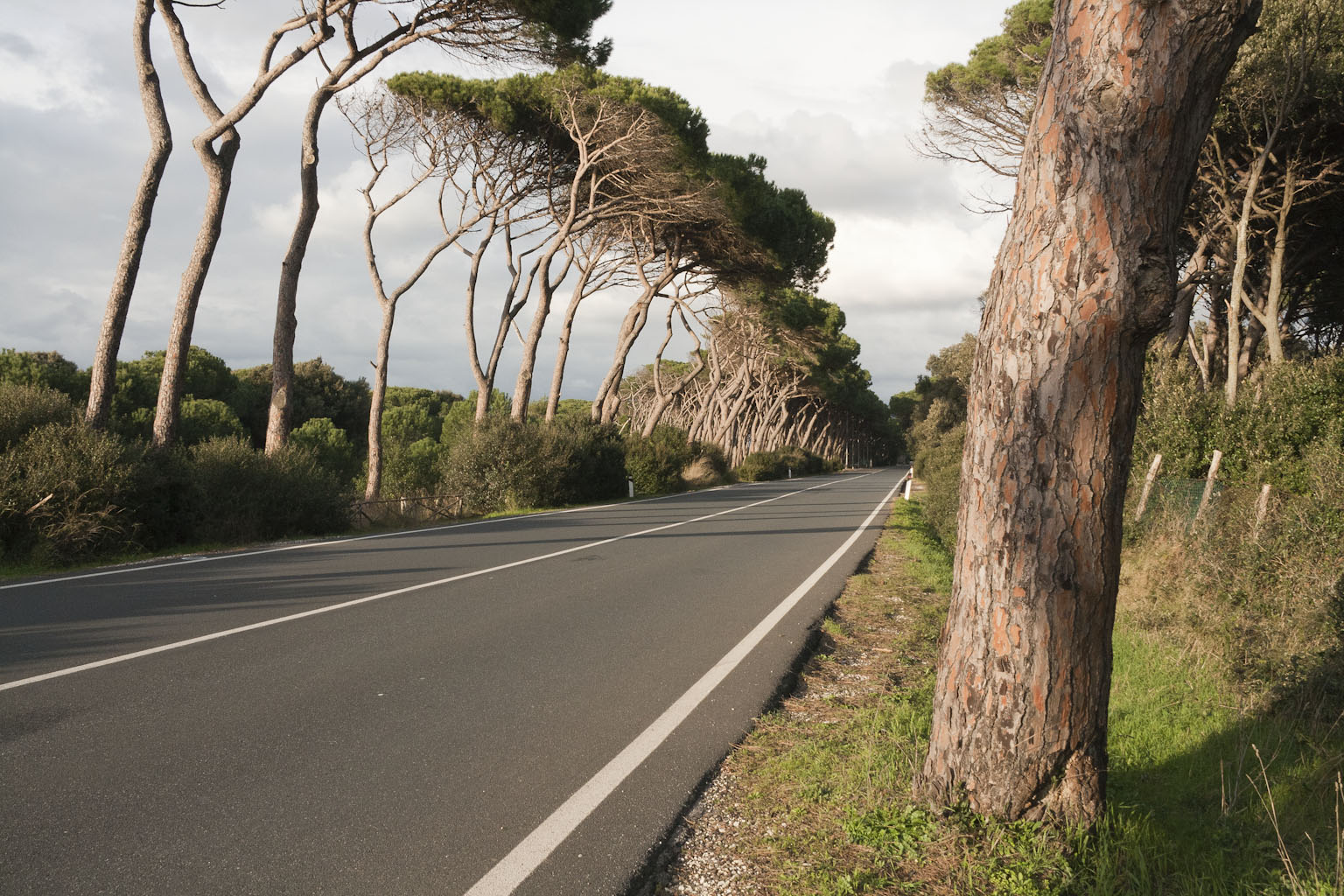
Provincial road number 23 (SP 23) in the province of Livorno (Tuscany region)

A Strada Provinciale (Italian for "provincial road"; pl. "strade provinciali"), abbreviated SP, is an Italian road that is maintained by provinces or metropolitan cities. In Veneto from 2002, state highways downgraded as provincial roads are maintained by the regional company Veneto Strade. A provincial road is less important than a regional road, but more important than municipal roads.

Before the entry into force of the new Italian traffic code (legislative decree n° 285 of 30 April 1992) the provincial classification of a road had to take place by decree of the Minister of Public Works; over the years, this has made the same procedures too centralized and therefore slower and more difficult, until the new Italian traffic code assigned the competence on classification to the regions (Veneto, however, has further devolved the competences of classification and declassification to the provinces themselves).

==== Municipal roads ====
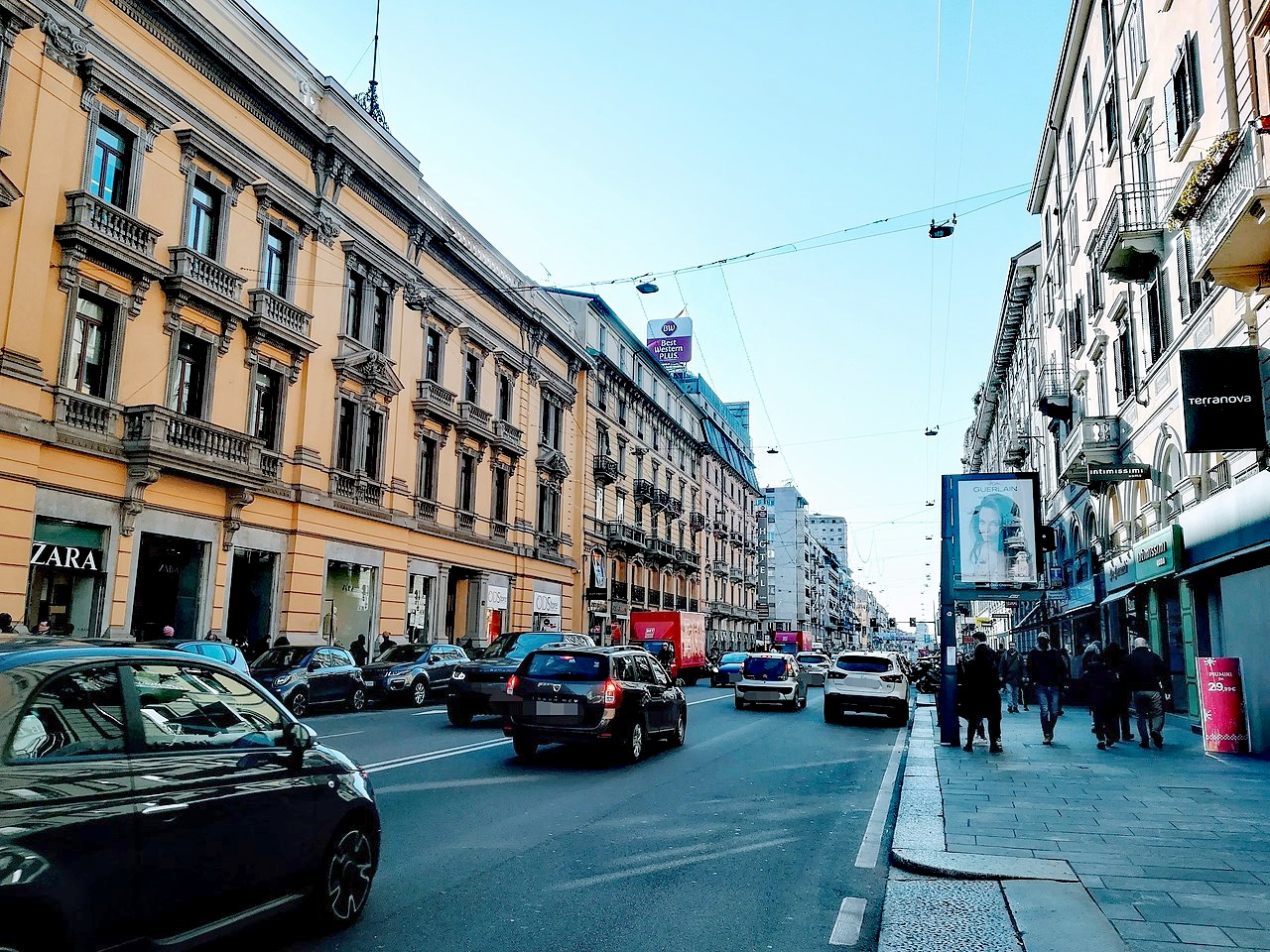
Corso Buenos Aires in Milan, an urban municipal road

A Strada Comunale (Italian for "municipal road"; pl. "strade comunali"), abbreviated SC, is an Italian road that is maintained by comune, hence the name. They can be roads owned by comune (inside population centers) or roads managed by the comune (outside population centers). The category of strade comunali includes extra-urban roads considered to be of municipal importance, all urban roads as well as the urban sections of state, regional or provincial roads, which pass through centers with 10,000 or more inhabitants. The urban sections of state, regional or provincial roads that pass through towns with fewer than 10,000 inhabitants are not municipal.

Strade comunali within inhabited centers can be classified from a construction-technical point of view either as urban roads (type D and E) or as local roads (type F). Extra-urban municipal roads (outside inhabited centers) can be technically classified as strade extraurbane principali (type B; "main extra-urban roads"), strade extraurbane secondarie (type C; "secondary extra-urban roads"), strade urbane di scorrimento (type D; "urban traffic roads") or strada locale (type F; local roads).

=== Other classifications ===
These classifications are not provided for by the Italian traffic code.

==== Major communication road ====
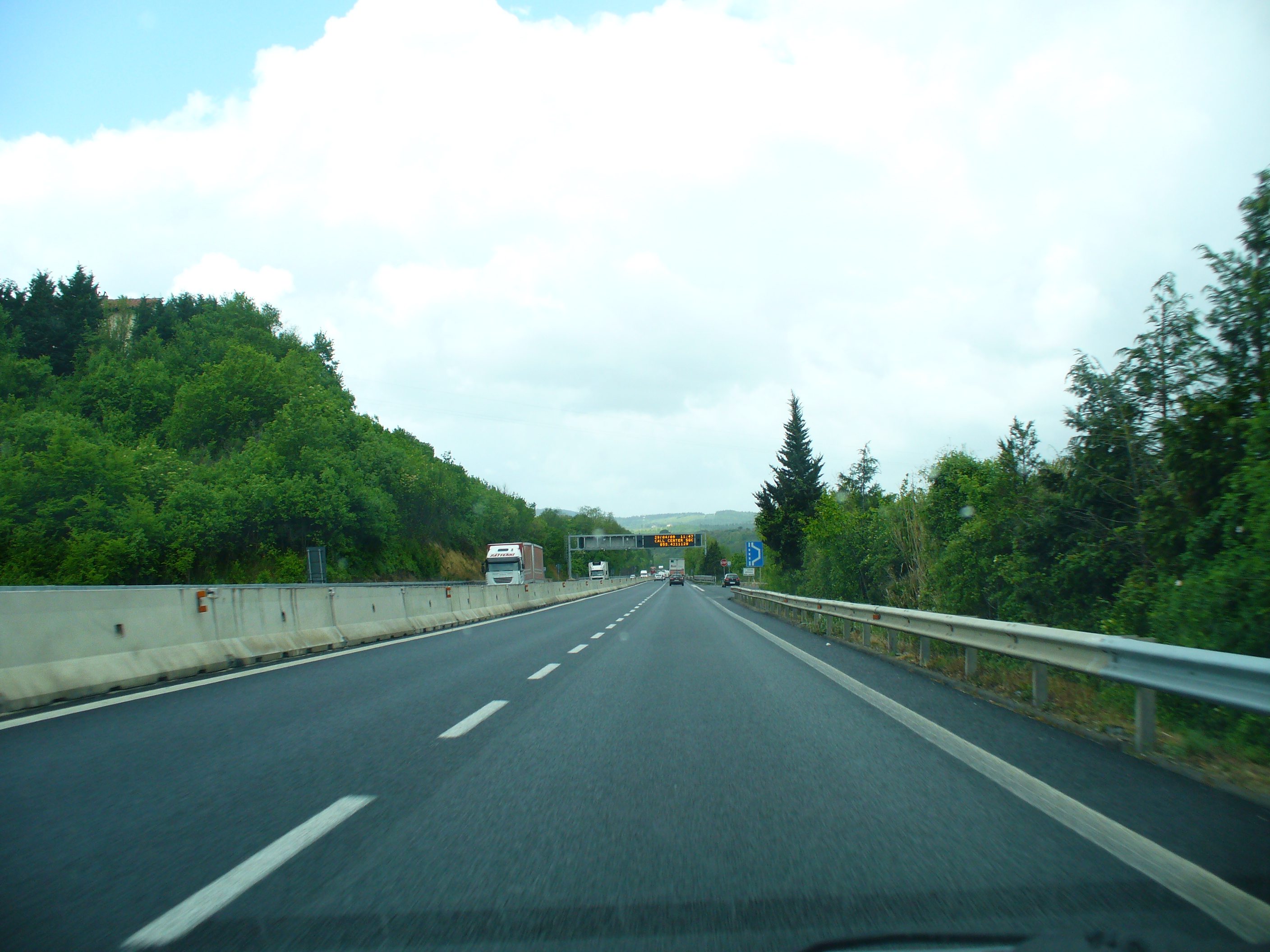
Strada di grande comunicazione Florence-Pisa-Livorno

In Italy, some roads of national importance are called strada di grande comunicazione (abbreviated to SGC; "major communication roads"), an expression coined by the Touring Club Italiano and used in its maps and publications since the 1920s.

Law no. 126 of 12 February 1958, as amended by law no. 167 of 9 April 1971, classified state roads either as major trunk roads or as ordinary state roads.

For law n. 531 of 12 August 1982 (GU no. 223 of 14/08/1982), the main roads were classified as motorways, Alpine tunnels, motorway junctions, and roads that connect the main road network with the neighboring states, roads that constitute the major routes of national traffic (including Sicily and Sardinia), roads that constitute the main inter-regional connections and roads connecting to the first category ports and the most important airports.

The acronym SGC is not used to identify other types of roads (as is the case with the acronyms A, SS, SR, SP) but is used in address documents.

==== Superstrada ====
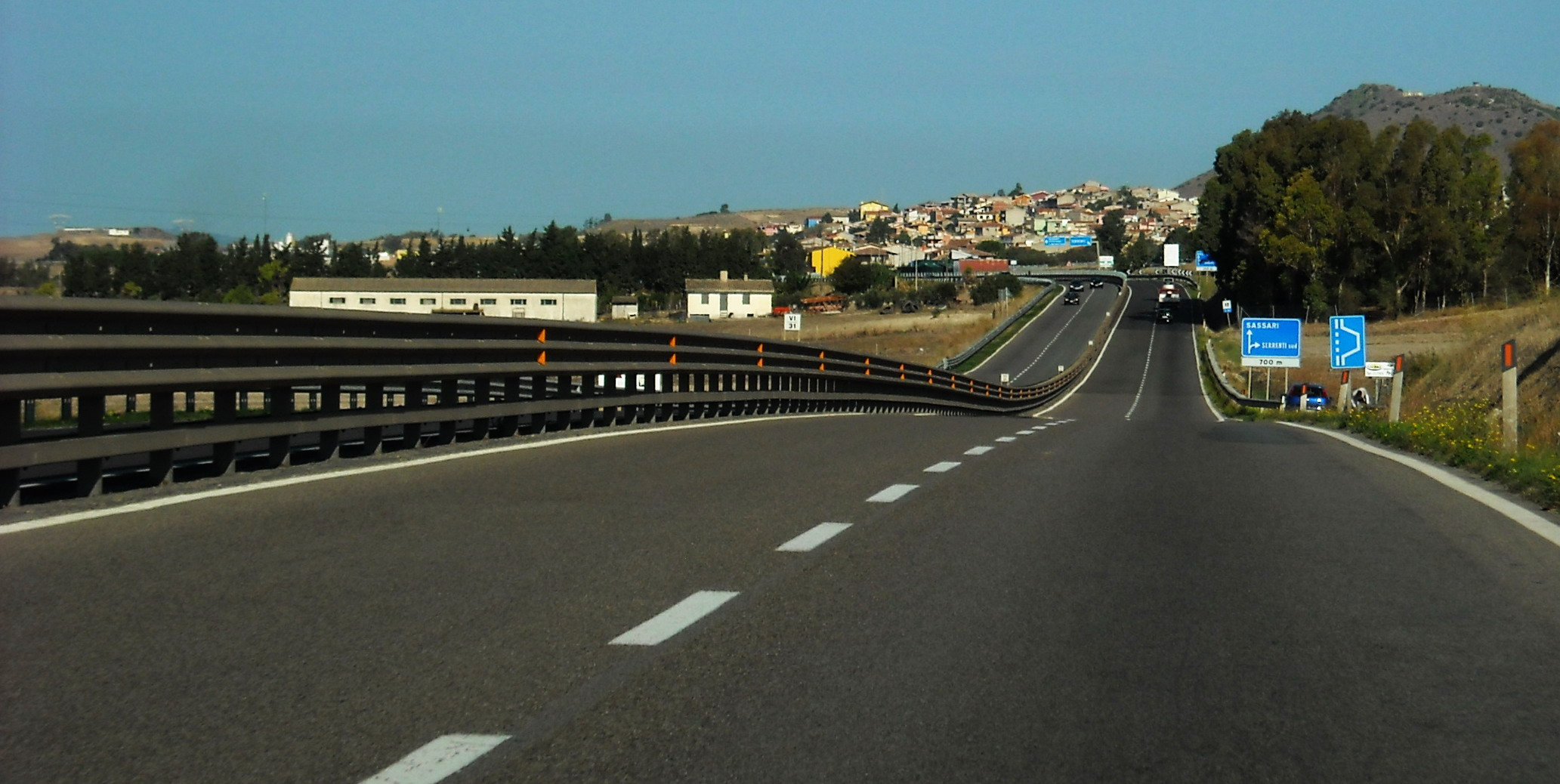
The superstrada Cagliari-Porto Torres (Strada statale 131 Carlo Felice), the main road artery of Sardinia

A superstrada ("super road") is a fast road, often with separate carriageways in each direction, reserved for the circulation of motor vehicles and without at-grade intersections and urban crossings. The colloquial classification of superstrada refers to all roads classified technically as main extra-urban roads and, in general, to secondary two-lane extra-urban roads.

=== European classification ===
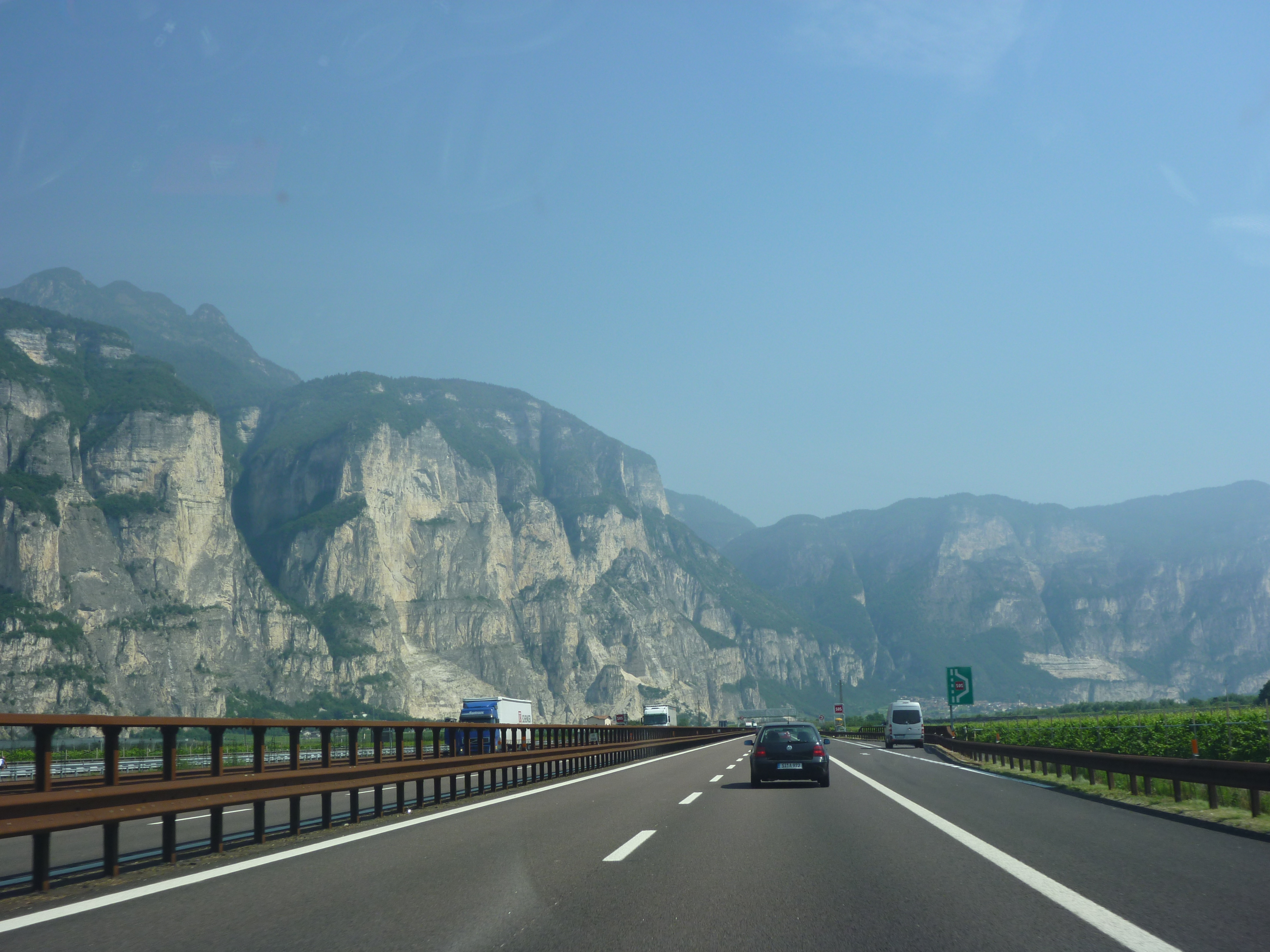
Autostrada A22 (part of the European route E45)

Some Italian roads, if they are part of the International E-road network, are also identified by another alphanumeric abbreviation. This acronym is made up of the letter "E" and one or two digits. The symbol used is a rectangle with a green background with the acronym in white. This classification, which evaluates the importance (being neither a technical nor an administrative classification) of the road in the European Union, complements the usual Italian ones. European road acronyms are mostly absent or reported inorganically on signs in Italy. The European classification is foreseen by the Italian traffic code which defines it as additional.

=== Toll roads ===
In Italy the only toll roads are the autostrade (Italian for motorways). Major exceptions are the beltways around some larger cities (tangenziali) which are not part of a thoroughfare motorway, and the section of the A3 motorway between Salerno and Reggio di Calabria which is operated by the government-owned ANAS. Both are toll free.

On Italian motorways, the toll applies to almost all motorways not managed by Anas. The collection of motorway tolls, from a tariff point of view, is managed mainly in two ways: either through the "closed motorway system" (km travelled) or through the "open motorway system" (flat-rate toll).

== Waterways ==
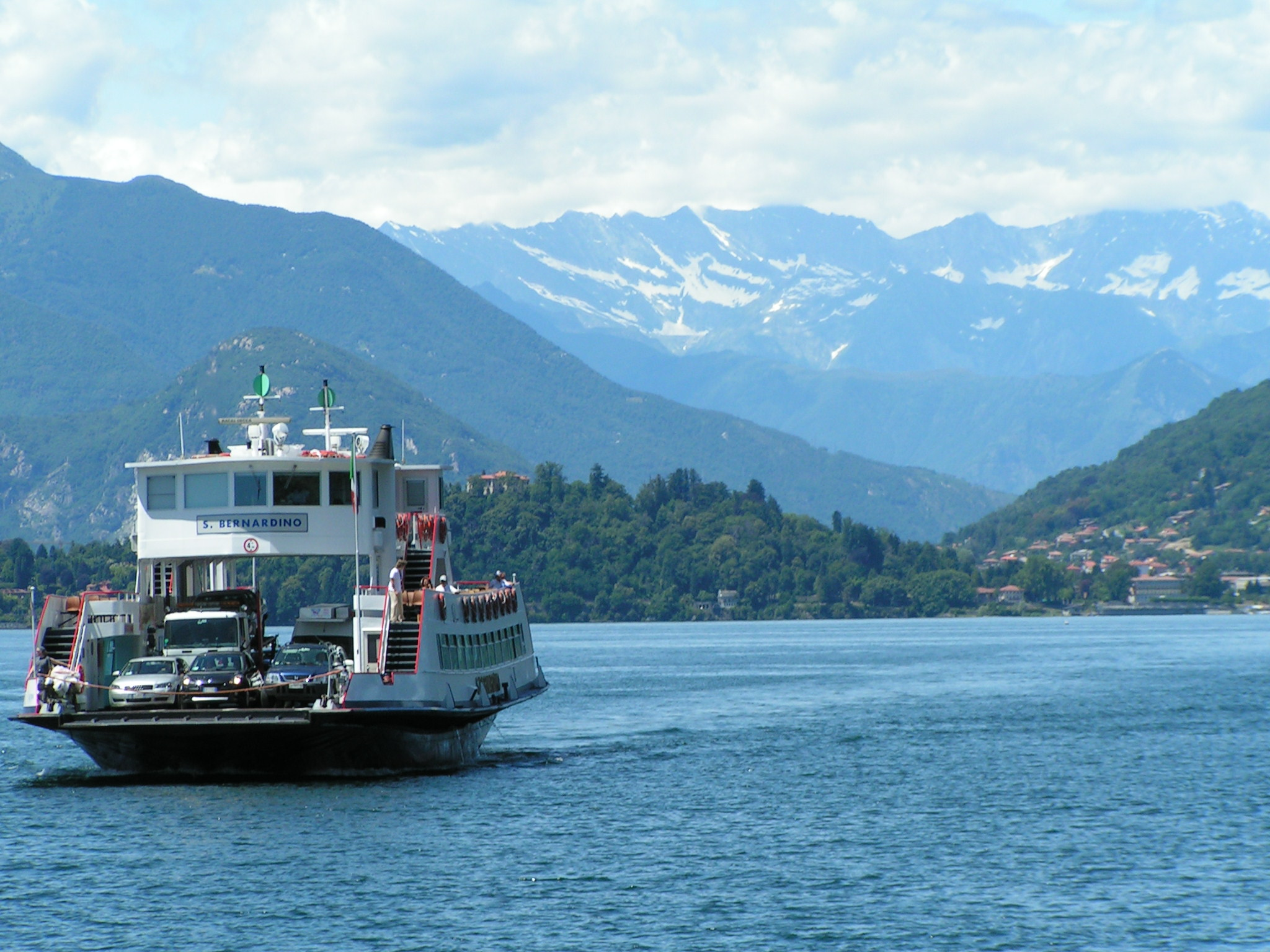
Car ferry across Lake Maggiore from Verbania (Piedmont) to Laveno (Lombardy). In the background Monte Rosa mountain chain and Verbania

Italy has 2,400 km (1,491 mi) of navigable waterways for various types of commercial traffic, although of limited overall value.

In the northern regions of Lombardy and Veneto, commuter ferry boats operate on Lake Garda and Lake Como to connect towns and villages at both sides of the lakes. The waterways in Venice, including the Grand Canal, serve as the vital transportation network for local residents and tourists.

Frequent shuttle ferries (vaporetta) connect different points on the main island of Venice and other outlying islands of the lagoon. In addition, there are direct shuttle boats between Venice and the Venice Marco Polo Airport.

== Ports and harbours ==
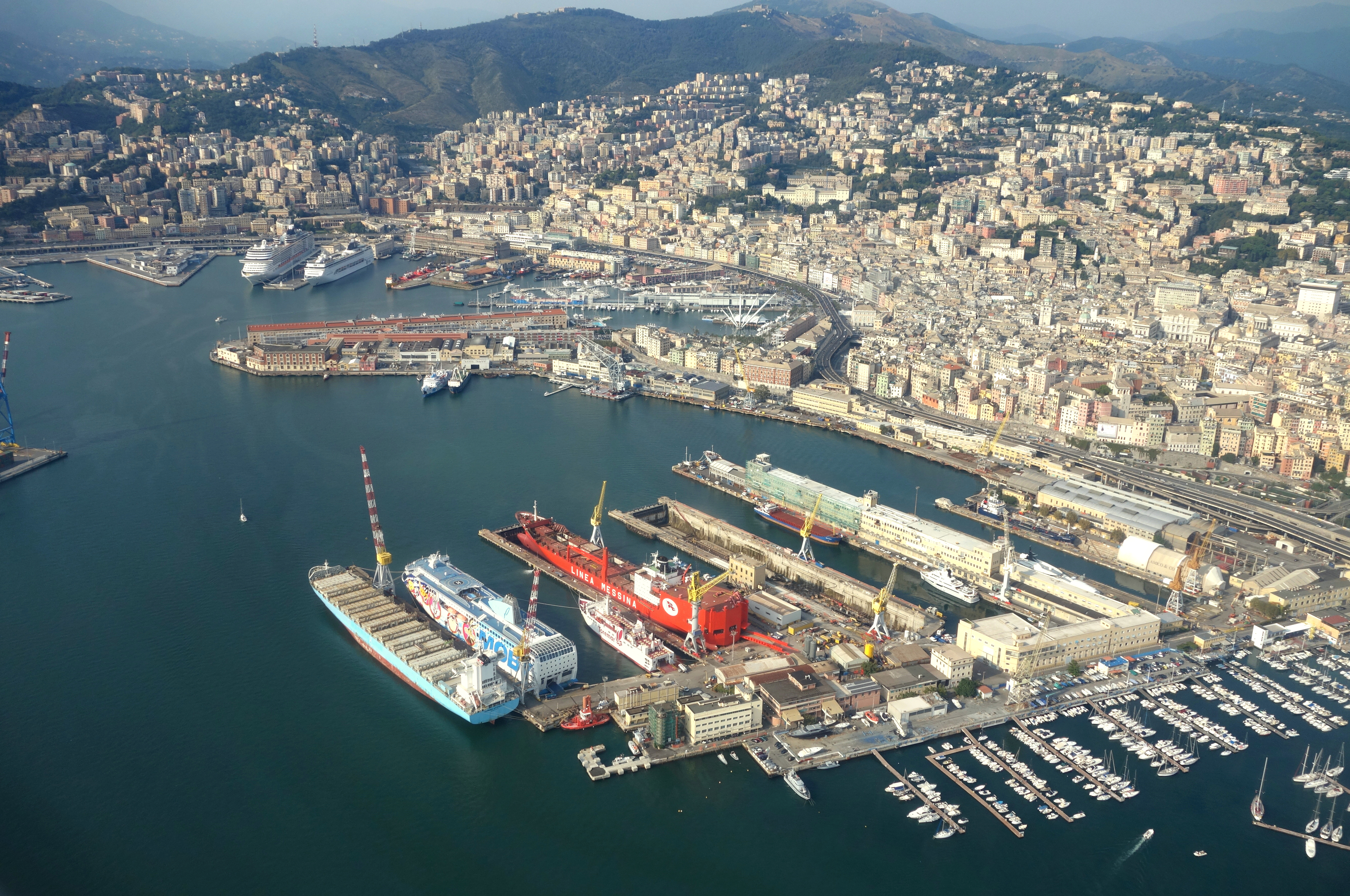
Genoa has one of the busiest seaports in Italy.

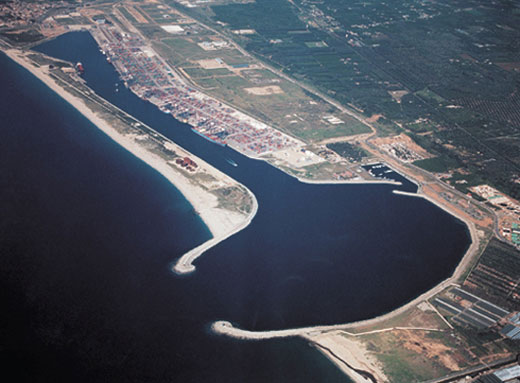
Gioia Tauro port

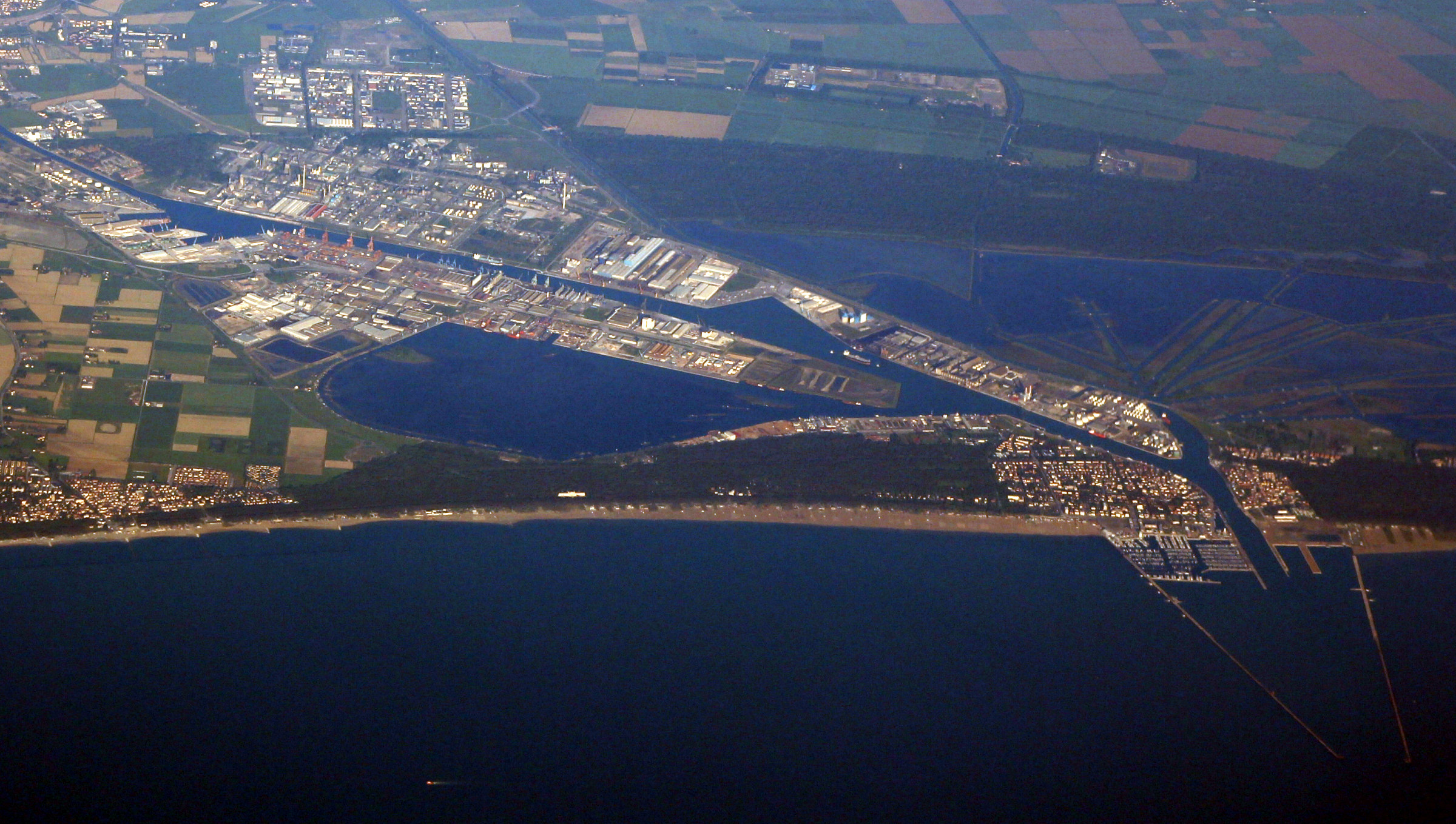
Ravenna port

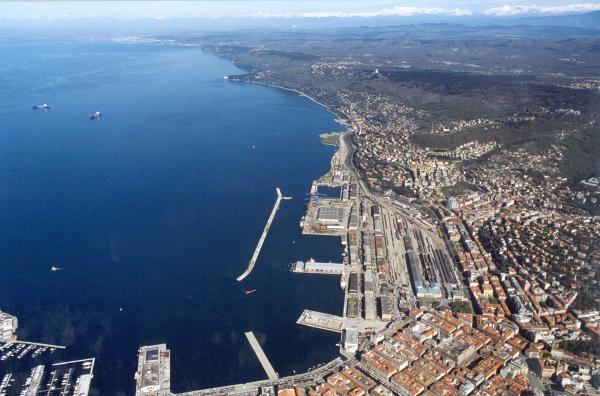
Trieste, the main port of the northern Adriatic and starting point of the Transalpine Pipeline

Italy has been the final destination of the Silk Road for many centuries. In particular, the construction of the Suez Canal intensified sea trade with East Africa and Asia from the 19th century. Since the end of the Cold War and increasing European integration, the trade relations, which were often interrupted in the 20th century, have intensified again. Because of its long seacoast, Italy also has many harbors for the transportation of both goods and passengers. In 2004 there were 43 major seaports including the Port of Genoa, the country's largest and the third busiest by cargo tonnage in the Mediterranean Sea.

Due to the increasing importance of the maritime Silk Road with its connections to Asia and East Africa, the Italian ports for Central and Eastern Europe have become important in recent years. In addition, the trade in goods is shifting from the European northern ports to the ports of the Mediterranean Sea due to the considerable time savings and environmental protection. In particular, the deep water port of Trieste in the northernmost part of the Mediterranean Sea is the target of Italian, Asian and European investments.

List of ports in Italy
- Ancona
- Arbatax
- Augusta
- Bari
- Brindisi
- Cagliari
- Catania
- Civitavecchia
- Genoa
- Gioia Tauro
- La Spezia
- Livorno
- Messina
- Milazzo
- Naples
- Olbia
- Palermo
- Porto Torres
- Ravenna
- Salerno
- Savona
- Taranto
- Trieste
- Venice

Busiest ports by cargo tonnage in Italy (2008)

Port	Region	Thousand tons	%
Taranto	Apulia	49,522	9.4
Genoa	Liguria	46,469	8.8
Trieste	Friuli-Venezia Giulia	37,195	7.1
Gioia Tauro	Calabria	31,527	6.0
Ravenna	Emilia-Romagna	30,075	5.7
Venice	Veneto	29,920	5.7
Livorno	Tuscany	28,667	5.4
Augusta	Sicily	26,849	5.1
Porto Foxi	Sardinia	26,407	5.0
Santa Panagia	Sicily	17,305	3.3
La Spezia	Liguria	17,014	3.2
Savona-Vado	Liguria	16,370	3.1
Milazzo	Sicily	15,405	2.9
Olbia	Sardinia	12,875	2.4
Brindisi	Apulia	10,767	2.0
Other		129,851	24.7
Italy		526,218	100.0

Busiest ports by passengers in Italy (2008)

Port	Region	Thousand pass.	%
Messina	Sicily	10,380	11.5
Reggio di Calabria	Calabria	10,116	11.2
Capri	Campania	7,169	8.0
Naples	Campania	6,185	6.9
Piombino	Tuscany	5,036	5.6
Portoferraio	Tuscany	3,927	4.4
Olbia	Sardinia	3,567	4.0
Livorno	Tuscany	3,251	3.6
Civitavecchia	Lazio	2,677	3.0
Genoa	Liguria	2,510	2.8
La Maddalena	Sardinia	2,374	2.6
Palau	Sardinia	2,364	2.6
Ischia Porto	Campania	2,342	2.6
Palermo	Sicily	1,949	2.2
Sorrento	Campania	1,887	2.1
Other		24,423	27.1
Italy		90,157	100.0

== Air transport ==
=== Airlines ===
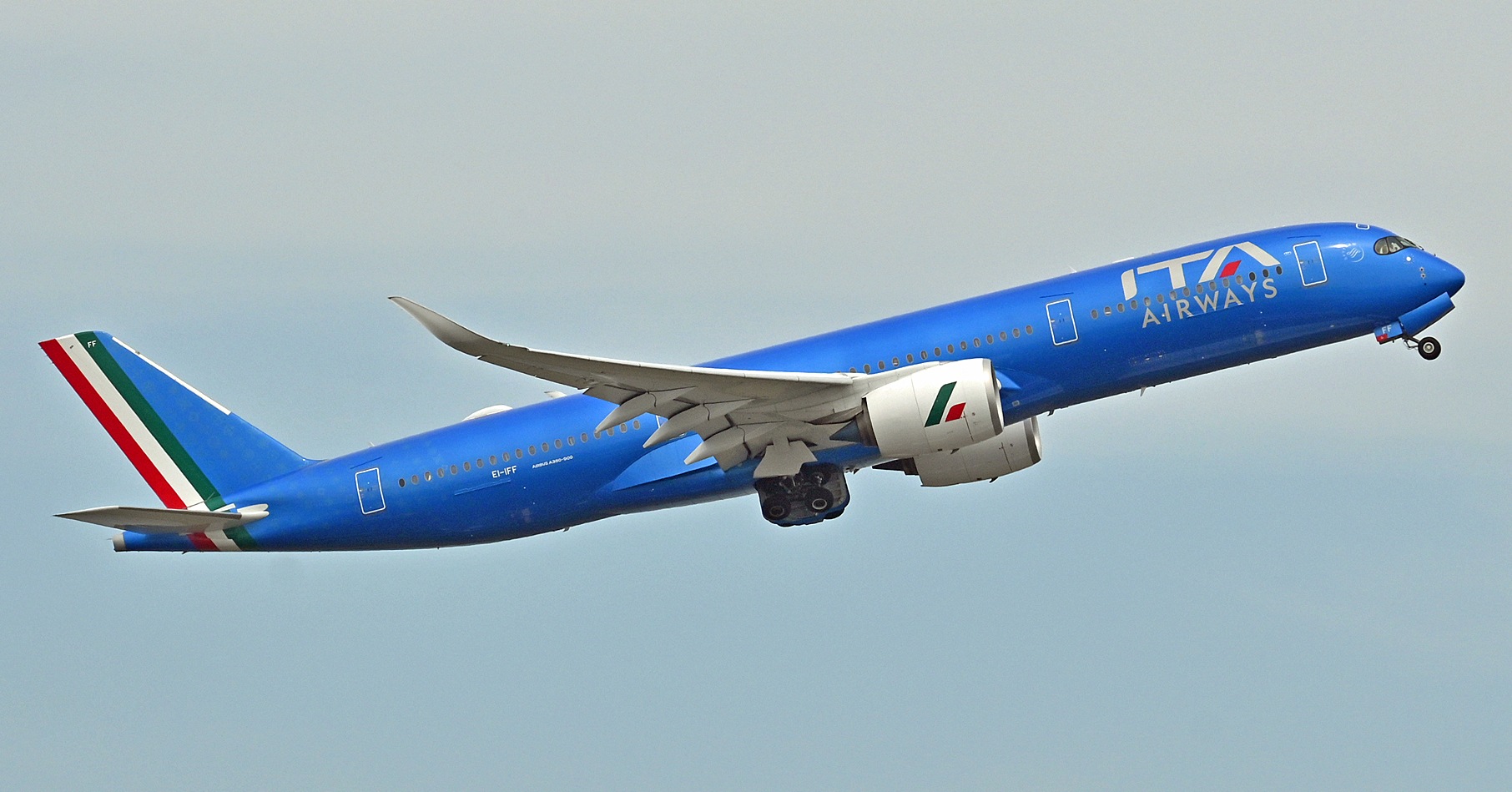
An Airbus A350 of ITA Airways

Since October 2021, Italy's flag carrier airline is ITA Airways, which took over the brand, the IATA ticketing code, and many assets belonging to the former flag carrier Alitalia, after its bankruptcy. ITA Airways serves 44 destinations (as of October 2021) and also operates the former Alitalia regional subsidiary, Alitalia CityLiner.

The country also has regional airlines (such as Air Dolomiti), low-cost carriers, and Charter and leisure carriers (including Neos, Blue Panorama Airlines and Poste Air Cargo). Major Italian cargo operators are ITA Airways Cargo and Cargolux Italia. In 2012 there were 130 airports in Italy, including the two hubs of Malpensa International Airport in Milan and Leonardo da Vinci International Airport in Rome.

=== Airports ===
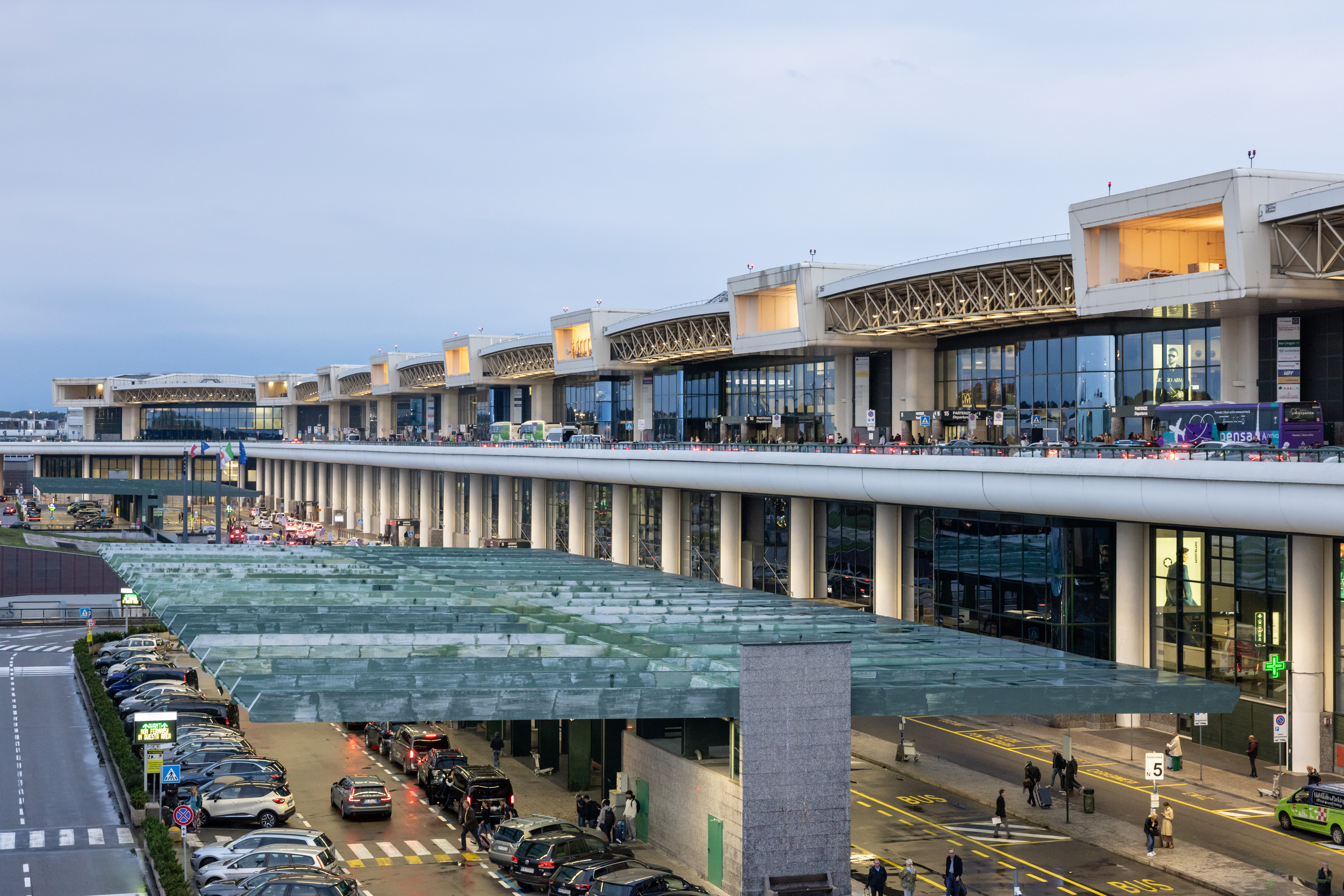
The Malpensa International Airport in Milan, the busiest airport in Italy by cargo traffic

Italy is the fifth in Europe by number of passengers by air transport, with about 148 million passengers or about 10% of the European total in 2011. Most of passengers in Italy are on international flights (57%). A big share of domestic flights connect the major islands (Sardinia and Sicily) to the mainland. Domestic flights between major Italian cities as Rome and Milan still play a relevant role but are declining since the opening of the Italian high-speed rail network in recent years.

Italy has a total as of 130 airports in 2012, of which 99 have paved runways:

- over 3,047 m (9,997 ft): 9
- 2,438 to 3,047 m (7,999 to 9,997 ft): 31
- 1,524 to 2,437 m (5,000 to 7,995 ft): 18
- 914 to 1,523 m (2,999 to 4,997 ft): 29
- under 914 m (2,999 ft): 12

Airports - with unpaved runways in 2012:

- total: 31
- 1,524 to 2,437 m (5,000 to 7,995 ft): 1
- 914 to 1,523 m (2,999 to 4,997 ft): 11
- under 914 m (2,999 ft): 19

=== Busiest airports ===
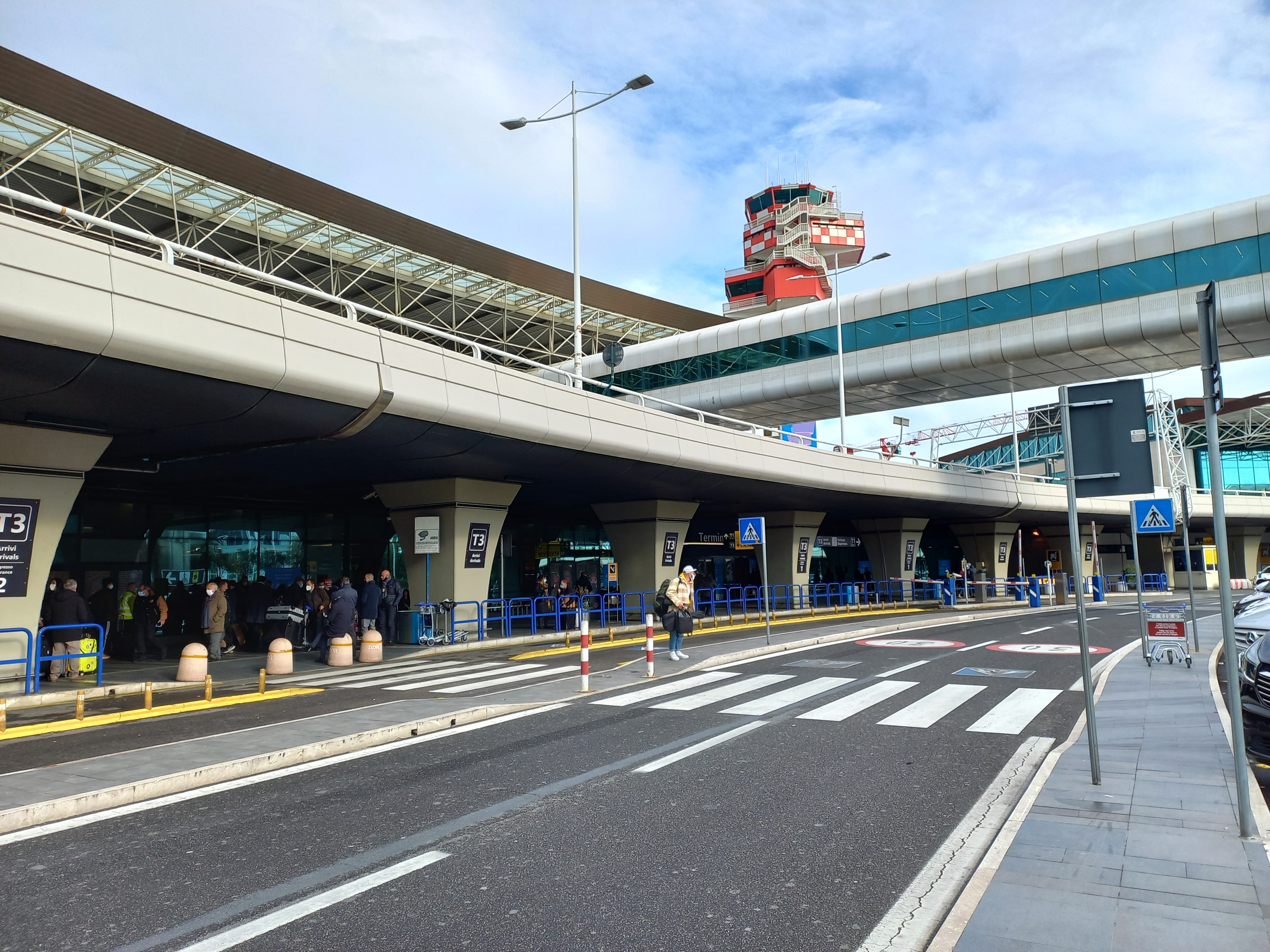
The Leonardo da Vinci International Airport in Rome, the busiest in Italy

This is a list of the top ten busiest airports in Italy in 2017.

Airport	Movements	Passengers			Freight (tons)
Airport	Movements	domestics	internationals	total	Freight (tons)
Rome Fiumicino	297,491	11,462,218	29,378,923	40,971,881	185,898.6
Milan Malpensa	178,953	3,164,224	18,873,017	22,169,167	589,719
Bergamo Orio al Serio	86,113	3,270,761	9,060,022	12,336,137	125,948
Venice Marco Polo	92,263	1,358,618	8,988,759	10,371,380	60,852.8
Milan Linate	117,730	4,927,688	4,575,377	9,548,363	13,815
Catania Fontanarossa	68,170	6,184,360	2,925,385	9,120,913	6,691.3
Naples Capodichino	75,013	2,976,752	5,575,471	8,577,507	11,068.5
Bologna Guglielmo Marconi	71,878	1,935,193	6,246,461	8,198,156	56,132.1
Rome Ciampino	54,236	218,880	5,636,570	5,885,812	17,042.4
Palermo Punta Raisi	46,627	4,399,601	1,353,444	5,775,274	324
Other	463,843	22,018,266	20,254,008	42,430,814	77,727.3
Total	1,552,317	61,916,561	112,867,437	175,415,404	1,145,219

== Buses, trams and coaches ==
=== Local buses ===
Local buses are usually divided into urban (urbano) and suburban (interurbano or extraurbano) lines.

=== Trolleybuses ===
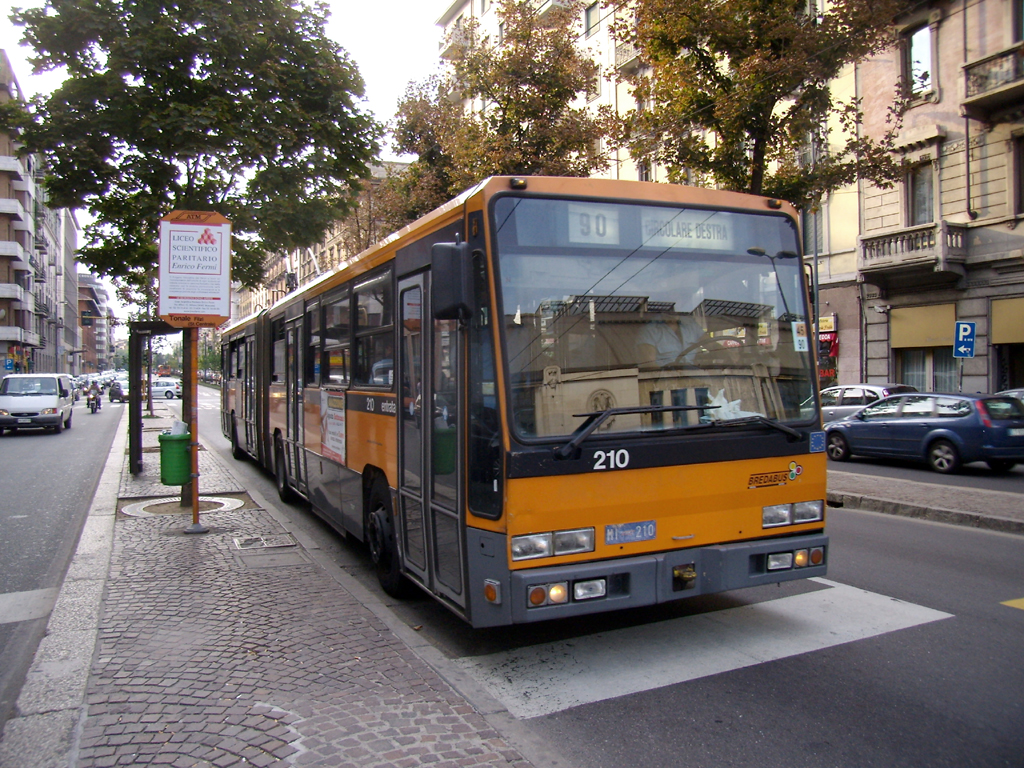
Breda 4001 no. 210 operated on the Milan trolleybus system.

Many Italian cities have trolleybus networks, which were particularly promulgated by the government of Fascist Italy. Though many trolleybus networks were decommissioned in the late 20th century, major Italian cities that continue to operate trolleybus networks, or have built new ones, include Ancona, Avellino, Bologna, Cagliari, Chieti, Genoa, La Spezia, Lecce, Milan, Modena, Naples, Parma, Rimini, Rome, and Sanremo.

=== Coaches ===
Italy does not have a nationwide coach operator. Many coach companies operate regionally, and particularly offer intercity connections and airport shuttle services. The largest nationwide coach operators include Baltour, Marinobus, Buscenter.it, .italo, and FlixBus.

=== Tram ===
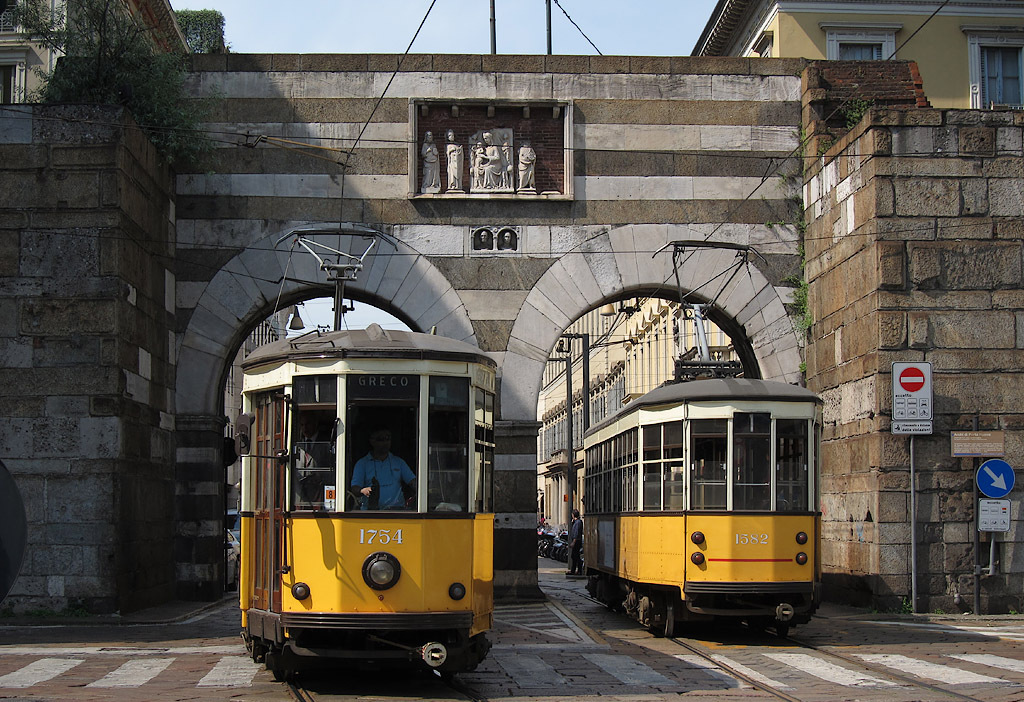
Intersecting trams in Milan under the arcs of Porta Nuova medieval gate. This type of historical trams are also used in San Francisco, United States

13 cities have tram system:

- Bergamo–Albino light rail
- Cagliari light rail
- Trams in Florence
- Trams in Messina
- Trams in Mestre
- Trams in Milan
- Trams in Naples
- Trams in Padua
- Trams in Palermo
- Trams in Rome
- Trams in Sassari
- Trams in Turin
- Trieste–Opicina tramway

== See also ==
- Economy of Italy
- History of Italy
- Plug-in electric vehicles in Italy
- Renewable energy in Italy
- Tourism in Italy
