= Walter P. Chrysler Jr. =

American art collector

Walter Percy Chrysler Jr.
- Born: May 27, 1909; Oelwein, Iowa
- Died: September 17, 1988 (aged 79); Norfolk, Virginia
- Occupations: Art collector and benefactor
- Known for: Chrysler Museum of Art
- Spouses: Marguerite Sykes; Jean Esther Outland
- Father: Walter Chrysler

Walter Percy Chrysler Jr. (May 27, 1909 – September 17, 1988) was an American art collector, museum benefactor, and collector of other objects such as stamps, rare books, and glassworks. He was also a theatre and film producer.

== Early life ==
Chrysler, whose father, Walter Chrysler, founded the Chrysler Corporation in 1925, was born in Oelwein, Iowa. He grew up on the family estate at Kings Point on Long Island, New York.

He began collecting art as a fourteen-year-old student at The Hotchkiss School in Lakeville, Connecticut. Using $350 that his father had given him as a birthday present, Chrysler purchased a small watercolor landscape that featured an inch-high nude, and he brought the painting to his room at school. His dorm master, believing that it was improper for a young gentleman to display a picture of a nude woman, confiscated the picture and destroyed it. The painting was by Renoir.

Chrysler went on to Dartmouth College, where he started an art magazine called Five Arts with a fellow student and future art collector, Nelson Rockefeller. Leaving Dartmouth after his junior year in 1931, Chrysler embarked on a grand tour of Europe and met Pablo Picasso, Georges Braque, Juan Gris, Henri Matisse, Fernand Léger, and other avant-garde artists in Paris. He bought works from each and soon amassed a large collection of modern art. He also bought works by significant American artists such as Charles Burchfield, John Marin, and Thomas Hart Benton.

== Career ==
In 1934, Chrysler founded the Airtemp division of Chrysler Corporation, which developed the first automotive air-conditioning system. After establishing worldwide distribution, he transferred the patent to the parent company but remained a director. In the following year he became president of the Chrysler Building; he continued in that position until 1953.

On April 10, 1942, four months after the Japanese attack on Pearl Harbor, Chrysler enlisted as a lieutenant junior grade in the U.S. Navy. He served as an avionics officer.

== Collections and museums ==
When Chrysler's father died in 1940, he left Walter Chrysler Jr. one-quarter of an $8.8 million estate, together with real property, stocks, bonds, and trust funds. In 1956, Chrysler retired fully from business life to devote himself to the arts.

By this time, Chrysler had established a large art collection. In addition to his paintings, he had amassed an 8,000-piece collection of glass with holdings of Art Nouveau and 19th-century American art glass, perhaps inspired by Chrysler's acquaintance with his Long Island neighbor Louis Comfort Tiffany. Chrysler assisted in the development of the Museum of Modern Art in New York City, serving as the first chairman of its library committee and contributing resources on Dadaism and Surrealism. His works were also exhibited at the Detroit Institute of Arts and the Mellon Library.

Although the visual arts were Chrysler's principal interest, he was also active in theatre and filmmaking. He produced the Broadway plays The Strong Are Lonely and New Faces of 1952, the latter helping to launch the careers of Eartha Kitt and Mel Brooks. Chrysler also produced the film The Joe Louis Story in 1953.

=== Controversy ===
Chrysler purchased a disused church in Provincetown, Massachusetts in 1958 for use as the Chrysler Art Museum of Provincetown. In 1962, Chrysler's art collection from his Provincetown museum was displayed at the National Gallery of Canada in Ottawa, Ontario. The Art Dealers Association of America asserted that 90 of the 187 exhibited paintings were fakes. That same year, at Picasso's 80th birthday exhibition at the Museum of Modern Art, the artist himself was shown photographs of six of his works owned by Chrysler, and he wrote faux ("false") across two of them. Chrysler never pressed a case against the dealers who had sold the works to him, but when his collection was eventually transferred to the Chrysler Museum of Art in Norfolk, Virginia, the suspect works were removed. It has been alleged that Chrysler had a reputation for acquiring art works but not paying for them. In 1971, the museum relocated to Norfolk after municipal authorities refused Chrysler's request for tax abatements, although it has been suggested he was asked to leave Provincetown by authorities due to persistent homosexual soliciting.

== Personal life ==
Chrysler married Marguerite Sykes in New York City on April 29, 1938. The marriage was unhappy and short lived, and a divorce was granted on December 4, 1939; a contributing factor may have been Chrysler's homosexuality.

While stationed in Norfolk during World War II, Chrysler met Jean Esther Outland, and they married on January 13, 1945. They lived on the North Wales estate near Warrenton, Virginia, where Walter bred racehorses and Jean bred champion long-hair Chihuahuas. The couple had no children, and Jean Chrysler predeceased her husband on January 26, 1982, aged 60.

Chrysler maintained a residence in New York and a home in Key West, but he died near his museum in Norfolk after a long struggle with cancer. Upon Chrysler's death, the Chrysler Museum received three-quarters of the Chrysler Family Trust.
