= Michele Roosevelt Edwards =

American businesswoman and Republican political candidate

- Other names: Michele Ballarin; Michele Lynn Golden
- Occupation: Businesswoman
- Political party: Republican

Michele Roosevelt Edwards (Michele Ballarin before 2020, previously Michele Lynn Golden and Michele Lynn Golden-Ballarin) is a businesswoman and Republican political candidate, known for her claims to have been in negotiation with pirates in Somalia, her attempts to revive the defunct Icelandic airline Wow Air, and her role in promoting the Italygate conspiracy theory.

== Personal life and education ==
Edwards attended West Virginia University. While a student there, she met a real estate developer 35 years her senior named Edward Golden, whom she soon married. Their son was born in 1981, when Ballarin was 26 years old.

In the 1990s, she was a single mother and working as an executive assistant for an orthodontist.

After Golden's death, she married Iginio Ballarin, described by The Washington Post in 2013 as "a long-time maitre d’ at the 21 Club in New York." She and Ballarin owned an estate in Markham, Virginia named Wolf's Crag, once owned by Confederate officer Turner Ashby. In 1997, Washington, DC's Social Register listed the couple as prominent members of the party circuit. Michele Ballarin became an investment advisor, acquiring several wealthy clients.

In 2020, Edwards gave a video interview in a mansion called North Wales. Edwards told interviewers that the mansion was her home. According to The Washington Post, however, the mansion was listed for sale and its owner had not given permission to Edwards, who is a licensed real estate agent in the state of Virginia, to use the house. The North Wales property has been for sale since 2017.

== Business and politics ==
As Michele Golden, she became active in the Republican Party and in West Virginia politics. In 1984, she was a candidate for secretary of state. In 1986, she won the Republican primary to represent West Virginia's 2nd District in Congress, but was defeated in the general election by Democratic incumbent Harley O. Staggers Jr.

After her failed run for Congress, Edwards focused on sewing children's clothing. She stated "I was known as the Coco Chanel in the children's industry".

Edwards has had many business ventures, including a boutique investment firm, Cambridge Management Services.

In the early 2000s, Edwards was the head of Select Armor, Inc which sold body armor. The company attempted to pivot into being a private military company, described as "a wannabe Blackwater-like company". While many of her ventures were linked to Somalia, she denied any connection between Select Armor and Somalia. Edwards was listed on the website as the "President and CEO" (chief executive officer) of Select Armor, a "woman-owned enterprise". In a 2010 Voice of America interview, Edwards denied she was the CEO.

She is registered to vote as a Republican in Palm Beach, Florida.

=== Somalia ===
Edwards has been involved in Somali politics and humanitarian issues since 2002. She said a group of Somali-Americans came to her. When traveling in Somalia, she described herself as the owner of Lipizzan horses, and prominently showed indications of wealth such as Louis Vuitton bags, Gucci and Armani clothing. The Somalis called her "Amira", or princess.

==== Businesses and private military ====
By 2006, it appeared Edwards had been attempting to set up covert military operations in Somalia. In 2007, she advertised her Gulf Security Group to the CIA as having the "singular objective" of fighting terrorism near the Horn of Africa. It further said Gulf Security "will enable successful mission outcome without fingerprint, footprint or flag, and provide total deniability." The CIA wrote back that the CIA was "not interested in your unsolicited proposal and does not authorize you to take any activities on its behalf."

In 2008, Edwards and ex-spy Perry Davis presented BlackStar to the American military's counterterrorism program, the CTTSO. She said "I'm going to fix Somalia." BlackStar received a $200,000 contract to start work, which was later terminated for noncompliance.

Another business proposal from Edwards was named Archangel. She said it was an "Agency Front", meaning affiliated with the CIA.

She disavowed any involvement with private military or covert operations including these ventures in 2010.

==== Piracy ====
She negotiated on behalf of the MV Faina, being held hostage during the height of Somali piracy in the 2000s. The Ukrainians complained to then-Secretary of State Hillary Clinton in a leaked diplomatic cable that Edwards had "absolutely no authority from the owner of the vessel". At the time she boasted that she planned on negotiating the release of all 17 ships being held by pirates. Despite her claims, the Faina piracy was resolved without signs of her effort.

She also negotiated for the MV Sirius Star.

In 2010 Edwards told William McNulty that she was involved in negotiating the release of Paul and Rachel Chandler, who were captured on their yacht. Edwards also took credit for the release in 2013.

==== Organic Solutions ====
By 2010, Edwards was promoting "The Organic Solutions" or ORGSOL, a company with "intellectual property of ... business verticals to implement developmental commerce". It included proposals for Oasis Bank and Oasis Airways. Edwards and Sharif Sheikh Ahmed created the Oasis Foundation for Hope. Edwards said she has invested millions of dollars in the R&D.

The system fell apart, despite being "cleared by the DoD and the [CIA]", further stating "Sometimes the government can't get things done, and they have come to see us. I can't say more than that. Some things just shouldn't be talked about."

In 2010, according to the United Nations Security Council, Somali officials arrested and subsequently expelled her from Somaliland.

=== USAerospace ===
Ballarin is CEO of USAerospace Partners (or USAerospace Associates), which in the summer of 2019 announced it would purchase failed Icelandic airline Wow Air (stylized as WOW air), with service to resume in October of that year. In September 2019, however, Ballarin's purchase was rejected over delayed payments. Her purchase of Wow's assets—consisting of 160 airplane seats, 500 airline service trolleys, and Wow's brand and other intellectual property—was subsequently completed, but flights did not commence.

One year later, her group made a takeover bid for 7 billion kr in shares of Icelandair, but the purchase was rejected because financing could not be confirmed. Despite this, in a subsequent November 2020 interview with RÚV, Roosevelt Edwards claimed to control a large number of Icelandair shares although none of the airline's publicly listed top 20 stockholders had any acknowledged relationship with her—a discrepancy she refused to explain.

Also in the November 2020 interview, Roosevelt Edwards claimed that Wow would lease ten Airbus A320 jetliners, two of which were already painted in Wow livery, and that service to Keflavík International Airport and U.S. domestic destinations would begin in 2021; however, she would not present evidence of her claims to RÚV, and airport authorities at the claimed destinations denied any recent contact with the group. She also alluded to an incipient "strategic relationship with a publicly traded major company" to provide financial backing for Wow Air, contradicting her September 2019 claim that the airline was "fully funded" at that time.

In 2020, the group announced plans to purchase Alitalia for US$1.5 billion. Roosevelt Edwards claimed that the purchase was being made at the invitation of the Italian government, but RÚV found that plans to reform Alitalia did not allude to any USAerospace or Wow involvement.

=== Italygate ===
Following the 2020 presidential election, USAerospace promoted the Italygate conspiracy theory, which says that an Italian hacker used a military satellite to change Trump votes to Biden votes in key US states. Metadata on the story confirmed Edwards' involvement.

After a letter printed on USAerospace letterhead promoting the theory failed to gain traction, a second firm headed by Edwards, The Institute for Good Governance, released a statement claiming that an Italian hacker had confessed his role in the purported conspiracy.
