= Christ and the Woman Taken in Adultery (Cranach) =

Series of paintings by Lucas Cranach the Elder and his studio

Christ and the Woman Taken in Adultery is a series of around thirty paintings by Lucas Cranach the Elder and his studio, in which his son Lucas Cranach the Younger was prominent. It shows the eponymous scene from the Gospel of John (8:1–11) in the New Testament. The earliest surviving versions were painted in the 1520s by Cranach himself, with the later ones attributed to his studio.

== List ==
Image	Attribution	Date	Support	Dimensions (cm)	Collection
	Elder	c. 1520	limewood	80,5 x 108,2	Fränkische Galerie, Kronach
	Elder	1532	limewood	82,5 × 121	Museum of Fine Arts, Budapest
	Elder	1533	beechwood	84 x 118	National Gallery of Canada, Ottawa
	Younger	after 1532	Copper, transferred from panel	84 x 123	Hermitage Museum, Saint Petersburg
	Elder and studio	after 1537	panel	77 x 124	Nationalmuseum, Stockholm (Note: Includes the inscription "WER VUNTER EUCH ON SVNDE IST DER WERFFE DEN ERSTEN STEIN AVFF SIE: IOHAN: AMVIII CAP" ("Let he who is without sin cast the first stone: John Chapter 8") but no signature. It probably came to Sweden in 1648 in connection with Pragrovet during the Thirty Years' War.)
	Elder and studio	after 1537	limewood	76 x 121	Nationalmuseum, Stockholm (Note: Includes the inscription "WER VUNTER EUCH ON SVNDE IST DER WERFFE DEN ERSTEN STEIN AVFF SIE: IOHAN: AMVIII CAP" ("Let he who is without sin cast the first stone: John Chapter 8"). Bears Cranach's signature, a winged dragon, below the inscription. Based on the shape of the dragon's wings, it can be determined that it was executed after 1537. The painting was owned by Gustav Vasa at Gripsholm Castle in the middle of the 16th century.)
	Younger	after 1537	panel	74,3 x 121,9	Chrysler Museum of Art, Norfolk, Virginia
	Elder and studio	c. 1535–1540	limewood	81,7 x 147,2	Klassik Stiftung Weimar
	Younger	1545	limewood	72,8 x 120	Staatsgalerie Aschaffenburg, Schloss Johannisburg
	Younger and studio	1549	canvas, transferred from panel	114 x 176	Bonnefantenmuseum, Maastricht
	Younger	c. 1545–1550	beechwood	15,9 x 21,6	Metropolitan Museum of Art, New York
	Unknown (copy)	1700-present	panel	92,5 x 121,5	National Museum, Oslo
