= Chrysler Museum of Art =

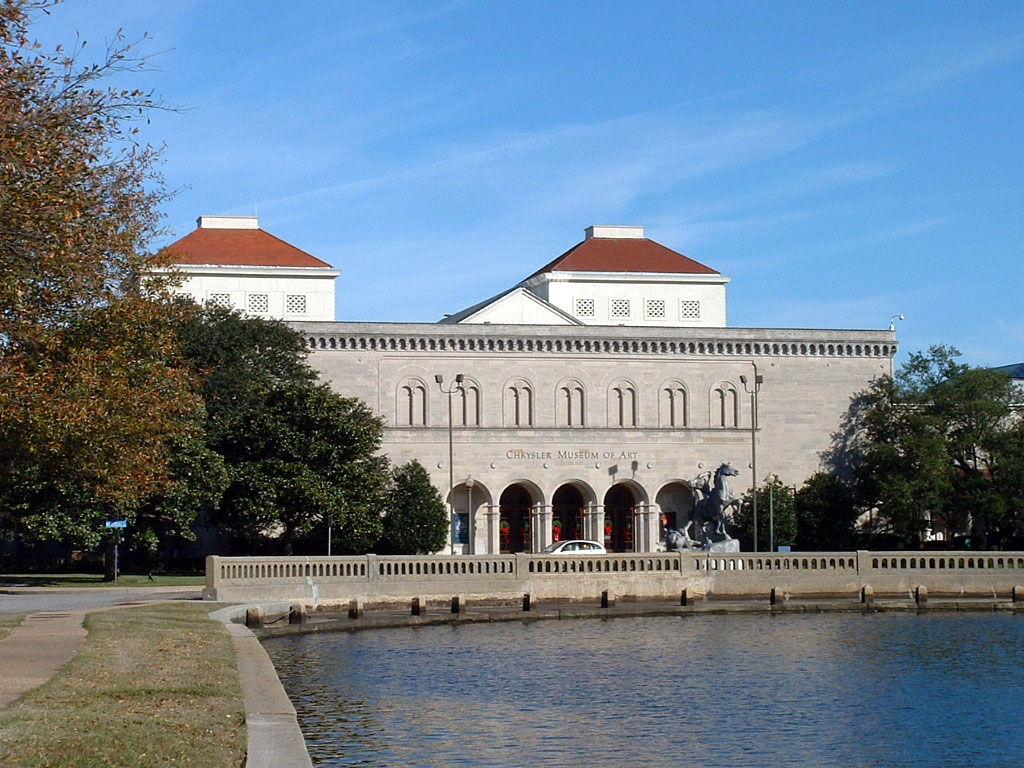
- Chrysler Museum of Art
- Interactive fullscreen map
- Established: 1933
- Location: 1 Memorial Place, Norfolk, Virginia
- Coordinates: 36°51′25″N 76°17′31″W
- Type: Art museum
- Visitors: 200,000
- Director: Erik H. Neil
- Curators: Mark Castro, Ph.D., Director of Curatorial Affairs; Mia Laufer, Ph.D., Chief Curator and Irene Leache Curator of European Art; Chelsea Pierce, Ph.D., McKinnon Curator of Modern and Contemporary Art; Corey Piper, Ph.D., Brock Curator of American Art); Carolyn Swan Needell, Ph.D., Carolyn and Richard Barry Curator of Glass
- Website: www.chrysler.org

The Chrysler Museum of Art is an art museum on the border between downtown and the Ghent district of Norfolk, Virginia. The museum was founded in 1933 as the Norfolk Museum of Arts and Sciences. In 1971, automotive heir Walter P. Chrysler Jr. (whose wife, Jean Outland Chrysler, was a native of Norfolk) donated most of his extensive collection to the museum. This single gift significantly expanded the museum's collection, making it one of the major art museums in the Southeastern United States. The museum has a collection of more than 35,000 objects, including one the largest glass collections in America. Its holdings range from media including paintings, sculpture, photography, and decorative arts. The Museum's campus also features the Perry Glass Studio, a full-service restaurant, a gift shop, Kaufman Theater, and the Goode Works on Paper Center, and it oversees the historic Myers House.

== History ==
The Chrysler Museum of Art opened in 1933 as the Norfolk Museum of Arts and Sciences. It was later renamed in honor of Walter P. Chrysler Jr. The museum's main building underwent expansion and renovation and reopened on May 10, 2014. During the renovation, the Glass Studio and the Moses Myers House remained open and art was displayed at venues throughout the community. The museum's grand reopening included the Rubber Duck floating sculpture from May 17–26, 2014. The museum originally had a courtyard, but during renovations in the 1980s, the courtyard was enclosed thus creating Huber Court, where concerts and events are held.

The most recent expansion was to the museum's Perry Glass Studio, located at 245 Grace Street, which tripled the size of the facility and doubled the educational and programmatic offerings available. The museum broke ground on the new facility in June 2022 and construction concluded in early 2025. The expansion was funded by a $55 million capital campaign, the city of Norfolk, and the Commonwealth of Virginia.

== Collection ==
John Russell for the New York Times described the Chrysler collection as "one any museum in the world would kill for." Comprising over 35,000 objects, the collection spans over 5,000 years of world history. American and European paintings and sculpture from the Middle Ages to the present day form the core of the collection.

The museum's most significant holdings include works by Renaissance artists: Tintoretto, Veronese, Peter Paul Rubens, Gauthier de Campes, Baroque artists Diego Velázquez, Salvator Rosa, Gianlorenzo Bernini, American artists such as John Singleton Copley, Pinckney Marcius-Simons, Thomas Cole, Edward Hopper, Jackson Pollock, Andy Warhol, Richard Diebenkorn, Karen LaMonte, and Franz Kline. École de Paris Jewish artist Yitzhak Frenkel, the French artists Eugène Delacroix, Édouard Manet, Paul Cézanne, Gustave Doré, Auguste Rodin, Mary Cassatt, Paul Gauguin, Georges Rouault, Henri Matisse, Georges Braque and the German Albert Bierstadt.

The Chrysler Museum is home to the final sculpture of the Baroque artist Gianlorenzo Bernini, a marble bust of Jesus Christ created as a gift for the artist's benefactor, Queen Christina of Sweden. The Museum also houses one a collection of glass (including works by Louis Comfort Tiffany), holdings in the decorative arts, and a growing collection of photography. The arts of the ancient world, Asia, Africa, and Pre-Columbian America (particularly Maya ceramics) are also well represented.

In 1999, the provenance and ownership of the sculpture The Wounded Indian by Peter Stephenson was contested by the Massachusetts Charitable Mechanic Association. The sculpture was thought by the Association to have been destroyed in a move in the 1950s. In late 2020, the Association and museum reached a partial agreement where the sculpture's provenance was changed to include the Association's ownership.

== Programs and exhibitions ==
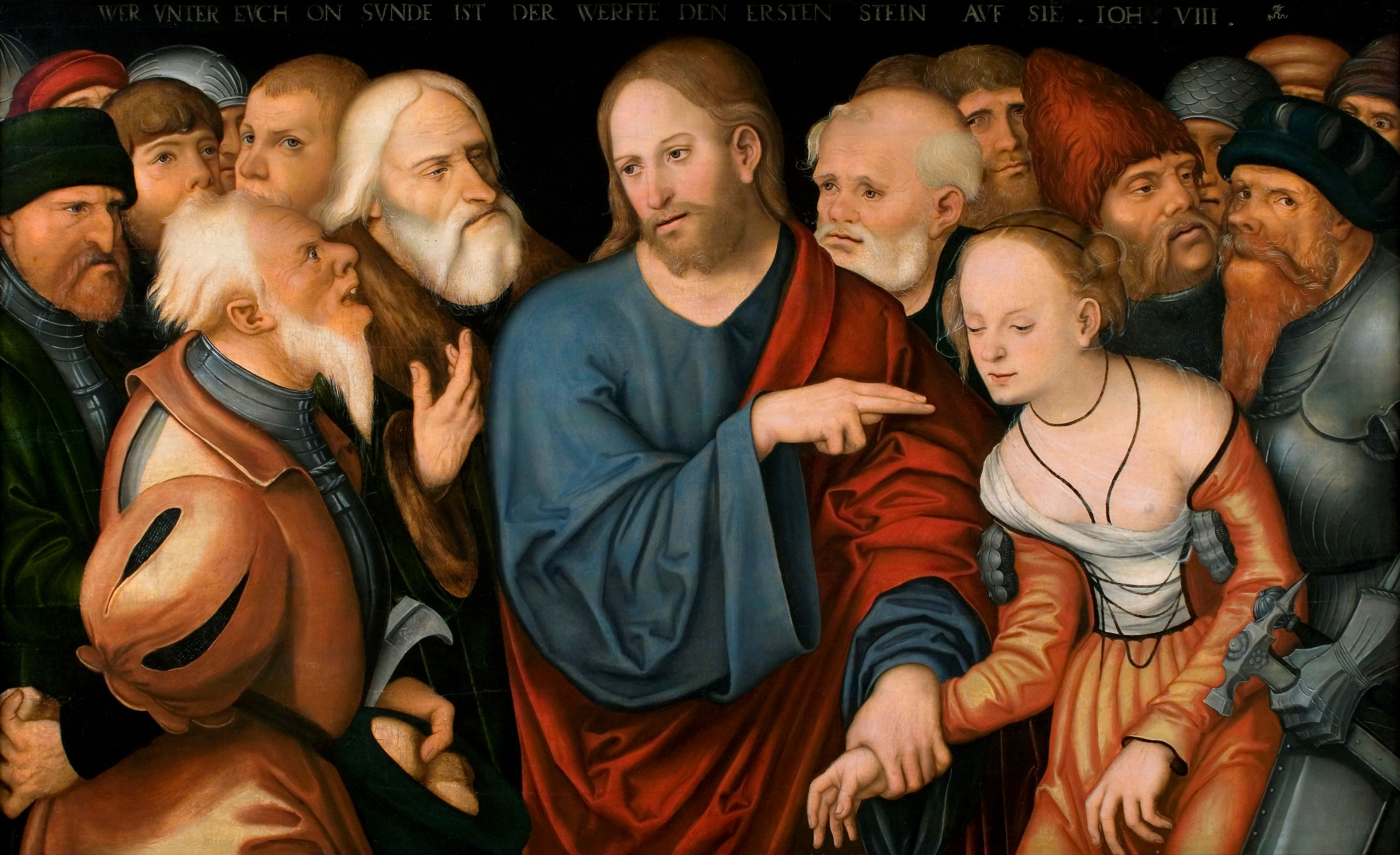
Christ and the Woman Taken in Adultery (Cranach)

The Chrysler Museum provides guided tours, lectures, films, concerts, family days, story time in the galleries, travel programs, and publications. More than 60,000 students from Hampton Roads' schools tour the museum each year. Their visits are facilitated by a team of around 100 volunteer docents, who also offer a variety of general and special tours for the public. The Chrysler docent training program is a selective, rigorous, year-long course. Established docents continue their training through a variety continuing education activities.

The Chrysler displays its permanent collection and several changing exhibitions including works from around the globe. Recent offerings include Rembrandt's Etchings: The Embrace and Darkness of Light, From Goya to Sorolla: Masterpieces from The Hispanic Society of America, To Conserve a Legacy: American Art from Historically Black Colleges and Universities, Rodin: Sculpture from the Iris and B. Gerald Cantor Collection and American Chronicles: The Art of Norman Rockwell.

In May 2024, in light of Jewish American history month the museum did an exhibition on Jewish art from the 16th century to contemporary art.

== The Chrysler Museum Campus ==
=== Perry Glass Studio ===
In 2011, The Chrysler Museum opened the Perry Glass Studio adjacent to the main Museum building. Originally built to complement the more than 10,000 object glass collection within the Museum, the original 7,000 square foot space offered daily glassmaking demonstrations as well as provided glassmaking facilities for visiting artists and students. In 2022, the Museum embarked on an expansion project which tripled the size of the Glass Studio and doubled the number of classes available to both the general public and community partners. In addition to the daily demonstrations, the studio has a robust visiting artist series to invite glass artists from around the world to work in the studio, meet with college students, and demonstrate their artwork to the public. There is also a robust assistantship program, designed for emerging artists seeking careers in glass.

=== Goode Works on Paper Center ===
In 2024, the Chrysler Museum opened the Goode Works on Paper Center within the main museum. Works on paper (prints, photographs, drawings etc.) comprise one-third of the museum's collection; however, due to their sensitivity to light are often not on view. This dedicated space contains a state-of-the-art storage facility for the collection as well as a Study Room where visitors can make an appointment to see this area of the collection.

=== Jean Outland Chrysler Library ===
The collection in the Jean Outland Chrysler Library covers the history of world art, with special emphasis on material relevant to the Chrysler's permanent collection. The library subscribes to several hundred art-related journals, has an extensive collection of current and historical auction catalogues, and exchanges publications with 400 art museums around the world.

The library is named in honor of Jean Outland Chrysler, wife of Walter P. Chrysler Jr. The collection is based on the original holdings of the Norfolk Museum of Arts and Sciences library. In 1977, the library of the London art dealer M. Knoedler & Co. was purchased, adding major historical reference volumes, periodicals, and rare annotated sales catalogues. The library also houses the museum's archives, which includes the original copy of Mark Twain's speech he delivered at the Jamestown Tricentennial Exposition of 1907 and a collection of papers from the Moses Myers family.

The Jean Outland Chrysler Library moved to a building on the campus of Old Dominion University in 2014; however, the public can still access the reading room at the Chrysler Museum of Art.

=== Moses Myers House ===
- Moses Myers House
- U.S. National Register of Historic Places
- Virginia Landmarks Register
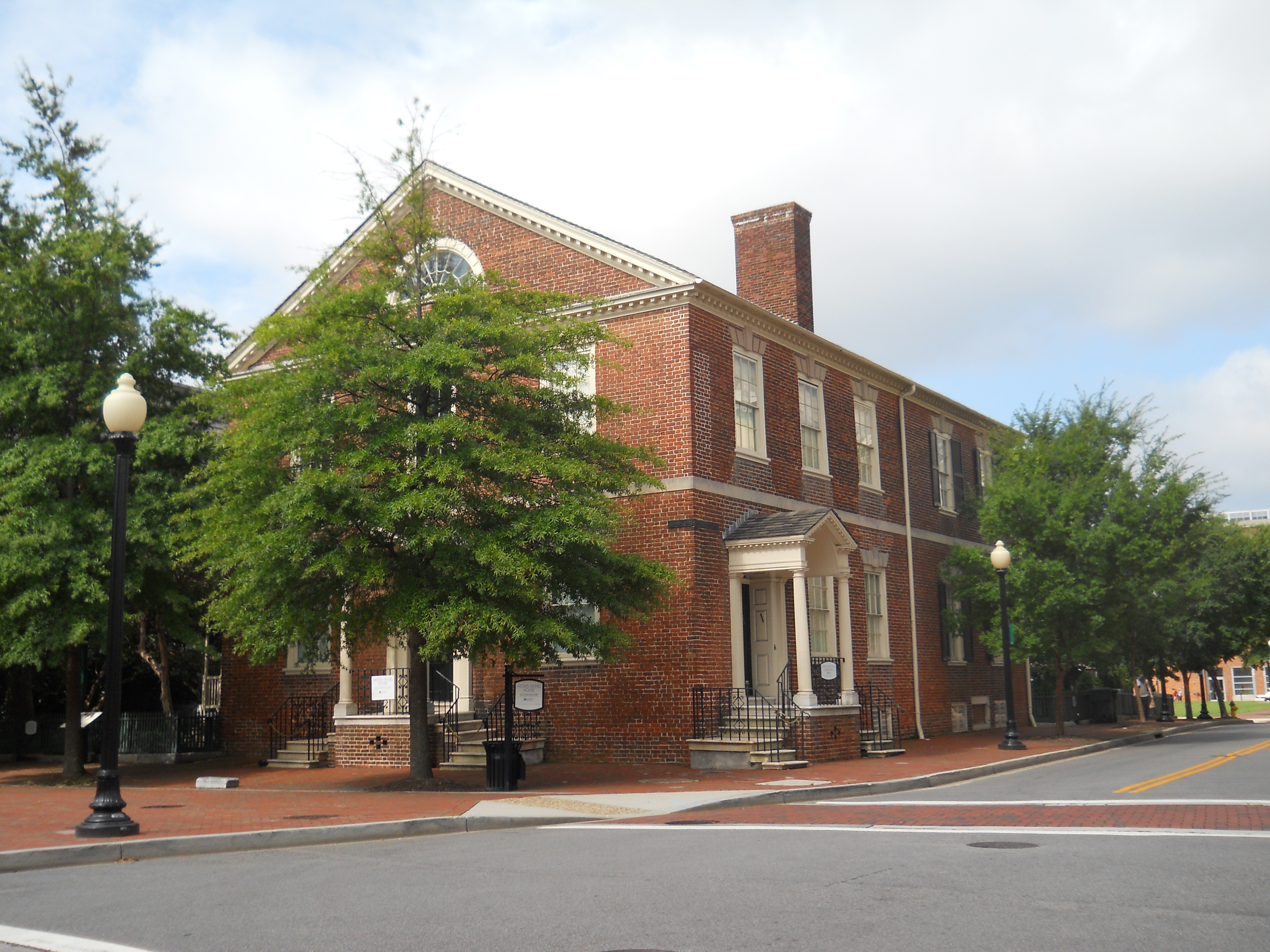
- Moses Myers House
- Interactive fullscreen map
- Location: SW corner of E. Freemason and N. Bank Sts., Norfolk, Virginia
- Coordinates: 36°51′0″N 76°17′17″W
- Area: 9.9 acres (4.0 ha)
- Built: 1792, 1796
- Architects: Latrobe, Benjamin H.
- Architectural style: Federal
- NRHP reference No.: 70000874
- VLR No.: 122-0017

Significant dates
- Added to NRHP: February 16, 1970
- Designated VLR: December 2, 1969

The Moses Myers House in downtown Norfolk is an example of Federal period architecture and retains 70 percent of its original contents. The house and its furnishings allow visitors to experience first-hand the life of a prosperous Jewish merchant and his family during the early 19th century. Moses Myers moved to Norfolk in 1787 with his wife Eliza. Five years later, he purchased a large lot where he erected a home for his family. Today the house contains an important collection of American, English and French furniture, glass, silver, ceramics, and portraits by Gilbert Stuart, Thomas Sully, and John Wesley Jarvis. All were commissioned or acquired by members of the Myers family.

The house was built about 1792 and is a two-story, Federal style brick townhouse. Its facade features a pedimented gable end roof and a small aedicula type portico surrounding the front door. In 1796, a two-story octagonal ended wing attributed to Benjamin H. Latrobe was added to the rear of the house to contain a large dining room. Also on the rear are a two-story service wing and an attached two-story kitchen. A historic renovation of the house occurred in 1906 in anticipation of the Jamestown Exposition. The house was converted to a house museum in 1931.

Beginning in 1960, the house was completely renovated to restore it to a more historical appearance. Victorian additions and modifications were removed, and structural repairs were made to the first floor joists. The interior rooms were remade to return them to a more historically accurate color scheme, and a Ludowici clay tile roof was installed to match the appearance of the building's original wood shingle roof.

It was listed on the National Register of Historic Places in 1970, with an amendment made in 2009.

In October 2022, the council of City of Norfolk, which owns the property, voted to proceed with the possibility of selling it, conjecturing the entirety of the property—the main house, the attached dwelling of the Myers’ enslaved servants, and the historic garden—could be sold as part of a package to developers, perhaps to operate as a bed and breakfast. Multiple entities, including the Norfolk Historical Society, have expressed distress and outrage.

=== Norfolk History Museum at the Willoughby-Baylor House ===
The Chrysler Museum of Art previously oversaw the Norfolk History Museum at the Willoughby-Baylor House (ca. 1794); however the museum no longer manages that property which has been closed since 2020. It illuminated the history of the region by providing thematic offerings and surveys including the decorative arts of Norfolk, stages in Norfolk's story as an international port and maritime center, and the area's naval and military heritage.
