= Jean Outland Chrysler =

American art collector

Jean Esther Outland Chrysler
- Born: Jean Esther Outland; September 15, 1921; Norfolk, Virginia, United States
- Died: January 26, 1982 (aged 60); Norfolk, Virginia, United States
- Education: College of William and Mary
- Spouse: Walter P. Chrysler Jr. (m. 1945)

Jean Esther Outland Chrysler (1921–1982) was an art collector. She is known for donating art to the Muscarelle Museum of Art and the Norfolk Museum of Arts and Sciences which would later become the Chrysler Museum of Art.

Outland was born on September 15, 1921, in Norfolk, Virginia. She attended the College of William and Mary. In 1945, she married Walter P. Chrysler Jr., who had been stationed with the United States Naval Reserve in Norfolk in the 1940s. Walter P. Chrysler Jr. was the son of the automotive executive Walter Chrysler.

The couple settled into an eighteenth-century house in Fauquier County, Virginia. They both were interested in the Visual arts and collected paintings, sculptures, and decorative arts. Chrysler donated a selection of modern paintings to the Muscarelle Museum of Art at the College of William and Mary. Beginning in 1967, the couple loaned parts of their collection to the Norfolk Museum of Arts and Sciences. Ownership was transferred, along with Walter P. Chrysler Jr.'s collection from the Chrysler Art Museum of Provincetown. The Norfolk Museum was renamed the Chrysler Museum of Art.

Chrysler died on January 26, 1982, in Norfolk, Virginia, at the age of 60.

The Jean Outland Chrysler Library was established at the Chrysler Museum of Art. It relocated to the campus of Old Dominion University in 2014. In 2018, the Virginia Capitol Foundation announced that Jenkins' name would be on the Virginia Women's Monument's glass Wall of Honor.
