= Alitalia =

National airline of Italy (1946–2021)

Alitalia - Società Aerea Italiana S.p.A.

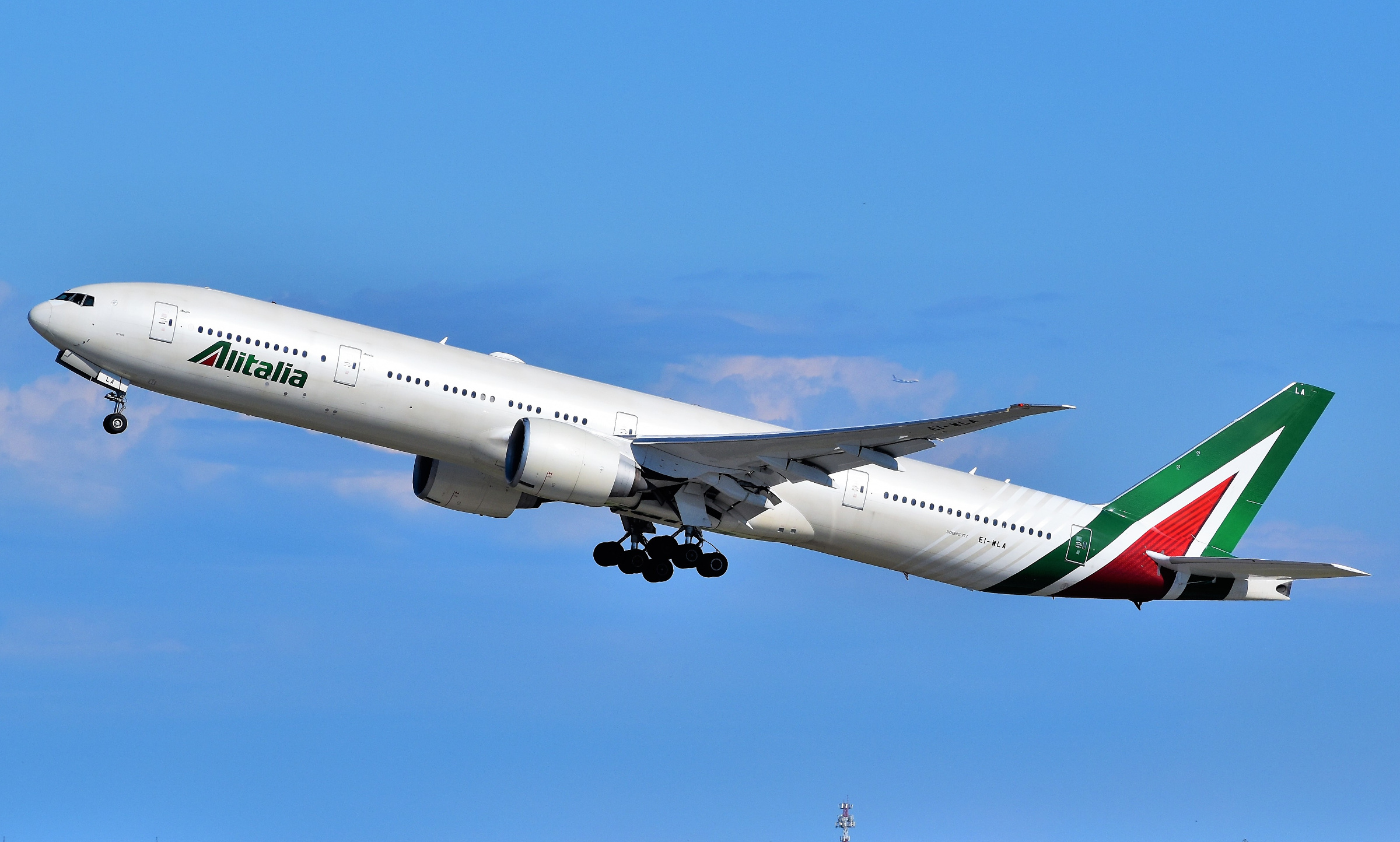
- Alitalia 777-300ER, 2019
IATA	ICAO	Call sign
AZ	AZA	ALITALIA
- Founded: 16 September 1946 (as Alitalia – Linee Aeree Italiane); 12 January 2009 (as Alitalia – Compagnia Aerea Italiana); 1 January 2015 (as Alitalia – Società Aerea Italiana)
- Commenced operations: 5 May 1947
- Ceased operations: 15 October 2021 (sold to, reorganized to, and replaced by ITA Airways)
- AOC #: I-130
- Hubs: Milan–Linate; Milan–Malpensa (1998–2008); Rome–Fiumicino (1946–2021)
- Frequent-flyer program: MilleMiglia
- Alliance: SkyTeam (2001–2021)
- Subsidiaries: Aero Trasporti Italiani (1963–1994); Air One (2009–2014); Alitalia CityLiner (2009–2021); C.A.I. First (1997–2015); C.A.I. Second (1997–2009); Società Aerea Mediterranea (1959–1981); Alitalia Loyalty S.p.A.
- Parent company: Government of Italy (via MEF)
- Headquarters: Fiumicino, Rome, Italy

Alitalia - Società Aerea Italiana S.p.A., operating as Alitalia (Italian pronunciation: [aliˈtaːlja]), was an Italian airline which was once the flag carrier and largest airline of Italy. The company had its head office in Fiumicino, in the Metropolitan City of Rome Capital. The airline was owned by the Government of Italy as a nationalized business from its founding in 1946 until it was privatized in 2009. However, it struggled with profitability whilst operating as a private company, including failed negotiations to sell to other private parties. The airline entered extraordinary administration in 2017 following many years of financial losses. The Italian government eventually took back ownership of the airline in March 2020.

The airline operated a fleet of Airbus A319-100, Airbus A320-200, Airbus A321-100, Airbus A330-200, and Boeing 777-200ER aircraft to over 34 scheduled domestic, European and intercontinental destinations. The airline operated from its main hub at Leonardo da Vinci–Fiumicino Airport in Rome. The airline was a full member of the SkyTeam alliance, and it had codeshare agreements with 42 airlines. In 2018, the airline was the twelfth-largest airline in Europe.

On 24 August 2021, Alitalia announced that it would cease operations on 15 October 2021, and that passengers with tickets for later flights could reschedule on an earlier flight or request a refund.

On 15 October 2021, in a hybrid reorganization, Alitalia sold its entire operation to ITA Airways, a newly formed state-owned flag carrier.

== History ==
=== Alitalia - Linee Aeree Italiane ===
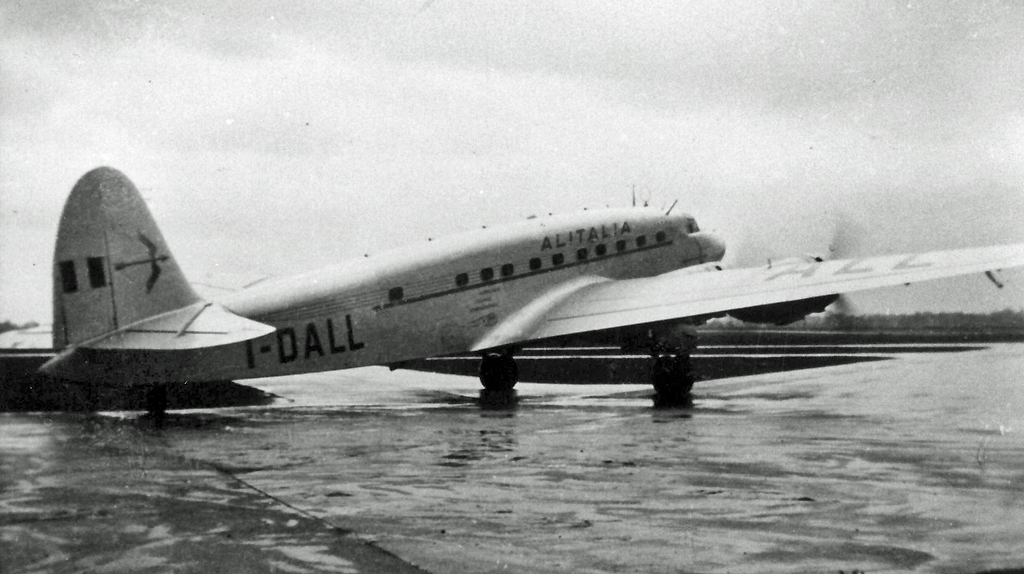
Alitalia Savoia-Marchetti SM.95 at Manchester in 1948

Alitalia - Linee Aeree Italiane S.p.A. was established on 16 September 1946 as Aerolinee Italiane Internazionali (Italian International Airlines). It was formed as a result of an Anglo-Italian agreement and was funded by the Italian government and British European Airways (BEA) in a 60/40 share arrangement with a capital of 900 million lire (£1,000,000). Its popular name, Alitalia, is an Italian portmanteau of the words ali (wings) and Italia (Italy). It started operations on 5 May 1947, in which year it carried over 10,000 passengers. The inaugural flight was with a Fiat G.12 Alcione, piloted by Virginio Reinero from Turin to Catania and Rome.

The first intercontinental flight left a year later, flying between Milan and cities in South America. The Savoia-Marchetti SM.95 four engined airliner was used on European routes up to 1949. On 31 October 1957, Alitalia merged with Linee Aeree Italiane and took on the name of Alitalia – Linee Aeree Italiane. By the time of its liquidation, Alitalia was owned by the Italian Ministry of the Treasury (49%), other shareholders, including employees (49%) and Air France-KLM (2%, later: 25%). The airline's first charter flight was operated on November 1, 1958, from Turin to Nice.

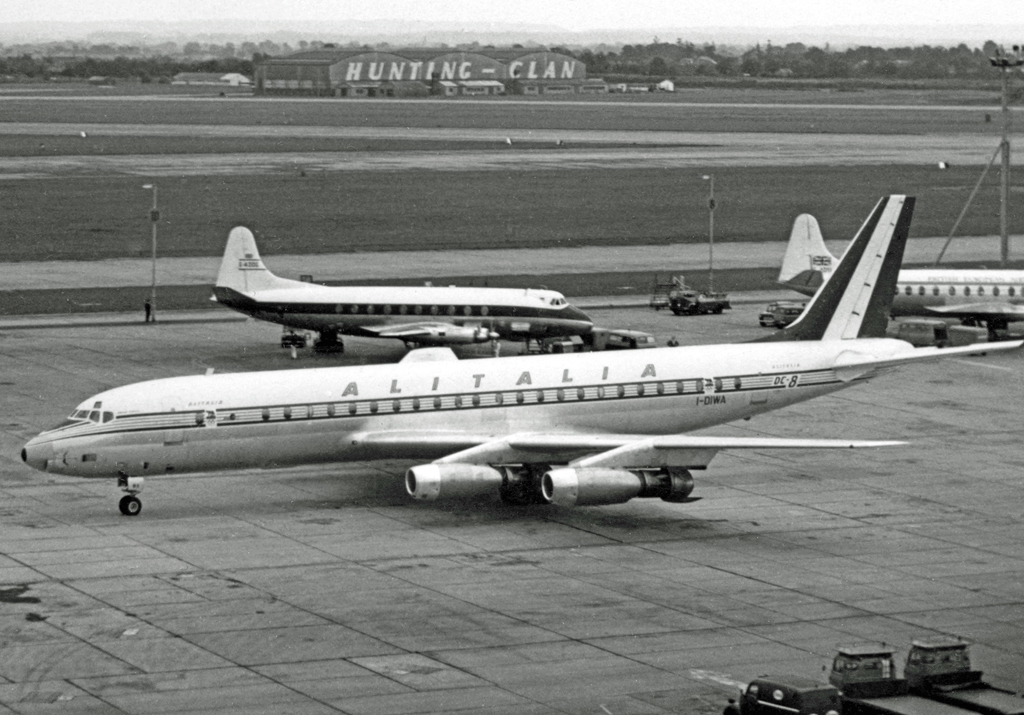
Alitalia Douglas DC-8 at Heathrow Airport in August 1960

By 1960, Alitalia was operating jet airliners on some European routes (the Sud Caravelle) and the Douglas DC-8 on several longer distance routes. The Vickers Viscount propeller-turbine four-engined airliner was flown by Alitalia on its European network throughout the 1960s.

Beginning with Pope Paul VI in 1964 until the airline's closure in 2021, the Pope flew most often on a chartered Alitalia jet when making pastoral and state visits to a country. The Pope's flight was often nicknamed "Shepherd One" by the press, while the actual callsign was "Volo Papale" (papal flight, in Italian) followed by a serial number.

In 1978, Alitalia had its head office in the Palazzo Alitalia in Rome.

=== 1990s ===
By the 1990s, Alitalia was carrying 25 million passengers annually. In 1997, it set up a regional subsidiary Alitalia Express and in 2001 became a member of SkyTeam. In November 2003, Alitalia announced that it would cut 2,700 jobs over the next three years to prepare the airline for a merger with Air France and KLM. In April 2004, Alitalia acquired Gandalf Airlines, a bankrupt regional airline, to gain additional slots at several European airports, mainly in Milan (Linate) and Paris (Charles De Gaulle).

In 1995, Alitalia signed a partnership with KLM which aimed at a merger. The aim of the partnership was to develop Malpensa as a hub, along with Amsterdam (which lacked enough landing slots to expand further) and Rome Fiumicino.

=== 2000s ===
In 2001, Alitalia renewed the ground handling contract with SEA. In the same year, Alitalia joined the SkyTeam alliance.

In September 2007, Alitalia announced that it would nearly halve its hub at Malpensa and instead focus on Rome-Fiumicino and move all intercontinental flights there. Until this announcement, Malpensa had been Alitalia's primary hub for intercontinental flights. The transition away from Malpensa and towards Rome-Fiumicino was completed by the end of March 2008. Minor intercontinental destinations, which previously received flights only from Malpensa, henceforth received only flights from Rome-Fiumicino or else were discontinued.

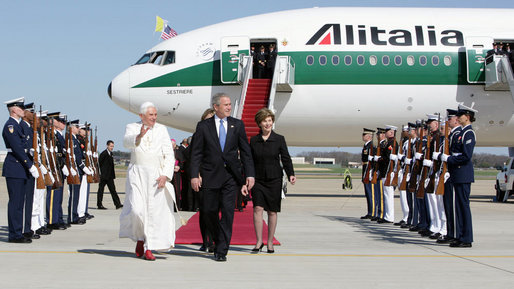
President George W. Bush walks the red carpet with Pope Benedict XVI. (2008)

==== Alitalia - Compagnia Aerea Italiana ====
In 2008, a group of investors formed the "Compagnia Aerea Italiana" (CAI) consortium to buy the bankrupt Alitalia – Linee Aeree Italiane ("old" Alitalia) and to merge these with Air One, another bankrupt Italian carrier.

On 30 October 2008, CAI offered €1 billion to acquire parts of the bankrupt airline, amidst pilots' and flight crew members' opposition to labour agreements. On 19 November 2008, CAI's offer was accepted by the bankruptcy administrator of Alitalia with the permission of the Italian government, at the time the majority shareholder of the bankrupt airline. Alitalia's profitable assets were transferred to CAI on 12 December 2008 after CAI paid €1.05 billion, consisting of €427 million in cash and the assumption of responsibility for €625 million in Alitalia debt.

A USA diplomatic cable disclosed in 2011 summarised the operation as follows: "Under the guise of a rather quaint (and distinctly un-EU) desire to maintain the Italian-ness of the company, a group of wealthy Berlusconi cronies was enticed into taking over the healthy portions of Alitalia, leaving its debts to the Italian taxpayers. The rules of bankruptcy were changed in the middle of the game to meet the government's needs. Berlusconi pulled this one off, but his involvement probably cost the Italian taxpayers a lot of money."

On 13 January 2009, the "new" Alitalia launched operations. The owners of Compagnia Aerea Italiana sold 25% of the company's shares to Air France-KLM for €322 million. Air France-KLM also obtained an option, subject to certain conditions, to purchase additional shares after 2013.

The "new" Alitalia did not claim the old Alitalia's history as its own, as can be seen in official documents regarding the new "Alitalia Group". Instead, they stressed that they were a totally different company. They chose not to recognize benefits such as discounted tickets to former Alitalia-LAI workers and refused to honour passengers' claims against the old Alitalia.

The new Alitalia did not own many of its operating airplanes. (Alitalia-LAI had owned all of its airplanes.) Almost every plane that CAI had acquired from the old Alitalia was sold or decommissioned. Alitalia-CAI airplanes were leased mostly from Aircraft Purchase Fleet (it), an Irish company owned by Carlo Toto, the former owner of the bankrupt Air One, which was merged in 2008 into Alitalia-LAI when the new company was founded.

=== 2010s ===
In January 2010, Alitalia celebrated its first anniversary since the relaunch. It carried 22 million passengers in its first year of operations. In 2011, 25 million passengers were carried. On 1 February 2010, it was announced that Alitalia crew would go on a four-hour strike over wages. This was the first strike action for Alitalia since the relaunch. On 11 February 2010, Alitalia announced that, starting from March 2010, it would use Air One as a low-fare airline ("Smart Carrier"), with operations based at Milan Malpensa Airport, focused on short-haul leisure routes. It was predicted that the subsidiary would handle 2.4 million passengers by 2012. In 2011, 1.4 million passengers were carried by the subsidiary. Although operations were initially to be concentrated at Milan Malpensa, Air One later operated from Milan-Malpensa, Venice-Marco Polo, Pisa and Catania as of January 2013.

On 12 February 2011, information was released about a possible merger between Alitalia and Meridiana Fly, another Italian carrier. The merger did not occur. On 23 February 2011, Alitalia and ENAC announced the introduction of a safety card written in braille and characters in 3-D relief, which is the first of its kind. On 25 January 2012, Alitalia signed memoranda of understanding with two other Italian airlines, Blue Panorama and Wind Jet, and said to have started processes "aimed at achieving integration" with them. By the end of July 2012, the Italian antitrust authority allowed Alitalia to acquire Wind Jet, but in return Alitalia would have to cede slots on domestic routes. Faced with this, Alitalia cancelled the plans a few days later in August 2012.

On 3 May 2013, in a sting codenamed "Operation Clean Holds", police made 49 arrests at Rome's Fiumicino airport, with another 37 in Italian airports including Bari, Bologna, Milan Linate, Naples, Palermo and Verona. All were Alitalia employees caught on camera, and most were charged with aggravated theft and damage. In late 2013, facing bankruptcy, the loss of a major fuel supplier, and a possible grounding by Italy's civil aviation authority, the airline announced a €500 million rescue package which included a €75 million investment by the Italian state-owned postal operator.

==== Alitalia - Società Aerea Italiana ====
In June 2014, the Abu Dhabi-based UAE national airline Etihad Airways announced it was taking a 49% stake in Alitalia. On 30 September 2014, Alitalia's budget subsidiary Air One ceased flight operations.

On 1 January 2015, Alitalia-CAI formally passed its operations to Alitalia-SAI, a new entity owned 49% by Abu Dhabi-based Etihad Airways and 51% owned by the former Italian stakeholders of Alitalia-CAI. In May 2015, Alitalia announced it would terminate its partnership with Air France-KLM in 2017, stating that there were no longer enough advantages from the joint venture to keep it up.

In February 2016, Alitalia announced that in late March 2016 it would cancel most of its routes from Pisa, including Moscow, Prague, Berlin, Catania and Tirana. Alitalia decided to continue flying to Olbia and Rome.

On 25 April 2017, after Alitalia employees rejected job-cuts proposal aimed at reducing costs, the airline announced that it would start going through a bankruptcy process, beginning with the appointment of an administrator. The Italian government permitted Alitalia to file for bankruptcy on 2 May 2017. On 17 May 2017, after the government had ruled out nationalizing the airline, it was officially put up for sale to be auctioned off. In June, EasyJet expressed interest in purchasing the airline. Ryanair also expressed interest but dropped its bid after the chaos caused by Ryanair's flight cancellations.

In 2018, Delta Air Lines, EasyJet and Italian railway company Ferrovie dello Stato Italiane lodged formal expressions of interest to acquire Alitalia; talks between the parties were opened in February 2019. In March 2019, EasyJet announced that it had withdrawn from the discussions. After the official visit of Chinese leader Xi Jinping to Rome, China Eastern Airlines expressed interest in Alitalia's rescue plan and could spend up to €100 million in exchange for a 10% stake. Delta Air Lines stated to Reuters that it was ready to invest in Alitalia but that a 10% stake was the right way for them to do so.

=== 2020s ===
On 17 March 2020, the Italian government took full control over the airline after talks with a number of Italian and international companies failed to agree with terms of them being shareholders of the airline.

In April 2020, the Italian government announced it would take over Alitalia in May since it would not be able to survive the impact of the COVID-19 pandemic on its own. The fleet was planned to be reduced from 113 aircraft to "more than 90". The airline also questioned if it should remain in SkyTeam, which it has been a member of since 2001.

In May 2020, USAerospace Partners (headed by Michele Roosevelt Edwards) announced they were still interested in purchasing the airline. The company had offered to purchase it earlier in the year. Edwards stated the airline would fly 150 planes within 5 years, with a mix of Airbus, Boeing, and Embraer.

On 21 May 2020, Alitalia left the SkyTeam Transatlantic Joint Ventures.

On 29 June 2020, Italian Prime Minister Giuseppe Conte announced that Francesco Caio would be named Chairman and Fabio Lazzerini would be named CEO of the new Alitalia.

On 24 August 2021, Alitalia announced it would be ending all ticket sales on their website and announced customers who purchased tickets for flights after 15 October 2021 will be refunded.

==== ITA Airways ====
On 10 October 2020, the Italian government signed a decree to allow the reorganization of the airline as ITA - Italia Trasporto Aereo S.p.A. On 28 October 2020, it was reported that ITA would buy several assets from Alitalia - Società Aerea Italiana S.p.A., including the brand and the flight codes of Alitalia and Alitalia CityLiner, the International Air Transport Association ticketing code (055), the MilleMiglia frequent-flyer program, and airport slots at London Heathrow (68 weekly slots in summer and 65 in winter). The transaction was expected to cost €220 million.

On 8 January 2021, the European Commission sent a letter to the Italian Permanent Representative to the European Union to launch an "open, transparent, non-discriminatory and unconditional tender" to shed Alitalia assets. The letter consisted of 62 requests for clarification, rejecting the idea that the old carrier could sell its belongings to the new company in private negotiation. In the letter, it was stated that the Alitalia brand should not be retained by ITA, since it is an emblematic indicator of continuity (but finally ITA Airways bought the Alitalia brand for 90 million euros, on October 14, 2021). The European Commission suggested that the combined aviation, ground handling, and maintenance businesses should be sold separately to a third party. It also suggested that the slots must be sold, and the MilleMiglia program in its entirety could be transferred to the new corporate entity.

The new airline commenced operations on 15 October 2021.

== Corporate affairs ==
=== Company status and structure ===
Alitalia's continued loss-making over several years had led to various changes of ownership and status. As of August 2019, the company (Alitalia – Società Aerea Italiana S.p.A.) and its subsidiary Cityliner (Alitalia Cityliner S.p.A.) were in Extraordinary Administration (EA), by virtue of decrees of the Ministry of Economic Development on 2 May and 12 May 2017 respectively, and were declared insolvent on 11 May and 26 May 2017 respectively. Luigi Gubitosi, Prof. Enrico Laghi and Prof. Stefano Paleari were appointed as Extraordinary Commissioners of the Companies in EA.

In terms of ownership, the recent shareholders appeared to be Ferrovie dello Stato Italiane (the Italian state railway company) with 35%, the Italian Ministry of Economy maintaining a further 15% and Delta Air Lines providing technical expertise with a minority 10% stake. The now-majority stakeholder Ferrovie dello Stato was reported to be seeking investor(s) to provide a 40% stake.

From 2020, Alitalia and its subsidiaries were owned by the Italian government.

=== Business trends ===
Although declared bankrupt, the airline continues to trade, albeit unprofitably. The recent key trends of the airline as Alitalia - Società Aerea Italiana S.p.A., including Alitalia CityLiner, that commenced trading on 1 January 2015, are (as of year ending 31 December):

	2015	2016	2017	2018
Turnover (€ m)	3,312	2,880	2,915	3,071
Net profit/loss (EBIT) (€ m)	-199	-360	-496	-343
Number of employees (FTE)(at year end)	×	×	10,871	10,711
Number of passengers (m)	22.1	22.6	21.3	21.8
Passenger load factor (%)	76.2	78.7	78.7	80.0
Number of aircraft (group)(at year end)	141	×	121	×
Notes/sources				

Historical business and operating results for Alitalia's performance before the 2015 reorganisation, where available, were:

Year	Operating profit (€ millions)					Load Factor (%)					On-time (%)				
Year	Q1	Q2	Q3	Q4	Total	Q1	Q2	Q3	Q4	Average	Q1	Q2	Q3	Q4	Average
2009	-210	-63	15	-15	-273	51	65	74	70	65	72	72	ND	ND	72
2010	-125	-4	56	-34	-107	65	71	76	72	71	82	83	ND	ND	80
2011	-86	17	90	-27	-6	64	72	78	77	73	91	85	86	80	86
2012	-109	-60	50	0	-119	69	73	78	80	75	88	90	84	86	87
2013	-136	ND	36	ND	-50	71	ND	79	ND	75	88	ND	86	ND	87
2014	ND	×	×	×	ND	72	×	×	×	72	ND	×	×	×	ND

ND = No Data

=== Head office ===
Alitalia's head office was located in Building Alfa at Via Alberto Nassetti in Fiumicino, Province of Rome. The corporate headquarters was designed by AMDL, a Milan-based architecture firm. The head office was previously in a building at Piazza Almerico da Schio, also in Fiumicino.

=== Branding ===
Alitalia adopted a new logo in 2005. It was designed by Saatchi & Saatchi. This version was updated again in 2015.

Alitalia branding was iconic with Italians as the airline adopted the colors of the flag of Italy (green, white, and red). The name Alitalia is an Italian portmanteau of the words ali ('wings') and Italia ('Italy').

The iconic livery, designed based on its logo, had the letter A painted on the tailfin of the aircraft, with a hockey stick-style livery design on the body. It was introduced in 1969. Starting with the joint venture with Etihad Airways, the airline redesigned its livery with a warm ivory fuselage design with only the Alitalia A wrapped around the tail and the tail section of the airplane. The final branding and livery design was created by Landor.

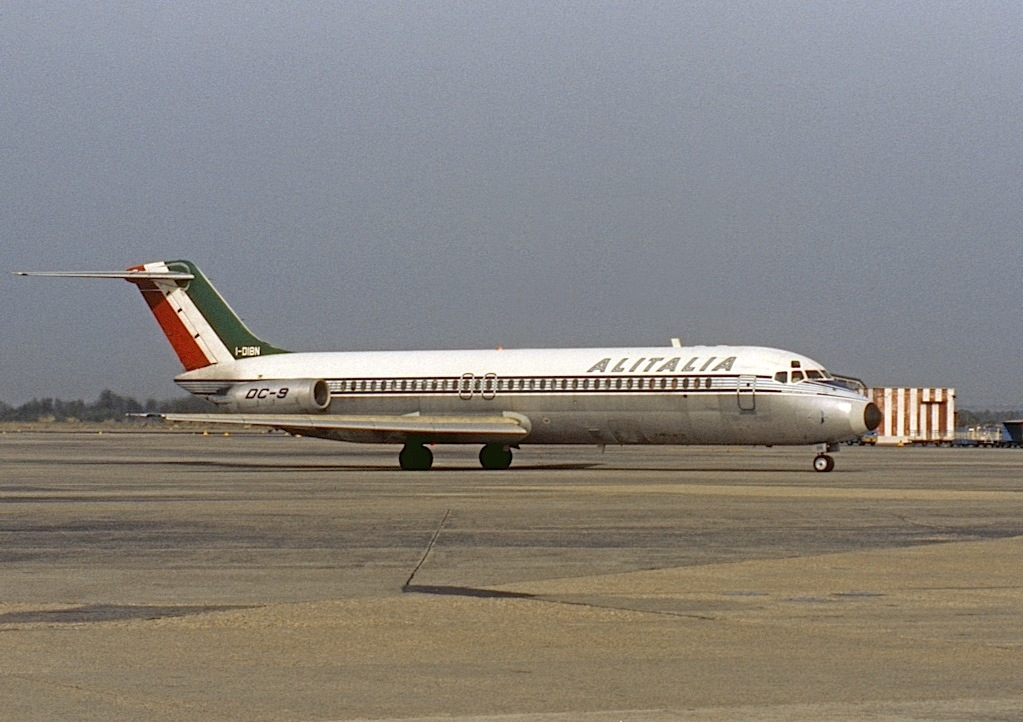
Alitalia McDonnell Douglas DC-9 in the 1957 livery

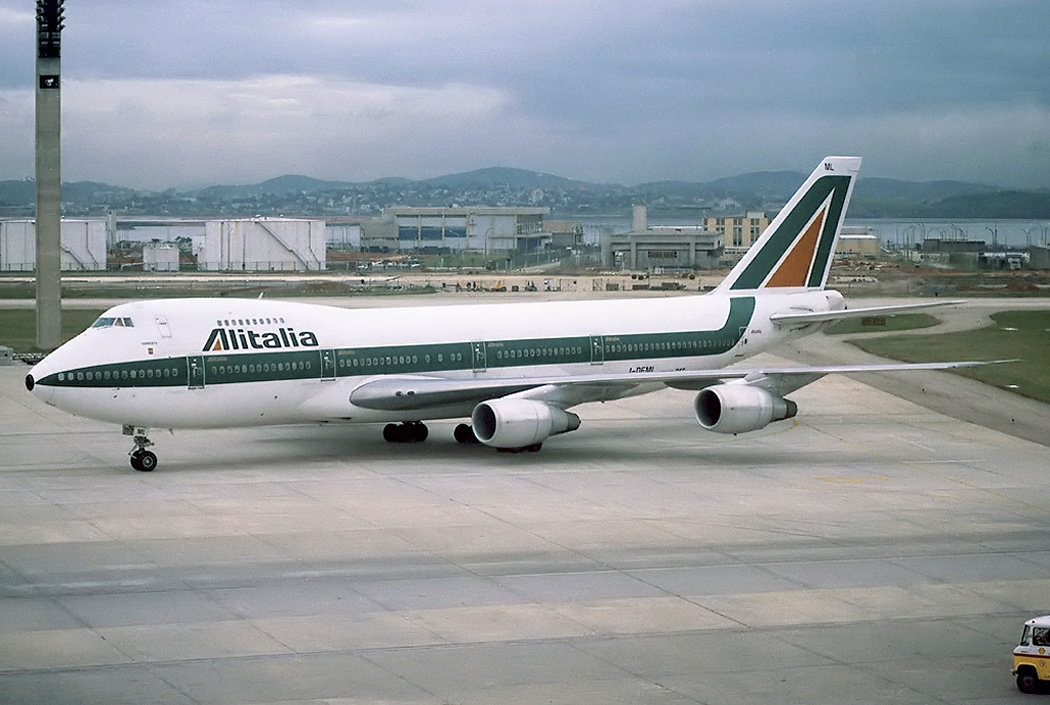
Alitalia Boeing 747 in the 1969 livery

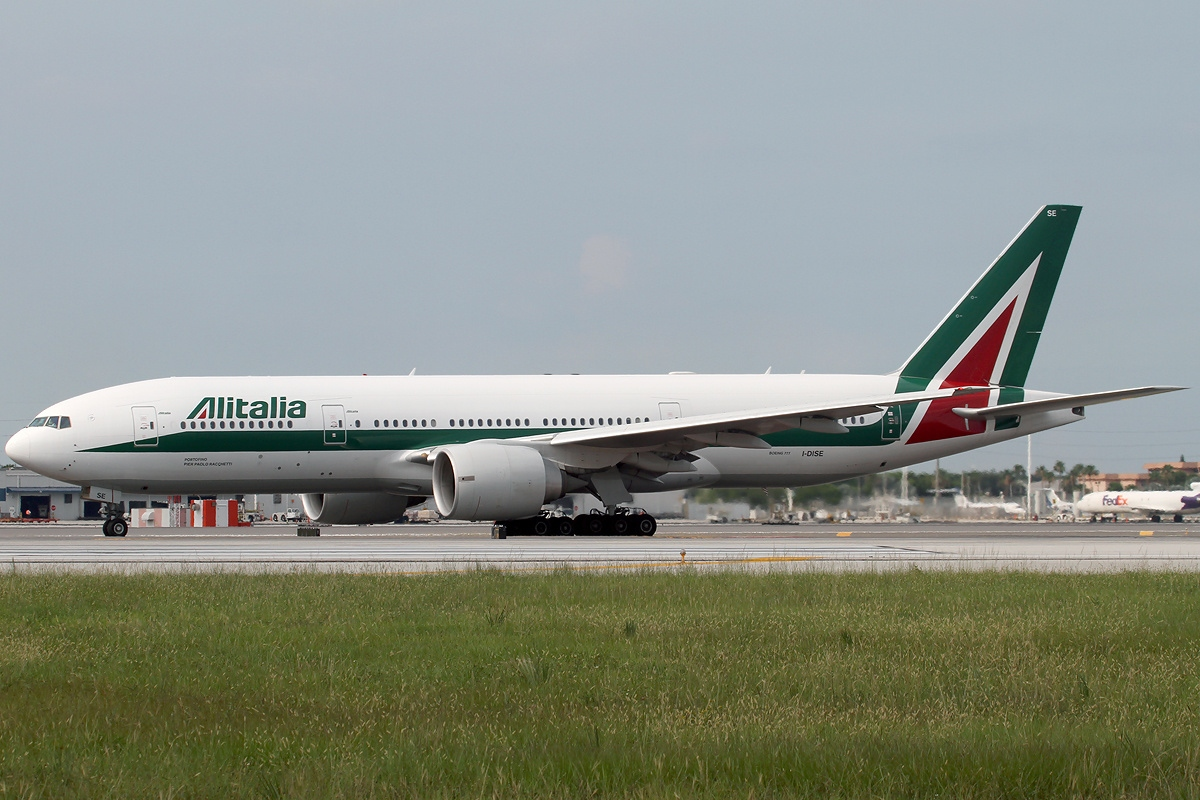
Alitalia Boeing 777 in the 2005 livery

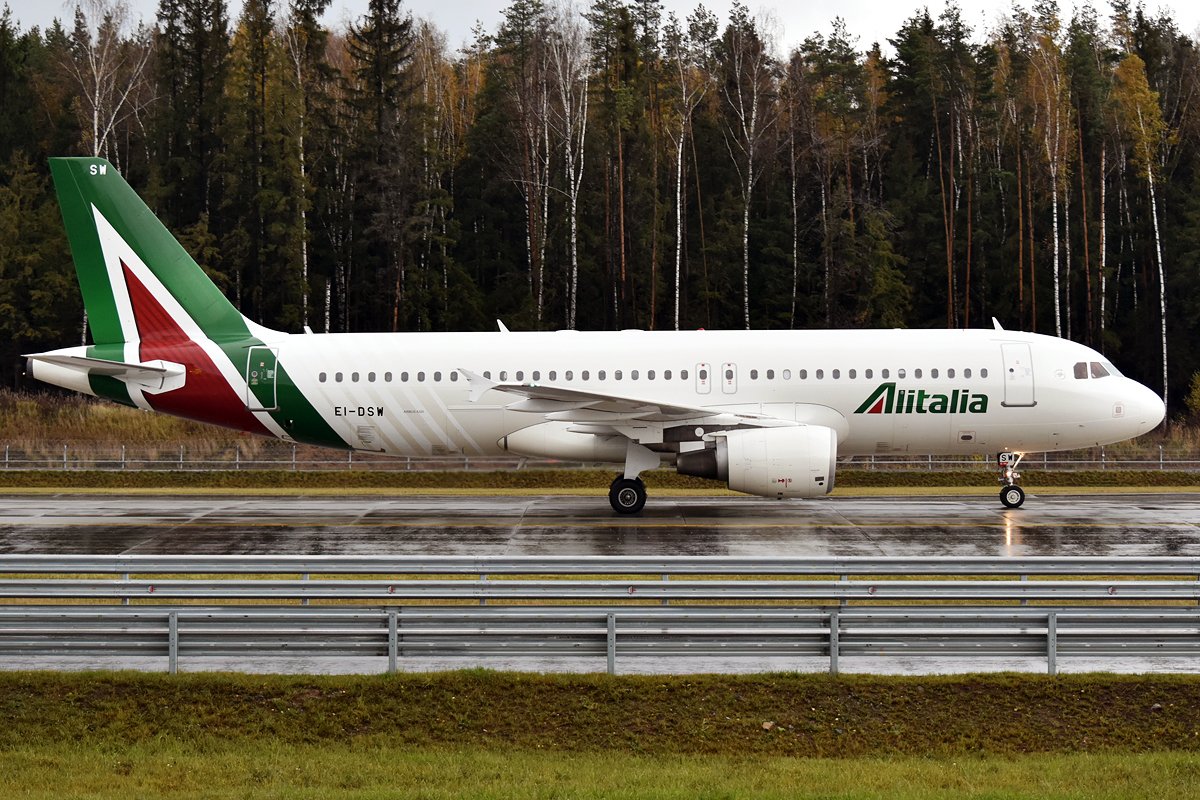
Alitalia Airbus A320 in the final livery design

=== Advertising ===
A variety of different slogans have been used by Alitalia:

- "Alitalia vola con te" (Alitalia flies with you)
- "Fatti per volare alto" (Made to fly high)
- "Alitalia, al lavoro per te" (Alitalia, working for you)
- "Muoviamo chi muove l'Italia" (We move those who move Italy)
- "Scegli come volare" (Choose how to fly)
- "The pleasure of flying Made in Italy"

In 2014, the company adopted a new slogan

- "Where the journey meets the destination." (International advertisement)

Alitalia's branding was also beloved by fans of the World Rally Championship, famously appearing on the Lancia Stratos that won 15 rallies and three manufacturer's titles.

=== Financial issues ===
==== Alitalia - LAI financial issue ====
Alitalia-Linee Aeree Italiane S.p.A. lost money for years owing to problems with pilots and crew members and labour difficulties, and to government and political interference with attempts to solve them. The Italian government supported Alitalia many times until the European Union set a moratorium on any support before 2011. Alitalia - Linee Aeree Italiane S.p.A. did not survive this moratorium. Alitalia - Linee Aeree Italiane S.p.A. went into liquidation in 2008. The viable parts of Alitalia - Linee Aeree Italiane S.p.A. were bought by the private company Alitalia - Compagnia Aerea Italiana on 12 December 2008, which started operations on 13 January 2009.

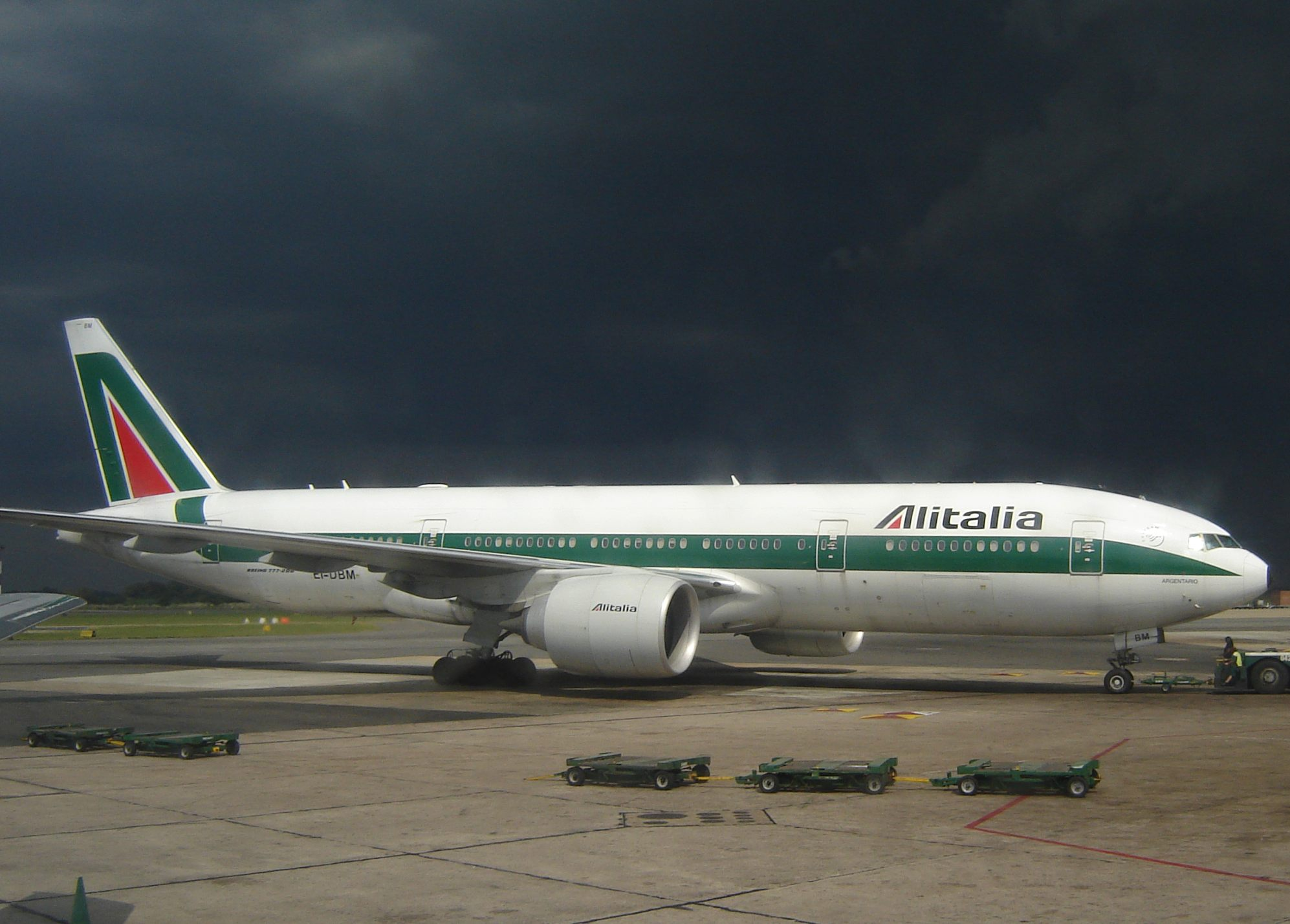
Alitalia Boeing 777-200ER at Ezeiza Airport, Argentina, during a severe thunderstorm. (2006)

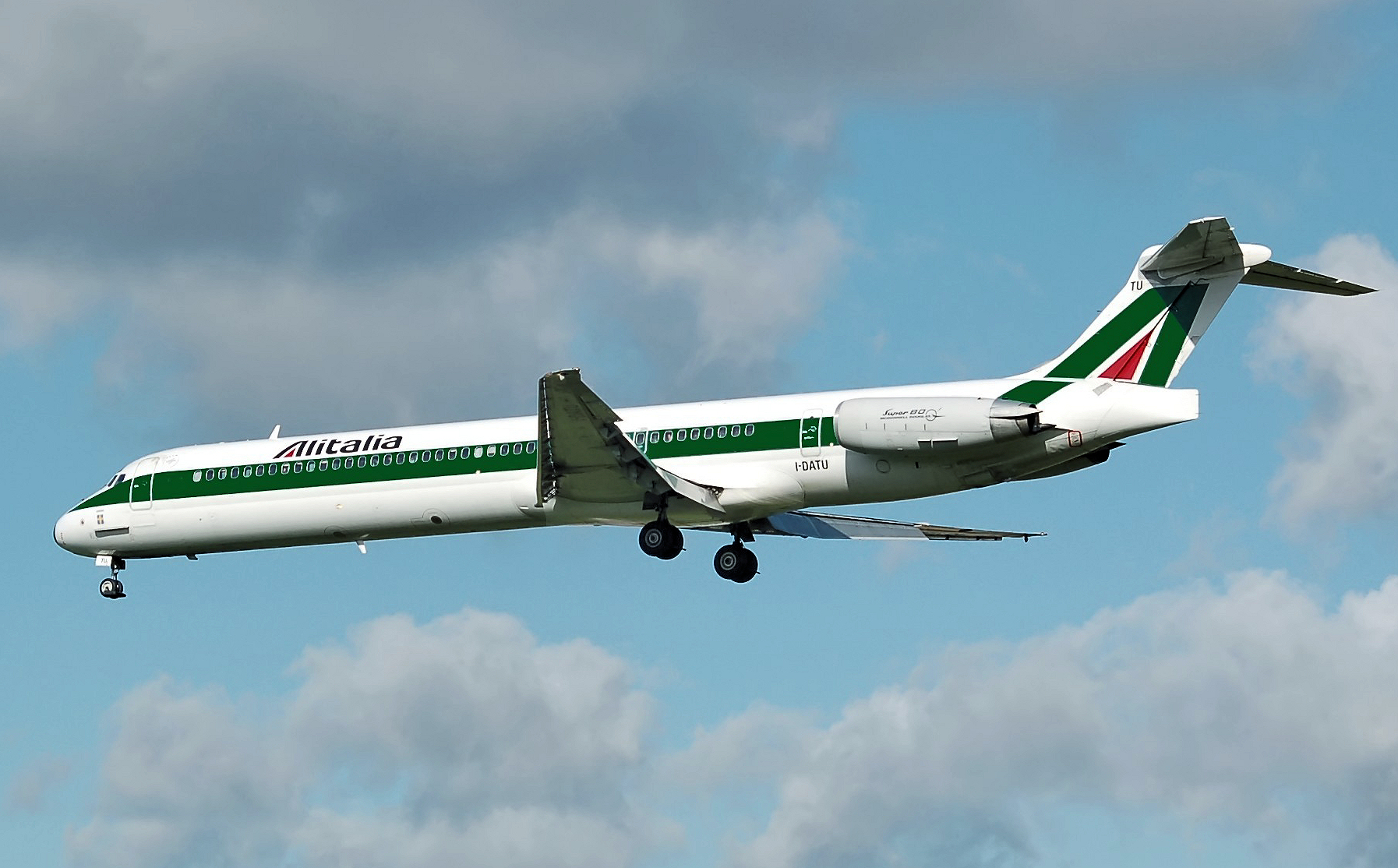
Alitalia McDonnell Douglas MD-82 (2007)

Alitalia has reported only one year of profit (1998) since its foundation in 1946. Alitalia reported net losses of more than €3.7 billion between 1999 and 2008. Previous state aid to Alitalia included some €1.5 billion in 1998 from the government of premier Romano Prodi. In 2002, Alitalia received a capital increase of €1.432 billion under the government of Silvio Berlusconi. In 2004, the Berlusconi government gave a €400mn 'bridge' loan to Alitalia. In 2005, the capital of Alitalia was increased by €1.6 billion, including an over €500mn bond float issued with the promise of a return to profit in 2006. (Unfortunately the year ended with a loss of €626 million). In 2008, the Italian government gave a bridging loan of €300mn to Alitalia.

The government could in 2006 no longer offer support to the failing airline since it had been forbidden by the European Union to inject new capital. Therefore, as all other attempts to save the company had failed, the Italian government announced its willingness to lead Alitalia towards privatization by lowering its part of ownership in it. Several failed attempts to take over or merge Alitalia were made.

In May 2008, the government issued a decree that would exempt Alitalia from disclosing information on this sale to the market. As a consequence the trade in Alitalia stock at the Borsa Italiana in Milan was halted indefinitely by the stock exchange authorities as of 4 June 2008. Intesa Sanpaolo, as requested by the government, devised a plan in co-operation with the Italian cabinet. The plan was that Alitalia would file for bankruptcy, and thus be protected from its creditors. The next step of the plan was to split Alitalia in two parts, one part containing the debts and less promising parts of the company. After negotiations under supervision of the Italian government Alitalia filed for bankruptcy in August 2008.

In September 2008, Pope Benedict XVI revealed that he was offering his prayer for Alitalia after takeover talks broke down.

==== Alitalia - CAI financial issue ====
CAI, Compagnia Aerea Italiana, a consortium of Italian investors, presented a binding offer of €1,100 million to Alitalia's bankruptcy administrator on 30 October 2008 to acquire parts of the airline, pressing ahead despite refusal by some pilots and flight attendants' unions to sign on to the rescue plan. The Italian government and the bankruptcy administrator agreed to the CAI takeover offer on 19 November 2008. The profitable assets of Alitalia - Linee Aeree Italiane S.p.A. were transferred to CAI on 12 December 2008, when CAI paid the offered sum. CAI paid €1.052 billion ($1.33 billion), paying €427 million in cash and taking on €625 million in Alitalia debts. CAI is liable for all Alitalia expenses per 1 December 2008. CAI bought Air One as well.

=== Alitalia Cargo ===
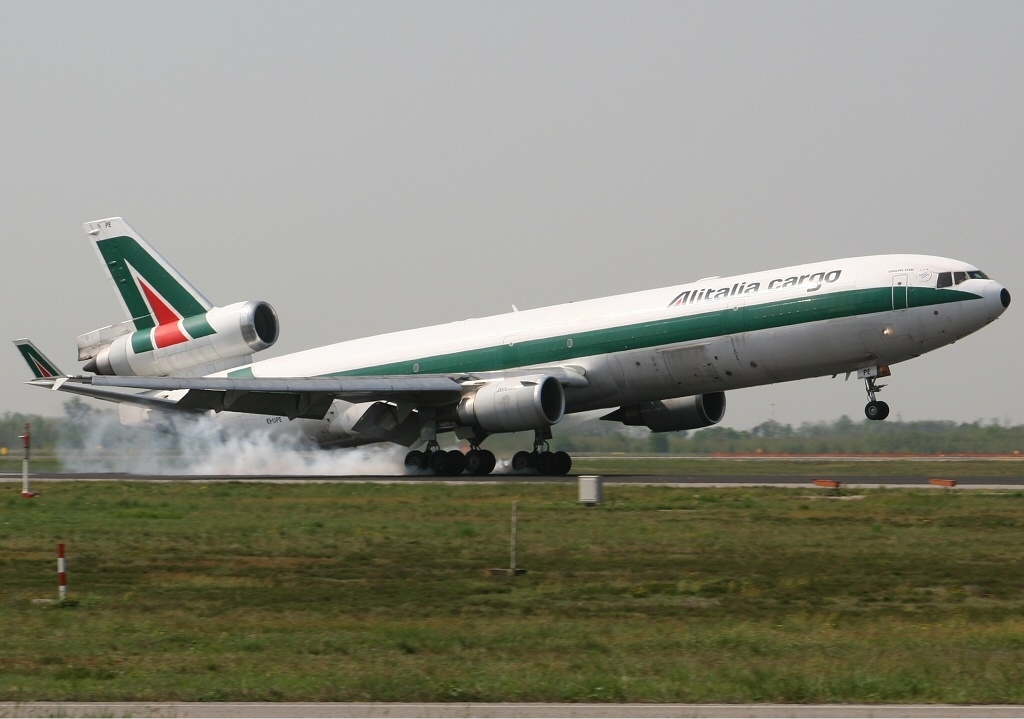
An Alitalia Cargo McDonnell Douglas MD-11 in 2007

Established in 1947, Alitalia Cargo became a member of SkyTeam Cargo in 2001. Destinations concentrated on strategic markets to China, Korea, Japan and the USA. Alitalia Cargo had a fleet of 5 McDonnell Douglas MD-11 freighter aircraft operating from Malpensa International Airport. Due to financial turmoil, Alitalia cargo division was sold off to new owners and ceased operations on 12 January 2009.

=== Controversy ===
==== Volare controversy ====
In December 2005, the bankrupt Volare Group (Volareweb, Air Europe) was put up for sale. Alitalia bid to buy the group (other bidders were Air One and Meridiana/Eurofly). Air One went to court, claiming that Alitalia could not buy Volare Group as it had received state aid in the past. The TAR (Regional Administrative Tribunal) of Lazio tried to block Alitalia's acquisition of Volare Group but abandoned the attempt, claiming that Alitalia had repaid its €400 million loan and so there would be nothing stopping it from buying Volare Group. Air One also went to court, unsuccessfully. Alitalia created Volare SpA to buy the Volare Group. The airlines were becoming closer, and Volare Group had started providing soft maintenance services for some Alitalia aircraft in Milan Malpensa airport. However, the Italian Consiglio di Stato (State Council) on 23 May 2006 once again blocked the acquisition of the airline. It was not clear what was going to happen as Volare was in serious financial difficulties. On 2 November 2006, the TAR court decided that the administrative procedure used by the Italian government to sell Volare to Alitalia was invalid, but the selling contract was still valid because the administrative court had been declared incompetent over this topic. If Air One wanted to obtain Volare, it would have to go to the local civil court and ask it to declare that the selling contract was invalid. Alitalia's offer for 38 million euros was the winning bid. On 15 May 2006, the former Volare Group employees were transferred to Volare SpA (the Alitalia subsidiary).

==== Antitrust issues with Alitalia - LAI ====
In December 2005, Italy's antitrust agency fined Alitalia €30,000 for misleading consumers by advertising a round-trip flight tariff while showing only the price of a one-way ticket. The antitrust agency said in a statement that the advertisement appeared on Alitalia's web site during May and June 2005.

The European Court of Justice has in July 2008 rejected an appeal by Alitalia against the European Commission in a long-running inquiry into Italian state aid. The airline challenged conditions set by the commission in 2001 for the use of state aid in restructuring the company. The court ruling did not impose any new conditions on Alitalia, and the commission considers the case settled. A statement: "the Court of First Instance dismisses Alitalia's action and confirms that the commission's decision of 2001 is valid". The court "confirms the validity of each of the conditions imposed on Alitalia by the commission". These conditions were:

- a requirement that the Italian authorities act as a normal shareholder;
- that cash injections be used only for restructuring Alitalia and not for expanding the business;
- that Alitalia sell its holding in the Hungarian airline Malev;
- and that the state aid take the form of a one-off payment.

== Destinations ==
Alitalia served 97 destinations (as of October 2019). Alitalia's hub was at Rome's Leonardo da Vinci–Fiumicino Airport. Four other Italian airports were focus cities.

=== Alliances ===
Alitalia had been in the SkyTeam alliance since 2009; Alitalia - LAI originally joined in 2001. Alitalia had arranged code-share agreements with SkyTeam members, allowing passengers to fly to numerous destinations (with some or all segments operated by airlines other than Alitalia) using a single Alitalia ticket. In July 2010, Alitalia also joined Air France, KLM and Delta's transatlantic joint venture, meaning that the profits from flights across the Atlantic would be shared between the four airlines. On 21 May 2020, Alitalia left the SkyTeam Transatlantic Joint Venture. The fidelity program of Alitalia, called MilleMiglia, with more than 6,000,000 customers, was not sold to ITA Airways, and will continue functioning independently.

=== Codeshare agreements ===
Alitalia codeshared with the following airlines:

- Aeroflot
- Aerolíneas Argentinas
- Air Corsica
- Air Europa
- Air France
- Air France Hop
- Air Malta
- Air Serbia
- Air Seychelles
- airBaltic
- All Nippon Airways
- Azerbaijan Airlines
- Azul Brazilian Airlines
- Bulgaria Air
- Blue Air
- China Airlines
- China Eastern Airlines
- China Southern Airlines
- Continental Airlines
- Croatia Airlines
- Czech Airlines
- Delta Air Lines
- Etihad Airways
- Gol Transportes Aéreos
- Hainan Airlines
- Kenya Airways
- KLM
- Korean Air
- Kuwait Airways
- Luxair
- Middle East Airlines
- Northwest Airlines
- Pegasus Airlines
- Royal Air Maroc
- Royal Jordanian
- Saudia
- SriLankan Airlines
- TAP Air Portugal
- TAROM
- Uzbekistan Airways
- Vietnam Airlines
- Virgin Australia
- XiamenAir

== Fleet ==
=== Final fleet ===
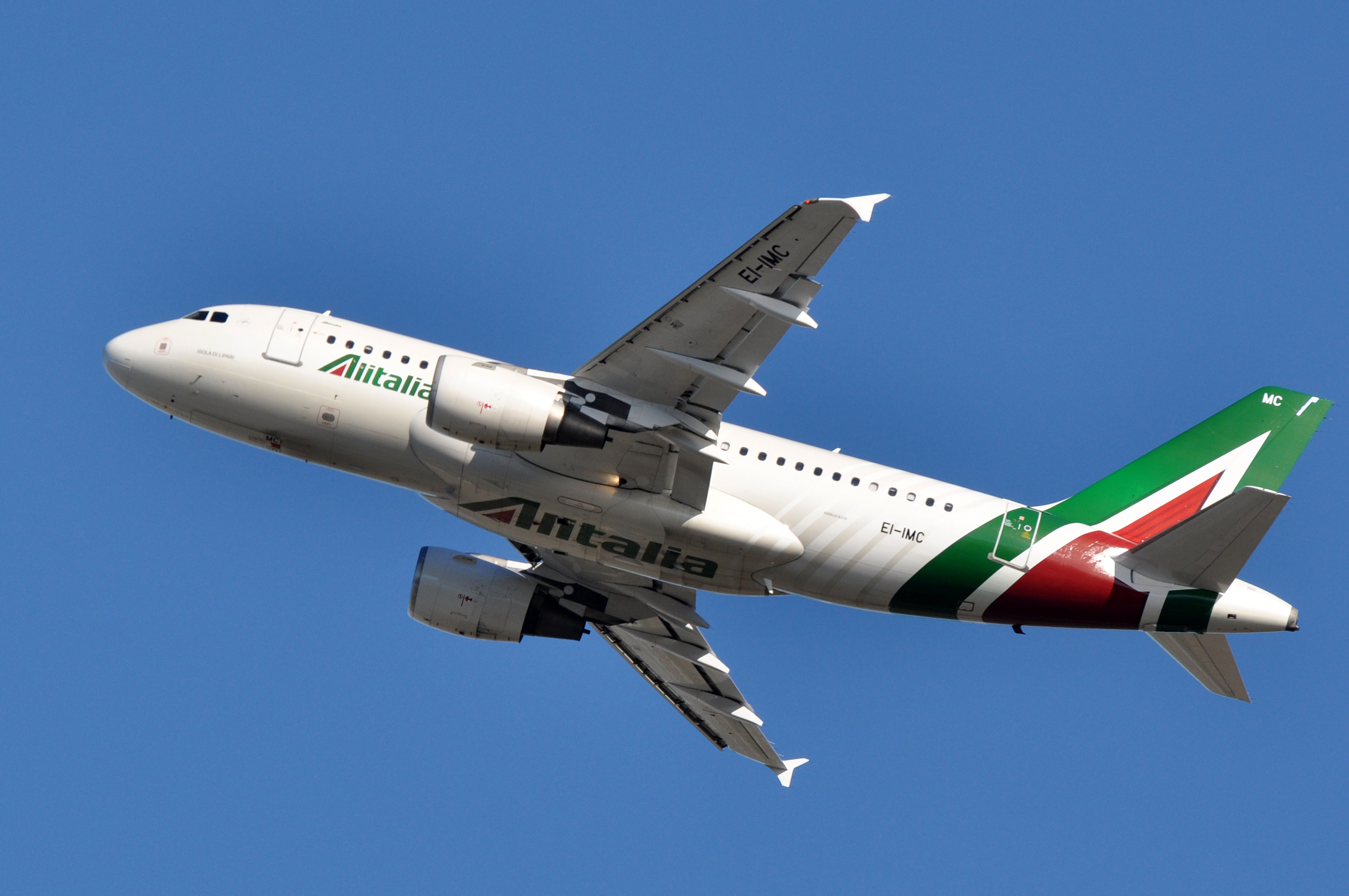
An Alitalia Airbus A319-100

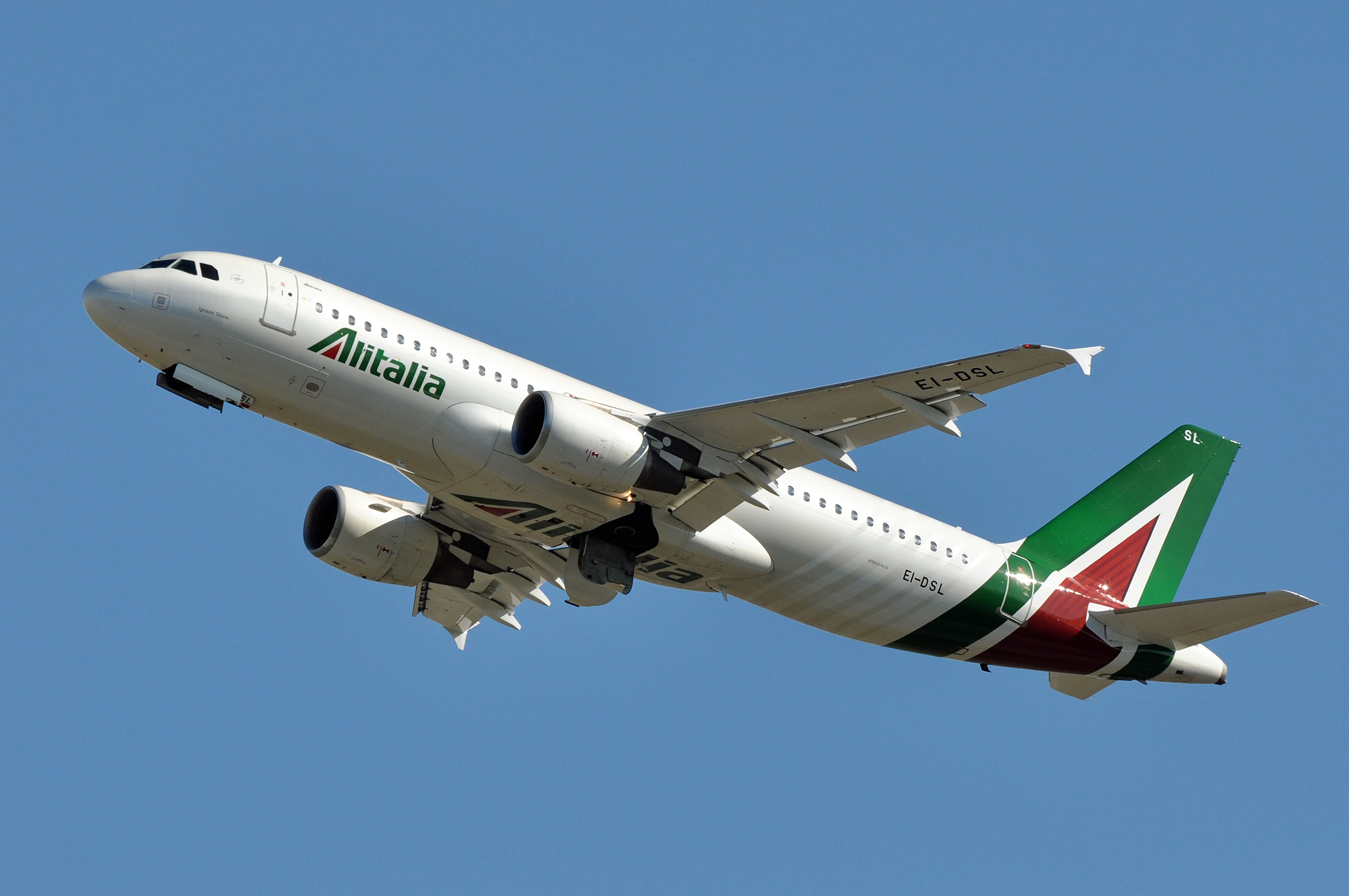
An Alitalia Airbus A320-200

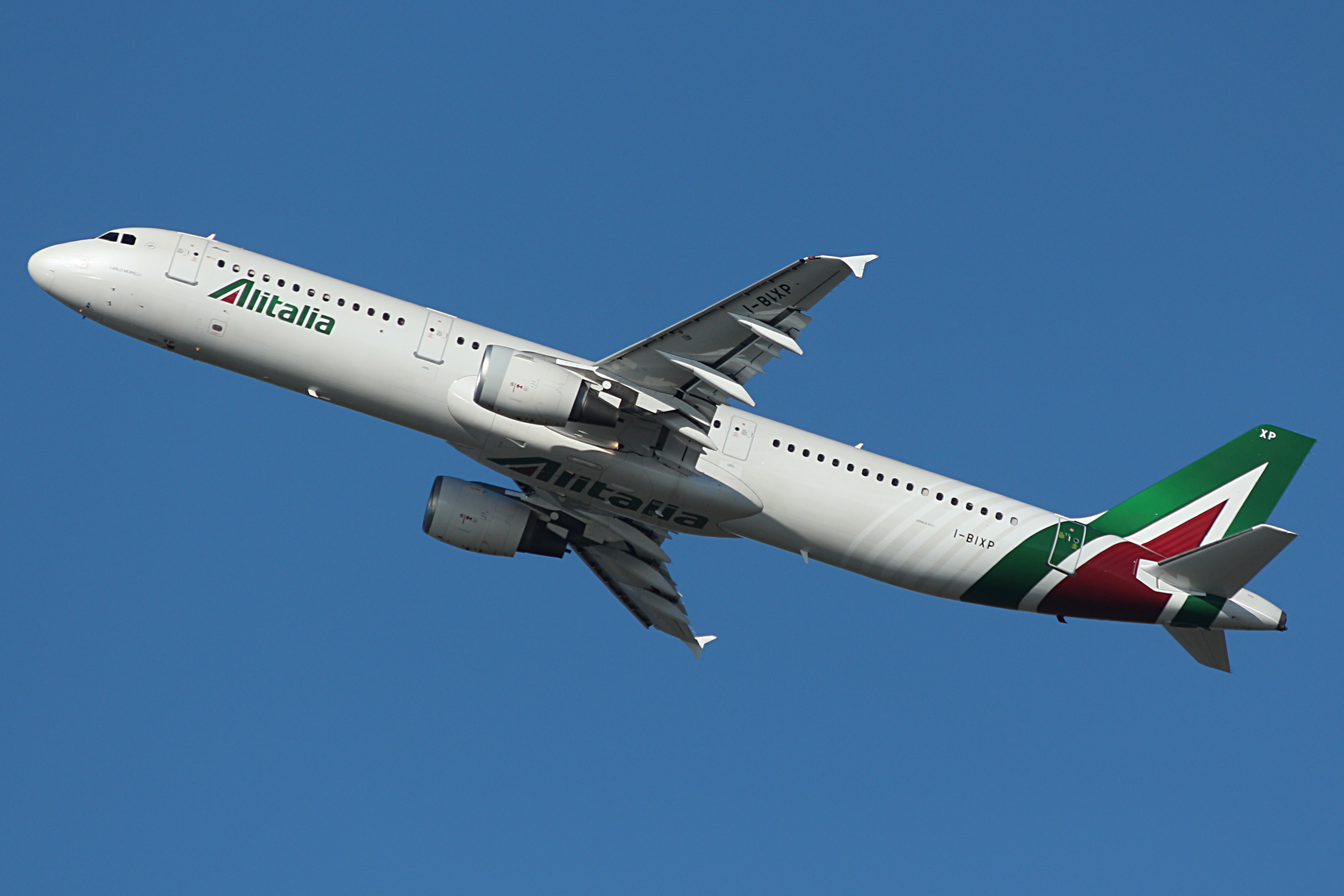
An Alitalia Airbus A321-100

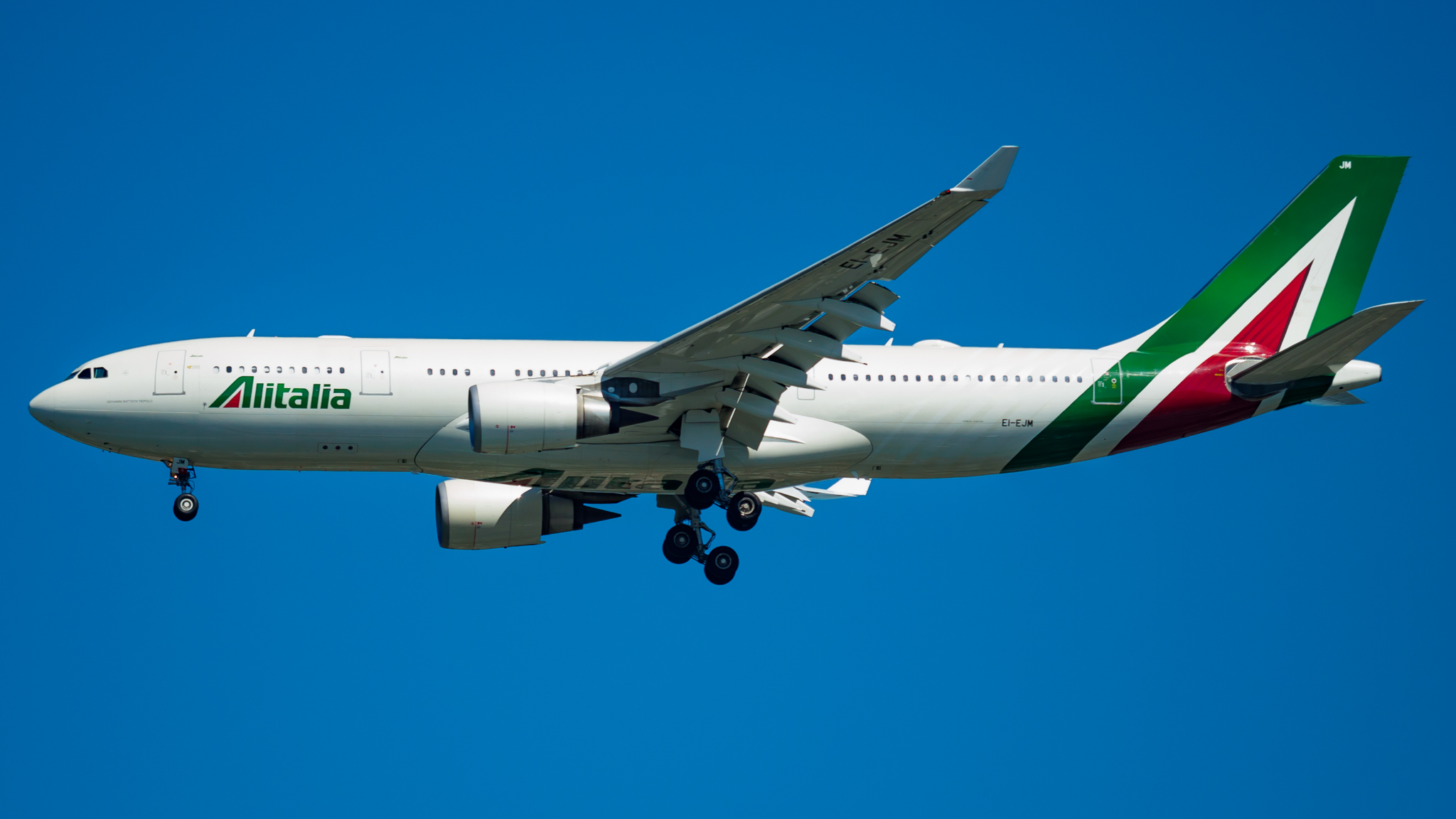
An Alitalia Airbus A330-200

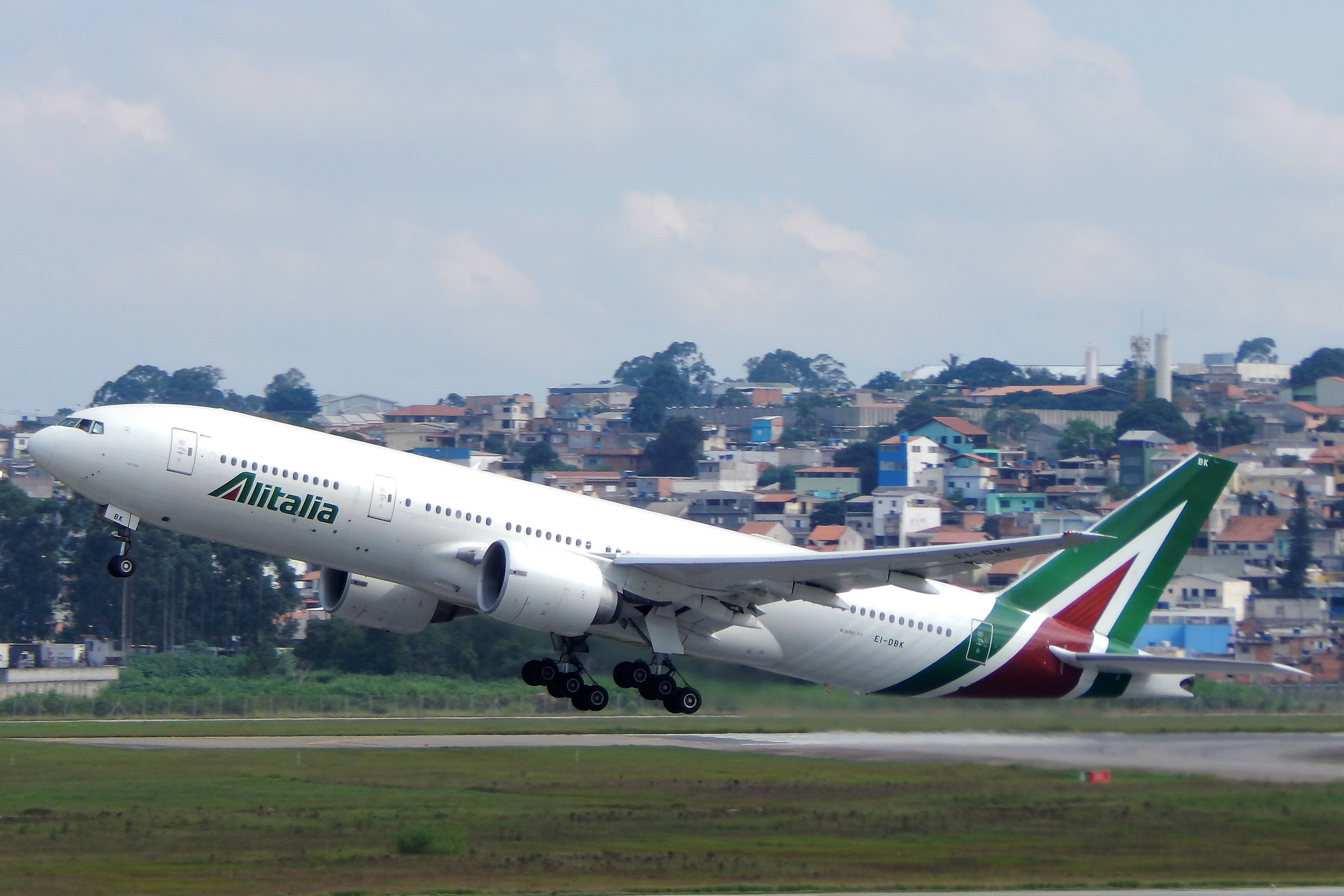
An Alitalia Boeing 777-200ER

Before ceasing operations, the Alitalia fleet consisted of the following aircraft.

Aircraft	In service	Orders	Passengers					Notes
Aircraft	In service	Orders	B	E+	E	Total	Refs	Notes
Airbus A319-100	19	—	—	—	144	144		18 transferred to ITA Airways.
Airbus A320-200	38	—	—	—	171	171		27 transferred to ITA Airways.
Airbus A320-200	38	—	—	—	174	174		27 transferred to ITA Airways.
Airbus A320-200	38	—	—	—	180	180		27 transferred to ITA Airways.
Airbus A321-100	5	—	—	—	200	200		
Airbus A330-200	10	—	20	17	219	256		7 transferred to ITA Airways.
Boeing 777-200ER	6	—	30	24	239	293		EI-DDH in SkyTeam livery. EI-ISD is converted for cargo transport.
Total	78	—						

=== Fleet development ===
Between 2009 and 2011, Alitalia renewed its fleet with 34 new aircraft, while 26 older planes were retired. The renewal process ended in early 2013. These new planes were not owned by Alitalia itself but were leased mostly from Aircraft Purchase Fleet (APF), an Irish leasing company created by former Air One owner Carlo Toto primarily to purchase the new Alitalia fleet. Following the Air One merger, the entire fleet that was not already leased from other lessors, plus the former Air One fleet that was owned by Air One outright, came under the ownership of APF, a subsidiary of Toto's Italian conglomerate Toto Holding. The majority of the fleet was on the Irish registry instead of the Italian registry.

==== 2020 plans ====
During its restructuring in 2020 under Italian government ownership, Alitalia planned to reduce its fleet of 113 aircraft to "more than 90". It planned to acquire the Airbus A320-200 and possibly the Airbus A320neo; for long-haul service, the airline was to buy the Boeing 787 Dreamliner, specifically the 787-8 and 787-9 variants, although Airbus offered the A330neo and A350 XWB. The airline intended to secure list price discounts of at least 50% and up to 70%, and negotiations with the manufacturers were ongoing.

=== Historical fleet ===
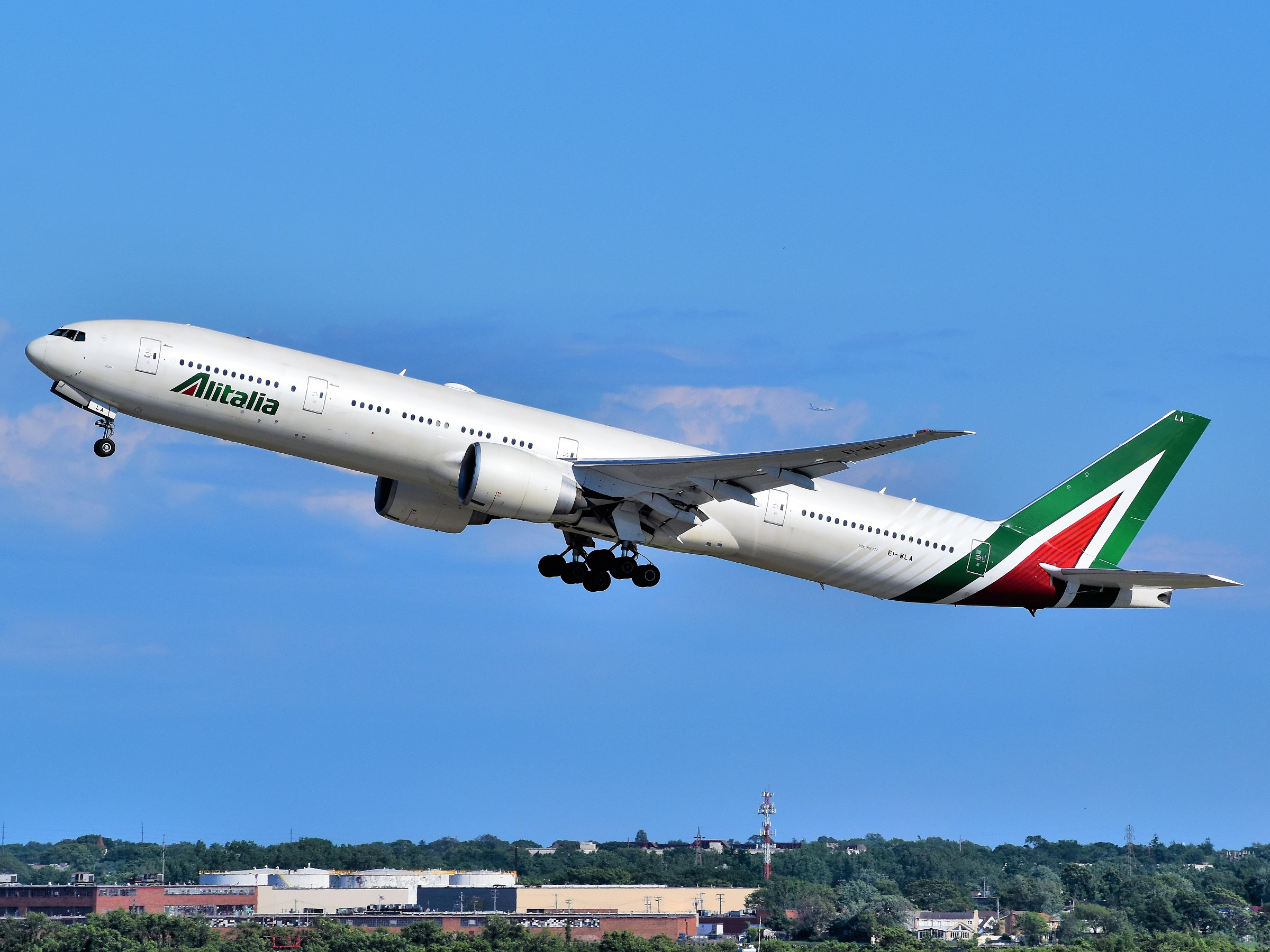
An Alitalia Boeing 777-300ER

As of November 1, 1957, the day of the effective operational merger with L.A.I., the fleet consisted of: 12 DC 3, 3 DC 6, 8 DC 6B, 2 DC 7C (+ 4 in order), 4 Convair CV 340, 3 Convair CV 440, 6 Vickers Vistount 700 (+ 4 in order).

Alitalia historical fleet from 60s onwards
Aircraft	Introduced	Retired
Airbus A300B2	1988	1997
Airbus A300B4	1980	1998
Airbus A321-100	1994	2020
Avro 691 Lancastrian	1947	1951
Boeing 727-200	1977	1985
Boeing 737-200C	1992	1995
Boeing 747-100	1970	1979
Boeing 747-200B	1971	2002
Boeing 767-300ER	1995	2012
Boeing 777-300ER	2017	2021
Convair CV-240	1953	1956
Convair CV-340	1953	1960
Convair 440 Metropolitan	1957	1960
Curtiss C-46 Commando	1962	1968
Douglas DC-3	1946	1964
Douglas DC-4	1950 1964	1954 1965
Douglas DC-6	1950	1963
Douglas DC-6B	1953	1971
Douglas DC-7C	1958	1965
Douglas DC-8-43	1960	1977
Douglas DC-8-62	1967	1981
McDonnell Douglas DC-9-30	1967	1996
Fiat G.12	1947	1950
Fokker F27	1964	1985
McDonnell Douglas DC-10	1973	1985
McDonnell Douglas MD-11	1991	2003
McDonnell Douglas MD-82	1983	2012
Savoia-Marchetti S.M.95	1947	1951
Sud Aviation Caravelle	1960	1977
Vickers Viscount	1957	1968

- Alitalia during the 1960s led European airlines into the Jet Age and it became the first airline in Europe to adopt an all jet aircraft fleet in 1969.
- The Boeing 767-300ER was introduced to the Alitalia-Linee Aeree Italiane fleet in 1994 in a bid to restructure its loss making international network. The first two aircraft joined the fleet in January 1995 and were wet-leased from AWAS whilst Alitalia sought to negotiate new pilot contracts and gain its own an ETOPS certification. To comply with European Union rules on long term wet-leasing, a deal with Monarch Airlines was negotiated in which the UK carrier would provide maintenance services and operate the aircraft on its own Air Operators' Certificate on behalf of Alitalia. Therefore, a third British registered 767 registered G-OITC joined the fleet from AWAS via Monarch and the original two aircraft were re-registered as G-OITA and G-OITB. Later in 1995, three more aircraft, leased from SALE in cooperation with AWAS, joined the fleet on wet-lease from Monarch - bringing the total number operated to six aircraft. Between November 1996 and April 1997, all aircraft were moved to the Italian aircraft register. The last aircraft retired after 17 years of service in 2012. The last 767 flight was AZ845 from Accra via Lagos to Rome on 25 October 2012.
- The McDonnell Douglas MD-82 was introduced to the Alitalia-Linee Aeree Italiane fleet in 1983, and then retired in 2012 after 29 years of service. The last flight with this aircraft type operated on 27 October 2012 using the plane with registration I-DATI on flight AZ1740 (Catania-Milan-Linate). The same aircraft on 17 December 2012 operated a memorial flight from Rome-Fiumicino Airport to Trieste Airport with journalists and ex-Alitalia's CEO Andrea Ragnetti on board. During landing, I-DATI was supported by Frecce Tricolori; they did a show for the occasion.

=== Special liveries ===
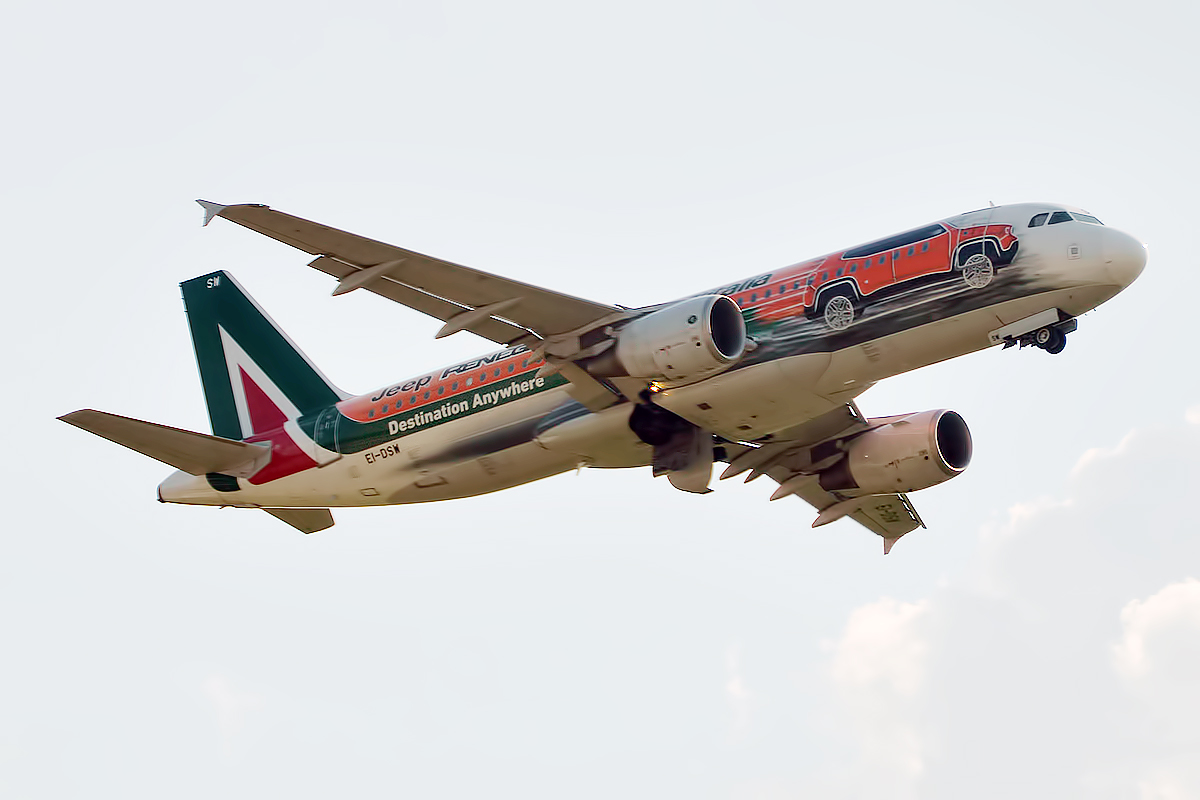
An Alitalia A320-200, registered as EI-DSW, in the Jeep Renegade livery.

- In mid-2009, a Boeing 767-300ER (EI-DBP) was painted in the SkyTeam livery.
- On 19 July 2010, an Airbus A320-200 (EI-DSA), which had previously been in the Air One livery, was painted in a special "Alitalia.com" livery. This plane is now wearing Alitalia-SAI livery.
- In March 2012, an Embraer E-190-100LR (EI-RND) was delivered in the SkyTeam livery.
- In March 2012, a Boeing 777-200ER (EI-DDH) was painted in the SkyTeam livery.
- In April 2012, an Airbus A321-100 (EI-IXI) was painted in the historic livery of Freccia Alata-Linee Aeree Italiane, Alitalia's predecessor. This plane is now scrapped.
- In November 2013, an Airbus A330-200 (EI-DIR), which had previously been in the Air One livery, was painted in the SkyTeam livery.
- In March 2014, an Airbus A330-200 (EI-EJG) and an Airbus A320-200 (EI-DSM) were painted in a special livery dedicated to Calabria. EI-EJG is now wearing Alitalia-SAI livery and EI-DSM is sold to Congo Airways.
- In April 2014, an Airbus A319-100 (EI-IMI) was painted in a special livery dedicated to Friuli-Venezia Giulia. From August 2015 this plane is wearing Alitalia-SAI livery.
- In October 2014, an Airbus A330-200 (EI-EJM) was painted in a special livery, in cooperation with its partner Etihad Airways, dedicated to Expo 2015. This plane is now wearing Alitalia-SAI livery.
- In December 2014, an Airbus A320-200 (EI-DSW) was painted in a Jeep Renegade Livery. The plane is now wearing Alitalia-SAI livery.

== Services ==
=== In-flight services ===
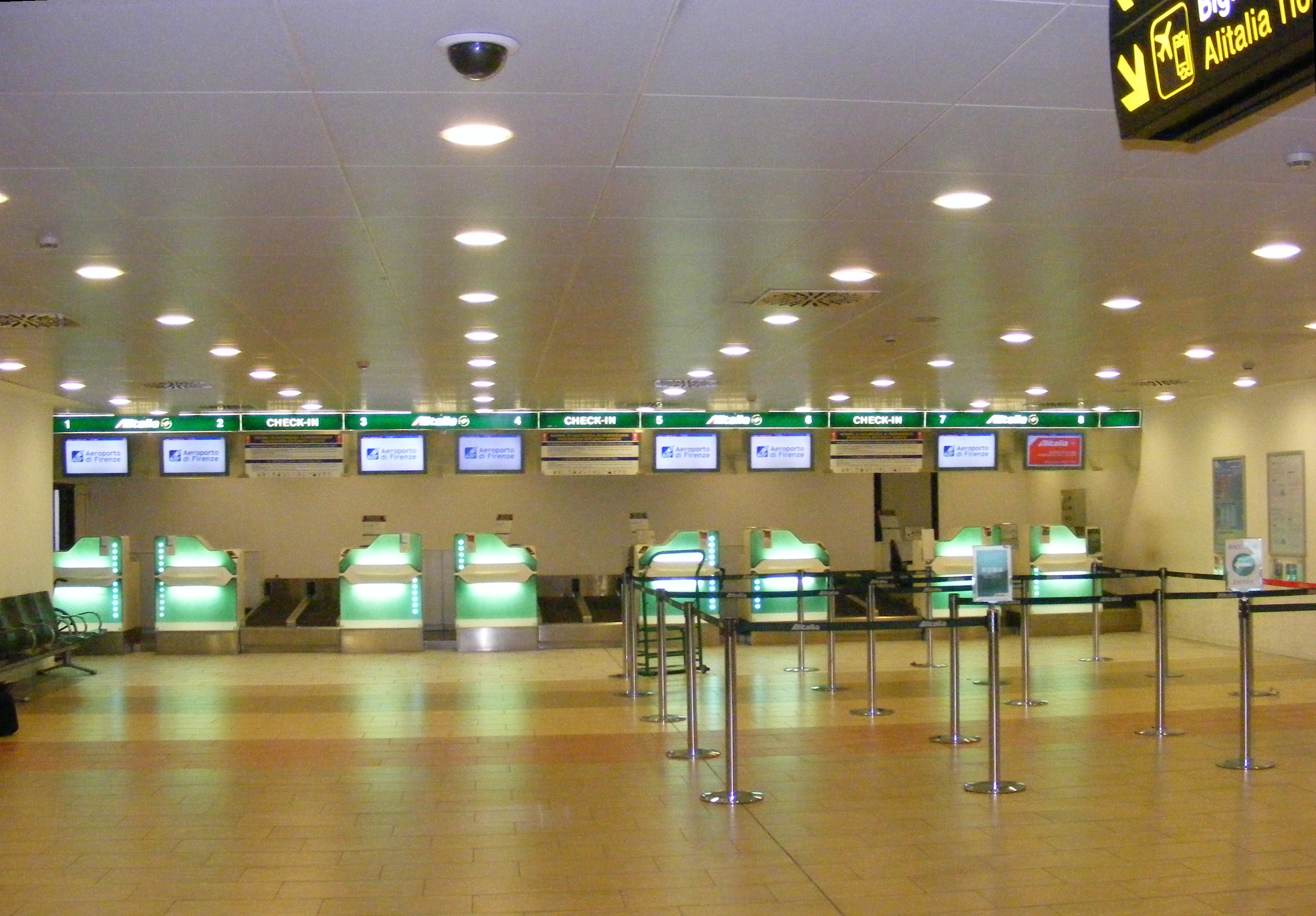
Alitalia's check-in area in Florence Airport.

Alitalia had four classes of service: Economy, Premium Economy, Business Class Medium Haul and Magnifica. Only long haul aircraft offered WiFi and seat-back entertainment.

=== Frequent-flyer program ===
The airline's frequent-flyer program was named "MilleMiglia" (thousand miles), and was part of the SkyTeam alliance program, which allowed passengers to collect miles and redeem them with free tickets across the whole alliance.

It also granted access to Alitalia's Privilege clubs, Ulisse, Freccia Alata, and Freccia Alata Plus, depending on the number of miles collected in a year, with various advantages depending on the club. These clubs gave access to SkyTeam Elite (Ulisse) and SkyTeam Elite+ (Freccia Alata, Freccia Alata plus).

On 3 February 2015, Etihad Airways acquired a 75 per cent stake in Alitalia Loyalty S.p.A., the owner and operator of MilleMiglia, with Alitalia retaining the remaining 25 per cent stake. Alitalia Loyalty was now part of Global Loyalty Company (GLC), a loyalty and lifestyle company that aimed to allow Etihad Airways and its partners to target the global loyalty market more effectively. GLC also consists of Etihad Airways' Etihad Guest. Together, Etihad Guest, topbonus, JetPrivilege and MilleMiglia had a combined total of 14 million members worldwide. However, on 18 December 2018, Alitalia and Global Loyalty Company LLC signed an agreement under which Global Loyalty Company LLC sold the 75% of Alitalia Loyalty S.p.A. to the Italian carrier.

== Accidents and incidents ==
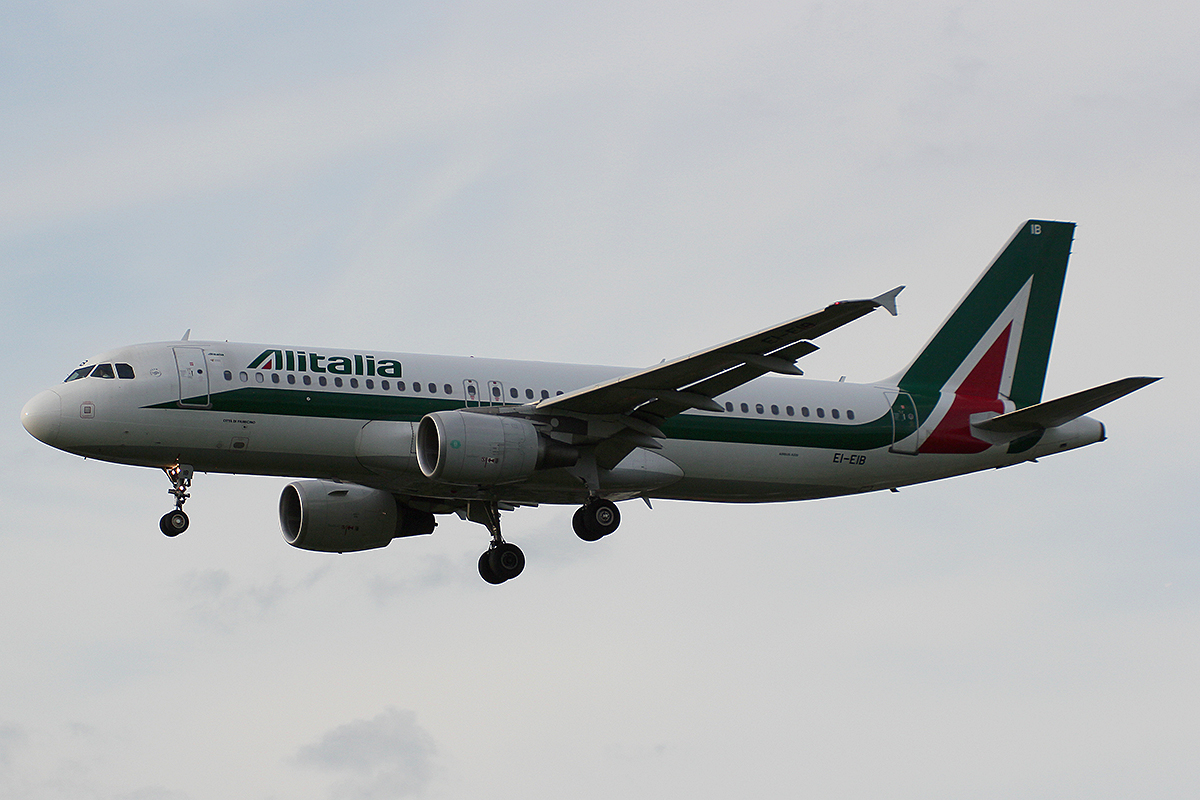
An Alitalia A320-200, registered as EI-EIB, which was involved on 29 September 2013 incident.

Eight Alitalia flights were hijacked, and 29 aircraft accidents or incidents involved Alitalia planes.

On 26 June 1970, an Alitalia Douglas DC-8 flying from Tehran to Beirut was hit by an air-to-air missile shot gone astray during an air battle over Syria. The plane performed an emergency landing in Beirut without any casualty and was later repaired.

Two Alitalia pilots, Alberto Nassetti and Pier Paolo Racchetti, were killed as passengers during the Airbus Industrie Flight 129 crash on 30 June 1994. Alitalia dedicated two Boeing 767 aircraft to the lost pilots.

- On 30 June 1982, an Alitalia Boeing 747 with 340 passengers was hijacked by a Sri Lankan man, Sepala Ekanayake. He demanded $300,000, for the plane to fly to Bangkok-Don Muang International Airport and for his wife and son to be brought to Bangkok. After the hijacking Sepala Ekanayake was sent to Sri Lanka where he was arrested and sentenced to prison.
- On 24 April 2011, an attempt was made to hijack Alitalia Flight 329 en route from Charles de Gaulle Airport, Paris, France, to Fiumicino Airport, Rome, Italy, and divert it to Tripoli International Airport, Libya. The hijacker, reported to be an advisor to the Kazakhstan delegation to UNESCO, was subdued by cabin crew and other passengers. On 5 May 2017, cabin crew member Ermenegildo Rossi received the Gold Medal for Civil Merit for his role in subduing the hijacker. The hijacker was arrested and taken into custody after the aircraft made a safe landing at Rome-Fiumicino.

Flight	Date	Aircraft	Location	Description	Injuries			
Flight	Date	Aircraft	Location	Description	Fatal	Serious	Minor	Uninjured
451	18 December 1954	Douglas DC-6B	New York, Idlewild Airport	The DC-6 was on its fourth attempt to land at New York-Idlewild when it struck the pier which supported the left row of runway 04 slope line approach lights.	26	6	0	0
	21 December 1959	Vickers Viscount	Rome, Ciampino Airport	Crashed short of the runway while used for a crew check involving a simulated emergency landing.	2	0	0	0
618	26 February 1960	Douglas DC-7C	Shannon, Ireland, Shannon Airport	Crashed after losing height after takeoff for unknown reasons.	34	18	0	0
771	7 July 1962	Douglas DC-8	Mumbai, Sahar International Airport, India	Controlled flight into terrain while on a night-time approach following a navigation error that caused a premature descent.	94	0	0	0
045	28 March 1964	Vickers Viscount	Naples, Monte Somma, Italy	Crashed during an incorrect visual approach to Naples International Airport at night in bad weather conditions.	45	0	0	0
660	2 August 1968	Douglas DC-8	Milan, Malpensa Airport, Italy	Crashed following a non-standard approach procedure in very severe weather conditions.	13	0	82	0
112	5 May 1972	Douglas DC-8	Palermo, Punta Raisi Airport, Italy	Controlled flight into terrain while on a night-time approach non-compliant with the established procedures.	115	0	0	0
4128	23 December 1978	McDonnell Douglas DC-9	Palermo, Punta Raisi Airport, Italy	Crashed in the sea shortly before landing while on a night-time approach following a premature descent.	107	0	0	21
404	14 November 1990	McDonnell Douglas DC-9	Zürich, Kloten Airport, Switzerland	Controlled flight into terrain while on a night-time approach after descending below the glide path because of incorrect indications in the NAV equipment.	46	0	0	0
1670	2 February 2013	ATR 72-500	Rome, Leonardo da Vinci–Fiumicino Airport, Italy	A Carpatair ATR 72 YR-ATS operating on behalf Alitalia, experienced a hard landing because of strong gusty wind at Leonardo da Vinci–Fiumicino Airport in Rome while arriving from Pisa.	0	2	14	34
063	29 September 2013	Airbus A320	Rome, Leonardo da Vinci–Fiumicino Airport, Italy	An Airbus A320 EI-EIB flying from Madrid–Barajas Airport to Leonardo da Vinci–Fiumicino Airport was unable to fully lower the right main landing gear on landing during a storm. The aircraft toppled and skidded off the runway.	0	0	10	147

== See also ==
- Transport in Italy
- List of airlines of Italy
- List of airports in Italy
- List of companies of Italy
- ITA Airways

== Bibliography ==
- Vent'anni di Alitalia (in Italian). Roma (Rome): Alitalia (Ed. Freccia Alata). 1961.
- Quilici, M. (1973). Quarant'anni di aviazione civile 1931-1971 (in Italian). Roma (Rome): Museo Aeronautico Caproni di Taliedo.
- Gianvanni, Paolo (1979). 1945-1960 - Trasporti aerei in Italia dalla guerra all'era del getto (in Italian). Firenze (Florence): Ed.A.I.
- D'Avanzo, Giuseppe (2007). La Freccia Alata (in Italian). 3D Midia.
- Il Gruppo Alitalia dall'A alla Z (in Italian). Roma (Rome): Alitalia. 1983.
- Alitalia 40 years (1947-1987). Roma (Rome): Gruppo Alitalia.
