= Italygate =

American conspiracy theory

Italygate is a pro-Trump, QAnon-affiliated conspiracy theory that alleges the 2020 United States presidential election was rigged to favor Joe Biden using satellites and military technology to remotely switch votes from Donald Trump to Biden from the U.S. Embassy in Rome. The conspiracy was also rumored to involve the Vatican. Fact-checkers at Reuters and USA Today, who investigated these claims, described them as "false" and "baseless".

== Details and propagation of theory ==
Maria Strollo Zack, a Georgia-based lobbyist and leader of the 501(c)4 organization Nations in Action, said she told Trump about the conspiracy theory at his Mar-a-Lago resort on December 24, 2020. On December 29, Mark Meadows forwarded a letter explaining the Italygate claims to acting Attorney General Jeffrey Rosen. The letter was printed on the letterhead of USAerospace Partners, a company led by Republican businesswoman Michele Roosevelt Edwards.

On January 6, 2021, the Institute for Good Governance – a firm also headed by Edwards – released a joint statement with Nations in Action stating an Italian hacker named Arturo D'Elia had confessed to "using Leonardo computer systems and military satellites located in Pescara, Italy" to change U.S. election results. The Italian bureau of prisons later said it was investigating how two American men gained access to the Salerno prison where they tried to interrogate D'Elia. D'Elia told reporters that he had refused to speak with the Americans, and that he had no connection to the alleged conspiracy, saying, "I didn't steal anything. I didn’t pass anything to anyone. I just created malware."

According to Zack, the operation had been coordinated by the American embassy in Rome, with the help of Italian general Claudio Graziano who was a member of the board of Leonardo. Also on January 6, Media Matters for America reported supporters of the theory were trying to get "#ItalyDidIt" to trend on Twitter. Related posts were retweeted by QAnon promoter Ron Watkins and other conspiracy theorists affiliated with the movement.

On January 11, a power blackout in Vatican City sparked a rumor among QAnon followers that Pope Francis had been arrested for his involvement in "Italygate" and that the blackout had been orchestrated by the police in order to cover the operation. Around the same time, a photo circulated on the Internet, which purportedly showed Secretary of State Mike Pompeo arresting Italian president Sergio Mattarella for his role in the conspiracy (both men wearing face masks); the picture had actually been taken during Pompeo's October 2020 visit to India and showed Pompeo with ambassador Kenneth Juster.

== Role of Mark Meadows ==
According to The New York Times, during Trump's last weeks in office, his chief of staff Mark Meadows tried to persuade the Department of Justice to investigate these claims. Meadows emailed Rosen a link to a YouTube video about the claims; Rosen forwarded the email to his deputy Richard Donoghue, who responded it was "pure insanity". The Washington Post commented that Italygate was "the craziest election fraud conspiracy" pushed by Trump's associates, which showed "just how desperate President Donald Trump and his team were to grab hold of something – anything – that could genuinely cast doubt on his election defeat".

== See also ==
- Attempts to overturn the 2020 United States presidential election
- United States House Select Committee on the January 6 Attack public hearings
