= Willoughby–Baylor House =

Historic house in Virginia, United States

- U.S. National Register of Historic Places
- Virginia Landmarks Register
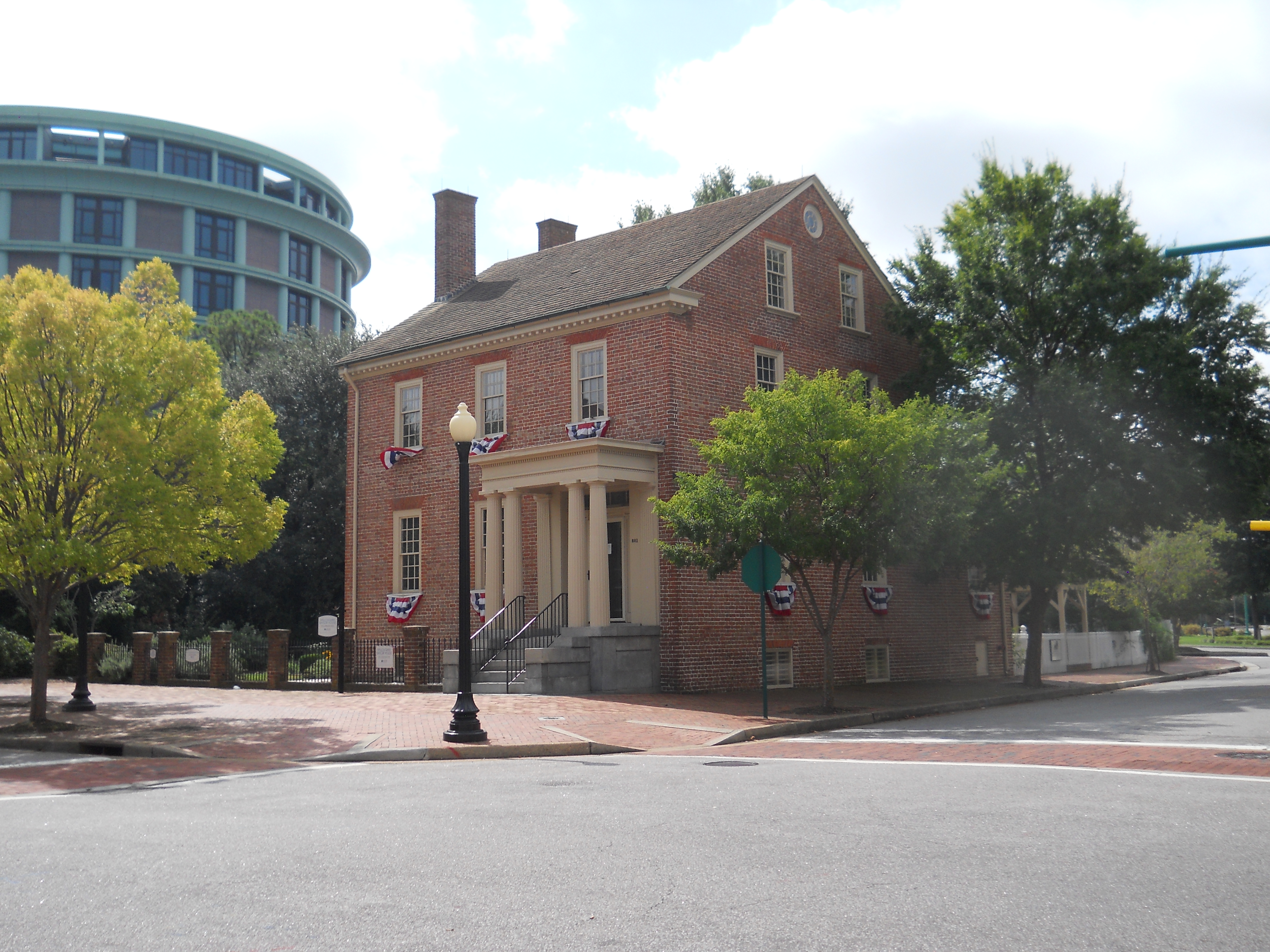
- Willoughby–Baylor House, September 2013

- Location within Virginia Location within the United States
- Location: 601 Freemason St., Norfolk, Virginia
- Coordinates: 36°50′58″N 76°17′9″W
- Area: 9.9 acres (4.0 ha)
- Built: 1794
- Architectural style: Greek Revival
- NRHP reference No.: 71001060
- VLR No.: 122-0033

Significant dates
- Added to NRHP: September 22, 1971
- Designated VLR: April 6, 1971

The Willoughby–Baylor House is a historic home located at Norfolk, Virginia. It was built about 1794, and is a two-story, three-bay, brick detached townhouse with a gable roof. It features a Greek Revival style doorway and porch supported on two pairs of Greek Doric order columns. These features were added in the mid-1820s. It was built by William Willoughby (1758–1800), a local merchant and building contractor. The building used to be open as a historic house museum operated by the Chrysler Museum of Art, but closed in 2020.

It was listed on the National Register of Historic Places in 1971.
