= North Wales (Warrenton, Virginia) =

Historic house in Virginia, United States

- U.S. National Register of Historic Places
- U.S. Historic district
- Virginia Landmarks Register
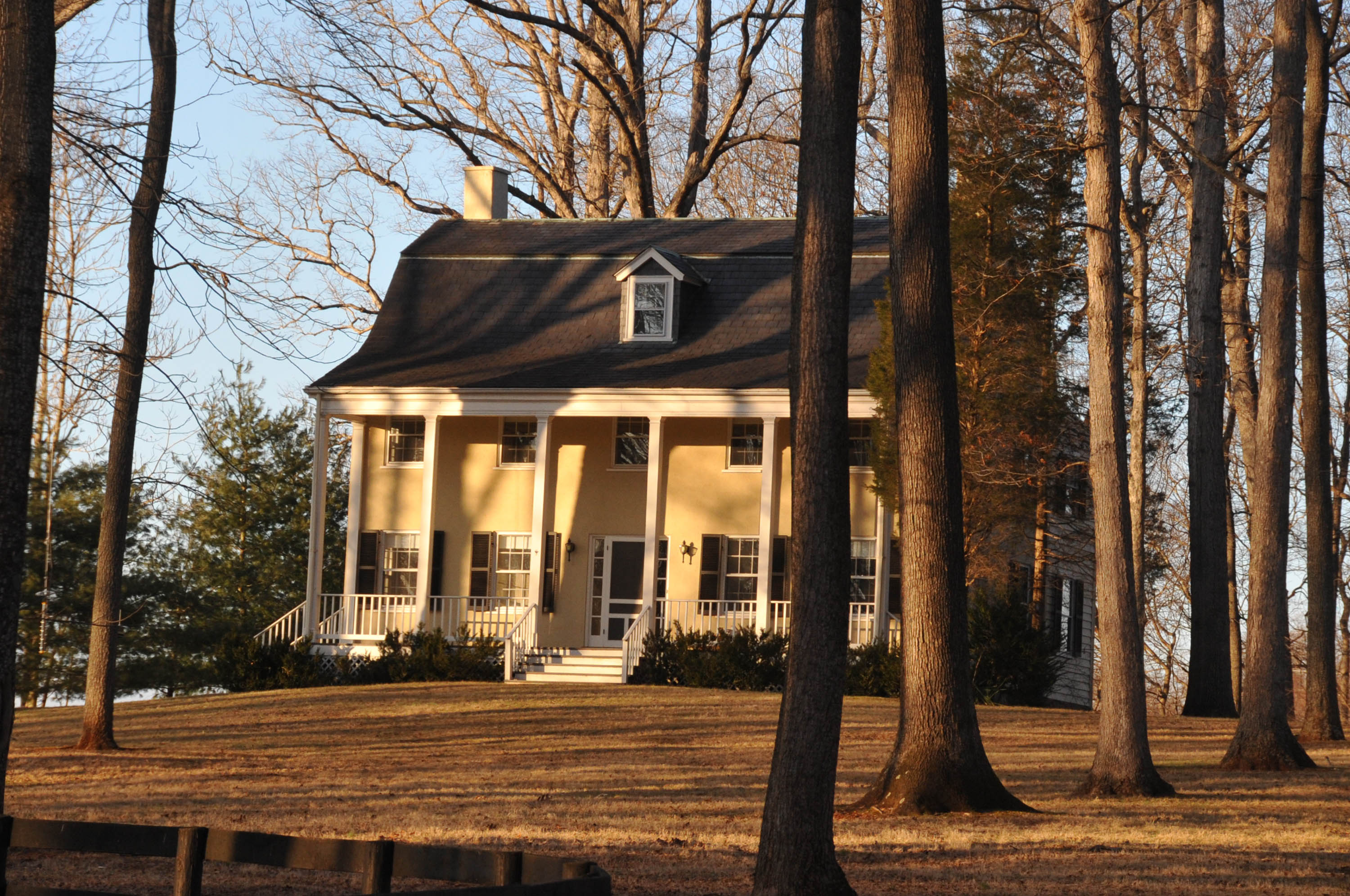

- Location within Northern Virginia Location within Virginia Location within the United States
- Location: 7500 Ironwood Ln., Warrenton, Virginia
- Coordinates: 38°40′36″N 77°49′21″W
- Area: 1,287.9 acres (521.2 ha)
- Built: 1776
- Architect: Little & Browne; et al.
- Architectural style: Georgian, Colonial Revival
- NRHP reference No.: 99000726
- VLR No.: 030-0093

Significant dates
- Added to NRHP: June 29, 1999
- Designated VLR: March 17, 1999

North Wales is a historic plantation and national historic district located in Fauquier County, Virginia near Warrenton, Virginia. Currently it is a 1,287.9-acre (521.2 ha) historic district that includes a manor home and farm. A date of significance for the site is 1776. It was listed on the National Register of Historic Places in 1999. William Allason, merchant, of Falmouth, Virginia, established North Wales as a plantation and built the original Georgian-style stone house on the property sometime during the 1776–1796 period. It remained a working plantation and farm for six generations of descendents of Allason and his wife Anne Hooe.

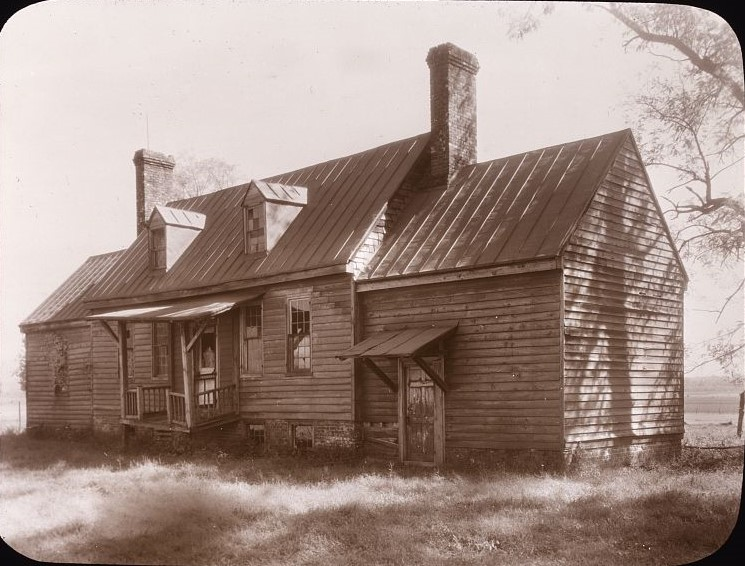
North Wales, Service building, by Frances Benjamin Johnston, 1935.

The listed area includes work by Little & Browne and other architects and/or builders. It includes Georgian and Colonial Revival architecture in 38 contributing buildings, eight contributing sites and contributing structures.

The estate on 1,471 acres was sold to former Goldman Sachs partner David B. Ford September 30, 2014 for $21 million. Ford has acquired other historic properties including the noted record-breaking purchase of Newport, RI Gilded Age mansion Miramar by architect Horace Trumbauer, for $17.15 million in 2006.
