= Alitalia fleet =

Alitalia was the national airline of Italy until it ceased operations in 2021. The airline operated a fleet of number of different aircraft, including Airbus, Boeing and McDonnell Douglas aircraft, and flew to domestic, European and international destinations.

== Previous aircraft ==
Aircraft used by Alitalia included the following:

Aircraft	Image	Total	No. seats	Introduced	Retired	Remark	Refs
Aermacchi MB-326D		4	2	1963	1967	I-ADIA, I-ADIB, I-ADIC, I-ADIE for training purpose	
Airbus A300B2-203		2	341	1988	1996	I-BUSM, I-BUSN	
Airbus A300B4-103		4	341	1988	1997		
Airbus A300B4-203		8	341	1980	1997		
Airbus A319-112		11	144	2002	2013		
Airbus A320-214		13	165	1999	2018		
Airbus A320-216		42	165	1999	2018		
Airbus A321-112		23	200	1994	2014	EI-IXI in retro livery	
Airbus A330-202		14	255	2009	2021	EI-DIR in SkyTeam livery	
ATR 42-300		9	46	1996	2007	Operated by Alitalia Express	
ATR 72–212		12	66	1996	2013	Operated by Alitalia Express; YR-ATS Flight AZ1670	
Avro 652A Anson I		1	n/a	1948	1949	I-AHBN, trainer for the Lancastrian pilot	
Avro 691 Lancastrian Mk.III		5	9	1947	1952	Operated on the trans-continental routes I-AHBX Dakar accident	
Avro RJ70		5	n/a	2000	2004	Operated by Azzurra Air	
Boeing 707-138B		1	192	1978	1979	OE-IRA leased from Montana Austria	
Boeing 727-243 Advanced		18	189	1976	1985		
Boeing 737-248C		2	Cargo	1992	1995	Leased from Aer Lingus	
Boeing 747-143A		2	369	1970	1981		
Boeing 747-243B		14	495	1971	2002	I-DEMF in Baci Perugina livery	
Boeing 747-243F		5	Cargo	1981	2006		
Boeing 767-31B(ER)		14	214	1995	2012	EI-DBP in SkyTeam livery I-DEIL Flight AZ600]	
Boeing 777-243ER		12	293	2002	2013		
Bombardier CRJ900ER		10	90	2011	2014	Operated by Alitalia CityLiner	
Convair CV-340-41/440 Metropolitan		3	48	1953	1962		
Convair CV-440-81 Metropolitan		3	48	1954	1962		
Curtiss C-46A-45		2	Cargo	1962	1968	I-SILA, I-SILV	
Dornier 328-110		10	35	1998	2003	Operated by Minerva Airlines; D-CPRR Flight AZ1553	
Douglas DC-3		13	30	1962	1968		
Douglas C-54A Skymaster		4	Cargo	1965	1968	D-ABAC, D-ACAB, D-ADAR leased from Transportflug; EI-APK leased from Aer Turas	
Douglas DC-4		4	n/a	1950	1954		
Douglas DC-6B		14	96	1953	1970	I-LEAD Flight AZ451	
Douglas DC-7C Seven Seas		6	102	1957	1966	I-DUVA, I-DUVE transformed in cargo I-DUVO Flight AZ618	
Douglas DC-8-43		15	142	1960	1977	I-DIWD Flight AZ771, I-DIWF Flight AZ660] I-DIWL Flight AZ713; I-DIWB Flight AZ112	
Douglas DC-8-62		9	152	1967	1981	I-DIWZ Flight AZ618	
Douglas DC-8-62CF		2	cargo	1967	1981		
Embraer E170		6	72	2004	2012	Operated by Alitalia Express	
Embraer E190		5	100	2011	2021		
Embraer ERJ145LR		14	48	2000	2009	Operated by Alitalia Express	
Fiat G.12CA		4	18	1947	1948		
Fiat G.12LB		5	22	1948	1950		
McDonnell Douglas DC-9-32		43	107	1967	1997	I-DIKQ Flight AZ4128; I-ATJA Flight AZ404	
McDonnell Douglas DC-9-32F		3	Cargo	1968	1981		
McDonnell Douglas DC-10-30		8	345	1973	1986		
McDonnell Douglas MD-11		2	261	1994	2004	I-DUPC, I-DUPD	
McDonnell Douglas MD-11C		1	261	1993	2004	I-DUPO Flight AZ664	
McDonnell Douglas MD-11C (Combi)		5	200	1991	2009	All converted to MD-11F in 2005	
McDonnell Douglas MD-82		90	164	1984	2012	I-DAWR Flight AZ1357	
Piaggio P.166DL3		2	2+8	1981	1986	I-PIAC, I-PIAE	
Piper PA-42-720 IIIA Cheyenne		5	2+6	1986	2006	for training purposes	
Savoia-Marchetti SM.95C		8	n/a	1947	1952	I-DALO Civitavecchia accident	
SIAI-Marchetti SF.260		7	3	1980	1997	Used for training purposes	
Sud Aviation SE-210 Caravelle III		4	80	1960	1977		
Sud Aviation SE-210 Caravelle VI-N		17	80	1961	1977	I-DABF Flight AZ342	
Vickers Viscount 745D		10	48	1957	1971		
Vickers Viscount 785D		8	48	1957	1969	I-LIZT Training flight I-LAKE Flight AZ045	

== See also ==
- Alitalia
- Alitalia Express
- Alitalia CityLiner
