= List of Alitalia destinations =

As of July 2020, Alitalia operated to 26 domestic and 88 international scheduled destinations. This list includes both Alitalia and Alitalia CityLiner destinations, excluding charter routes. To see the destinations of Alitalia's successor ITA Airways, see List of ITA Airways destinations.

== Destinations ==
Country	City	Airport	Notes	Refs
Albania	Tirana	Tirana International Airport Nënë Tereza		
Algeria	Algiers	Houari Boumediene Airport		
Algeria	Oran	Oran Es Senia Airport	Terminated	
Angola	Luanda	Quatro de Fevereiro Airport	Terminated	
Argentina	Buenos Aires	Ministro Pistarini International Airport		
Armenia	Yerevan	Zvartnots International Airport	Terminated	
Australia	Darwin	Darwin Airport	Terminated	
Australia	Melbourne	Melbourne Airport	Terminated	
Australia	Sydney	Sydney Airport	Terminated	
Austria	Vienna	Vienna International Airport	Terminated	
Belarus	Minsk	Minsk National Airport	Terminated	
Belgium	Brussels	Brussels Airport		
Bosnia and Herzegovina	Mostar	Mostar International Airport	Terminated	
Bosnia and Herzegovina	Sarajevo	Sarajevo International Airport	Terminated	
Brazil	Campinas	Viracopos–Campinas International Airport	Terminated	
Brazil	Fortaleza	Pinto Martins–Fortaleza International Airport	Terminated	
Brazil	Natal	Augusto Severo International Airport	Terminated	
Brazil	Recife	Recife/Guararapes–Gilberto Freyre International Airport	Terminated	
Brazil	Rio de Janeiro	Rio de Janeiro/Galeão International Airport		
Brazil	São Paulo	São Paulo/Guarulhos International Airport		
Bulgaria	Sofia	Sofia Airport		
Cambodia	Phnom Penh	Phnom Penh International Airport	Terminated	
Cameroon	Douala	Douala International Airport	Terminated	
Canada	Montreal	Montréal–Trudeau International Airport	Terminated	
Canada	Toronto	Toronto Pearson International Airport		
Canada	Vancouver	Vancouver International Airport	Terminated	
Cape Verde	Sal	Amílcar Cabral International Airport	Terminated	
Central African Republic	Bangui	Bangui M'Poko International Airport	Terminated	
Chile	Santiago	Arturo Merino Benítez International Airport	Terminated	
China	Beijing	Beijing Capital International Airport	Terminated	
China	Shanghai	Shanghai Pudong International Airport	Terminated	
Colombia	Bogotá	El Dorado International Airport	Terminated	
Croatia	Dubrovnik	Dubrovnik Airport	Seasonal	
Croatia	Split	Split Airport	Seasonal	
Croatia	Zagreb	Zagreb Airport	Terminated	
Cuba	Havana	José Martí International Airport	Seasonal	
Curaçao	Willemstad	Curaçao International Airport	Terminated	
Cyprus	Larnaca	Larnaca International Airport	Seasonal	
Cyprus	Nicosia	Nicosia International Airport	Terminated	
Czech Republic	Prague	Václav Havel Airport Prague		
Democratic Republic of the Congo	Kinshasa	N'djili Airport	Terminated	
Denmark	Copenhagen	Copenhagen Airport	Seasonal	
Egypt	Cairo	Cairo International Airport		
Egypt	Luxor	Luxor International Airport	Terminated	
Egypt	Sharm El Sheikh	Sharm El Sheikh International Airport	Seasonal	
Eritrea	Asmara	Asmara International Airport	Terminated	
Ethiopia	Addis Ababa	Addis Ababa Bole International Airport	Terminated	
France	Ajaccio	Ajaccio Napoleon Bonaparte Airport	Seasonal	
France	Bastia	Bastia – Poretta Airport	Terminated	
France	Bordeaux	Bordeaux–Mérignac Airport	Terminated	
France	Lyon	Lyon–Saint-Exupéry Airport	Terminated	
France	Marseille	Marseille Provence Airport		
France	Montpellier	Montpellier–Méditerranée Airport	Terminated	
France	Nice	Nice Côte d'Azur Airport		
France	Paris	Charles de Gaulle Airport		
France	Paris	Orly Airport		
France	Strasbourg	Strasbourg Airport	Terminated	
France	Toulouse	Toulouse–Blagnac Airport		
Georgia	Tbilisi	Tbilisi International Airport	Terminated	
Germany	Berlin	Berlin Brandenburg Airport		
Germany	Berlin	Berlin Tegel Airport	Airport closed	
Germany	Berlin	Berlin Tempelhof Airport	Airport closed	
Germany	Cologne	Cologne Bonn Airport		
Germany	Düsseldorf	Düsseldorf Airport		
Germany	Frankfurt	Frankfurt Airport		
Germany	Hamburg	Hamburg Airport		
Germany	Hanover	Hannover Airport	Terminated	
Germany	Munich	Munich Airport		
Germany	Nuremberg	Nuremberg Airport	Terminated	
Germany	Stuttgart	Stuttgart Airport		
Ghana	Accra	Accra International Airport	Terminated	
Greece	Athens	Athens International Airport		
Greece	Corfu	Corfu International Airport	Seasonal	
Greece	Heraklion	Heraklion International Airport	Seasonal	
Greece	Kephalonia	Kephalonia International Airport	Seasonal	
Greece	Mykonos	Mykonos Airport	Seasonal	
Greece	Rhodes	Rhodes International Airport	Seasonal	
Greece	Santorini	Santorini (Thira) International Airport	Terminated	
Greece	Thessaloniki	Thessaloniki Airport	Seasonal	
Hong Kong	Hong Kong	Hong Kong International Airport	Terminated	
Hong Kong	Hong Kong	Kai Tak Airport	Airport closed	
Hungary	Budapest	Budapest Ferenc Liszt International Airport		
India	Delhi	Indira Gandhi International Airport		
India	Mumbai	Chhatrapati Shivaji Maharaj International Airport	Terminated	
Indonesia	Jakarta	Soekarno–Hatta International Airport	Terminated	
Iran	Tehran	Imam Khomeini International Airport	Terminated	
Iraq	Baghdad	Baghdad International Airport	Terminated	
Ireland	Dublin	Dublin Airport	Terminated	
Israel	Tel Aviv	Ben Gurion Airport		
Italy	Albenga	Albenga Airport	Terminated	
Italy	Alghero	Alghero–Fertilia Airport		
Italy	Ancona	Ancona Falconara Airport	Terminated	
Italy	Bari	Bari Karol Wojtyła Airport		
Italy	Bergamo	Orio al Serio International Airport		
Italy	Bologna	Bologna Guglielmo Marconi Airport		
Italy	Bolzano	Bolzano Airport	Terminated	
Italy	Brindisi	Brindisi Airport		
Italy	Cagliari	Cagliari Elmas Airport		
Italy	Catania	Catania–Fontanarossa Airport	Focus city	
Italy	Comiso	Comiso Airport		
Italy	Crotone	Crotone Airport	Terminated	
Italy	Florence	Florence Airport		
Italy	Genoa	Genoa Cristoforo Colombo Airport		
Italy	Lamezia Terme	Lamezia Terme International Airport		
Italy	Lampedusa	Lampedusa Airport	Seasonal	
Italy	Milan	Milan Linate Airport	Secondary hub	
Italy	Milan	Milan Malpensa Airport	Focus city	
Italy	Naples	Naples International Airport		
Italy	Olbia	Olbia Costa Smeralda Airport		
Italy	Palermo	Falcone Borsellino Airport	Focus city	
Italy	Pantelleria	Pantelleria Airport	Seasonal	
Italy	Parma	Parma Airport	Terminated	
Italy	Perugia	Perugia San Francesco d'Assisi – Umbria International Airport		
Italy	Pescara	Abruzzo Airport		
Italy	Pisa	Pisa International Airport		
Italy	Reggio Calabria	Reggio Calabria Airport		
Italy	Rimini	Federico Fellini International Airport	Terminated	
Italy	Rome	Leonardo da Vinci–Fiumicino Airport	Hub	
Italy	Salerno	Salerno Costa d'Amalfi Airport	Terminated	
Italy	Trapani	Vincenzo Florio Airport Trapani–Birgi		
Italy	Trieste	Trieste – Friuli Venezia Giulia Airport		
Italy	Turin	Turin Airport		
Italy	Venice	Venice Marco Polo Airport		
Italy	Verona	Verona Villafranca Airport		
Ivory Coast	Abidjan	Félix-Houphouët-Boigny International Airport	Terminated	
Japan	Osaka	Kansai International Airport	Terminated	
Japan	Tokyo	Haneda Airport		
Japan	Tokyo	Narita International Airport		
Jordan	Amman	Queen Alia International Airport	Seasonal	
Kenya	Nairobi	Jomo Kenyatta International Airport	Terminated	
Kuwait	Kuwait City	Kuwait International Airport	Terminated	
Lebanon	Beirut	Beirut–Rafic Hariri International Airport		
Libya	Benghazi	Benina International Airport	Terminated	
Libya	Tripoli	Mitiga International Airport	Terminated	
Libya	Tripoli	Tripoli International Airport	Terminated	
Luxembourg	Luxembourg City	Luxembourg Airport		
Macedonia	Skopje	Skopje International Airport	Terminated	
Madagascar	Antananarivo	Ivato International Airport	Terminated	
Malaysia	Kuala Lumpur	Kuala Lumpur International Airport	Terminated	
Maldives	Malé	Velana International Airport	Seasonal	
Malta	Malta	Malta International Airport		
Mauritius	Port Louis	Sir Seewoosagur Ramgoolam International Airport	Seasonal	
Mexico	Mexico City	Mexico City International Airport		
Montenegro	Podgorica	Podgorica Airport		
Morocco	Casablanca	Mohammed V International Airport		
Morocco	Marrakesh	Marrakesh Menara Airport	Terminated	
New Zealand	Auckland	Auckland Airport	Terminated	
Nigeria	Kano	Mallam Aminu Kano International Airport	Terminated	
Nigeria	Lagos	Murtala Muhammed International Airport	Terminated	
Norway	Oslo	Oslo Fornebu Airport	Terminated	
Pakistan	Karachi	Jinnah International Airport	Terminated	
Peru	Lima	Jorge Chávez International Airport	Terminated	
Philippines	Manila	Ninoy Aquino International Airport	Terminated	
Poland	Kraków	Kraków John Paul II International Airport	Terminated	
Poland	Warsaw	Warsaw Chopin Airport		
Portugal	Lisbon	Lisbon Portela International Airport	Terminated	
Portugal	Porto	Porto Airport	Terminated	
Portugal	Vila do Porto	Santa Maria Airport	Terminated	
Republic of the Congo	Brazzaville	Maya-Maya Airport	Terminated	
Romania	Bucharest	Henri Coandă International Airport	Terminated	
Romania	Timișoara	Traian Vuia International Airport	Terminated	
Russia	Moscow	Sheremetyevo International Airport		
Russia	Saint Petersburg	Pulkovo Airport	Seasonal	
Russia	Yekaterinburg	Koltsovo International Airport	Terminated	
Saudi Arabia	Dhahran	Dhahran International Airport	Airport closed	
Saudi Arabia	Jeddah	King Abdulaziz International Airport	Terminated	
Saudi Arabia	Riyadh	King Khalid International Airport	Terminated	
Senegal	Dakar	Léopold Sédar Senghor International Airport	Terminated	
Serbia	Belgrade	Belgrade Nikola Tesla Airport		
Seychelles	Mahé	Seychelles International Airport	Terminated	
Singapore	Singapore	Changi Airport	Terminated	
Somalia	Mogadishu	Aden Adde International Airport	Terminated	
South Africa	Johannesburg	O. R. Tambo International Airport		
South Korea	Seoul	Incheon International Airport	Terminated	
Spain	Barcelona	Josep Tarradellas Barcelona–El Prat Airport		
Spain	Bilbao	Bilbao Airport	Terminated	
Spain	Ibiza	Ibiza Airport	Seasonal	
Spain	Las Palmas	Gran Canaria Airport	Terminated	
Spain	Madrid	Madrid–Barajas Airport		
Spain	Málaga	Málaga Airport		
Spain	Menorca	Menorca Airport	Seasonal	
Spain	Palma de Mallorca	Palma de Mallorca Airport	Seasonal	
Spain	Seville	San Pablo Airport	Terminated	
Spain	Tenerife	Tenerife North Airport	Seasonal	
Spain	Valencia	Valencia Airport		
Sudan	Khartoum	Khartoum International Airport	Terminated	
Sweden	Stockholm	Stockholm Arlanda Airport	Seasonal	
Switzerland	Geneva	Geneva Airport		
Switzerland	Zurich	Zurich Airport		
Switzerland	Basel	EuroAirport Basel Mulhouse Freiburg	Terminated	
France	Mulhouse	EuroAirport Basel Mulhouse Freiburg	Terminated	
Germany	Freiburg	EuroAirport Basel Mulhouse Freiburg	Terminated	
Syria	Damascus	Damascus International Airport	Terminated	
Tanzania	Dar es Salaam	Julius Nyerere International Airport	Terminated	
Thailand	Bangkok	Don Mueang International Airport	Terminated	
Tunisia	Djerba	Djerba–Zarzis International Airport	Terminated	
Tunisia	Tunis	Tunis–Carthage International Airport		
Turkey	Ankara	Esenboğa International Airport	Terminated	
Turkey	Antalya	Antalya Airport	Terminated	
Turkey	Istanbul	Atatürk Airport	Terminated	
Uganda	Entebbe	Entebbe International Airport	Terminated	
Ukraine	Kyiv	Boryspil International Airport	Terminated	
Ukraine	Kyiv	Kyiv International Airport		
United Arab Emirates	Abu Dhabi	Abu Dhabi International Airport	Terminated	
United Arab Emirates	Dubai	Dubai International Airport	Terminated	
United Kingdom	Birmingham	Birmingham Airport	Terminated	
United Kingdom	Edinburgh	Edinburgh Airport	Terminated	
United Kingdom	London	London City Airport		
United Kingdom	London	Gatwick Airport	Terminated	
United Kingdom	London	Heathrow Airport		
United Kingdom	Manchester	Manchester Airport	Terminated	
United States	Atlanta	Hartsfield–Jackson Atlanta International Airport	Terminated	
United States	Boston	Logan International Airport		
United States	Chicago	O'Hare International Airport		
United States	Detroit	Detroit Metropolitan Airport	Terminated	
United States	Los Angeles	Los Angeles International Airport		
United States	Miami	Miami International Airport		
United States	Newark	Newark Liberty International Airport	Terminated	
United States	New York City	John F. Kennedy International Airport		
United States	Philadelphia	Philadelphia International Airport	Terminated	
United States	San Francisco	San Francisco International Airport		
United States	Seattle	Seattle–Tacoma International Airport	Terminated	
United States	Washington, D.C.	Washington Dulles International Airport		
Uruguay	Montevideo	Carrasco International Airport	Terminated	
Venezuela	Caracas	Simón Bolívar International Airport	Terminated	
Yemen	Aden	Aden International Airport	Terminated	
Zambia	Lusaka	Kenneth Kaunda International Airport	Terminated	
Zimbabwe	Harare	Robert Gabriel Mugabe International Airport	Terminated	
