= February 25 =

Events on calendar date 25 February

February 25 this year in various calendars
- Wednesday, 25 February 2026
Akan	Kuruwukuo
Armenian	10 Areg 1475
Aztec	Tecuilhuitontli 6, 8 Ocēlōtl
Babylonian	7 Shabatu, 2336 SE
Balinese pawukon	Menga, Pasah, Laba, Pon, Paniron, Buda of Bala, Indra, Urungan, Sri
Bengali	12 Falgun, BS 1432
Chinese	Yang Metal Horse・Three Stars Mansion; Fire Horse Year, Month 1, Day 9 (Yushui, 8 days until Jingzhe)
Common Era	25 February 2026 CE
Coptic	18 Meshir, AM 1742
Egyptian	15 Epiphi, 2774 NE
Ethiopian	18 Yakātit, 2018 Amätä Məhrät
French Republican	Décade I, Septidi de Ventôse de l'Année 234 de la République
Gregorian	25 February, AD 2026
Hebrew	8 Adar, AM 5786
Hindu	Rohiṇi・Vaidhṛti; Solar: 13 Phālguna, 1947 SE; Lunisolar: Navamī, Śukla pakṣa of Phālguna, 2082 VE; Rāudra・5126 KY・1,872,631
Icelandic	Miðvikudagur, 4 Góa 2025
Islamic	8 Ramadan, AH 1447 (using tabular method)
ISO week date	2026-W09-3
Japanese	9 Mutsuki, Reiwa 8 (Usui, 8 days until Keichitsu)
Julian	12 February, AD 2026 (AM 7534)
Julian day	2461097
Korean	9 Horangidal, 4359 DE
Maya	13.0.13.6.14; 12 Kayab, 8 Ix
Roman	Pridie Idus Februarias, MMDCCLXXIX AUC
Solar Hijri	6 Esfand, SH 1404
Tibetan	9 mchu, me pho rta 2153 or 1772 or 1000

<<	February					>>
Su	Mo	Tu	We	Th	Fr	Sa
1	2	3	4	5	6	7
8	9	10	11	12	13	14
15	16	17	18	19	20	21
22	23	24	25	26	27	28
2026

February 25 in recent years
2026 (Wednesday)
2025 (Tuesday)
2024 (Sunday)
2023 (Saturday)
2022 (Friday)
2021 (Thursday)
2020 (Tuesday)
2019 (Monday)
2018 (Sunday)
2017 (Saturday)

February 25 is the 56th day of the year in the Gregorian calendar; 309 days remain until the end of the year (310 in leap years).

== Events ==
=== Pre-1600 ===
- 138 – Roman emperor Hadrian adopts Antoninus Pius as his son, effectively making him his successor.
- 628 – Khosrow II, the last great Shah of the Sasanian Empire (Iran), is overthrown by his son Kavadh II.

=== 1601–1900 ===
- 1705 – George Frideric Handel's opera Nero premieres in Hamburg.
- 1836 – Samuel Colt is granted a United States patent for his revolver firearm.
- 1843 – Lord George Paulet occupies the Kingdom of Hawaii in the name of Great Britain in the Paulet affair.
- 1870 – Hiram Rhodes Revels, a Republican from Mississippi, is sworn into the United States Senate, becoming the first African American ever to sit in Congress.
- 1875 – Guangxu Emperor of Qing dynasty China begins his reign, under Empress Dowager Cixi's regency.

=== 1901–present ===
- 1912 – Marie-Adélaïde, the eldest of six daughters of Guillaume IV, becomes the first reigning Grand Duchess of Luxembourg.
- 1916 – World War I: In the Battle of Verdun, a German unit captures Fort Douaumont, keystone of the French defences, without a fight.
- 1918 – World War I: German forces capture Tallinn to virtually complete the occupation of Estonia.
- 1921 – Georgian capital Tbilisi falls to the invading Russian forces after heavy fighting and the Russians declare the Georgian Soviet Socialist Republic.
- 1932 – Adolf Hitler, having been stateless for seven years, obtains German citizenship when he is appointed a Brunswick state official by Dietrich Klagges, a fellow Nazi. As a result, Hitler is able to run for Reichspräsident in the 1932 election.
- 1933 – Launch of the USS Ranger at Newport News, Virginia. It is the first purpose-built aircraft carrier to be commissioned by the US Navy.
- 1939 – As part of British air raid precautions, the first of 2.5 million Anderson shelters is constructed in a garden in Islington, north London.
- 1941 – The outlawed Communist Party of the Netherlands organises a general strike in German-occupied Amsterdam to protest against Nazi persecution of Dutch Jews.
- 1947 – The formal abolition of Prussia is proclaimed by the Allied Control Council, the Prussian government having already been abolished by the Preußenschlag of 1932.
- 1947 – Soviet NKVD forces in Hungary abduct Béla Kovács—secretary-general of the majority Independent Smallholders' Party—and deport him to the USSR in defiance of Parliament. His arrest is an important turning point in the Communist takeover of Hungary.
- 1948 – In a coup d'état led by Klement Gottwald, the Communist Party of Czechoslovakia takes control of government in Prague to end the Third Czechoslovak Republic.
- 1951 – The first Pan American Games are officially opened in Buenos Aires by Argentine President Juan Perón.
- 1956 – In his speech On the Cult of Personality and Its Consequences, Nikita Khrushchev, leader of the Soviet Union, denounces Stalin.
- 1980 – The government of Suriname is overthrown by a military coup led by Dési Bouterse.
- 1986 – People Power Revolution: President of the Philippines Ferdinand Marcos flees the nation after 20 years of rule; Corazon Aquino becomes the Philippines' first female president.
- 1991 – Disbandment of the Warsaw Pact at a meeting of its members in Budapest.
- 1994 – American-Israeli extremist Baruch Goldstein commits a mass shooting at the Cave of the Patriarchs mausoleum, leaving 29 dead and over 100 injured before he is disarmed and beaten to death by survivors.
- 1999 – Alitalia Flight 1553 crashes at Genoa Cristoforo Colombo Airport in Genoa, Italy, killing four.
- 2009 – Soldiers of the Bangladesh Rifles mutiny at their headquarters in Pilkhana, Dhaka, Bangladesh, resulting in 74 deaths, including 57 army officials.
- 2009 – Turkish Airlines Flight 1951 crashes during landing at the Amsterdam Schiphol Airport, Netherlands, primarily due to a faulty radio altimeter, resulting in the death of nine passengers and crew including all three pilots.
- 2015 – At least 310 people are killed in avalanches in northeastern Afghanistan.
- 2016 – Three people are killed and fourteen others injured in a series of shootings in the small Kansas cities of Newton and Hesston.
- 2026 – Four people are killed and several more are injured when Cuban Border Guard Troops confront and open fire on a US-registered speedboat violating Cuban waters.

== Births ==
=== Pre-1600 ===
- 1259 – Infanta Branca of Portugal, daughter of King Afonso III of Portugal and Urraca of Castile (died 1321)
- 1337 – Wenceslaus I, Duke of Luxembourg (died 1383)
- 1475 – Edward Plantagenet, 17th Earl of Warwick, last male member of the House of York (died 1499)
- 1540 – Henry Howard, 1st Earl of Northampton, English aristocrat and courtier (died 1614)
- 1543 – Sharaf Khan Bidlisi, Emir of Bitlis (died 1603)
- 1591 – Friedrich Spee, German poet and author (died 1635)

=== 1601–1900 ===
- 1643 – Ahmed II, Ottoman sultan (died 1695)
- 1663 – Peter Anthony Motteux, French-English author, playwright and translator (died 1718)
- 1670 – Maria Margarethe Kirch, German astronomer and mathematician (died 1720)
- 1682 – Giovanni Battista Morgagni, Italian anatomist and pathologist (died 1771)
- 1707 – Carlo Goldoni, Italian playwright and composer (died 1793)
- 1714 – René Nicolas Charles Augustin de Maupeou, French lawyer and politician, Lord Chancellor of France (died 1792)
- 1728 – John Wood, the Younger, English architect, designed the Royal Crescent (died 1782)
- 1752 – John Graves Simcoe, English-Canadian general and politician, 1st Lieutenant Governor of Upper Canada (died 1806)
- 1755 – François René Mallarmé, French lawyer and politician (died 1835)
- 1778 – José de San Martín, Argentinian general and politician, 1st President of Peru (died 1850)
- 1806 – Emma Catherine Embury, American author and poet (died 1863)
- 1809 – John Hart, English-Australian politician, 10th Premier of South Australia (died 1873)
- 1812 – Carl Christian Hall, Danish lawyer and politician, 6th Prime Minister of Denmark (died 1888)
- 1816 – Giovanni Morelli, Italian historian and critic (died 1891)
- 1833 – John St. John, American lawyer and politician, 8th Governor of Kansas (died 1916)
- 1841 – Pierre-Auguste Renoir, French painter and sculptor (died 1919)
- 1842 – Karl May, German author, poet, and playwright (died 1912)
- 1845 – George Reid, Scottish-Australian lawyer and politician, 4th Prime Minister of Australia (died 1918)
- 1855 – Cesário Verde, Portuguese poet and author (died 1886)
- 1856 – Karl Gotthard Lamprecht, German historian and academic (died 1915)
- 1856 – Mathias Zdarsky, Czech-Austrian skier, painter, and sculptor (died 1940)
- 1857 – Robert Bond, Canadian politician; first Prime Minister of Newfoundland (died 1927)
- 1860 – William Ashley, English historian and academic (died 1927)
- 1865 – Andranik, Armenian general (died 1927)
- 1866 – Benedetto Croce, Italian philosopher and politician (died 1952)
- 1869 – Phoebus Levene, Russian-American biochemist and physician (died 1940)
- 1871 – Lesya Ukrainka, Ukrainian poet and playwright (died1913)
- 1873 – Enrico Caruso, Italian-American tenor; the most popular operatic tenor of the early 20th century and the first great recording star. (died 1921)
- 1877 – Erich von Hornbostel, Austrian musicologist and scholar (died 1935)
- 1881 – William Z. Foster, American union leader and politician (died 1961)
- 1881 – Alexei Rykov, Russian politician, Premier of Russia (died 1938)
- 1883 – Princess Alice, Countess of Athlone (died 1981)
- 1885 – Princess Alice of Battenberg, mother of Prince Philip, Duke of Edinburgh (died 1969)
- 1888 – John Foster Dulles, American soldier, lawyer, and politician, 52nd United States Secretary of State (died 1959)
- 1890 – Myra Hess, English pianist and educator (died 1965)
- 1894 – Meher Baba, Indian spiritual master (died 1969)
- 1896 – Ida Noddack, German chemist and physicist (died 1978)
- 1898 – William Astbury, physicist and molecular biologist (died 1961)

=== 1901–present ===
- 1901 – Vince Gair, Australian politician, 27th Premier of Queensland (died 1980)
- 1901 – Zeppo Marx, American comedian and theatrical agent (died 1979)
- 1903 – King Clancy, Canadian ice hockey player, referee, and coach (died 1986)
- 1905 – Perry Miller, American historian, author, and academic (died 1963)
- 1906 – Mary Coyle Chase, American journalist and playwright (died 1981)
- 1907 – Sabahattin Ali, Turkish journalist, author, and poet (died 1948)
- 1908 – Mary Locke Petermann, American cellular biochemist (died 1975)
- 1908 – Frank G. Slaughter, American physician and author (died 2001)
- 1910 – Millicent Fenwick, American journalist and politician (died 1992)
- 1913 – Jim Backus, American actor and screenwriter (died 1989)
- 1913 – Gert Fröbe, German actor (died 1988)
- 1915 – S. Rajaratnam, Singaporean politician, 1st Senior Minister of Singapore (died 2006)
- 1917 – Anthony Burgess, English author, playwright, and critic (died 1993)
- 1918 – Bobby Riggs, American tennis player (died 1995)
- 1919 – Monte Irvin, American baseball player and executive (died 2016)
- 1920 – Philip Habib, American academic and diplomat, Assistant Secretary of State for East Asian and Pacific Affairs (died 1992)
- 1921 – Pierre Laporte, Canadian journalist, lawyer, and politician, Deputy Premier of Quebec (died 1970)
- 1921 – Andy Pafko, American baseball player and manager (died 2013)
- 1922 – Molly Reilly, Canadian aviator (died 1980)
- 1924 – Hugh Huxley, English-American biologist and academic (died 2013)
- 1925 – Lisa Kirk, American actress and singer (died 1990)
- 1925 – Shehu Shagari, Nigerian politician, 6th President of Nigeria (died 2018)
- 1926 – Masatoshi Gündüz Ikeda, Japanese-Turkish mathematician and academic (died 2003)
- 1927 – Ralph Stanley, American singer and banjo player (died 2016)
- 1928 – Paul Elvstrøm, Danish yachtsman (died 2016)
- 1928 – Larry Gelbart, American author and screenwriter (died 2009)
- 1928 – A. Leon Higginbotham, Jr., American civil rights advocate, historian, and judge (died 1998)
- 1928 – Richard G. Stern, American author and academic (died 2013)
- 1930 – Wendy Beckett, British nun and art critic (died 2018)
- 1932 – Tony Brooks, English racing driver (died 2022)
- 1932 – Faron Young, American country music singer-songwriter and guitarist (died 1996)
- 1934 – Tony Lema, American golfer (died 1966)
- 1935 – Tony Campolo, American sociologist and pastor (died 2024)
- 1935 – Oktay Sinanoglu, Turkish physical chemist and molecular biophysicist (died 2015)
- 1937 – Tom Courtenay, English actor
- 1937 – Bob Schieffer, American political author, journalist and TV interviewer
- 1938 – Diane Baker, American actress and producer
- 1938 – Herb Elliott, Australian athlete
- 1938 – Farokh Engineer, Indian cricketer
- 1940 – Ron Santo, American baseball player and sportscaster (died 2010)
- 1941 – David Puttnam, English film producer and academic
- 1942 – Karen Grassle, American actress
- 1943 – George Harrison, English singer-songwriter, guitarist and film producer (died 2001)
- 1943 — Asa Hoffman, Chess player (FIDE Master) and Chess teacher
- 1944 – François Cevert, French racing driver (died 1973)
- 1946 – Jean Todt, French racing driver and team manager
- 1947 – Lee Evans, American sprinter and athletics coach (died 2021)
- 1949 – Ric Flair, American professional wrestler
- 1949 – Amin Maalouf, Lebanese-French journalist and author
- 1950 – Francisco Fernández Ochoa, Spanish skier (died 2006)
- 1950 – Neil Jordan, Irish film director, screenwriter and author
- 1950 – Néstor Kirchner, Argentine politician; 51st President of Argentina (died 2010)
- 1951 – Don Quarrie, Jamaican sprinter and coach
- 1952 – Joey Dunlop, Northern Irish motorcyclist (died 2000)
- 1953 – José María Aznar, Spanish politician; Prime Minister of Spain, 1996–2004
- 1953 – John Doe, American musician, singer-songwriter, actor, and poet
- 1957 – Raymond McCreesh, Irish Republican died on hunger strike (died 1981)
- 1957 – Tharman Shanmugaratnam, Singaporean economist and politician; 5th Senior Minister and 9th President of Singapore
- 1958 – Kurt Rambis, American basketball player, coach, and executive
- 1962 – Birgit Fischer, German kayaker
- 1963 – Paul O'Neill, American baseball player and sportscaster
- 1965 – Carrot Top, American comedian
- 1965 – Veronica Webb, American model, actress, and writer
- 1966 – Alexis Denisof, American actor
- 1966 – Téa Leoni, American actress
- 1967 – Ed Balls, English politician; Shadow Chancellor of the Exchequer
- 1968 – Lesley Boone, American actress and producer
- 1968 – Danny Crnkovich, Australian rugby league player
- 1968 – Oumou Sangaré, Malian musician
- 1970 – Chris Barnes, American bowler and sportscaster
- 1971 – Sean Astin, American actor, director and producer
- 1971 – Stuart MacGill, Australian cricketer
- 1971 – Daniel Powter, Canadian singer-songwriter and musician
- 1973 – Anson Mount, American actor
- 1974 – Dominic Raab, English politician; First Secretary of State and Secretary of State for Foreign and Commonwealth Affairs
- 1975 – Chelsea Handler, American comedian, actress, author, and television host
- 1976 – Rashida Jones, American actress and writer
- 1976 – Samaki Walker, American basketball player
- 1979 – Napoleon Harris, American football player and politician
- 1980 – Kash Patel, American lawyer, former federal prosecutor and official
- 1981 – Park Ji-sung, South Korean footballer
- 1982 – Maria Kanellis, American professional wrestler, actress, and model
- 1982 – Flavia Pennetta, Italian tennis player
- 1982 – Anton Volchenkov, Russian ice hockey player
- 1985 – Joakim Noah, French-American basketball player
- 1986 – Justin Berfield, American actor, writer, and producer
- 1986 – Jameela Jamil, English actress and presenter
- 1986 – James Phelps, English actor
- 1986 – Oliver Phelps, English actor
- 1987 – Justin Abdelkader, American ice hockey player
- 1988 – Tom Marshall, English photo colouriser and artist
- 1988 – Gerald McCoy, American football player
- 1989 – Jimmer Fredette, American basketball player
- 1989 – Kana Hanazawa, Japanese voice actress and singer
- 1989 – E'Twaun Moore, American basketball player
- 1990 – Félix Peña, Dominican baseball player
- 1992 – Joakim Nordström, Swedish ice hockey player
- 1992 – Jorge Soler, Cuban baseball player
- 1993 – Erick Fedde, American baseball player
- 1993 – Lukáš Sedlák, Czech ice hockey player
- 1994 – Fred VanVleet, American basketball player
- 1995 – Mario Hezonja, Croatian basketball player
- 1995 – Viktoriya Tomova, Bulgarian tennis player
- 1997 – Isabelle Fuhrman, American actress
- 1997 – Thon Maker, South Sudanese-Australian basketball player
- 1997 – Brock Boeser, American ice hockey player
- 1999 – Gianluigi Donnarumma, Italian footballer
- 1999 – Matvey Safonov, Russian footballer
- 1999 – Rocky, South Korean singer, dancer and songwriter
- 2000 – Bo Nix, American football player
- 2001 – Vernon Carey Jr., American basketball player
- 2003 – Brandin Podziemski, American basketball player
- 2004 – Tyler Sanders, American actor (died 2022)
- 2005 – Noah Jupe, English actor

== Deaths ==
=== Pre-1600 ===
- 806 – Tarasios, patriarch of Constantinople
- 891 – Fujiwara no Mototsune, Japanese regent (born 836)
- 1099 – Anselm of Ribemont, Frankish nobleman and participant of the First Crusade
- 1522 – William Lily, English scholar and educator (born 1468)
- 1536 – Berchtold Haller, German-Swiss theologian and reformer (born 1492)
- 1547 – Vittoria Colonna, marchioness of Pescara (born 1490)

=== 1601–1900 ===
- 1601 – Robert Devereux, 2nd Earl of Essex, English general and politician, Lord Lieutenant of Ireland (born 1566)
- 1634 – Albrecht von Wallenstein, Austrian general and politician (born 1583)
- 1636 – Santorio Santorio, Italian biologist (born 1561)
- 1655 – Daniël Heinsius, Flemish poet and scholar (born 1580)
- 1682 – Alessandro Stradella, Italian composer (born 1639)
- 1710 – Daniel Greysolon, Sieur du Lhut, French soldier and explorer (born 1639)
- 1713 – Frederick I of Prussia (born 1657)
- 1723 – Christopher Wren, English architect, designed St Paul's Cathedral (born 1632)
- 1756 – Eliza Haywood, English actress and poet (born 1693)
- 1796 – Samuel Seabury, American bishop (born 1729)
- 1805 – Thomas Pownall, English politician, Governor of the Province of Massachusetts Bay (born 1722)
- 1819 – Francisco Manoel de Nascimento, Portuguese-French poet and educator (born 1734)
- 1822 – William Pinkney, American politician and diplomat, 7th United States Attorney General (born 1764)
- 1841 – Philip P. Barbour, American lawyer, judge, and politician, 12th Speaker of the United States House of Representatives (born 1783)
- 1850 – Daoguang Emperor of China (born 1782)
- 1852 – Thomas Moore, Irish poet and lyricist (born 1779)
- 1865 – Otto Ludwig, German author, playwright, and critic (born 1813)
- 1870 – Henrik Hertz, Danish poet and playwright (born 1797)
- 1877 – Jung Bahadur Rana, Nepalese ruler (born 1816)
- 1878 – Townsend Harris, American merchant, politician, and diplomat, United States Ambassador to Japan (born 1804)
- 1899 – Paul Reuter, German-English journalist and businessman, founded Reuters (born 1816)

=== 1901–present ===
- 1906 – Anton Arensky, Russian pianist and composer (born 1861)
- 1910 – Worthington Whittredge, American painter and educator (born 1820)
- 1911 – Friedrich Spielhagen, German author, theorist, and translator (born 1829)
- 1912 – William IV, Grand Duke of Luxembourg (born 1852)
- 1914 – John Tenniel, English illustrator (born 1820)
- 1915 – Charles Edwin Bessey, American botanist, author, and academic (born 1845)
- 1920 – Marcel-Auguste Dieulafoy, French archaeologist and engineer (born 1844)
- 1928 – William O'Brien, Irish journalist and politician (born 1852)
- 1934 – Elizabeth Gertrude Britton, American botanist and academic (born 1857)
- 1934 – John McGraw, American baseball player and manager (born 1873)
- 1945 – Mário de Andrade, Brazilian author, poet, and photographer (born 1893)
- 1950 – George Minot, American physician and academic, Nobel Prize laureate (born 1885)
- 1953 – Sergei Winogradsky, Ukrainian-Russian microbiologist and ecologist (born 1856)
- 1954 – Joseph Beech, American Methodist missionary and educator (born 1867)
- 1957 – Mark Aldanov, Russian author and critic (born 1888)
- 1957 – Bugs Moran, American mob boss (born 1893)
- 1963 – Melville J. Herskovits, American anthropologist and academic (born 1895)
- 1964 – Alexander Archipenko, Ukrainian sculptor and illustrator (born 1887)
- 1964 – Grace Metalious, American author (born 1924)
- 1970 – Mark Rothko, Latvian-American painter and academic (born 1903)
- 1971 – Theodor Svedberg, Swedish chemist and academic, Nobel Prize laureate (born 1884)
- 1972 – Gottfried Fuchs, German-Canadian Olympic soccer player (born 1889)
- 1975 – Elijah Muhammad, American religious leader (born 1897)
- 1978 – Daniel James, Jr., American general and pilot (born 1920)
- 1980 – Robert Hayden, American poet and academic (born 1913)
- 1983 – Tennessee Williams, American playwright, and poet (born 1911)
- 1996 – Haing S. Ngor, Cambodian-American physician and author (born 1940)
- 1997 – Andrei Sinyavsky, Russian journalist and publisher (born 1925)
- 1998 – W. O. Mitchell, Canadian author and playwright (born 1914)
- 1999 – Glenn T. Seaborg, American chemist and academic, Nobel Prize laureate (born 1912)
- 2001 – A. R. Ammons, American poet and critic (born 1926)
- 2001 – Don Bradman, Australian international cricketer; holder of world record batting average (born 1908)
- 2005 – Peter Benenson, English lawyer, founded Amnesty International (born 1921)
- 2008 – Hans Raj Khanna, Indian judge and advocate; upholder of civil liberties (born 1912)
- 2010 – Ihsan Dogramaci, Turkish pediatrician and academic (born 1915)
- 2012 – Louisiana Red, American singer-songwriter and guitarist (born 1932)
- 2015 – Harve Bennett, American screenwriter and producer (born 1930)
- 2015 – Ariel Camacho, Mexican musician and singer-songwriter; (born 1992)
- 2015 – Eugenie Clark, American biologist and academic; noted ichthyologist (born 1922)
- 2017 – Bill Paxton, American actor and filmmaker (born 1955)
- 2020 – Dmitry Yazov, last Marshal of the Soviet Union (born 1924)
- 2022 – Farrah Forke, American actress (born 1968)
- 2022 – Shirley Hughes, English author and illustrator (born 1927)
- 2023 – Gordon Pinsent, Canadian actor, director and screenwriter (born 1930)
- 2025 – Henry Kelly, Irish radio and television broadcaster, actor and journalist (born 1947)
- 2025 – Roberto Orci, Mexican-American screenwriter and producer (born 1973)
- 2025 – Jane Reed, UK Magazine editor and media executive (born 1940)

== Holidays and observances ==
- Christian feast days:
  - Æthelberht of Kent
  - Blessed Ciriaco María Sancha y Hervás
  - Gerland of Agrigento
  - John Roberts, writer and missionary (Anglican Communion)
  - Hamburg Matthiae-mahl, feast of Hanseatic League cities on the mediaeval first day of spring
  - Blessed Maria Adeodata Pisani
  - Blessed Robert of Arbrissel, founder of Fontevraud Abbey
  - Saint Walpurga (she was canonised on 1 May c. 870 and Walpurgis Night is celebrated 30 April)
  - February 25 (Eastern Orthodox liturgics)
- Kitano Baika-sai or "Plum Blossom Festival" (Kitano Tenman-gu Shrine, Kyoto, Japan)
- Memorial Day for the Victims of the Communist Dictatorships (Hungary)
- National Day (Kuwait)
- People Power Day (Philippines)
- Revolution Day in Suriname
- Soviet Occupation Day (Georgia)
