= Avianova =

Avianova may refer to:

- Avianova (Italy), a defunct Italian airline
- Avianova (Russia), a defunct Russian airline
