= Minerva Airlines Flight 1553 =

1999 aviation accident in Italy

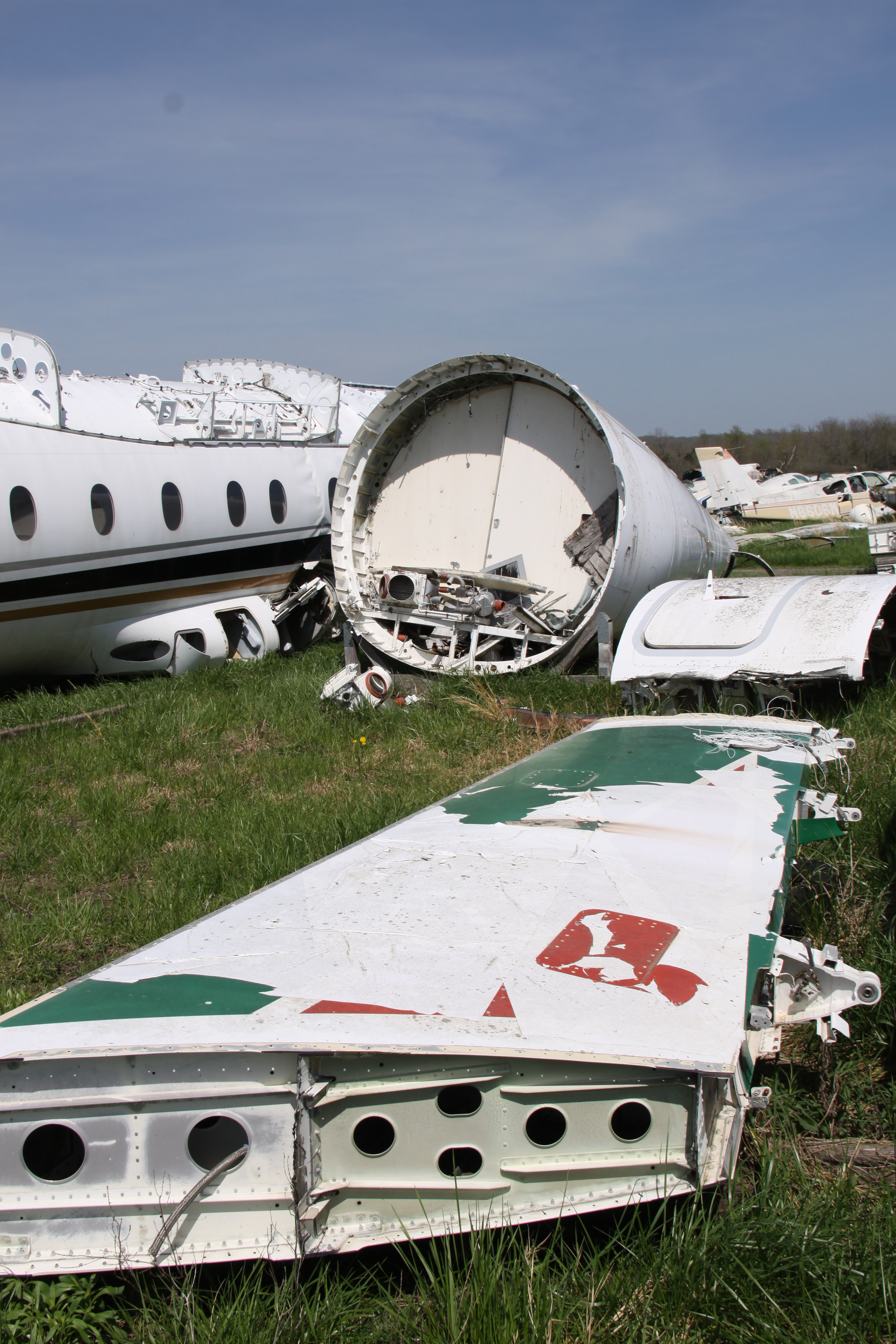
- The scrapped remains of the aircraft

Accident
- Date: 25 February 1999
- Summary: Runway overrun on landing
- Site: Genoa Cristoforo Colombo Airport, Genoa, Italy; 44.4141°N 8.8246°E

Aircraft
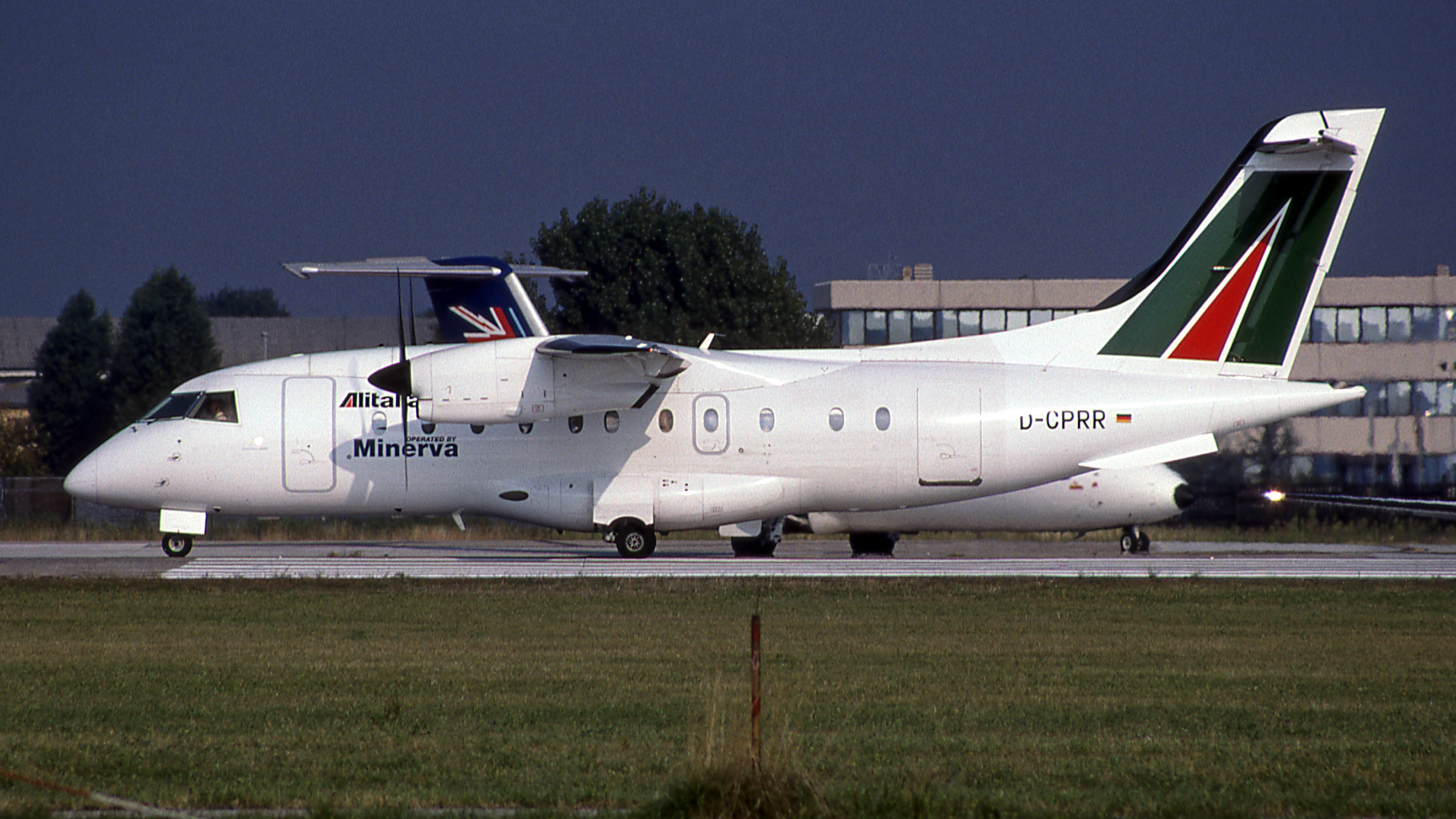
- D-CPRR, the aircraft involved in the accident, seen in 1998
- Aircraft type: Dornier 328-110
- Operator: Minerva Airlines on behalf of Alitalia Express
- IATA flight No.: AZ1553
- ICAO flight No.: AZA1553
- Call sign: ALITALIA 1553
- Registration: D-CPRR
- Flight origin: Cagliari Elmas Airport, Cagliari, Italy
- Destination: Genoa Cristoforo Colombo Airport, Genoa, Italy
- Occupants: 31
- Passengers: 27
- Crew: 4
- Fatalities: 4
- Survivors: 27

Minerva Airlines Flight 1553, was a regularly scheduled commercial passenger flight from Cagliari to Genoa operated by Minerva Airlines under the Alitalia Express brand via a codeshare agreement with Alitalia. On 25 February 1999, the Dornier 328 serving the flight lost control and overran the runway while landing at Genoa Cristoforo Colombo Airport. Of the 31 occupants on board, three died, including the flight attendant; another passenger later died in hospital. The aircraft was damaged beyond repair.

== Flight history ==
Flight 1553 departed Cagliari for an 85-minute flight to Genoa on 25 February 1999, operated by Minerva Airlines on behalf of Alitalia, with a crew of four on board. The aircraft was under the command of 35-year-old Captain Alessandro Del Bono, an experienced pilot with 6,000 flight hours, 2,000 of which were on the Dornier 328. Also in the cockpit were First Officer Walter Beneduce and a student pilot. In the cabin, there was one flight attendant.

== Accident ==
The aircraft approached and touched down on runway 29 at Genoa Airport with a 15- to 18-knot tailwind at approximately 11:30 am UTC (12:30 pm local time). Eyewitnesses reported seeing the aircraft touch down very far down the runway, bouncing several times, then veering right, crashing into the retaining wall and collapsing the front landing gear before plunging into the nearby sea. Airport crash response crews were quickly contacted and arrived on site after just 70 seconds.

There were three immediate deaths—two passengers and the flight attendant—along with eleven injured. Most passengers were taken to the hospital with hypothermia, with one passenger later dying in the hospital, bringing the fatality count to four. It is believed that the number of deaths would have been far greater had a 15-year-old member of a swim team not rushed to open the emergency exit door.

== Investigation ==
Despite the fact that the accident occurred on the same day that the Italian Parliament voted to create the National Agency for the Safety of Flight (ANSV, Italian: Agenzia Nazionale per la Sicurezza del Volo), the Italian Air Safety Board, the ANSV did not investigate this accident as they had not commenced operations yet. Instead, the Italian Civil Aviation Authority launched an inquiry into the accident. Captain Del Bono was stripped of his pilot's license and sentenced to two years and eight months in prison for negligent homicide, with two court-appointed experts stating: "Pilot error was the predominant factor. The captain landed faster than expected, did not effectively counter the crosswind, and failed to select [the braking and control systems of the aircraft during the landing phase]." Moreover, he "did not understand that the poor deceleration of the aircraft was not due to mechanical failures, but due to poor control of the aircraft and its systems". In 2002 an appeal was made to the results, claiming that the aircraft's thrust reversers were jammed on landing and that the aircraft had veered right because Captain Del Bono had shut off power to the right engine in an attempt to slow the plane down. In 2003, Del Bono's sentence was reduced from two years and eight months in prison to two years on probation. Del Bono's defense cited the Civil Aviation Authority's final report, which found that the thrust reversers were not functioning and that pilot error could be excluded as a cause.

== Aftermath ==
The Dornier 328 was damaged beyond repair. Minerva Airlines ceased operations four years later, in 2003.
