= C.A.I. First =

Regional airline of Italy (1997–2015)

IATA	ICAO	Call sign
XM	SMX	ALIEXPRESS
- Founded: 1 October 1997
- Ceased operations: 6 February 2015 (integrated into Alitalia)
- Operating bases: Milan–Linate; Milan–Malpensa (1998–2008); Rome–Fiumicino
- Frequent-flyer program: MilleMiglia
- Alliance: SkyTeam (affiliate; 2001–2015)
- Parent company: Alitalia
- Headquarters: Fiumicino, Rome, Italy

C.A.I. First S.p.A. was an Italian airline operating flights for its parent company, Alitalia, to preserve slots at Milan Linate Airport. For this reason Alitalia when merged with Air One didn't close C.A.I. First, which at that time still operated as Alitalia Express. It used to have bases at Leonardo da Vinci-Fiumicino Airport in Rome and Malpensa Airport in Milan. C.A.I. First was dissolved and merged into Alitalia mainline by February 2015.

The name C.A.I. First was only a legal name and was not used in public; all of its flights were branded as Alitalia.

== History ==
=== Early years ===
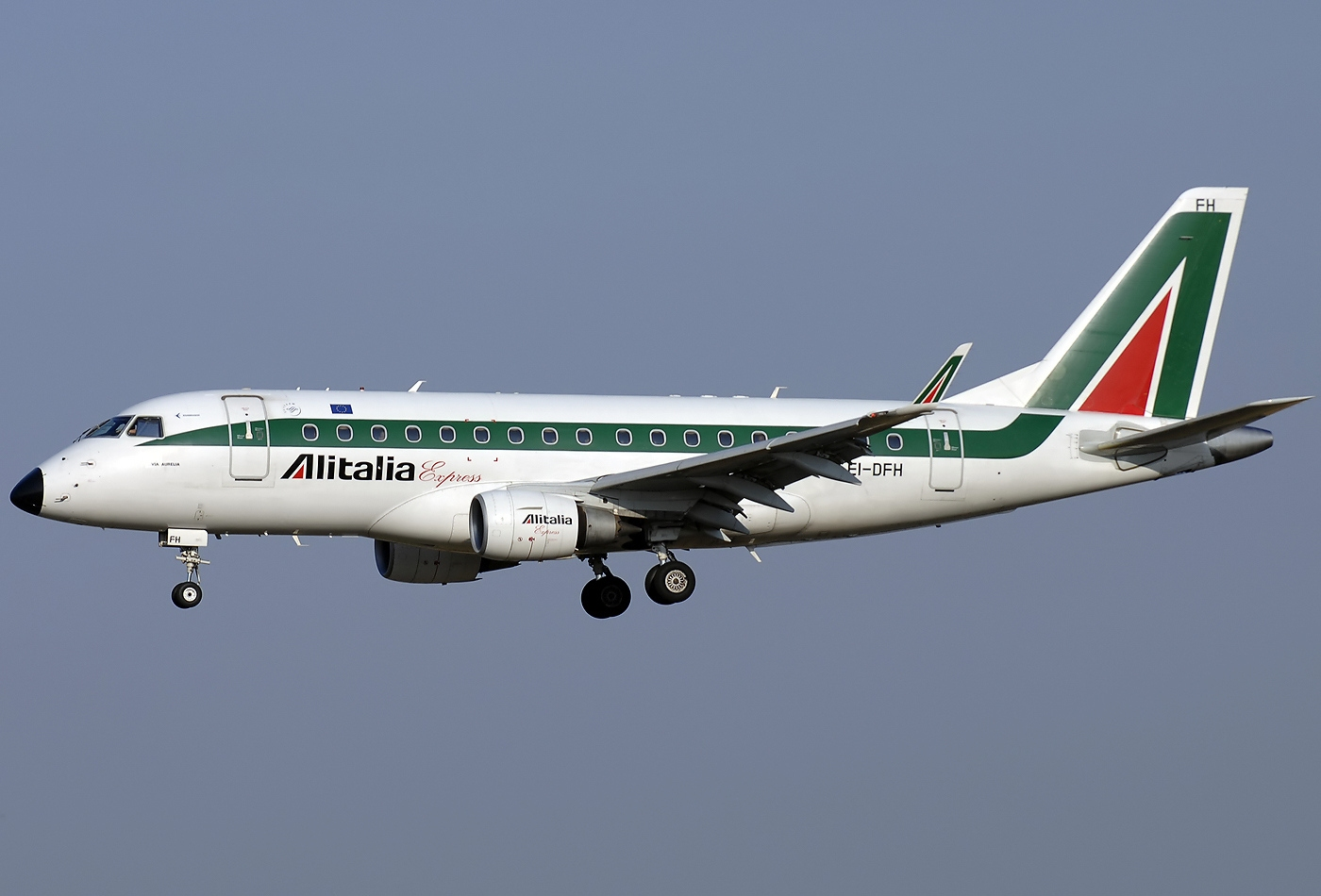
Alitalia Express Embraer 170

The airline was established as a subsidiary of Alitalia and started operations on 1 October 1997. It was founded from the defunct Avianova. It was announced that Minerva Airlines would be acquired by Alitalia in March 2003 and that Alitalia Express's fleet would be transferred, but the plan did not go through.

=== Air One and Alitalia merger ===
In December 2008, Compagnia Aerea Italiana (C.A.I.) took over Alitalia - Linee Aeree Italiane and Air One, merging the two companies together to create the "new Alitalia". With the take over, CAI also received Alitalia Express and Air One CityLiner. The Alitalia Express brand has been phased out and the regional arm of Alitalia is now Alitalia CityLiner by rebranding Air One CityLiner.

The last fleet of Alitalia Express, 10 Embraer 170, was completely phased out by March 2013. Only one Airbus A320-200 (EI-DSC) from mainline Alitalia was moved in the fleet to preserve the slots. The same solution had been used with C.A.I. Second, which used to be Volareweb.com.

On 6 February 2015, the airline was dissolved and its operations integrated into Alitalia mainline.

== Fleet ==
Prior to its shutdown in February 2015, the fleet consisted of the following aircraft:

C.A.I. First fleet
Aircraft	In Fleet	Passengers			
Aircraft	In Fleet	J	Y+	Y	Total
Airbus A320-200	1	34	—	114	148
Total	1				

=== Fleet history ===
Over the years, Alitalia Express has operated the following aircraft types:

Alitalia Express historical fleet
Aircraft	Image	Introduced	Retired	Total
ATR 42-300		1996	2007	9
ATR 72-212		1996	2008	5
ATR 72-500		1999	2008	6
Embraer ERJ 145LR		2000	2008	14
Embraer 170		2004	2012	6
Dornier 328		2000	2004	10 operated by Minerva Airlines

== See also ==
- List of defunct airlines of Italy
