= List of ITA Airways destinations =

ITA Airways commenced its operations on 15 October 2021, initially serving 44 destinations with plans to grow the number to 74 by 2025.

== Destinations ==
This list of ITA Airways destinations includes the city, country, and airport's name.

Country	City	Airport	Notes	Refs
Albania	Tirana	Tirana International Airport Nënë Tereza	Seasonal	
Algeria	Algiers	Houari Boumediene Airport		
Argentina	Buenos Aires	Ministro Pistarini International Airport		
Belgium	Brussels	Brussels Airport		
Brazil	Rio de Janeiro	Rio de Janeiro/Galeão International Airport		
Brazil	São Paulo	São Paulo/Guarulhos International Airport		
Bulgaria	Sofia	Vasil Levski Sofia Airport	Terminated	
Canada	Toronto	Toronto Pearson International Airport	Seasonal	
Dominican Republic	Santo Domingo	Las Américas International Airport	Seasonal; Begins 30 November 2026	
Egypt	Cairo	Cairo International Airport		
Egypt	Hurghada	Hurghada International Airport	Seasonal charter	
Egypt	Sharm El Sheikh	Sharm El Sheikh International Airport	Seasonal charter	
France	Marseille	Marseille Provence Airport	Seasonal	
France	Nice	Nice Côte d'Azur Airport		
France	Paris	Charles de Gaulle Airport		
France	Paris	Orly Airport		
Germany	Düsseldorf	Düsseldorf Airport	Terminated	
Germany	Frankfurt	Frankfurt Airport		
Germany	Hamburg	Hamburg Airport	Seasonal	
Germany	Munich	Munich Airport		
Germany	Rostock	Rostock–Laage Airport	Seasonal charter	
Germany	Stuttgart	Stuttgart Airport	Terminated	
Ghana	Accra	Accra International Airport		
Greece	Athens	Athens International Airport		
Greece	Corfu	Corfu International Airport	Seasonal	
Greece	Heraklion	Heraklion International Airport	Seasonal	
Greece	Kefalonia	Kefalonia International Airport	Seasonal	
Greece	Mykonos	Mykonos Airport	Seasonal	
Greece	Rhodes	Rhodes International Airport	Seasonal	
Greece	Thessaloniki	Thessaloniki Airport	Seasonal	
Greece	Zakynthos	Zakynthos International Airport	Seasonal	
India	New Delhi	Indira Gandhi International Airport		
Israel	Tel Aviv	Ben Gurion Airport		
Italy	Alghero	Alghero–Fertilia Airport		
Italy	Brindisi	Brindisi Airport		
Italy	Bologna	Bologna Guglielmo Marconi Airport		
Italy	Bari	Bari Karol Wojtyła Airport		
Italy	Cagliari	Cagliari Elmas Airport	Terminated	
Italy	Catania	Catania–Fontanarossa Airport		
Italy	Florence	Florence Airport		
Italy	Genoa	Genoa Cristoforo Colombo Airport		
Italy	Lamezia Terme	Lamezia Terme International Airport		
Italy	Lampedusa	Lampedusa Airport	Seasonal	
Italy	Milan	Linate Airport	Focus city	
Italy	Milan	Milan Malpensa Airport	Terminated	
Italy	Naples	Naples International Airport		
Italy	Olbia	Olbia Costa Smeralda Airport	Seasonal	
Italy	Palermo	Palermo Airport		
Italy	Pantelleria	Pantelleria Airport	Seasonal	
Italy	Pescara	Abruzzo Airport	Terminated	
Italy	Reggio Calabria	Reggio Calabria Airport		
Italy	Rome	Rome Fiumicino Airport	Hub	
Italy	Trapani	Trapani–Birgi Airport	Seasonal	
Italy	Trieste	Trieste Airport		
Italy	Turin	Turin Airport		
Italy	Venice	Venice Marco Polo Airport		
Italy	Verona	Verona Villafranca Airport	Resumes 28 March 2027	
Japan	Tokyo	Haneda Airport		
Libya	Tripoli	Mitiga International Airport	Resumes 3 December 2026	
Luxembourg	Luxembourg City	Luxembourg Airport	Terminated	
Maldives	Malé	Velana International Airport	Seasonal	
Malta	Valletta	Malta International Airport	Seasonal	
Martinique	Fort-de-France	Martinique Aimé Césaire International Airport	Seasonal charter	
Mauritius	Port Louis	Sir Seewoosagur Ramgoolam International Airport	Seasonal	
Netherlands	Amsterdam	Amsterdam Airport Schiphol		
Saudi Arabia	Jeddah	King Abdulaziz International Airport	Terminated	
Saudi Arabia	Riyadh	King Khalid International Airport		
Senegal	Dakar	Blaise Diagne International Airport		
Spain	Alicante	Alicante–Elche Miguel Hernández Airport	Seasonal	
Spain	Barcelona	Josep Tarradellas Barcelona–El Prat Airport		
Spain	Ibiza	Ibiza Airport	Seasonal	
Spain	Madrid	Adolfo Suárez Madrid–Barajas Airport		
Spain	Málaga	Málaga Airport	Seasonal	
Spain	Menorca	Menorca Airport	Seasonal	
Spain	Palma de Mallorca	Palma de Mallorca Airport	Seasonal	
Spain	Valencia	Valencia Airport	Seasonal	
Switzerland	Geneva	Geneva Airport		
Switzerland	Zurich	Zurich Airport		
Thailand	Bangkok	Suvarnabhumi Airport		
Tunisia	Tunis	Tunis–Carthage International Airport		
United Arab Emirates	Dubai	Dubai International Airport	Resumes 25 October 2026	
United Kingdom	London	Gatwick Airport	Terminated	
United Kingdom	London	Heathrow Airport		
United Kingdom	London	London City Airport		
United States	Boston	Logan International Airport		
United States	Chicago	O'Hare International Airport	Seasonal	
United States	Houston	George Bush Intercontinental Airport		
United States	Los Angeles	Los Angeles International Airport		
United States	Miami	Miami International Airport		
United States	New York City	John F. Kennedy International Airport		
United States	San Francisco	San Francisco International Airport	Seasonal	
United States	Washington, D.C.	Dulles International Airport	Seasonal	
Venezuela	Caracas	Simon Bolivar International Airport	Begins 30 March 2027	
