= Air One =

Low-cost airline of Italy (1983–2014)

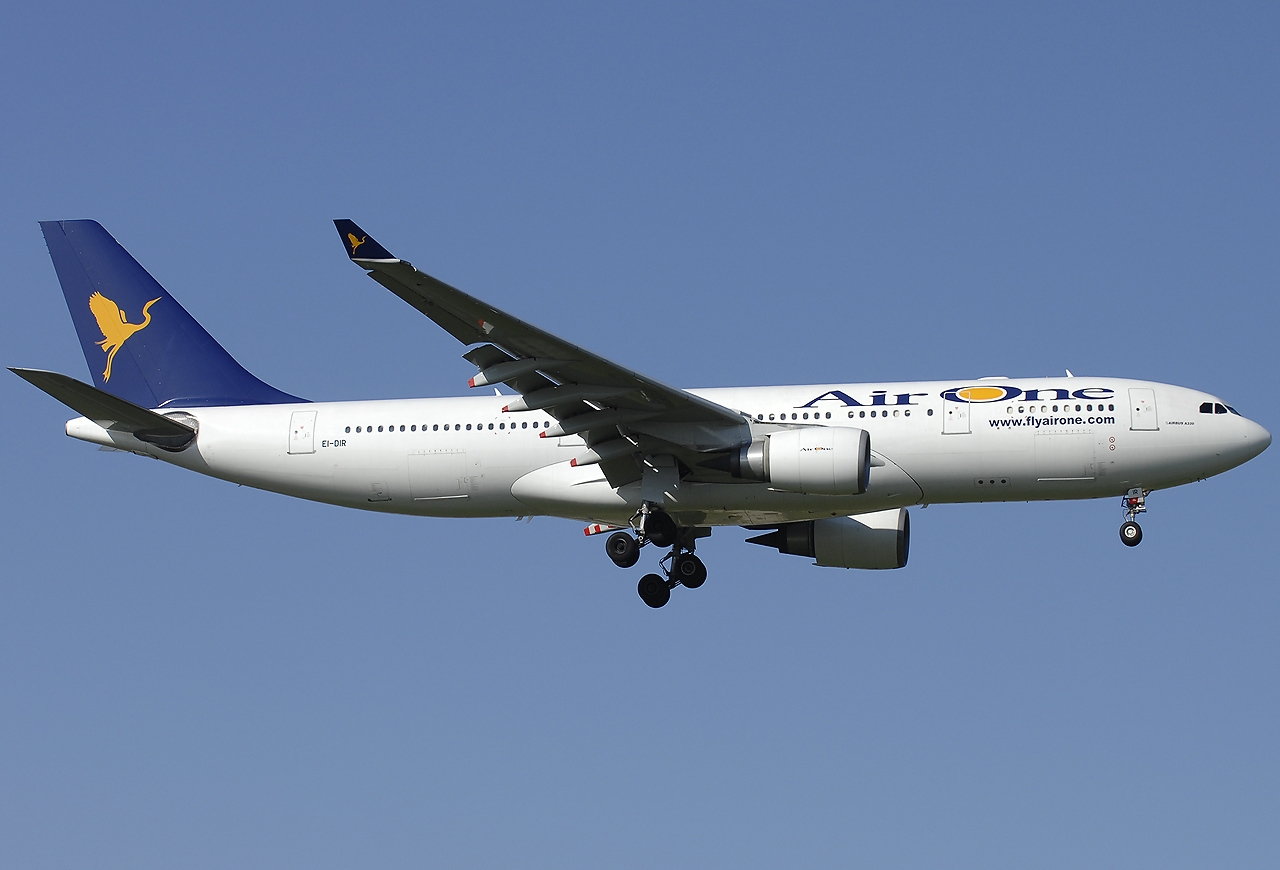
- Airbus A330-200
IATA	ICAO	Call sign
AP	ADH	HERON
- Founded: 1983; 43 years ago
- Ceased operations: 30 October 2014; 11 years ago
- Operating bases: Catania; Milan–Malpensa; Palermo; Pisa; Rome–Fiumicino; Venice; Verona
- Frequent-flyer program: MilleMiglia
- Subsidiaries: Air One CityLiner (2006–2009)
- Parent company: Alitalia
- Headquarters: Fiumicino, Rome, Italy

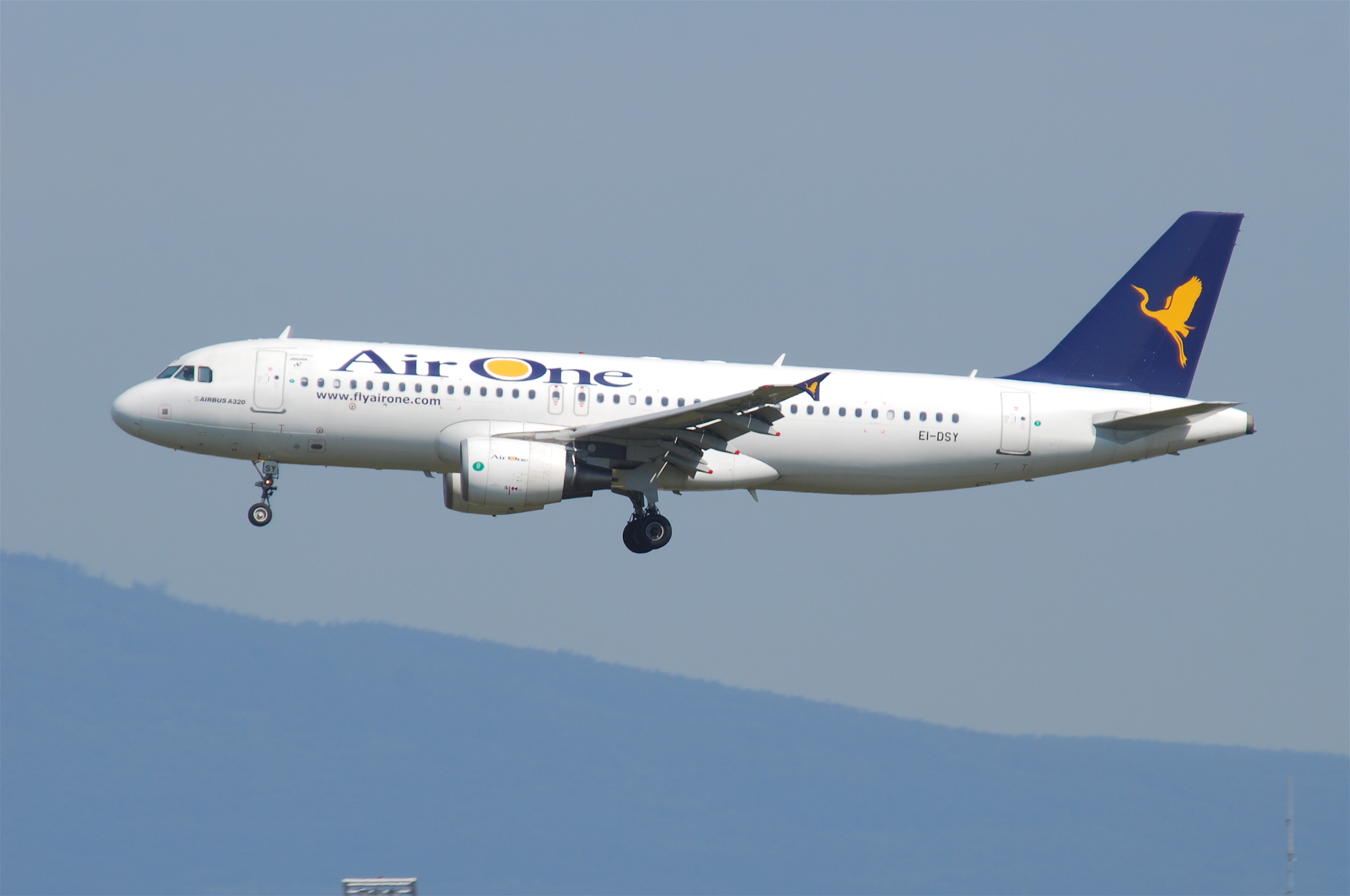
An A320-200 approaching Frankfurt in 2011

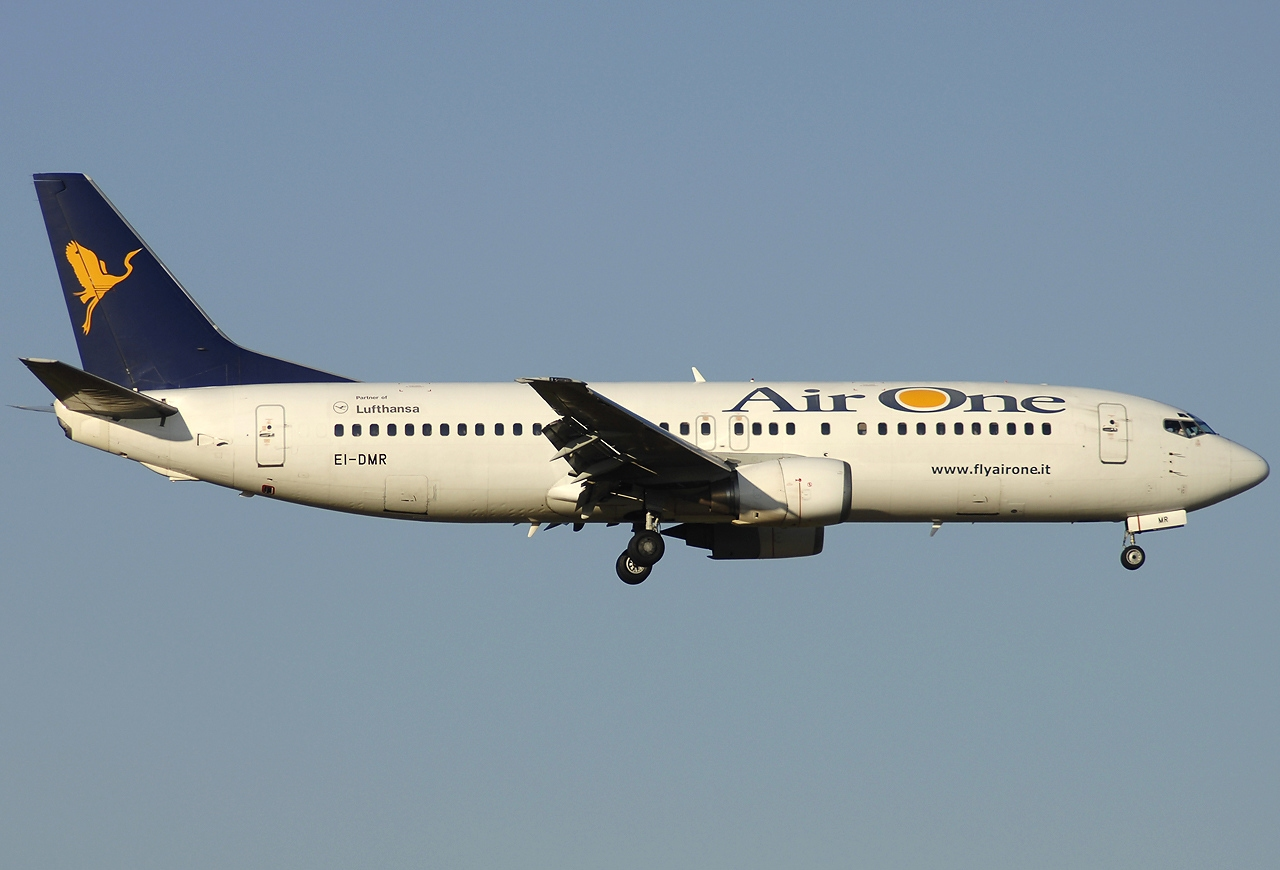
Boeing 737-400

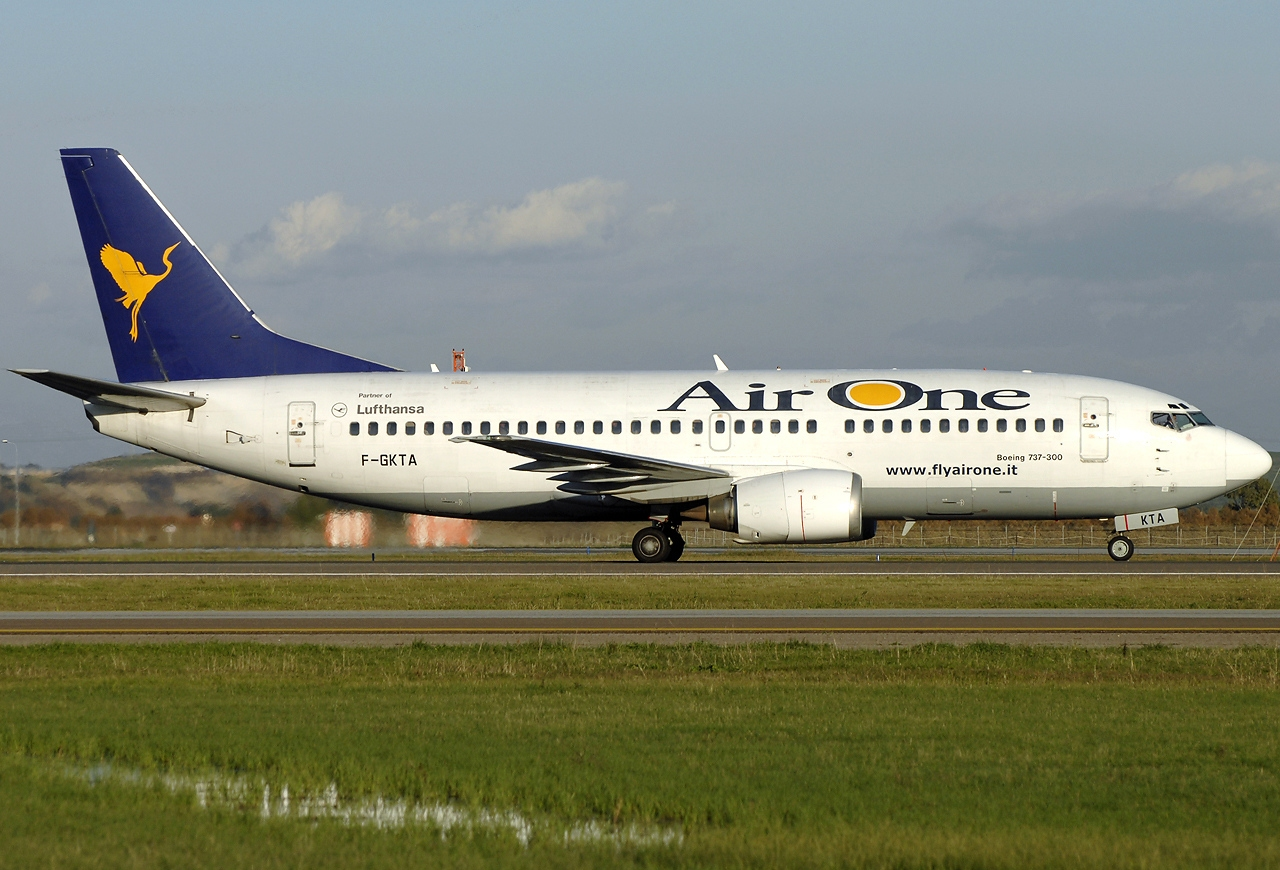
Boeing 737-300

Air One S.p.A. was an Italian low-cost airline which operated as Air One "Smart Carrier". It operated as Alitalia's low-cost subsidiary with operating bases located in Catania, Palermo, Pisa, Venice and Verona; while Tirana was a focus city. "Air One" is a portmanteau of the English meaning Air One and the Italian word 'airone', pronounced IPA [ai'rone], meaning heron (the bird depicted in the airline's logo), which was also the airline's callsign.

Before the merger with Alitalia, Air One was a competitor, the second largest airline in Italy, with a network to 36 destinations in Italy, Europe and North America. Its main bases were Rome Fiumicino Airport, Linate Airport in Milan and Turin Airport.

Air One ceased operations on 30 October 2014 as part of the new concept of its parent company Alitalia based on its new partnership with Etihad Airways. All routes were either cancelled or taken over by Alitalia itself.

== History ==
=== First years ===
On 27 April 1995, still with the name Aliadriatica, began scheduled flights between Milan (Linate) and Brindisi and Reggio Calabria and Lamezia Terme.

In November 1995 the company name was changed to Air One when it started flying between Rome and Milan in direct competition with Alitalia.

By the end of 1999, the company was operating approximately 350 flights a week to seven domestic destinations. Its fleet consisted of 11 Boeing 737s (models 200, 300, and 400), and the company employed approximately 700 people.

In the year 2000, Air One announced a partnership with Lufthansa and nearly all Air One flights became code-shared with Lufthansa.

As of June 2006, regional destinations were served under the name Air One CityLiner with the brand-new fleet of Bombardier CRJ-900s.

In 2007, Air One carried approximately 5.5 million passengers (scheduled and charter), thus becoming the second largest Italian airline in terms of passenger traffic. 2007 revenues totaled EUR750 million with a net profit of EUR6.8 million.

=== Merger with Alitalia ===
In August 2008, it was announced that Air One was to be merged with Alitalia. Air One was almost bankrupt in 2008, and the merger with Alitalia-CAI was the only viable solution to save it.

On 13 January 2009, Air One officially became part of Alitalia, though the two airlines were to be combined into one over time. A detailed integration plan was at that time yet to be announced.

On 28 March 2009, due to the merger with Alitalia, the cooperation between Lufthansa's Miles & More and Air One ended. On 28 June 2009, also due to the Alitalia merger, the partnerships with United Airlines' Mileage Plus program and Air Canada's Aeroplan program ended.

Later in 2009, the Alitalia and Air One booking procedures were unified so that the airlines effectively became the same.

=== Air One "Smart Carrier" - low-cost subsidiary ===
On 28 March 2010, Air One "Smart Carrier" as a separate brand from Alitalia began operating low-cost flights out of Milan Malpensa Airport. Nine domestic and five international destinations were initially served, using five Airbus A320s painted in the Air One livery and formatted to 180 seats.

In its first full quarter of operations, Air One Smart Carrier transported 320,000 passengers, with an on-time performance of 89%.

On 2 February 2011, Air One Smart Carrier announced that, in the summer 2011 season, it would expand its operations at Milan Malpensa and also open a new base at Pisa Airport. The base opened on 1 July 2011. Air One Smart Carrier predicted it would carry 1.6 million passengers in 2011, compared to 0.9 million in 2010, and a new website was also launched.

On 21 December 2011, Air One Smart Carrier announced a new base at Venice Marco Polo Airport, with flights starting in May 2012. On 1 October 2012, operations commenced at Air One Smart Carrier's new base in Catania Fontanarossa Airport, the fourth base. In September 2013 the opening of a fifth base at Palermo Falcone-Borsellino Airport was announced with flights to commence in March 2014. Including a new route to London Gatwick Airport, a destination not served by Air One since the ending of flights from Milan Malpensa Airport.

On 26 October 2013, Air One closed its operating base in Milan Malpensa Airport and announced a new base at Palermo Falcone–Borsellino Airport. The flights from Palermo started in March 2014.

=== Closure ===
On 26 August 2014, it was announced that parent-company Alitalia would shut down Air One by autumn 2014. All remaining routes were terminated by 30 October 2014 with some base operations and routes already closed by 30 September. Some routes, especially within Italy, were taken over by Alitalia itself as well as the former Air One fleet.

== Fleet history ==
Air One operated the following aircraft types over its lifetime:

Air One historical fleet
Aircraft	Total	Introduced	Retired	Notes
ATR 42–300(QC)	1	2006	2008	SP-KEE leased from White Eagle Aviation
Airbus A320-200	30	2006	2008	CS-TQA, CS-TQB leased from Air Luxor; Fleet of 10 aircraft in use when operations ceased
Airbus A330-200	2	2008	2009	
Boeing 737-200	3	1993	2008	1 previously with Aliadriatica
Boeing 737-300	13	1995	2010	1 previously with Aliadriatica
Boeing 737-400	27	1997	2010	
Boeing 737-800	6	2002	2004	
British Aerospace Avro RJ70	2	2006	2009	SE-DJZ, SE-DJX leased from Transwede Airways
Jetstream 31 Airliner	2	1991	1993	Previously with Aliadriatica. I-ALKC, I-ALKD on lease
Fokker 50	1	1991	1993	PH-JXK leased from Denim Air
McDonnell Douglas DC-9-15RC	2	1997	1998	I-TJAN, I-TJAR on lease
McDonnell Douglas MD-83	1	2006	2008	EC-GBA leased from Spanair
Saab 2000	1	1999	1999	HB-IZS leased from Crossair

The Air One fleet progression over the years:

- In January 2006, the airline signed a contract with Airbus for 30 Airbus A320s and 60 options, to replace the carrier's leased fleet of Boeing 737-400s.
- In May 2007, the airline announced the conversion of options and purchase rights for 50 Airbus A320s into firm orders, bringing its commitment to the type to 90 aircraft.
- In June 2008, the airline ordered 24 aircraft from Airbus for 4.8 billion dollars. Air One also had an option to buy another 20 aircraft for 3.8 billion dollars. The order included 12 Airbus A330s and 12 A350s. The order was transferred to Alitalia when Air One ceased operations.

== See also ==
- List of defunct airlines of Italy
