= Avianova (Italy) =

Italian airline

IATA	ICAO	Call sign
RD	NOV	AVIANOVA
- Founded: 1986
- Ceased operations: 1996 (acquired by Alitalia Express)
- Fleet size: 21
- Destinations: Scheduled
- Headquarters: Italy

Avianova was an Italian airline that was integrated into Alitalia in 1997.

== History ==
Avianova was founded in Sardinia in 1986 and began operations using three ATR 42. More ATR 42s were acquired later as Alitalia invested in the airline and hence Avianova became part of the Alitalia Group. Other aircraft used were the Fokker 70 and Saab 340. In 1995, the ATR 72 was added to the fleet. Avianova offered regional and scheduled services. In 1996 it became part of the Alitalia Express and it was integrated into the Alitalia Group in 1997.

== Fleet ==
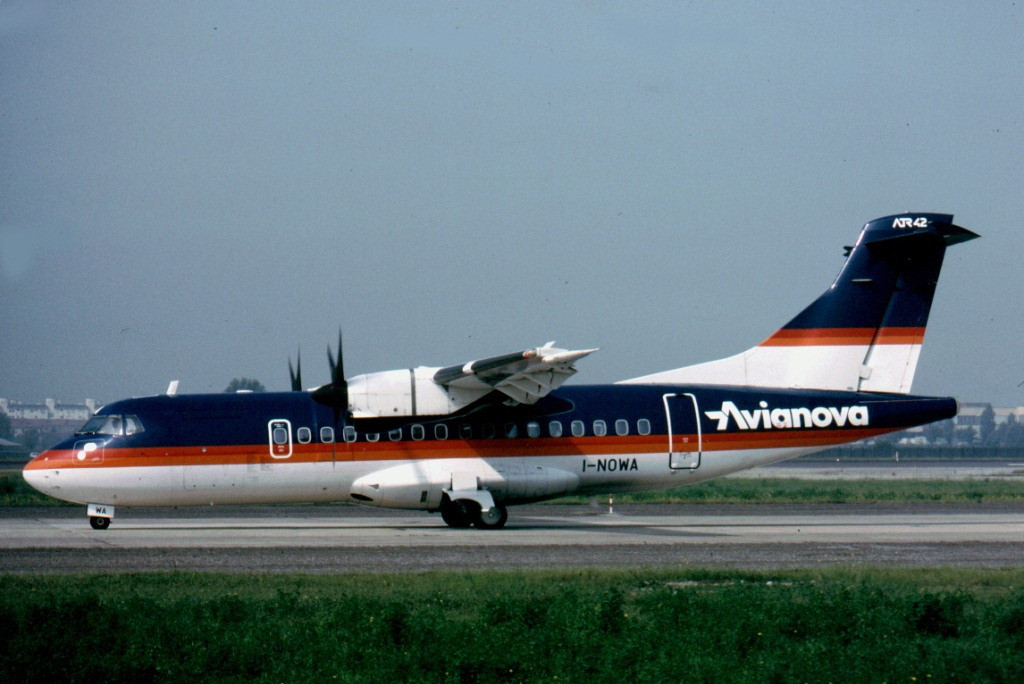
ATR 42-300 in the original livery

Avianova Historical Fleet
Aircraft	Total	Introduced	Retired	Remark
Jetstream 31	1	1989	1990	I-BLUI
