= Azzurra Air =

Italian airline

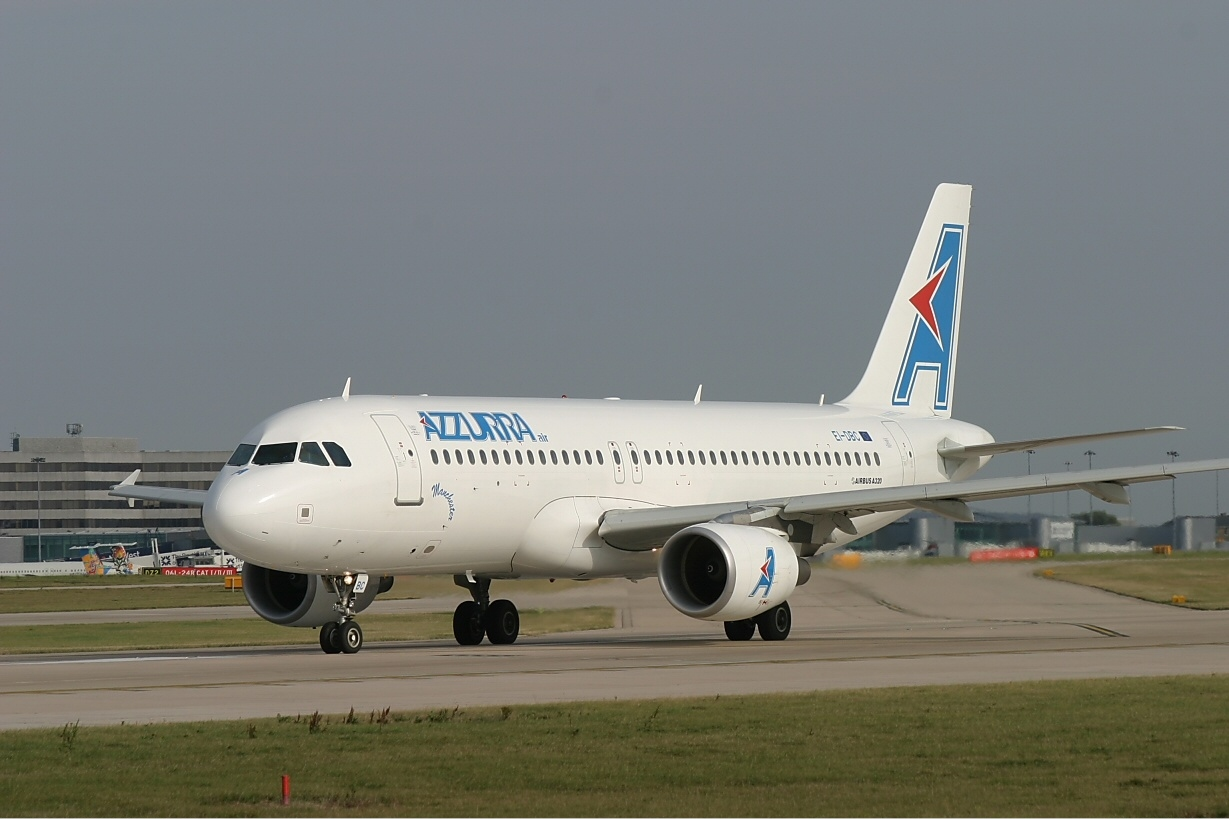
- Airbus A320-200
IATA	ICAO	Call sign
ZS	AZI	Azzurra
- Founded: December 1995
- Commenced operations: December 1996
- Ceased operations: March 2004
- Focus cities: Rome and Bergamo, Italy
- Fleet size: 12
- Destinations: 54
- Parent company: Air Malta, Air International Services
- Headquarters: Milan, Italy
- Key people: Fausto Capalbo (Chairman, Board of Directors)
- Website: www.azzurraair.it

Azzurra Air was a scheduled and charter airline based in Milan, Italy and flying to Spain, Greece, the Netherlands, Portugal and other Mediterranean destinations.

== History ==
The airline was established in December 1995 and was a joint venture by the Italian investment group Air International Services (51%) and by Air Malta (49%). It started operations in December 1996. By the end of 1999, a significant portion of the business was carried out on behalf of Alitalia with BAe 146s, some of them in the full colours of the Italian flag carrier. AIS shares were purchased by UK based 7 Group in 2003, anticipating the purchase of Air Malta shares later that year.

In November 2003 it was announced that Azzurra Air was to take over French airline Air Littoral, but this fell through in the following month as Azzurra Air was in financial difficulties. In March 2004 operations were suspended when its regional fleet was withdrawn by lessor and co-owner Air Malta due to non-payment of leases. It had just over 400 employees. The company was declared bankrupt in July 2004. It had five Airbus A320-200 aircraft on order at the time.

== Services ==
Azzurra Air only operated one scheduled service from Bergamo to Rome using a Boeing 737-700, started on November 2, 1999. All other services were charter operations.

== Fleet ==
The aircraft fleet included:

Aircraft	Image	Total	Introduced	Retired	Remark
Airbus A320-200		2	2003	2004	leased
Boeing 737-300		1	1999	2001	leased from Air Malta
Boeing 737-700		7	1999	2004	leased
BAe 146-200		1	1998	1999	leased from Aer Lingus
Avro RJ70		5	1997	2003	Operated for Alitalia
Avro RJ85		3	1996	2003	Operated for Alitalia
