= Alitalia CityLiner =

Regional airline of Italy (2006–2021)

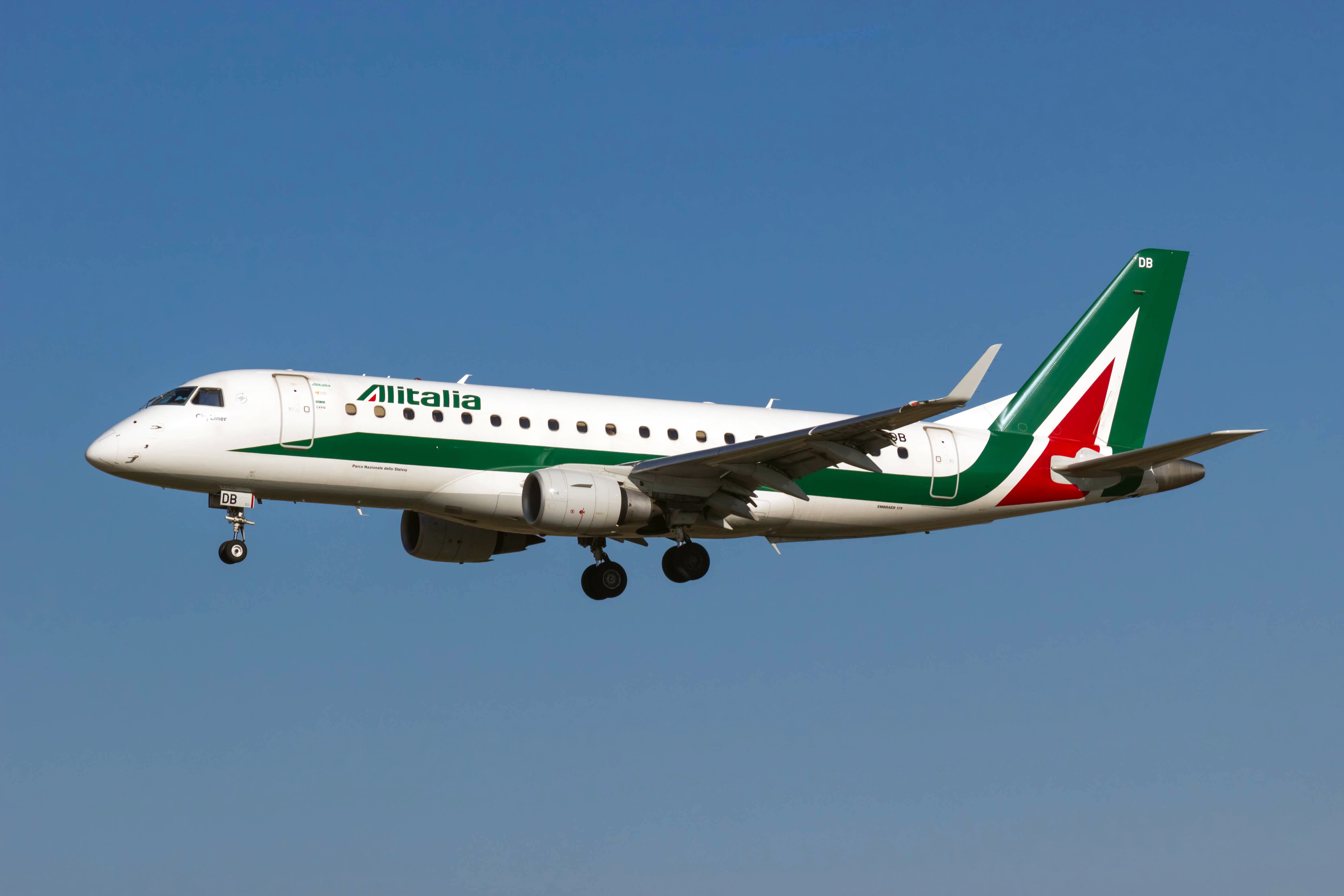
- Alitalia CityLiner Embraer 175 approaching Barcelona in 2015
IATA	ICAO	Call sign
CT	CYL	CITYLINER
- Founded: 7 June 2006 (as Air One CityLiner)
- Commenced operations: 20 April 2011 (as Alitalia CityLiner)
- Ceased operations: 15 October 2021
- Hubs: Milan–Linate; Rome–Fiumicino
- Frequent-flyer program: MilleMiglia
- Alliance: SkyTeam (affiliate; 2009–2021)
- Parent company: Air One (2006–2009); Alitalia (2009–2021)
- Headquarters: Fiumicino, Rome, Italy

Alitalia CityLiner S.p.A. was an Italian regional airline and a subsidiary of Alitalia. It maintained two bases at Leonardo da Vinci–Fiumicino Airport in Rome and at Linate Airport in Milan. The airline operated short haul domestic and international point to point flights using Embraer E-Jet aircraft on behalf of its parent. The airline was a SkyTeam affiliate member through its parent company. It was originally founded by Air One that merged with Alitalia in 2009 and was subsequently renamed.

== History ==
Alitalia CityLiner was founded as Air One CityLiner S.p.A. in June 2006, as a subsidiary of Air One, with a brand new fleet of ten Bombardier CRJ-900s. It commenced operations with flights between Trieste and Rome Fiumicino; and Genoa and Naples, on 7 June. In February 2007, it started its first international route, between Turin and Paris-Charles de Gaulle.

On 13 January 2009, Air One and Alitalia merged under the Alitalia brand name, therefore Air One CityLiner S.p.A. was reincorporated as Alitalia CityLiner S.p.A.

On 20 April 2011, the airline was rebranded Alitalia CityLiner. It became Alitalia's only regional airline, a role previously performed by Alitalia Express. Anew fleet of 20 Embraer 175s and 190s was delivered between September 2011 and March 2013.

In August 2019, the airline's parent company and CityLiner itself were placed under Extraordinary Administration (EA), this due to years of inprofitability. Since 2020 Alitalia was fully owned by the Italian government.

Both Alitalia and Alitalia CityLiner ceased operations at the same time on 15 October 2021 when they were replaced by ITA Airways.

=== Alliances ===
As Alitalia was part of SkyTeam Alliance from 2009 to 2021, Alitalia CityLiner had been a member-affiliate of the alliance.

== Fleet ==
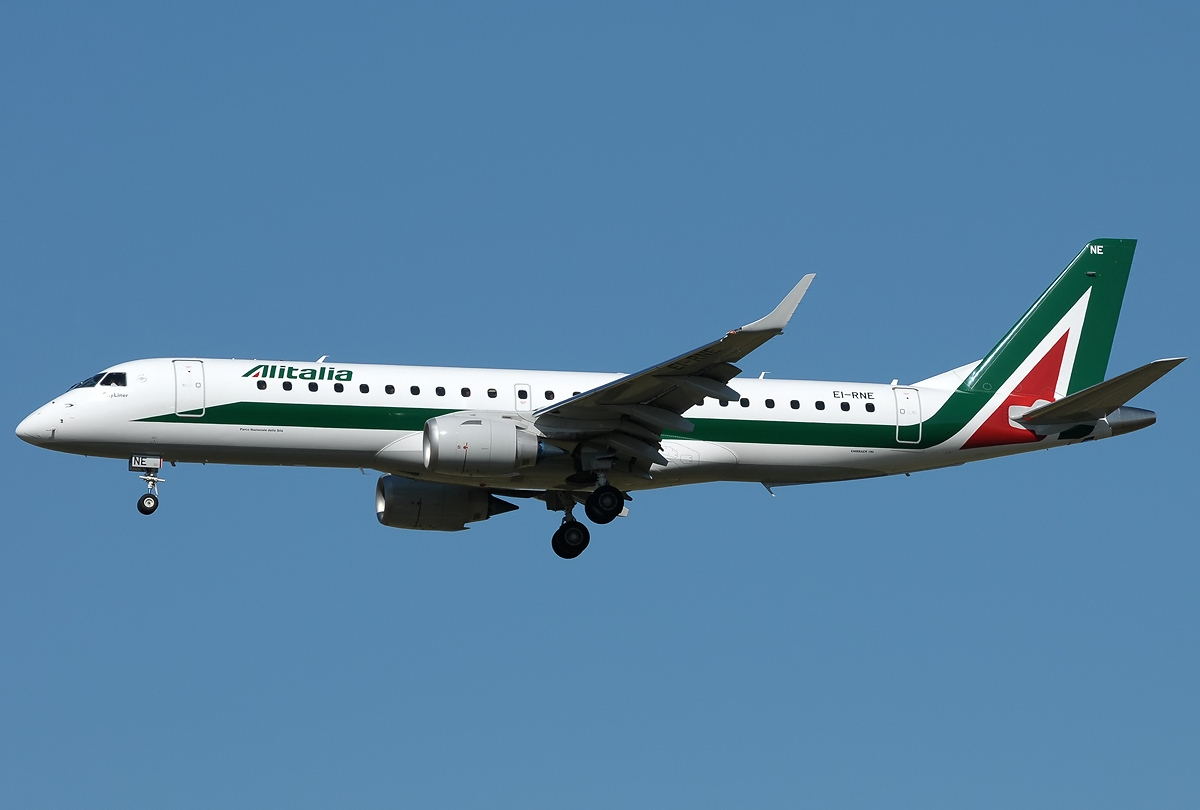
Alitalia CityLiner Embraer 190

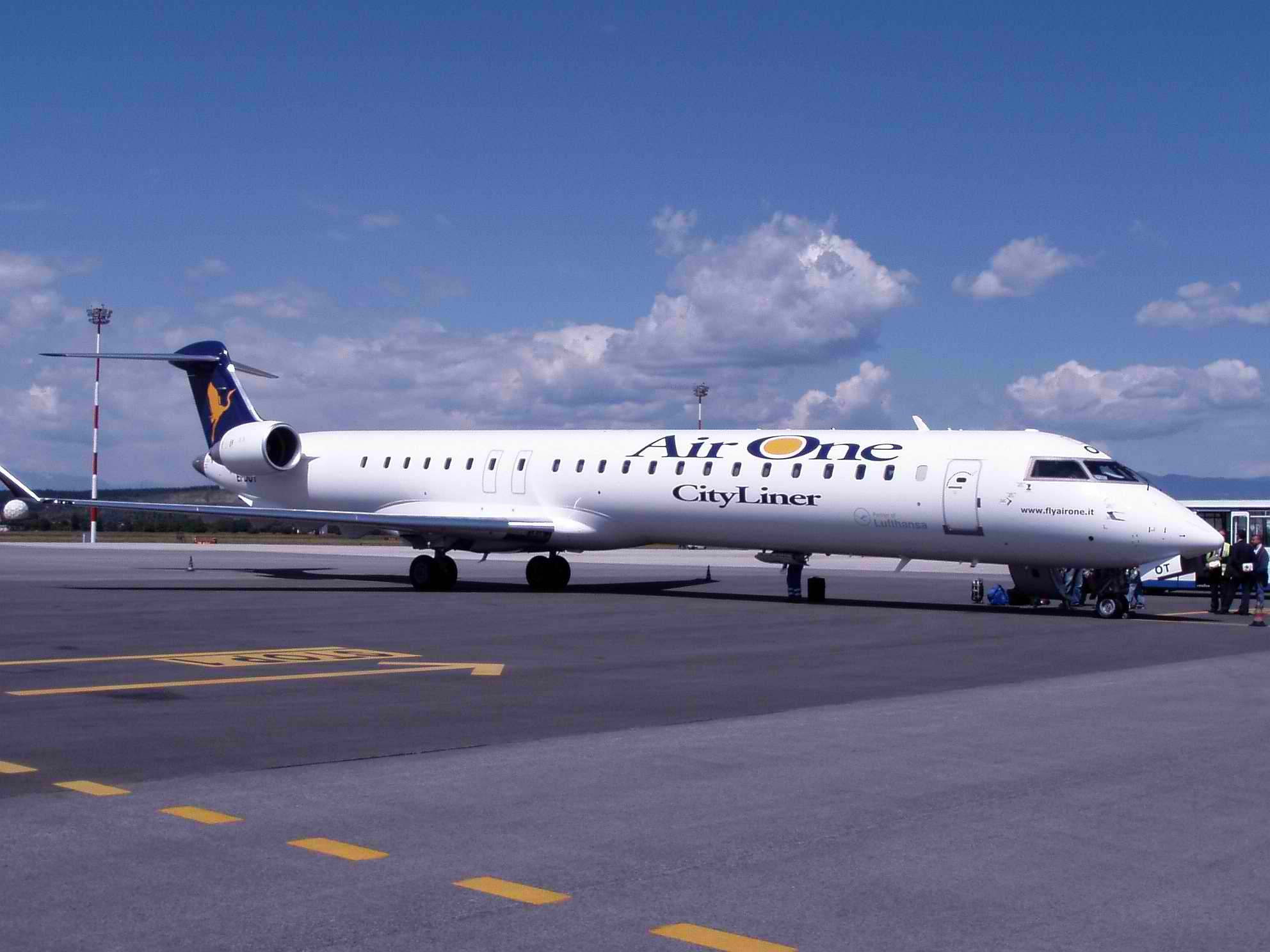
Air One CityLiner CRJ-900

=== Former fleet ===
Before ceasing operations, the Alitalia CityLiner fleet consisted of the following aircraft:

Alitalia CityLiner fleet
Aircraft	In service	Orders	Passengers			Remarks
Aircraft	In service	Orders	Business Class	Economy	Total	Remarks
Embraer 175	10	—	—	88	88	
Embraer 190	5	—	—	100	100	EI-RND in SkyTeam livery
Total	15	—				

=== Historical fleet ===
Over the years, Alitalia has operated the following aircraft types (including aircraft inherited from Alitalia Express and Air One CityLiner):

Alitalia CityLiner historical fleet
Aircraft	Introduced	Retired	Remarks
Bombardier CRJ900	2006	2012	6 previously with Air One CityLiner
Embraer 170	2004	2012	
