= Montana Austria =

Austrian airline, 1975–1981

Montana Austria Airlines

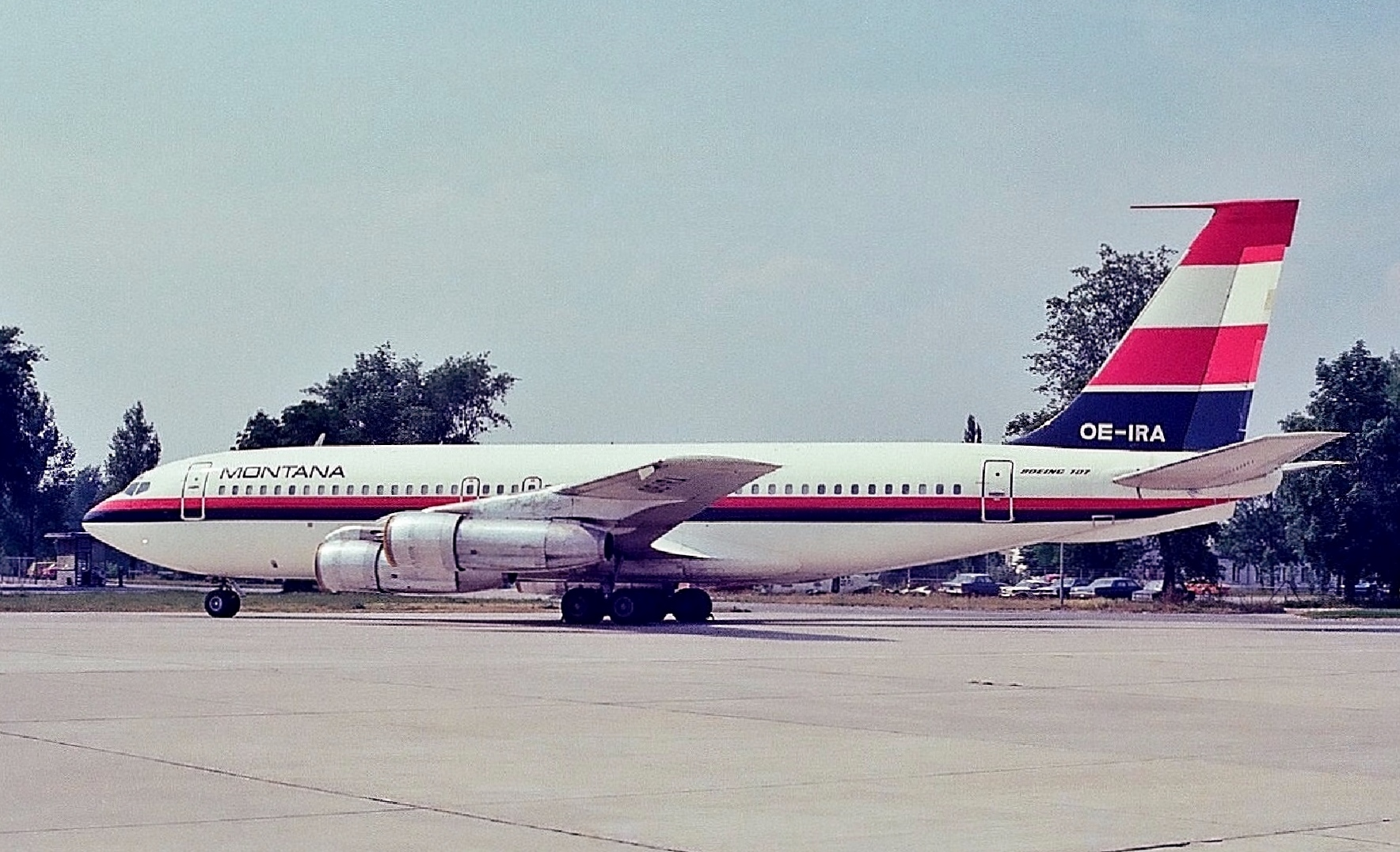
- Boeing 707-138B, OE-IRA
IATA	ICAO	Call sign
OF	YCI	MONTANA
- Founded: 1975
- Ceased operations: 1981
- Operating bases: Vienna International Airport
- Fleet size: 3
- Destinations: 4
- Headquarters: Vienna, Austria
- Key people: Carl Press (main investor); Hans Stöckl (founder)

Montana Austria was an airline based in Vienna, Austria and existed between 1975 and 1981.

== History ==
Montana Austria was founded in 1975 by Captain Hans Stöckl and started using two Boeing 707 aircraft. The company's name was chosen to reflect the mountainous landscape in Austria. A third Boeing 707 aircraft was acquired in 1977. In the beginning, Montana Austria faced bureaucratic difficulties since the then-national monopoly airline Austrian Airlines tried to obstruct any competition.

Finally in November 1976, the airline was granted to serve the Vienna-Baghdad-Bangkok route. Additional routes to other destinations, such as New York, were introduced later. Montana Austria operated only long-haul routes which were not served by Austrian Airlines in the 1970s and thus were considered as a niche in the airline business of Austria back then.

The Austrian aviation expert and journalist Patrick Huber writes in his book "Montana Austria - Österreichs vergessener Langstrecken-Pionier" (English translation:"Montana Austria - Austria's forgotten long-haul pioneer’) that Montana definitely wanted to offer intra-European flights, but did not receive authorisation from the Austrian authorities because Austria protected its state-owned airline Austrian Airlines.This was also confirmed by the former CFO of Montana Austria, who gave the author an authorised interview for the book.

In addition to its own long-haul flights as scheduled and charter connections, Montana Austria also operated wet-lease flights for other airlines, including Aer Lingus, Alitalia and Ariana Afghan Airlines.

Since the number of passengers started to decrease in the late 1970s and early 1980s due to an economic crisis, Montana Austria switched its activities from passenger services to cargo transportation. The only passenger service to remain was the one to New York.

One of the company's aircraft, OE-IDA, was seized on 12th May 1981 and its 4-man crew arrested, together with the two UK gun dealers who had commissioned the flight, by the FBI and Customs agents at Houston Intercontinental Airport, Texas, for allegedly carrying illegal weapons destined for South Africa. The crew were later released with no charges and the aircraft was impounded by US authorities. After the main investor Deugro, the German freight forwarding company, withdrew its financial support, Montana Austria went into receivership and ceased operations. Eventually the Austrian government revoked the airline's operating license. Montana Austria ceased operations in July 1981.

The confiscated aircraft, the Boeing 707-396C with the registration number OE-IDA, was later converted into a VC-137C and used as Air Force Two. From 2000, the aircraft was converted to the E-8C Joint STARS and was used until 2023. The aircraft has been in the Museum of Aviation at Robins Air Force Base since last year. "This makes it the last surviving aircraft from the former Montana fleet", writes Huber in his book.

== Destinations ==
Montana Austria served the following scheduled destinations:

- Baghdad, Iraq
- Bangkok Thailand
- New York City, United States
- Vienna, Austria (Homebase)

== Fleet ==
- 2 Boeing 707-138B (OE-IRA, OE-INA) increased range passenger version acquired from Qantas)
- 1 Boeing 707-396C (OE-IDA, used as a passenger and cargo aircraft)
