= Minerva Airlines =

Italian airline (1996–2003)

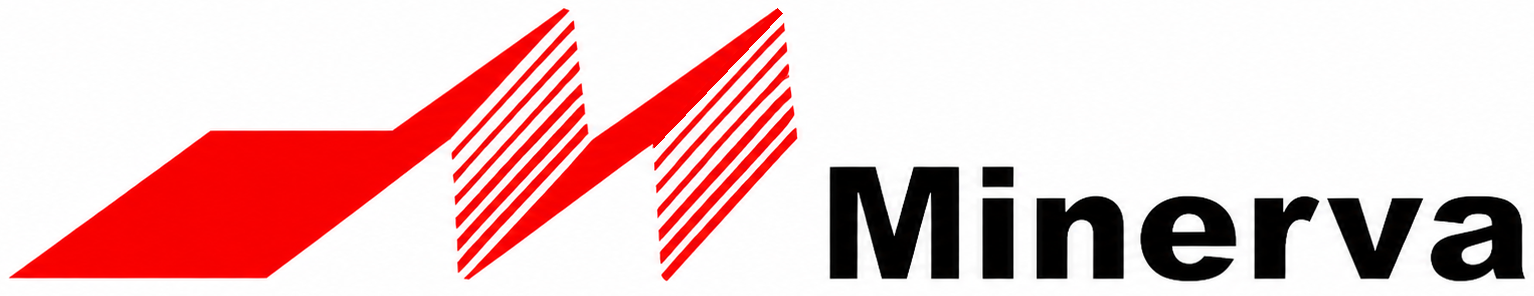

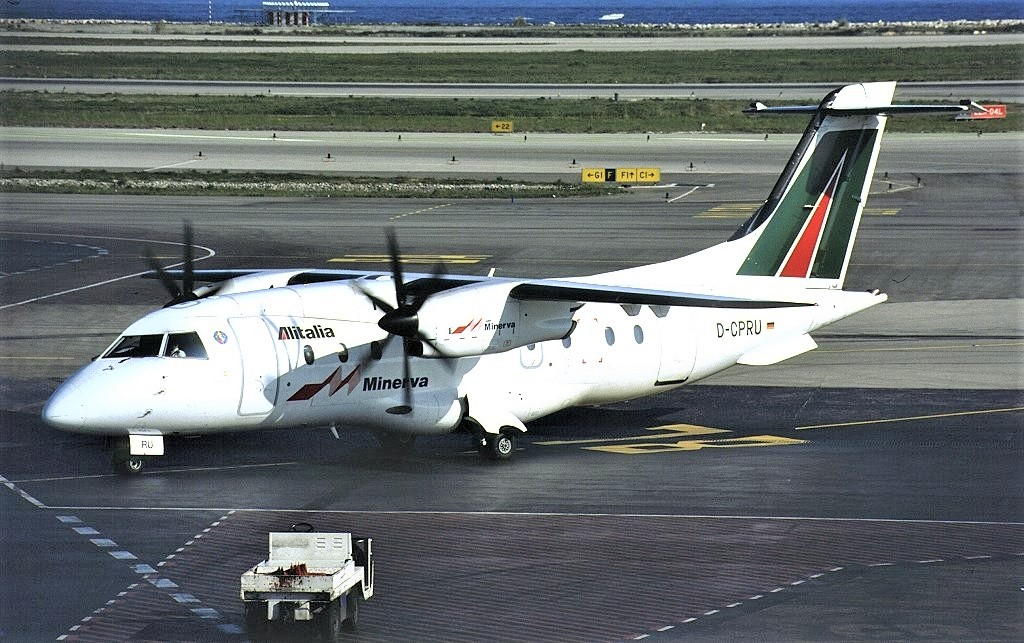
- Dornier 328-100
IATA	ICAO	Call sign
N4	MTC	AIR MINERVA
- Commenced operations: September 1, 1996
- Ceased operations: October 23, 2003
- Operating bases: Trieste Airport
- Hubs: Milan; Bari; Crotone
- Fleet size: 11
- Headquarters: Italy

Minerva Airlines was an Italian regional airline which was operational from 1996 to 2003.. Until 1997, the airline's main base was located at Padua Airport, but in 1998 it moved to Trieste-Ronchi dei Legionari airport. From 1998 the airline operated scheduled flights and some charters on Alitalia behalf.

== History ==
Minerva Airlines was founded on September 1, 1996, beginning operations on that same day. In its early years, the company experienced significant growth thanks to prudent and effective management. The airline centered its operations in Northern Italy, maintaining a primary hub in Milan-Linate airport with additional services originating from the southeastern city of Bari. From 1996, Minerva also utilised Crotone as a base. A new route added in 1997 was from the not very far Lamezia Terme airport, offering free fares to disabled users who were travelling for specialist care in Bologna funded by Catanzaro Red Cross..

By October 1998, the carrier’s network was notable for its lack of routes to Rome, focusing instead on regional connectivity. At its height, the airline operated a fleet of eight Dornier 328-110 aircraft, many of which were utilized under a codeshare agreement with the national flag carrier, Alitalia: 14 domestic routes and 400 weekly flights, and European routes.

Following the 2002 crisis that hit Alitalia, for which Minerva operated entirely, and administrative difficulties, the air carrier was declared bankrupt on October 25, 2003, by the Court of Catanzaro, terminating operations. In the wake of its collapse, several attempts were made to revive the carrier as a regional partner. In March 2004, reports emerged suggesting that Minerva might resume operations using ATR 42 aircraft to fly regional routes for Alitalia. These speculations expanded to include a potential takeover by Alitalia, which would have seen Minerva manage the existing turboprop fleet of Alitalia Express. By June, plans progressed toward a wet-lease arrangement involving up to seven ATR 42-300s intended for the summer season, though the airline ultimately did not return to service.

== Accidents and incidents ==
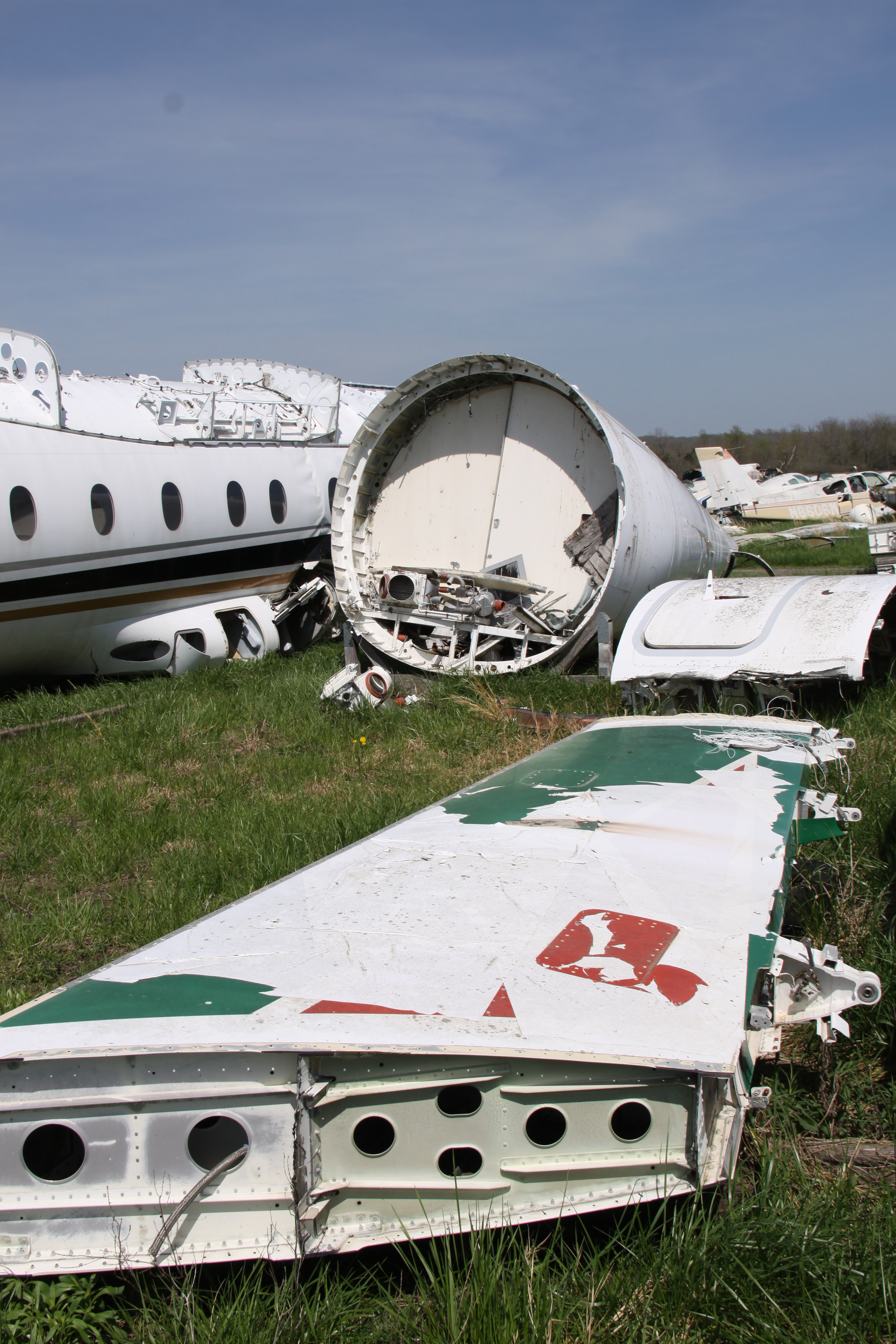
The wreck of flight 1553.

- Minerva Airlines Flight 1553, a Dornier 328 operated by Minerva on behalf of Alitalia overran the runway at Genoa Airport on 25 February 1999. Four people died and 27 survived.
