= Genoa Cristoforo Colombo Airport =

Airport serving Genoa, Liguria, Italy

Genoa Christopher Columbus Airport Aeroporto internazionale di Genova "Cristoforo Colombo"

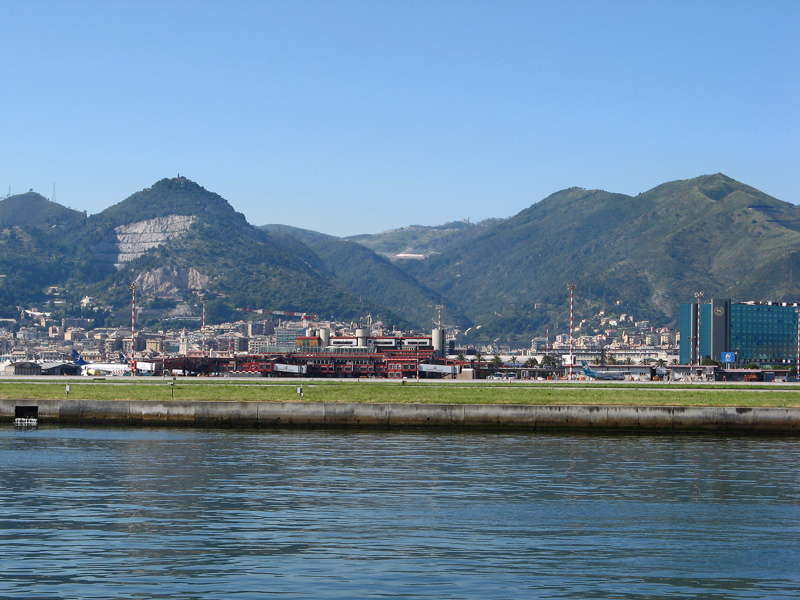
- IATA: GOA; ICAO: LIMJ

Summary
- Airport type: Public
- Operator: Aeroporto di Genova S.p.A.
- Serves: Genoa
- Location: Sestri Ponente, Liguria, Italy
- Opened: 1962; 64 years ago
- Focus city for: Aeroitalia; Ryanair
- Elevation AMSL: 4 m (13 ft)
- Coordinates: 44°24′48″N 008°50′15″E
- Website: www.airport.genova.it

Map
- Location of airport in Italy GOA/LIMJ (Italy)

Runways
Direction	Length		Surface
Direction	m	ft	Surface
10/28	2,916	9,564	Bitumen

Statistics (2024)
- Passengers: 1,335,095
- Aircraft Movements: 15,941
- Cargo (tons): 826.9
- Source: Italian AIP at EUROCONTROL; Statistics from Assaeroporti

Genoa Christopher Columbus Airport or Genova City Airport (IATA: GOA, ICAO: LIMJ) — commonly Genoa-Sestri Ponente Airport after the city district where it is located — is an international airport built on an artificial peninsula, 4 NM (7.4 km; 4.6 mi) west of Genoa, Italy.

== Overview ==
The airport began construction in 1954 and opened in 1962, at a cost of 12.8 billion lira. Building an offshore airport was not a strange or unique solution only for Genoa. Among the most conspicuous examples are other airports in Nice, Venice, Gibraltar, or Hong Kong.

The current terminal building was opened in 1986. It is the most important airport in Liguria and it serves the city and Port of Genoa, as well as a considerable population in Southern Piedmont (Asti and Alessandria Provinces, southern areas of Cuneo Province). In 2018, with 1,455,626 passengers having passed through the airport, Genoa is the 21st busiest Italian airport by passenger traffic.

It is currently operated by Aeroporto di Genova S.P.A., which has recently upgraded the airport complex. The airport is named after the notable Genoese navigator and explorer Christopher Columbus (1451–1506), who is recalled in the monument La Vela di Colombo. The airport was the manufacturing base for Piaggio Aerospace, an Italian aircraft design and production company.

In January 2022, Volotea announced the closure of its Genoa base after five years, leading to the cancellation of 14 routes.

== Airlines and destinations ==
The following airlines operate regular scheduled and charter flights at Genoa Airport:

Airlines	Destinations
Aeroitalia	Rome–Fiumicino, Salerno; Seasonal: Alghero, Olbia
Air Dolomiti	Munich (ends 24 October 2026)
Airidea	Trieste, Marseille
Austrian Airlines	Seasonal Charter: Vienna (ends 17 October 2026)
Discover Airlines	Seasonal: Frankfurt (begins 28 March 2027)
Eurowings	Seasonal Charter: Salzburg (ends 31 October 2026)
ITA Airways	Rome–Fiumicino; Seasonal: Olbia
KLM	Amsterdam
Ryanair	Bari, Cagliari, Catania, Lamezia Terme, London–Stansted, Naples, Palermo, Tirana; Seasonal: Brindisi, Bucharest–Otopeni, Charleroi, Manchester
Scandinavian Airlines	Seasonal: Copenhagen
Volotea	Madrid, Naples (ends 29 October 2026), Paris–Orly; Seasonal: Olbia
Vueling	Barcelona
Wizz Air	Naples (begins 2 March 2027), Tirana; Seasonal: Budapest, Kraków, Warsaw–Chopin

== Ground transportation ==
=== Car ===
Genoa Airport can be reached by travelling in the city's inner roads and by the A10 Motorway, with the closest exit being 'Genova Aeroporto'. Taxi stands can be found just outside the airport. For groups of at least 3 people, taxi fares can be fixed between the airport and the city's main railway stations.

=== Train ===
The closest railway station to the airport is Genova Sestri Ponente-Aeroporto, served by Trenitalia regional trains to/from Piazza Principe/Brignole, Savona and Ventimiglia. The station is then connected to the airport by a bus service called Airlink, operated by AMT Genova.

=== Bus ===
AMT also operates Volabus, a bus service linking the airport with the Genova Piazza Principe and Genova Brignole railway stations. As of 1 August 2020, regional bus operator ATP resumed its Airport Shuttle service between the airport and the other localities in Genoa's Metropolitan City.

== Incidents and accidents ==
- On 25 February 1999, Alitalia Flight 1553, a Dornier 328, operated by Minerva Airlines, operated a flight from Cagliari Elmas Airport to Genoa Cristoforo Colombo Airport. On landing on runway 29, the aircraft overshot the end of the runway and crashed into the sea, due to excessive tailwind and late touchdown. Four of the 31 passengers and crew died in the accident.
