= List of airlines of Italy =

This is a list of active/operating airlines that have an Air Operator Certificate issued by the Ente Nazionale per l'Aviazione Civile, the Civil Aviation Authority of Italy.

== Scheduled airlines ==
Airline	Image	IATA	ICAO	Callsign	Main airport	Fleet	Notes
Aeroitalia		XZ	AEZ	AEROITALIA	Milan–Bergamo Airport; Comiso Airport; Genoa Cristoforo Colombo Airport; Rome-Fiumicino Airport; Salerno Costa d'Amalfi Airport	16	
Air Dolomiti		EN	DLA	DOLOMITI	Verona Villafranca Airport; Munich Airport; Frankfurt Airport	29	
ITA Airways		AZ	ITY	ITARROW	Rome-Fiumicino Airport; Milan–Linate Airport	108	Flag carrier
Neos		NO	NOS	MOONFLOWER	Milan–Malpensa Airport	18	
Sky Alps		BQ	SWU	SKYALPS	Bolzano Airport	13	

== Charter airlines ==
Airline	Image	IATA	ICAO	Callsign	Notes
AElia					Air Taxi
Air Corporate			CPV	AIR CORPORATE	Helicopter services
Air Service Center			RCX	SERVICE CENTER	Helicopter services
Airgreen					Helicopter services
Alba Servizi Aerotrasporti			AFQ	ALBA	Air Taxi
Alidaunia		D4	LID	ALIDA	Helicopter services
Aliserio			TJD	ALISERIO	Air Taxi
Alpine Wings			RIZ	ALPINE WINGS	Air Taxi
Ariane					Helicopter services
Avincis Aviation Italia			ELH		Helicopter services
Avionord			VND	AVINORD	Air Taxi
E+S Air			CAH	SMARTAIR	Helicopter services
Eliabruzzo					Helicopter services
Elicampiglio					Helicopter services
Elicompany					Helicopter services
Elifly International					Helicopter services
Elifriulia			EFG	ELIFRIULIA	Helicopter services
Elilombarda			EOA	LOMBARDA	Helicopter services
Eliossola			EOS	ELIOSSOLA	Helicopter services
Elitaliana			ELA	ELITALIANA	Helicopter services
Elitellina			FGS	ELITELLINA	Helicopter services
Esperia Aviation Services			ESP		Helicopter services
GMG Aviation					Helicopter services
Heliwest					Helicopter services
Helixcom					Helicopter services
Hoverfly divisione Sam			HOV	SKY ELITE	Helicopter services
Il Ciocco International Travel Service			CIO	CIOCCO	Helicopter services
ItalFly			ITL	ITALFLY	Air Taxi
Leader			LSA	LEADER SERVICE	Air Taxi
Mycopter					Helicopter services
Nordend			NDD	NORDEND	Helicopter services
North West Service					Helicopter services
Novaris					Helicopter services
Provincia autonoma di Trento					Helicopter services
Sardinian Sky Service			SSR	SARDINIAN	Air Taxi
Servizi Aerei			SNM	SERVIZI AEREI	Air Taxi
Sirio			SIO	SIRIO	Air Taxi
Sky Aviation					Air Taxi
SLAM Lavoro Aerei			SLJ	SLAMAIR	Air Taxi
Star Work Sky			SWP	STAR WORK	Helicopter services
Westair Helicopters					Helicopter services

== Cargo airlines ==
Airline	Image	IATA	ICAO	Callsign	Main airport	Fleet	Notes
Cargolux Italia		C8	ICV	CARGOLUX ITALIA	Milan–Malpensa Airport	4	Cargo only
MSC Air		CP	LSI	POSEIDON	Milan–Malpensa Airport; Rome–Fiumicino Airport	3	Previously AlisCargo Airlines
Poste Air Cargo		M4	MSA	MISTRAL WINGS	Brescia Airport; Rome–Fiumicino Airport	8	Previously Mistral Air

== See also ==
- List of defunct airlines of Italy
- List of airlines
- List of airlines of Europe
