= Elitaliana =

Italian helicopter company

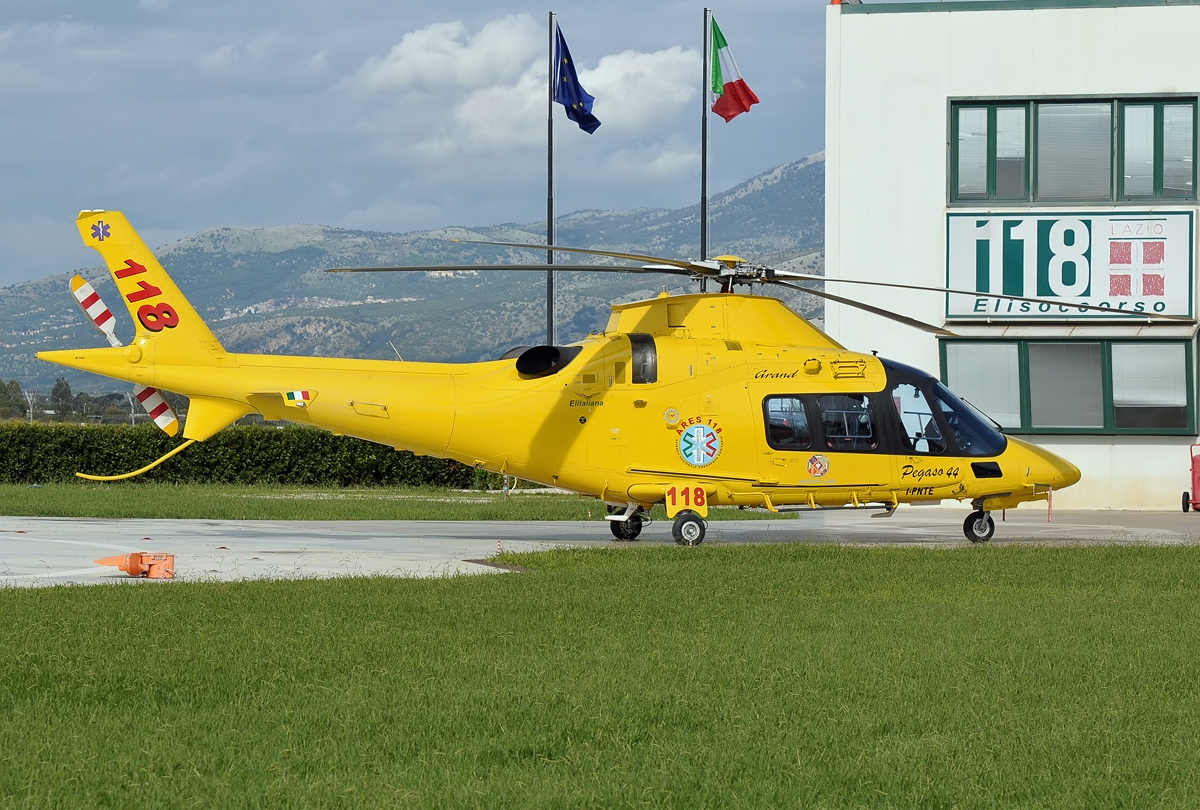
- Company type: Private Company
- Industry: Transportation & Logistics
- Founded: 1964; 62 years ago
- Headquarters: Italy
- Area served: All regions of Italy, Bosnia and Herzegovina and Kosovo
- Website: Elitaliana official website

Elitaliana S.p.a. is an Italian helicopter company located in Rome. It owns the operating license for public transport and the Air Operator Certificate (COA) issued by the National Agency for Civil Aviation (ENAC). From 2009, the company has been active in all sectors of helicopters: Search and Rescue (SAR), aerial work, freight transport, forest fire prevention, disinfestation services, environmental monitoring, etc.

Elitaliana S.p.a. controls the activity of the Elitaliana Training Academy, an ATO (Approved Training Organization) certified in compliance with Regulation (EU) 1178/2011 and the Elitaliana Maintenance aeronautical maintenance company certified according to Part 145 as well as the Ground Aviation Maintenance, the company that deals with the design and construction of helipads. It is operational on nine bases in Italy. Five of them are destined for helicopter rescue.

== History ==
Elitaliana S.p.a. was founded in 1964, and after various vicissitudes refounded on the previous FreeAir Helicopters. For this reason, the brothers Alessandro and Giancarlo Giulivi, members of Elitaliana and Free Air Helicopter, were reported by the Guardia di Finanza for tax evasion of 14 million euro on June 26, 2009.

In 2012 it was accused by the Irish Court of Justice of not having paid the installments of the lease for the purchase of three EC135 T2 helicopters, used by the same at the helicopter rescue bases in Italy and in Kosovo.

After 5 years, in accordance with the request of the Criminal Court of Rome Section VI and the Public Prosecutor, Sentence no. 9906 was issued on 10 June 2014 with which Elitaliana S.p.a. and the brothers Alessandro and Giancarlo Giulivi were acquitted with full formula because "the fact does not exist".

The dispute before the Court of Dublin between Elitaliana S.p.a. and a leasing company was also concluded with a settlement signed by the parties before the Dublin Arbitration Center on 22 March 2013.

It began its HEMS activities (Helicopter Emergency Medical Service) in Lazio starting from 2001. From 1 July 2009, he manages the Relief Service of the Lazio Region on behalf of Ares 118. The contract, which has a duration of 9 years, has been assigned following a public call for tenders issued by Ares 118. The HEMS operational bases in Lazio are three (Rome, Latina, Viterbo) all H24.

== Fleet ==
The Elitaliana S.p.a. fleet It is composed of 18 helicopters. The Elitaliana Training Academy has 4 Robinson R22 and 3 Robinson R44 helicopters. Between 2011 and 2013, it signed an agreement with Finmeccanica-AgustaWestland for the purchase of six AW169 helicopters. In 2014, during the Farnborough Air Show, it also announced the purchase of two AW109 Trekker.

== See also ==
- List of airlines of Italy
- List of airlines
- List of airlines of Europe
