= ITA Airways =

National airline of Italy

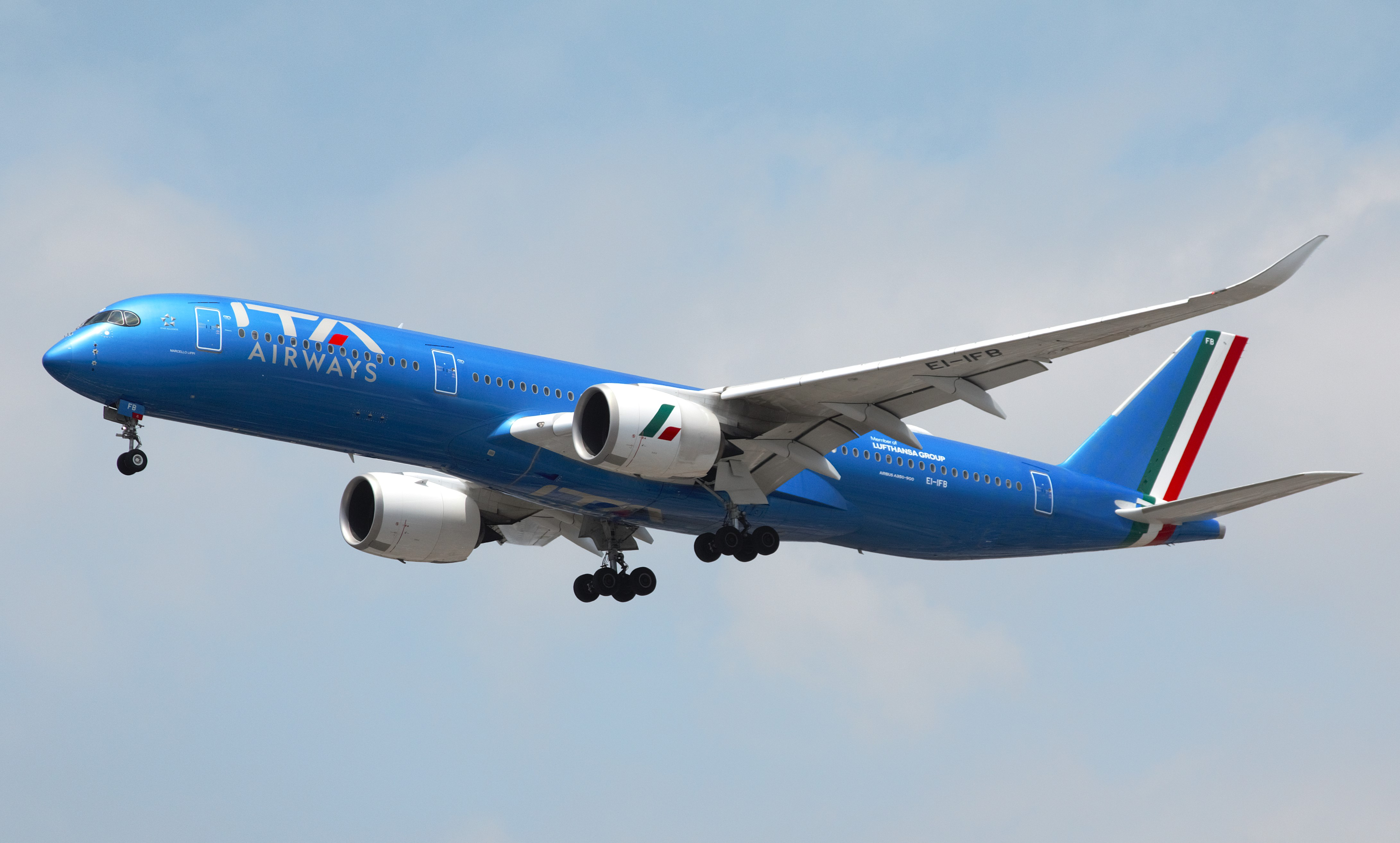
- An ITA Airways Airbus A350-900
IATA	ICAO	Call sign
AZ	ITY	ITARROW
- Founded: 11 November 2020; 6 years ago
- Commenced operations: 15 October 2021; 5 years ago
- AOC #: IT.AOC.0194
- Hubs: Rome–Fiumicino
- Focus cities: Milan–Linate
- Frequent-flyer program: Miles & More
- Alliance: Star Alliance
- Fleet size: 110
- Destinations: 74
- Parent company: Government of Italy (59%)
- Headquarters: Rome, Italy
- Key people: Jörg Eberhart (CEO); Sandro Pappalardo (Chairman)
- Employees: 4,667 (2024)
- Website: www.ita-airways.com

ITA Airways (pronounced [ˈiːta] EE-tah), (legally incorporated as Italia Trasporto Aereo S.p.A. (pronounced [iˈtaːlja traˈspɔrto aˈɛːreo])), is the flag carrier of Italy. It is owned by the government of Italy, via the Ministry of Economy and Finance, and Lufthansa Group.

The airline was founded in 2020 as a successor to the bankrupt Alitalia. The airline flies to over 70 scheduled domestic, European, and intercontinental destinations. Its main hub is the Rome Fiumicino Airport and a focus city is Milan Linate Airport. In 2025, ITA Airways announced that the airline had ended its membership in SkyTeam and later joined Star Alliance in April 2026, as part of the airline's integration into the Lufthansa Group.

== Background ==
Italy's flag carrier Alitalia had been in operation since 1946. It was owned by the Italian government until 2009 when it became a private company after reorganizing and merging with the bankrupt Italian airline Air One. Alitalia reorganized again in 2015 after receiving an investment from Etihad Airways, with Air France-KLM already owning a minority stake. With multiple failed attempts to make the airline profitable, the airline was placed under extraordinary administration in 2017 just days after Etihad Airways ended its support of Alitalia. On 17 May 2017, after the government ruled out nationalizing the airline, it was officially put on the auction block.

After multiple failed negotiations with Delta Air Lines, EasyJet, Italian railway company Ferrovie dello Stato Italiane and China Eastern Airlines, the Italian government took ownership of the airline in March 2020. The government takeover was due in part to the belief the airline would not be able to survive the impact of the COVID-19 pandemic on its own. On 10 October 2020, the Italian government signed a decree to allow the airline to reorganize as Italia Trasporto Aereo S.p.A.

=== 2020 ===
On 28 October 2020, it was reported that ITA was expected to buy several assets from Alitalia – Società Aerea Italiana S.p.A., including the brand and the flight codes of Alitalia and Alitalia CityLiner, the IATA ticketing code (055), the MilleMiglia frequent-flyer program, and airport slots at London Heathrow (68 weekly slots in summer and 65 in winter). The transaction was expected to cost €220 million.

=== 2021 ===
However, on 8 January 2021, the European Commission sent a letter to the Italian Permanent Representative to the European Union calling for Italy to launch an "open, transparent, non-discriminatory and unconditional tender" to shed Alitalia assets. The letter consisted of 62 requests for clarification, rejecting the idea that the old carrier could sell its assets to the new company with no open bidding. The letter stated that ITA should not retain the Alitalia brand, as it is an emblematic indicator of continuity. The European Commission suggested that the combined aviation, ground handling, and maintenance businesses should be sold separately to a third party. It also suggested that slots must be sold, and that the MilleMiglia program in its entirety could not be transferred to the new corporate entity.

On 26 August 2021, ITA officially opened ticket sales on its newly launched website.

On 27 August 2021, ITA applied for an Exemption and a Foreign Air Carrier Permit with the United States Department of Transportation. The document noted the airline's intention to start flying to New York-JFK, Boston and Miami in 2021, Los Angeles and Washington-Dulles in 2022, and Chicago-O'Hare and San Francisco in 2023. The same document stated that before the start of its flight operations, planned for 15 October 2021, ITA would acquire certain assets from Alitalia – Società Aerea Italiana S.p.A., and that ITA would also participate in a public tender to acquire the "Alitalia" brand.

On 30 September 2021, ITA announced that it would work with Airbus as a "strategic partner", providing details of its fleet plans. The airline announced a Memorandum of Understanding with Airbus for the purchase of 10 Airbus A330neo, 7 Airbus A220 and 11 Airbus A320neo aircraft, for a total of 28, along with an agreement with Air Lease Corporation to lease an additional 31 new Airbus aircraft, including the Airbus A350-900.

On 22 October 2021, former Alitalia employees who had not been rehired protested against ITA. Women at the demonstration shouted slogans while wearing only white nightgowns. Company CEO Alfredo Altavilla called the protest "a national shame".

ITA officially joined the SkyTeam alliance on 29 October 2021, but for the time being only for one year until new owners have been found and a long-term strategy has been made.

From 2 December 2021, ITA started carrying flights with the Pope when making pastoral and state visits to a country starting with Pope Francis, replacing Alitalia for most outbound papal flights. The Pope's flight is often nicknamed "Shepherd One" by the press, while the actual callsign is "Volo Papale" (papal flight, in Italian) followed by a serial number.

=== 2022 ===
It was reported in January 2022 that ITA had acquired the Alitalia brand in the fall of 2021 for €90 million, with plans to resume using the name in some fashion.

On 24 January 2022, ITA announced that MSC Group and Lufthansa Group had expressed an interest in becoming majority owners of the Italian airline, with the Italian Government keeping a minority stake. On 10 March 2022, fellow SkyTeam members Delta Air Lines and Air France-KLM also expressed interest in investing in ITA, by teaming up with investment firm Certares. Indigo Partners also expressed interest, leaving a total of three interested parties. After the deadline ended on 23 May 2022, only MSC/Lufthansa and Air France-KLM/Certares bid for ITA. As of 31 August 2022, the Italian government has stated their preference for the Air France-KLM/Certares bid, initiating exclusive talks with the group. In its first year of operation, the airline carried 9 million passengers.

=== 2023 ===
On 19 January 2023, Lufthansa Group submitted a bid to the Italian Government to begin acquiring a minority share in the airline, to purchase the remaining shares over an extended period and have the airline join the larger Lufthansa Group. On 27 January 2023, the Italian government and Lufthansa signed a letter of intent over the sale of a minority stake, paving the way for exclusive negotiations with the German aviation group. On 25 May 2023 Lufthansa Group reached an agreement on the acquisition of a 41% stake in ITA Airways.

=== 2024 ===
The acquisition by Lufthansa Group received approval from the European Commission on 3 July 2024.

=== 2025 ===
On 17 January, Lufthansa Group acquired 41% of ITA, making ITA Airways the fifth network airline of the Lufthansa Group, alongside Lufthansa, Swiss, Austrian and Brussels Airlines. Between 2025 and 2029, there is the option for Lufthansa Group to acquire an additional 49% of ITA, and a further option to acquire the remaining 10% after 2029, making ITA a wholly-owned subsidiary.

On 3 February, Lufthansa Group and SkyTeam announced that ITA Airways had left the airline alliance. Following a transitional period, ITA would join Star Alliance in the first half of 2026.

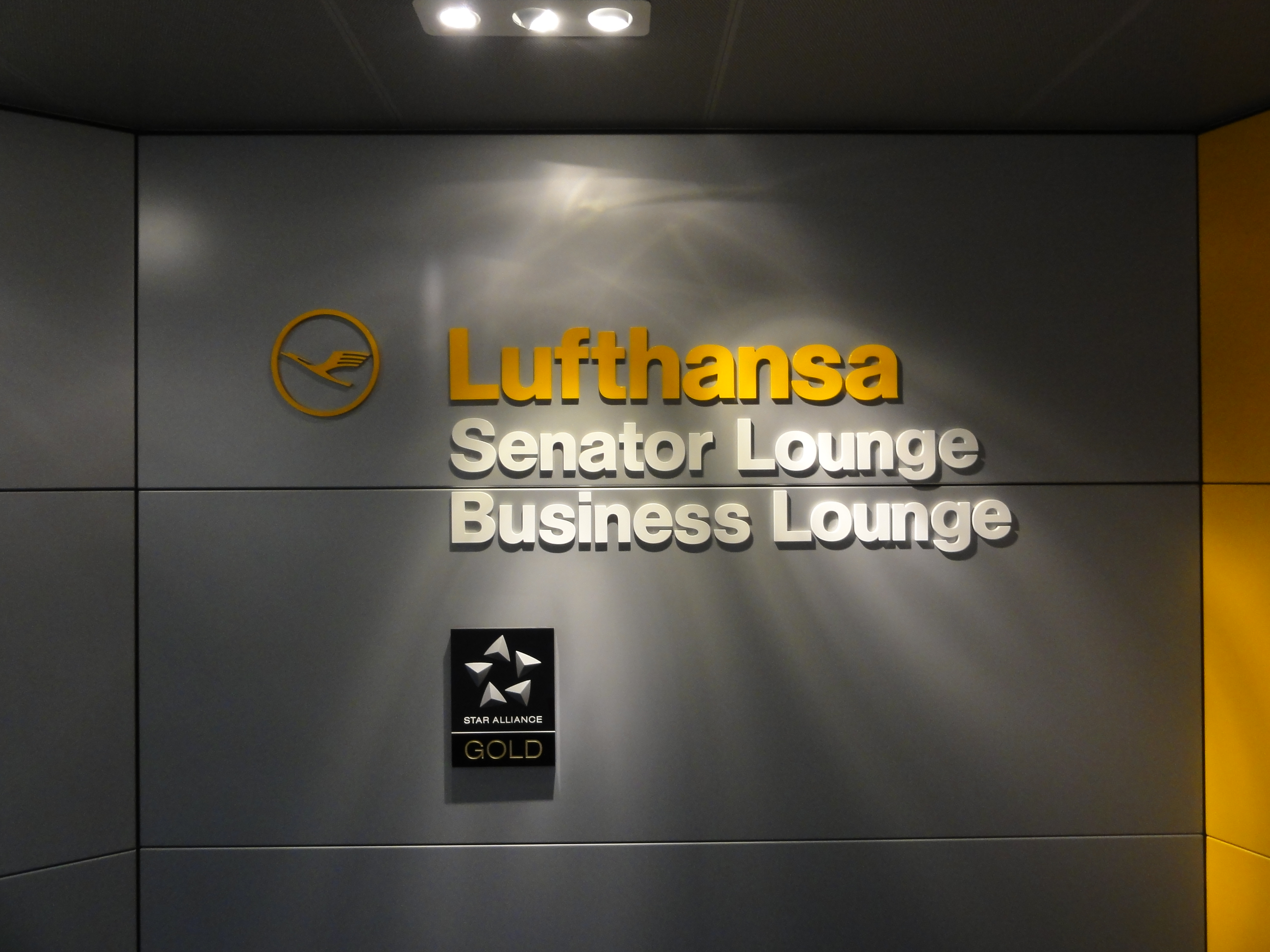
Lufthansa Senator Lounge and Business Lounge at Hannover Airport

On 30 March, at the start of the summer schedule, ITA Airways moved its operations at Frankfurt Airport from Terminal 2 into Terminal 1; and from Terminal 1 into Terminal 2 at Munich Airport to be under one roof with other Lufthansa Group and Star Alliance Airlines. Also in February, a photo emerged on X showing an ITA Airbus A350 painted with the slogan "Inspired by Alitalia."

On 2 April, it was reported that ITA Airways has officially received clearance from the Star Alliance Chief Executive Board (CEB) to initiate the integration process into the airline alliance. The expected date of joining would be in early 2026 as a full member.

=== 2026 ===
On 1 April 2026, ITA joined Star Alliance as the alliance's 26th member. ITA's Volare loyalty programme also ended on 31 March, and ITA Airways joined Miles & More, Lufthansa's loyalty programme, as a fully integrated partner, as of 1 April.

In May 2026, Lufthansa announced it was exercising its option to buy another 49% of the airline and expected the transaction to be complete in early 2027, taking its ownership stake to 90%. Lufthansa holds an option to buy the last 10% in 2028.

== Corporate affairs ==
=== Business trends ===
The key trends for ITA Airways are (as of the end of the calendar year):

Year	Revenue (in billion €)	Net income (in million €)	Passengers (in millions)	Load factor (%)	Ref
2021	0.1	(148)	1.3		(Note: Final 2.5 months of the year)
2022	1.5	(486)	10.1	73	
2023	2.4	(5)	14.8	79	
2024	3.1	(227)	18	81	
2025	3.2	209	16.2	83.4	

=== Logo and livery ===
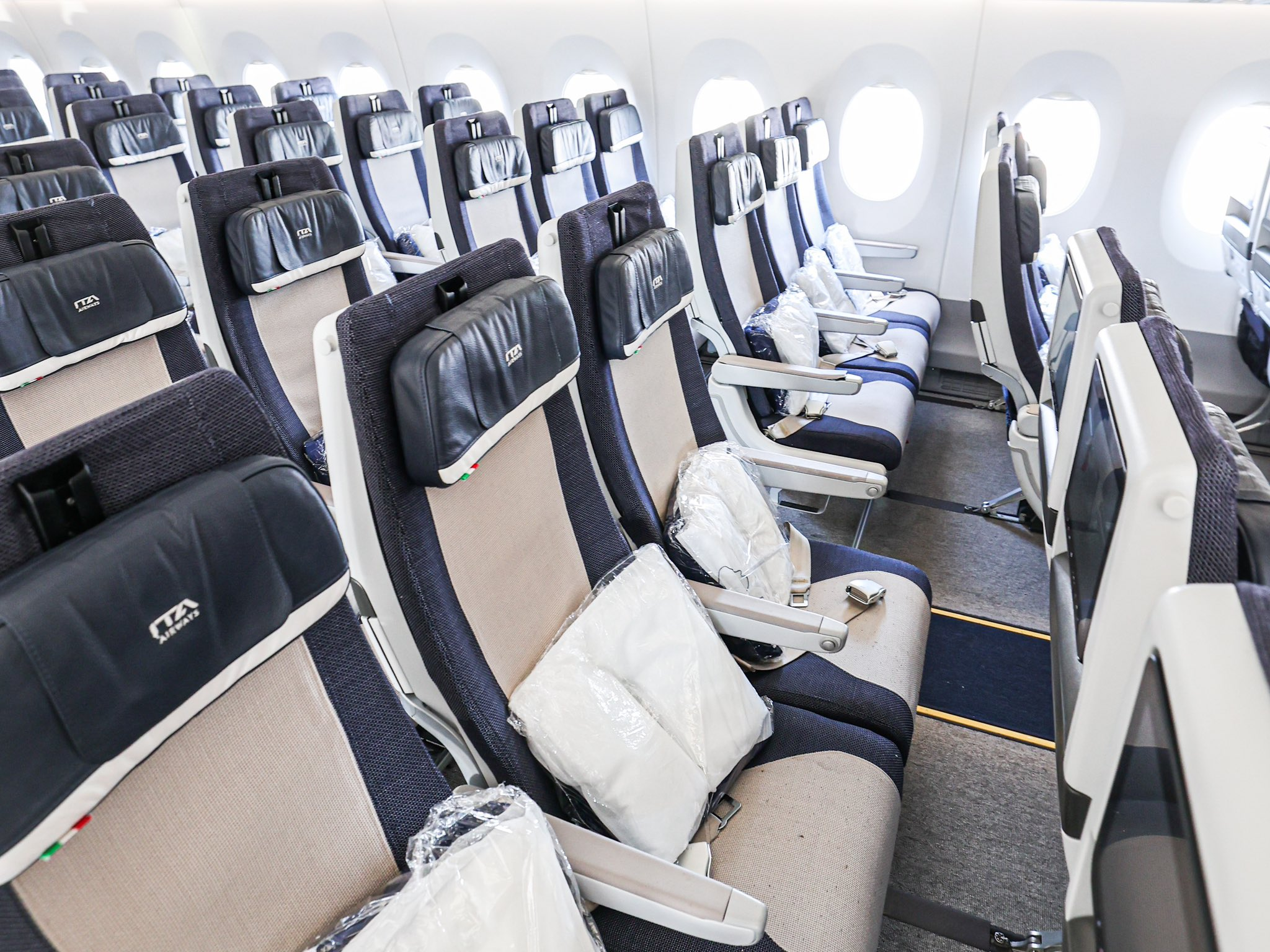
Economy Class on an ITA Airways Airbus A350-900

On 15 October 2021, the day flight operations began, ITA Airways' new brand was also presented. ITA's aircraft livery features a renewed design and new color scheme, with a fully pearlescent Italian blue fuselage and white engines, a white and red "ITA Airways" logo positioned between the first two exit doors, and several icons inspired by Italy's landmarks, along with the Italian tricolor, on the empennage. All aircraft are named after meritorious Italian sportspeople.

The "Alitalia" brand, though not currently used, was purchased for potential future marketing operations and to prevent its use by competitors. In October 2023, ITA Airways sued competitor airline Aeroitalia over its branding and name, deemed too similar to the one once used by Alitalia. In September 2024, ITA Airways began using the tagline "inspired by Alitalia".

=== Ownership and corporate office ===
ITA is part-owned by the Italian government via the Ministry of Economy and Finance. As such, the airline's corporate offices are located in the ministry.

In January 2025, Lufthansa Group completed the acquisition of a 41% stake in ITA Airways. The airline's chief executive officer is Jörg Eberhart.

=== Frequent-flyer program ===
ITA is a fully integrated partner of Miles & More, the loyalty programme of Lufthansa Group.

Volare was the airline's former loyalty program. The European Commission prohibited the airline from buying Alitalia's MilleMiglia loyalty program. ITA ended the Volare program on 31 March 2026.

== Destinations ==
As of November 2024, ITA Airways serves 73 destinations, in Italy, Europe, Africa, Asia, North and South America. ITA plans to serve 74 destinations and 89 routes by 2025.

=== Alliances ===
ITA Airways is a member of Star Alliance.

ITA was a member of the SkyTeam alliance from 2021 until 2025. On 3 February 2025, ITA Airways announced that it would join the Lufthansa Group, and that it would leave SkyTeam for Star Alliance. The airline officially exited SkyTeam on 30 April 2025, and ITA Airways' official accession to the Star Alliance occurred on 1 April 2026.

=== Codeshare agreements ===
ITA Airways codeshares with the following airlines:

- Aerolíneas Argentinas
- Aeroméxico
- Air Canada
- Air Caraibes
- Air Corsica
- Air Dolomiti
- Air Europa
- Air France
- Air Serbia
- airBaltic
- All Nippon Airways
- Austrian Airlines
- Avianca
- Azul Brazilian Airlines
- Brussels Airlines
- Bulgaria Air
- China Airlines
- Croatia Airlines
- Emirates
- Ethiopian Airlines
- Etihad Airways
- Eurowings
- Hainan Airlines
- Icelandair
- Kenya Airways
- KLM
- KM Malta Airlines
- Kuwait Airways
- LOT Polish Airlines
- Lufthansa
- Luxair
- Middle East Airlines
- Pegasus Airlines
- Plus Ultra Líneas Aéreas
- Royal Air Maroc
- Royal Jordanian
- Saudia
- Swiss International Air Lines
- TAP Air Portugal
- TAROM
- Turkish Airlines
- United Airlines
- Vietnam Airlines
- Volotea
- XiamenAir

=== Interline agreements ===
ITA Airways has interline agreements with the following airlines:

- Aeroitalia
- Air Astana
- APG Airlines
- Corsair International
- DAT
- Flydubai
- Hahn Air
- Iryo (railway)
- Italo (railway)
- Neos
- Qantas
- Sky Express
- Trenitalia (railway)
- Trinity Airways
- Virgin Atlantic

== Fleet ==
=== Current fleet ===
As of September 2026, ITA Airways operates an all-Airbus fleet composed of the following aircraft:

Aircraft	In service	Orders	Passengers					Notes
Aircraft	In service	Orders	J	W	Y	Total	Refs	Notes
Airbus A220-100	12	—	—	—	125	125		Replacing Airbus A319-100.
Airbus A220-300	4	—	—	—	148	148		Replacing Airbus A319-100.
Airbus A220-300	15	—	—	—	150	150		Replacing Airbus A319-100.
Airbus A319-100	10	—	—	—	144	144		To be retired and replaced by Airbus A220.
Airbus A320-200	14	—	—	—	174	174		
Airbus A320-200	3	—	—	—	180	180		
Airbus A320neo	19	11	—	—	180	180		Deliveries from 2028.
Airbus A321LR	9	—	12	12	141	165		
Airbus A330-200	1	4	20	17	219	256		Will continue to operate until 2032.
Airbus A330-900	17	—	30	24	237	291		
Airbus A350-900	6	2	33	24	262	319		
Total	110	17						

=== Gallery ===
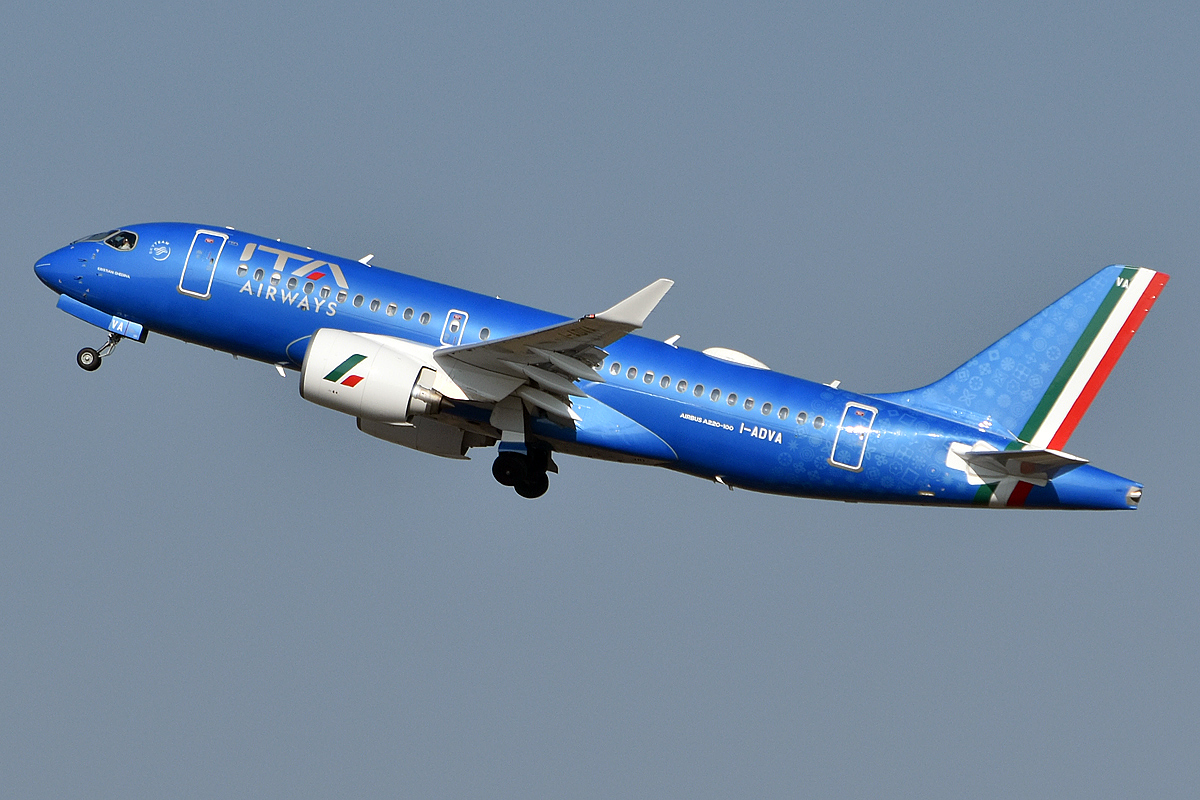
Airbus A220-100

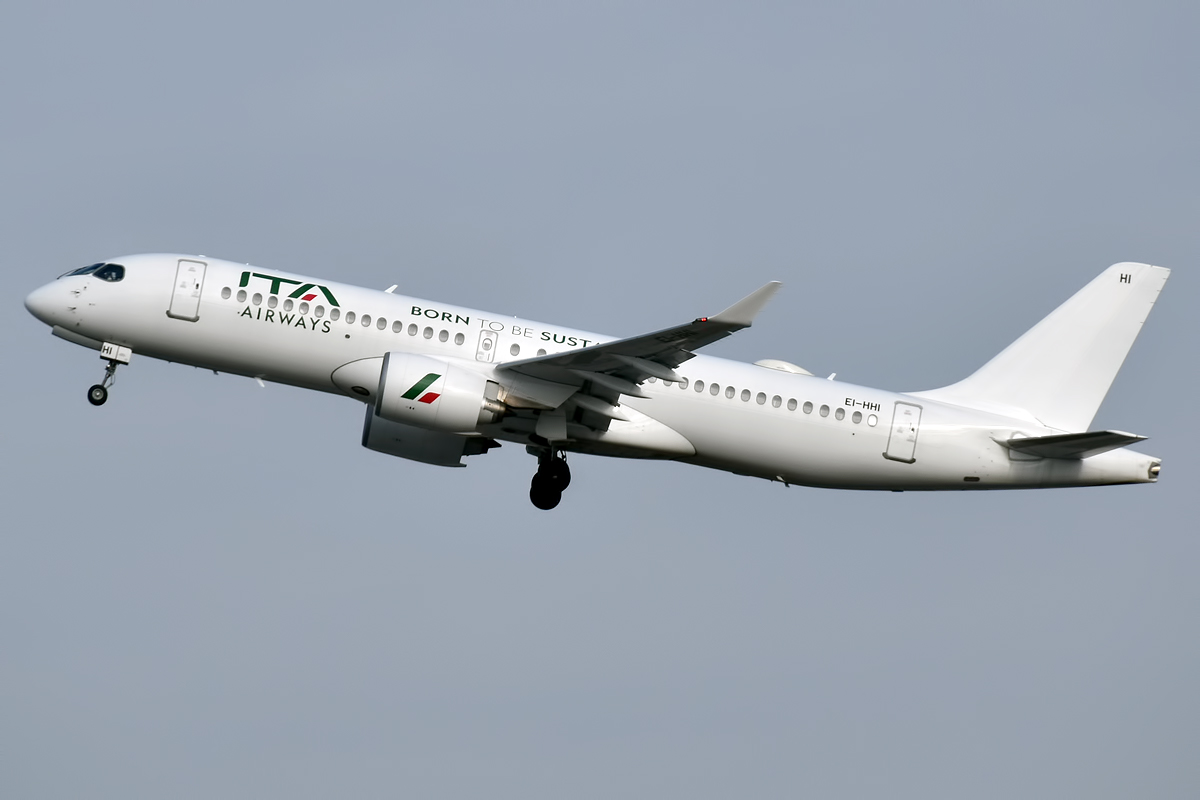
Airbus A220-300

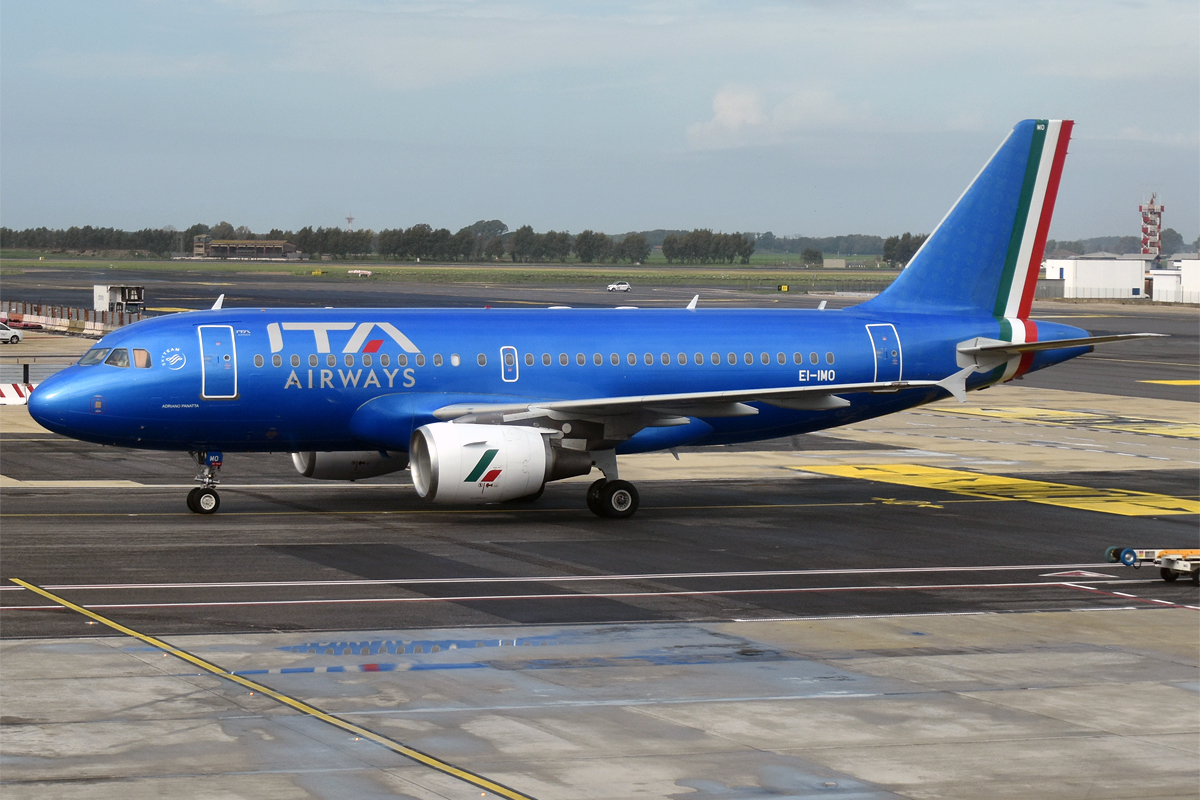
Airbus A319-100

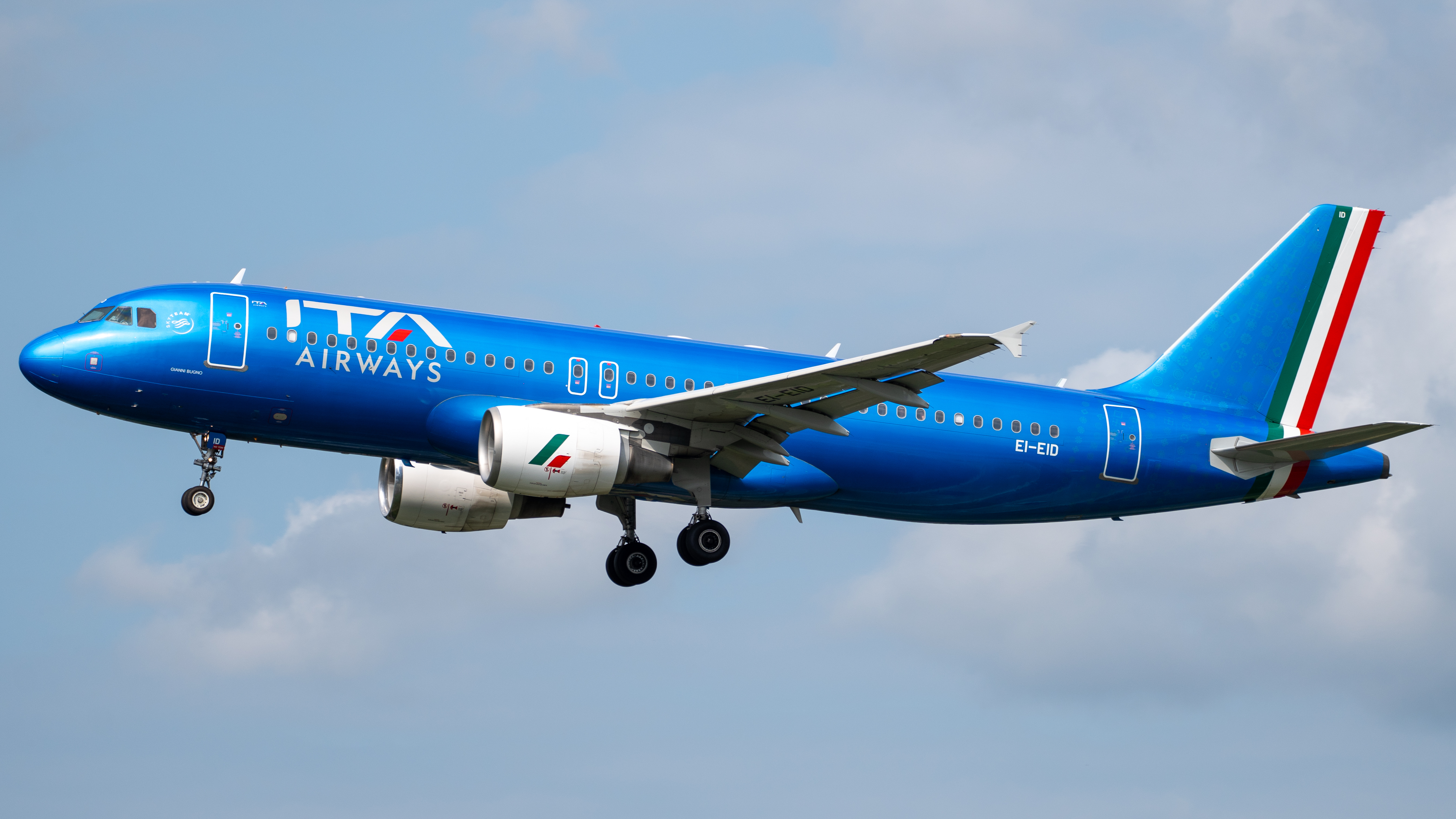
Airbus A320-200

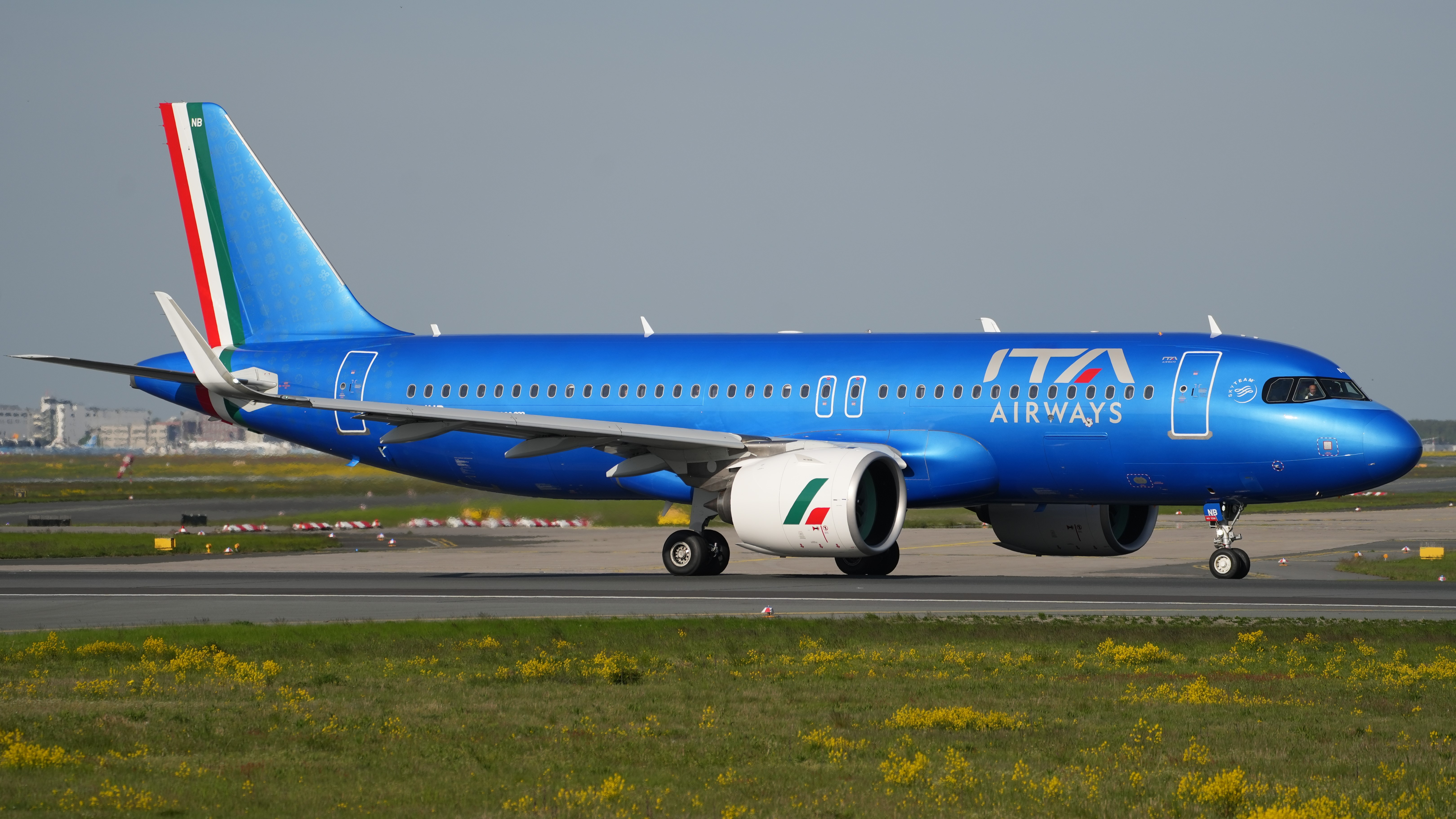
Airbus A320neo

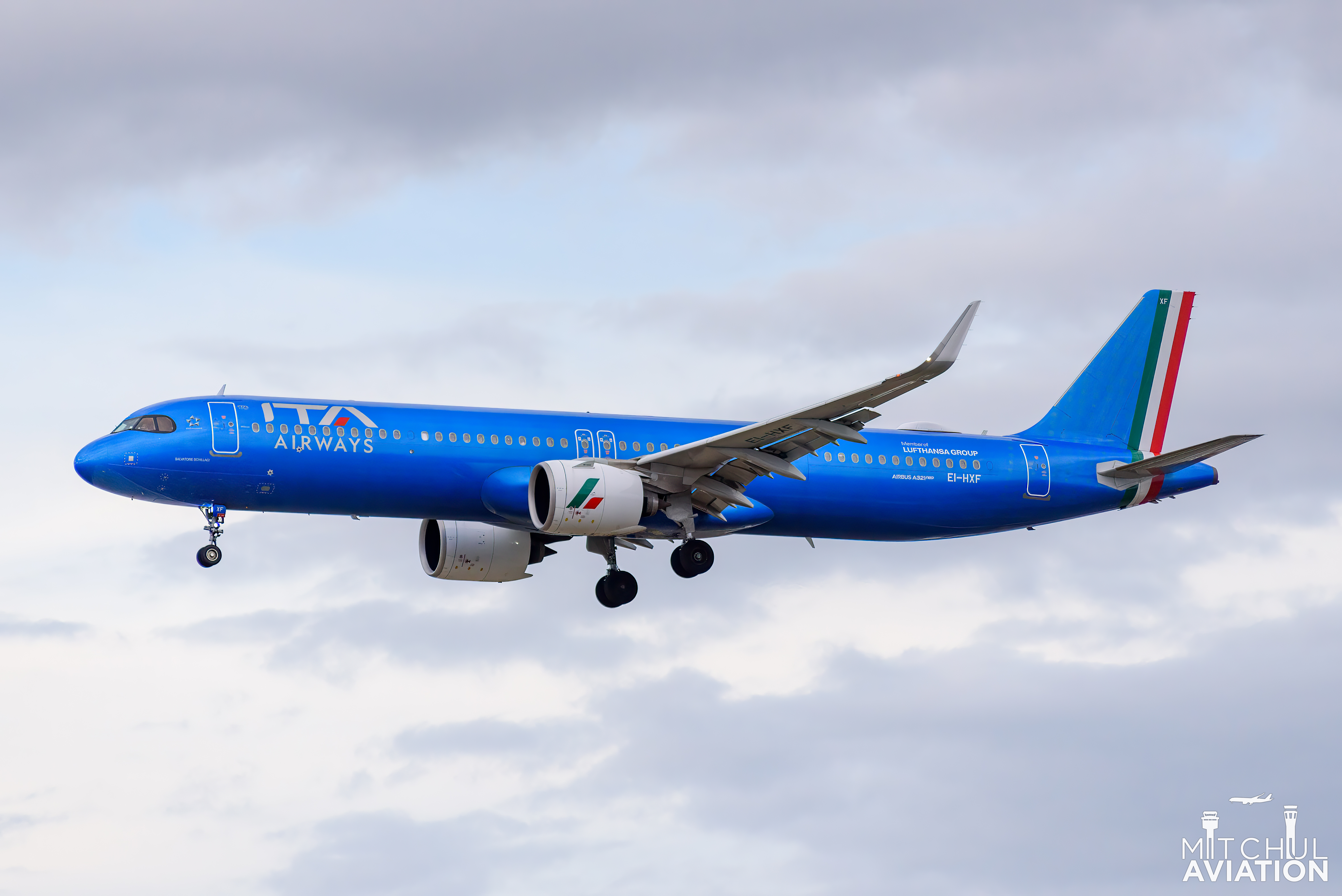
Airbus A321neo

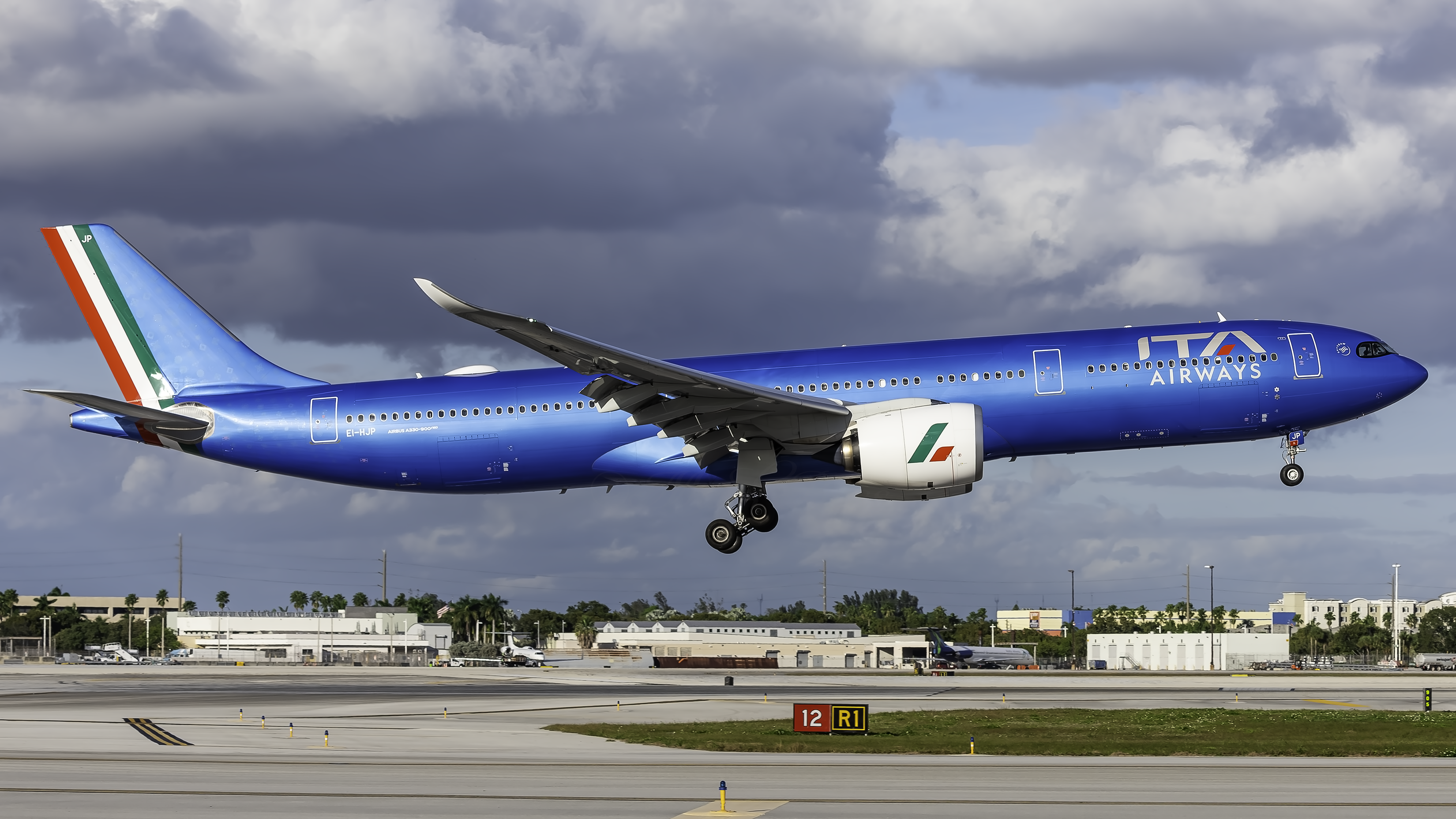
Airbus A330-900

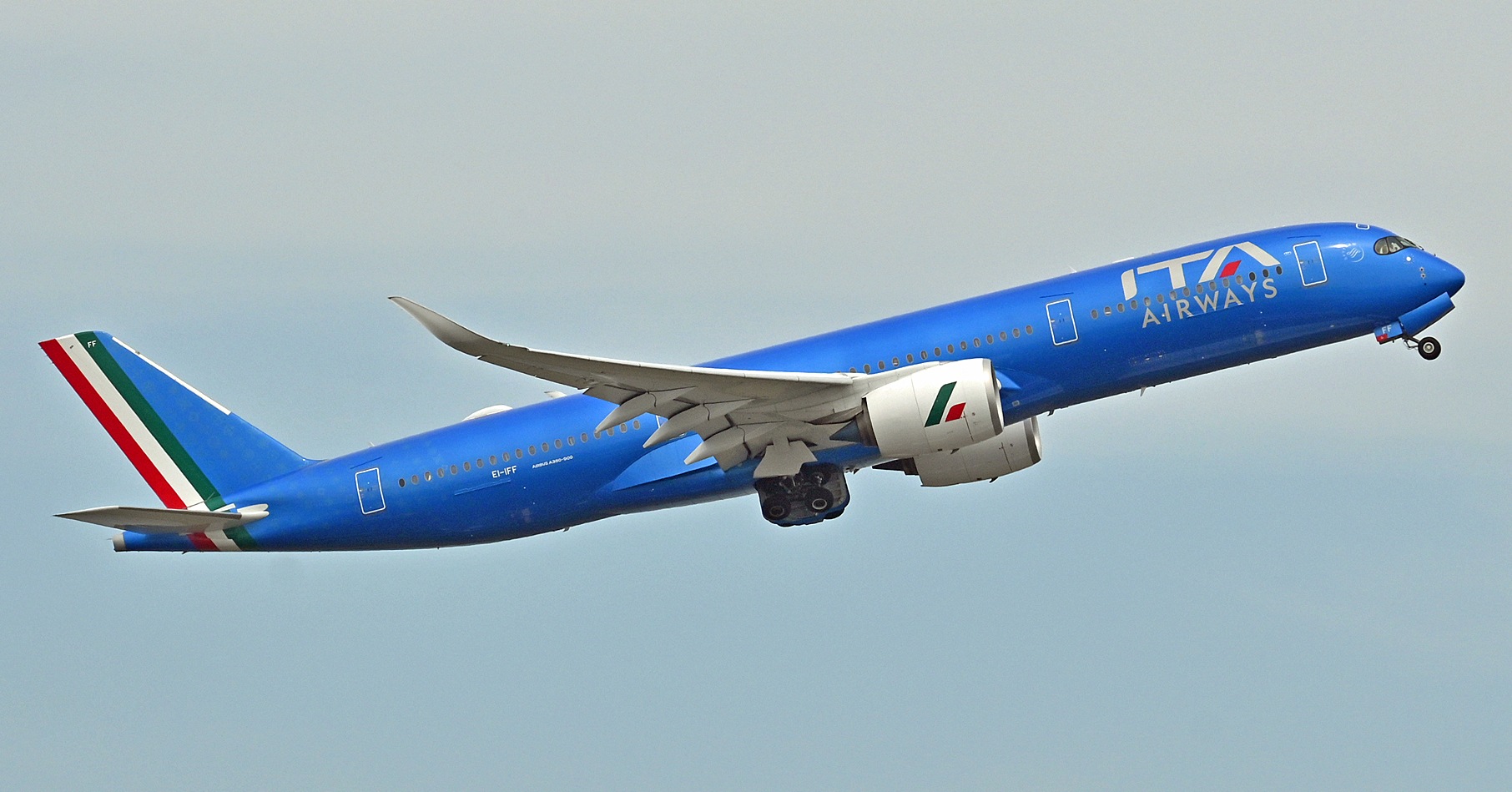
Airbus A350-900

=== Fleet development ===
Announced on 30 September 2021, ITA Airways signed an agreement with Airbus with an order for 10 Airbus A330neo, 11 Airbus A320neo and 7 Airbus A220. ITA Airways also announced an agreement with Air Lease Corporation and other aircraft leasing companies to take up to 56 aircraft, including the Airbus A220, Airbus A320neo, Airbus A321neo, Airbus A330neo, and Airbus A350. The company acquired the Airbus A321neo for the medium-long-haul destinations in the Middle East (Dubai, Riyadh, Jeddah, Cairo) and Central Africa (Dakar, Accra). After the closure of the route between Milan Malpensa Airport and New York—JFK on 8 January 2024, to simplify operations, all intercontinental destinations are operated exclusively from Rome Fiumicino Airport.

On 15 October 2021, ITA Airways took possession of 49 aircraft from Alitalia in the wake of that airline's shutdown on 14 October 2021, including 18 Airbus A319-100s, 25 Airbus A320-200s, and 6 Airbus A330-200s. These aircraft joining the fleet were in addition to the 2 Airbus A320-200 and the 1 Airbus A330-200 already under the ITA Airways AOC. The addition of these 49 aircraft brought ITA's fleet total to 52 aircraft, the planned number for the start of operations.

ITA began retiring their fleet of 8 Airbus A330-200 aircraft, with the intention to be fully phased out by the end of 2025. However, in March 2026, they announced that they had extended the lease on one of the A330s to remain in service for at least 6 more years.

== See also ==
- Air transport in Italy
- List of airlines of Italy
- Transport in Italy
- Alitalia
