= Neos (airline) =

Private airline of Italy

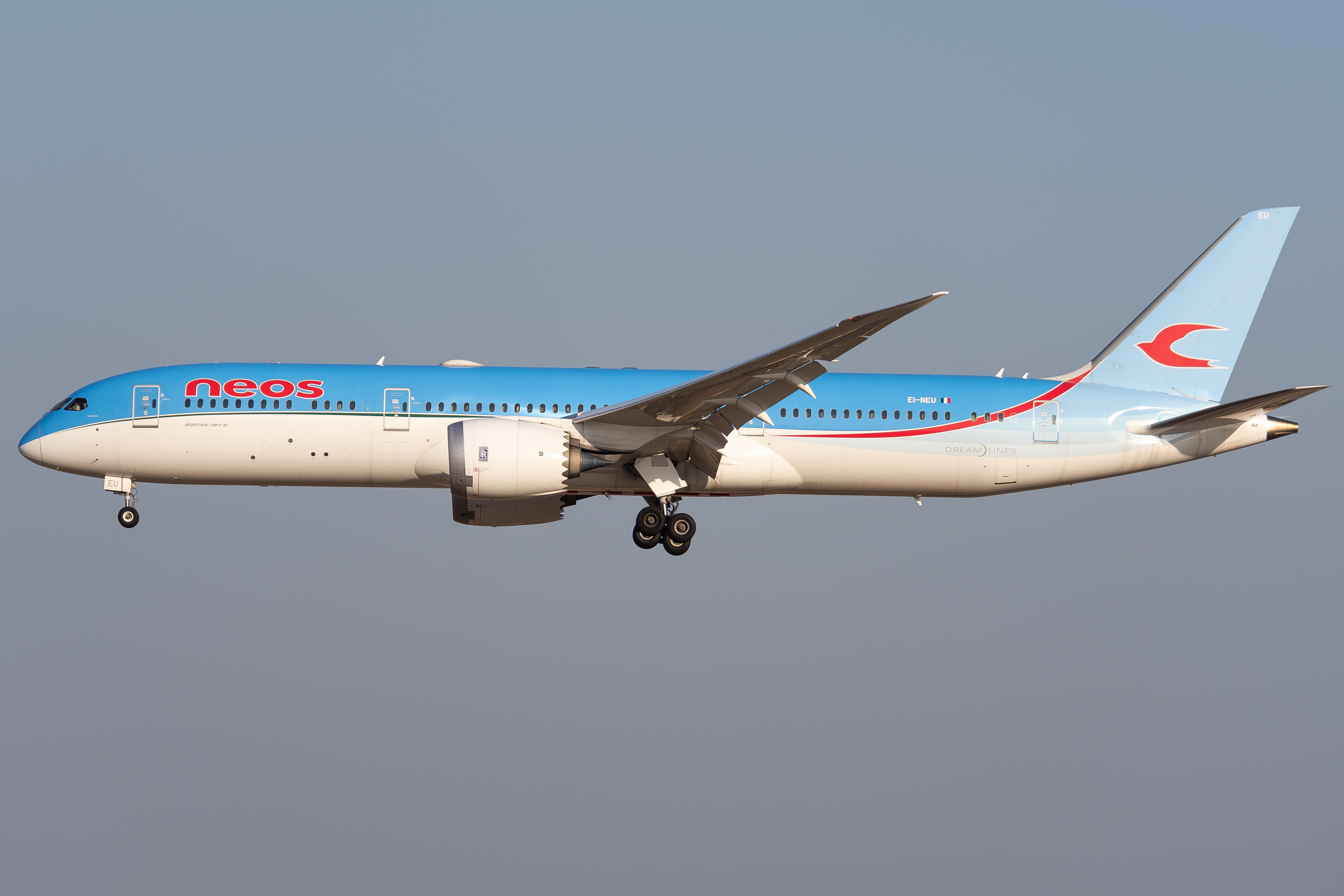
- Neos Boeing 787-9
IATA	ICAO	Call sign
NO	NOS	MOONFLOWER
- Founded: 22 June 2001; 25 years ago
- Commenced operations: 8 March 2002; 24 years ago
- AOC #: NU6F156F
- Operating bases: Bergamo; Bologna; Milan–Malpensa; Rome–Fiumicino; Verona
- Fleet size: 18
- Destinations: 85
- Parent company: Alpitour S.p.A.
- Headquarters: Somma Lombardo, Lombardy, Italy
- Key people: Lupo Rattazzi (president); Carlo Stradiotti (CEO)
- Revenue: ▲€274 million (2016)
- Employees: 1009 (2024)
- Website: www.neosair.it

Neos S.p.A. is a private Italian airline headquartered in Somma Lombardo, Lombardy. It is a subsidiary of Alpitour S.p.A. It operates a fleet of Boeing 737 Next Generation, 737 MAX and Boeing 787 aircraft, flying to over 85 scheduled domestic, European and intercontinental destinations. The airline operates from its main operating base at Milan Malpensa Airport.

== History ==
Neos was established on 22 June 2001 as a joint venture between two tourism companies, the Italian Alpitour S.p.A. and the German TUI Group. Revenue flights were launched on 8 March 2002. In January 2004, Alpitour bought all of TUI Group's shares, making Neos a fully owned subsidiary of Alpitour no longer affiliated with TUI.

In January 2011, Neos' fleet was increased to six aircraft. In 2014, Neos ordered three Boeing 787-8s. These orders were later converted into four larger 787-9s to be added in 2020, with another two taken from Norwegian Air International. Neos became the first Italian operator of the Boeing 787 Dreamliner when its first 787-9 entered service on 25 December 2017. Neos later received its first two Boeing 737 MAX 8 on 30 March 2021, and another two on 8 June 2021.

== Destinations ==
Neos operates flights to destinations in Europe, Africa, Asia, Middle East, and North America.

=== Codeshare agreements ===
Neos codeshares with the following airlines:

- Cubana de Aviacion

=== Interline agreements ===
Neos has interline agreements with the following airlines:

- easyJet
- ITA Airways

== Fleet ==
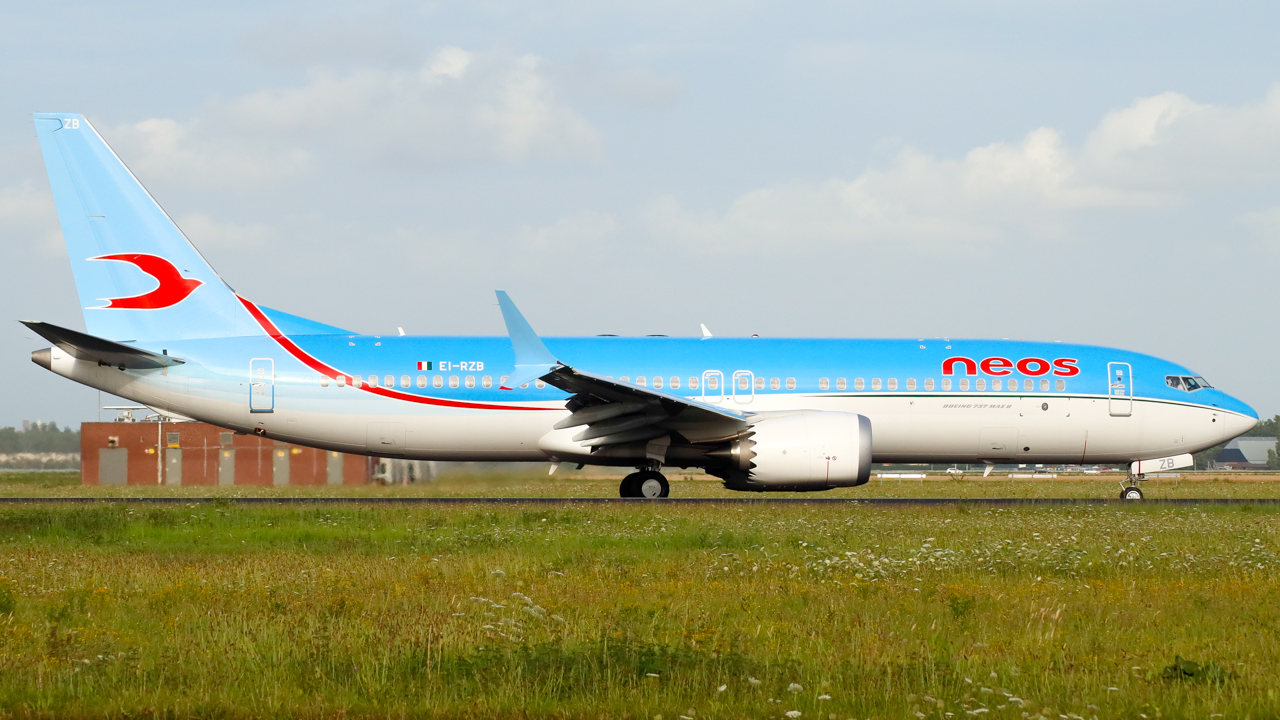
Neos Boeing 737 MAX 8

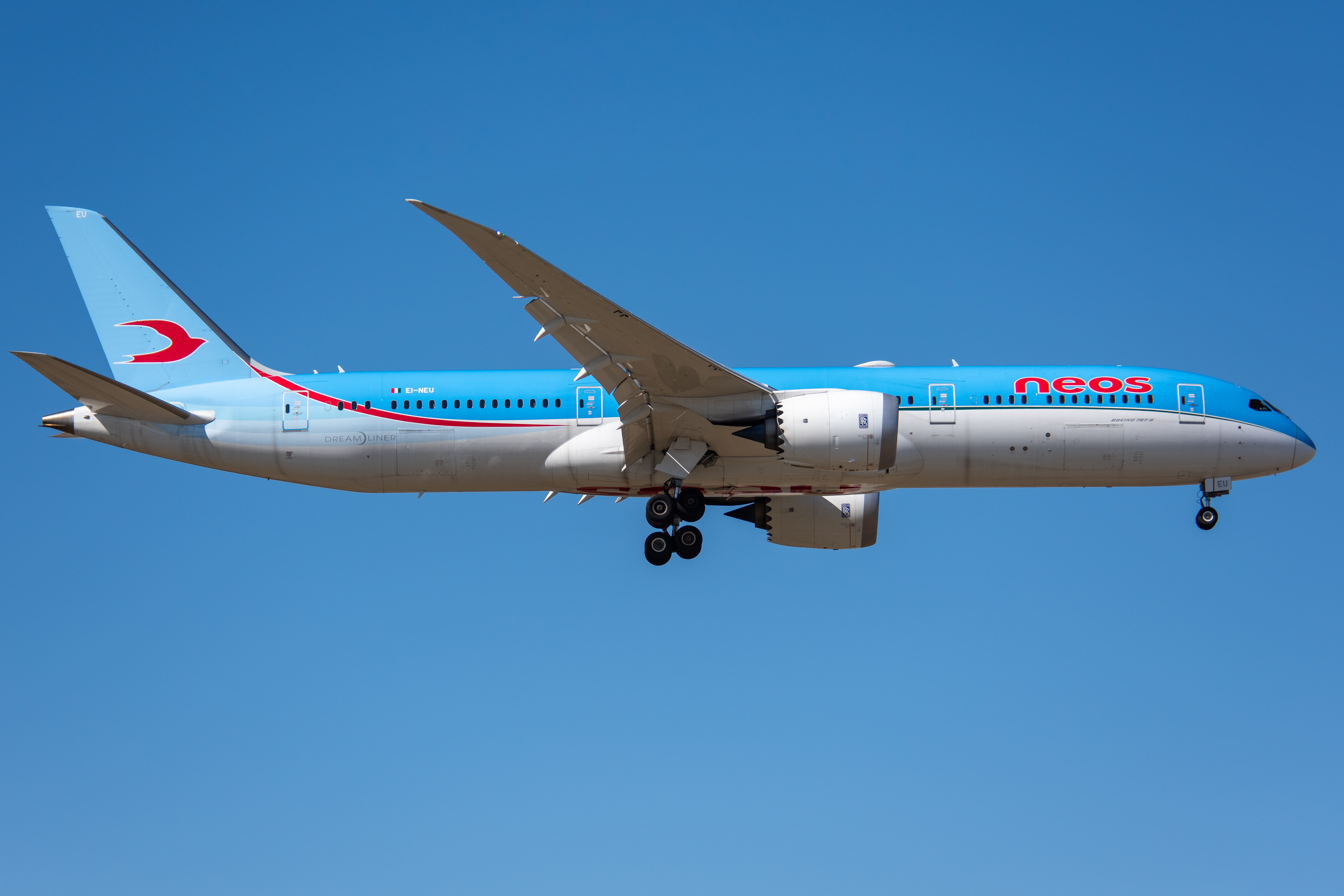
Neos Boeing 787-9

=== Current fleet ===
As of July 2026, Neos operates the following aircraft:

Neos fleet
Aircraft	In service	Orders	Passengers			Notes
Aircraft	In service	Orders	W	Y	Total	Notes
Boeing 737-800	4	1	—	186	186	
Boeing 737 MAX 8	8	—	—	186	186	
Boeing 787-9	6	—	28	331	359	
Total	18	—				

=== Former fleet ===
As of August 2025, Neos operated 4 Boeing 737-800, 8 Boeing 737-8 MAX and 6 Boeing 787-9.

In the past, Neos has operated the following aircraft types:

Neos former fleet
Aircraft	Total	Introduced	Retired	Notes	Refs
Boeing 767-300ER	3	2005	2020	Converted to freighters.	

== Incidents and accidents ==
- On 19 November 2012, Neos Flight 731, a Boeing 767-300ER, encountered severe turbulence during a flight from Holguín to Milan. Multiple injuries were reported.

== See also ==
- List of airlines of Italy
- List of charter airlines
