= Poste Air Cargo =

Italian airline

IATA	ICAO	Call sign
M4	MSA	MISTRAL WINGS
- Founded: 1981
- Hubs: Brescia Airport
- Fleet size: 6
- Destinations: 8
- Parent company: Poste italiane
- Headquarters: Rome, Italy
- Key people: Bud Spencer (Carlo Pedersoli), Founder
- Website: poste.it/posteaircargo

Poste Air Cargo, named Mistral Air until 30 September 2019, is an Italian cargo and former passenger airline headquartered in Rome and is a wholly owned subsidiary of Poste italiane. Its hubs are Brescia Airport and Leonardo da Vinci–Fiumicino Airport in Rome. The airline used to serve domestic scheduled and international charter passenger services which it ceased in mid 2018 while focusing on cargo operations since then.

== History ==
Mistral Air logo used until September 2019

Mistral Air was established in 1981 by actor and former swimmer Bud Spencer (Carlo Pedersoli) and started operations in 1984.

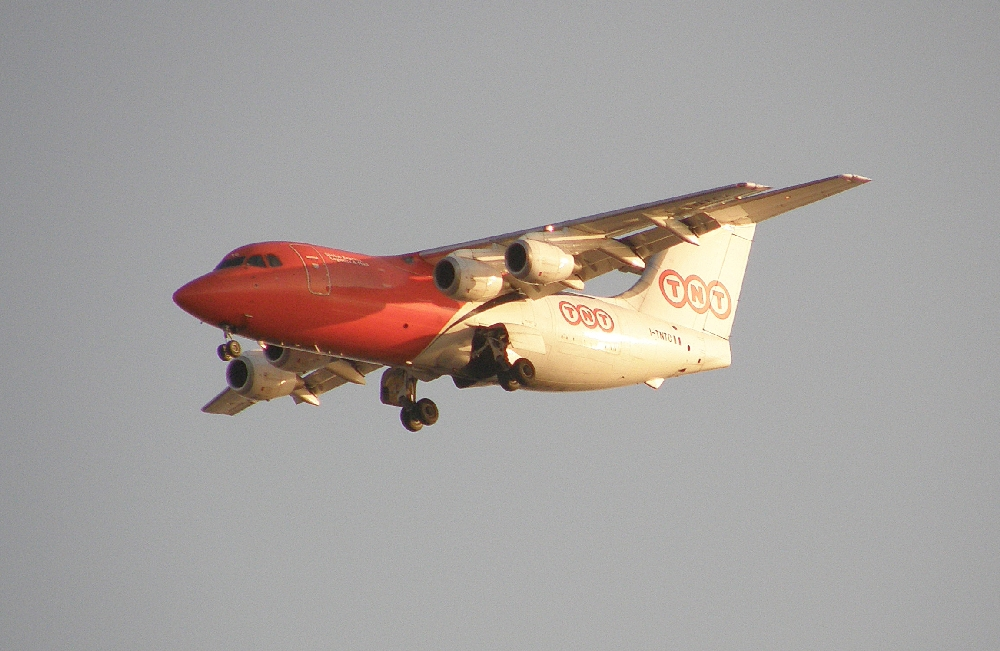
A Bae.146QT in full TNT colors

It was wholly owned by TNT N.V. until March 2002 when TNT sold a 75% stake to Poste Italiane. The airline has also been contracted by the Holy See of the Vatican to fly Pilgrims to holy sites such as Lourdes, Fátima, Santiago de Compostela, Medjugorje near Mostar, Israel/Palestine (Holy Land), Poland and Mexico. The first flight was from Rome to Lourdes on 27 August 2007 transporting the vicar of Rome, Cardinal Camillo Ruini. The fleet incorporated increasingly larger aircraft: 3 Grumman G.159 Gulfstreams (1986–1989), 2 leased Fokker F27s, the first of several British Aerospace BAe.146QTs (starting in 1987), the first of several Boeing 737s (starting in 2006).

In May 2018, owner Poste Italiane announced that Mistral Air will cease all scheduled and charter passenger flights to focus on cargo operations from now on. The airline has been loss-making for years and recently lost a PSO contract for Italian domestic services as well.

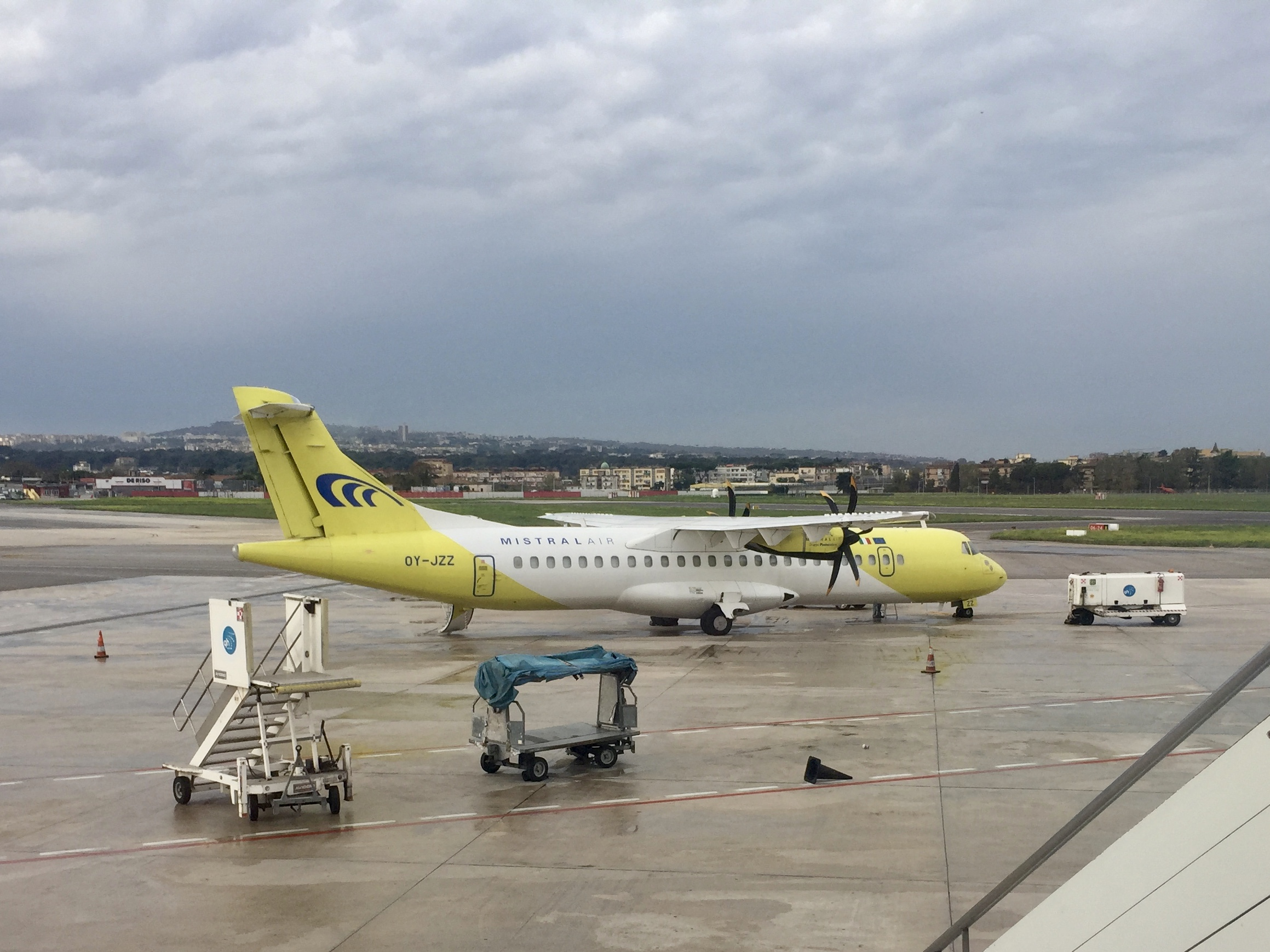
An ATR 72-500 at Naples Airport in the last Mistral Air livery

On 1 October 2019, Mistral Air was rebranded as Poste Air Cargo.

== Destinations ==
As of April 2021, Poste Air Cargo operates scheduled cargo flights to the following domestic destinations as well as 8 international services from their hub in Rome:

Country	City	Airport	Notes	Refs
Italy	Bari	Bari Karol Wojtyła Airport		
Italy	Brescia	Brescia Airport	Hub	
Italy	Cagliari	Cagliari Elmas Airport		
Italy	Catania	Catania Fontanarossa Airport		
Italy	Lamezia Terme	Lamezia Terme International Airport		
Italy	Naples	Naples International Airport		
Italy	Palermo	Falcone Borsellino Airport		
Italy	Rome	Leonardo da Vinci–Fiumicino Airport	Hub	
Malta	Malta	Malta International Airport		

Latest passenger destinations served by Mistral Air brand were Cagliari, Catania, Naples, Palermo, Perugia, Brescia and Pescara in Italy as well as Tirana in Albania which all ceased by August 2018.

== Fleet ==
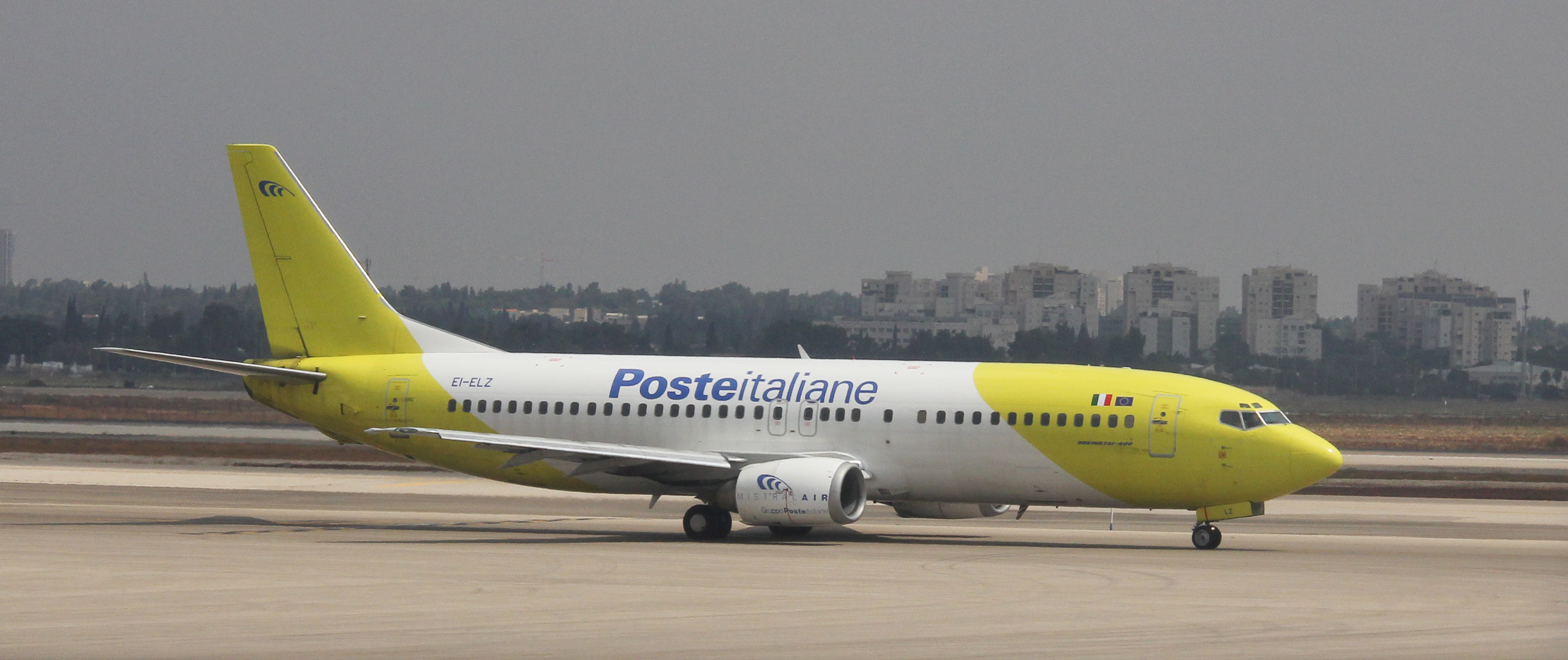
A Boeing 737-400F of Poste Air Cargo

=== Current fleet ===
As of August 2025, Poste Air Cargo operates the following aircraft:

Poste Air Cargo fleet
Aircraft	In service	Orders	Notes
Boeing 737-400SF	3	—	
Boeing 737-800BCF	3	—	
Total	6	—	

=== Former fleet ===
As of August 2025, Poste Air Cargo operated 5 Boeing 737-400SF and 3 Boeing 737-800BCF.
