= Brescia Airport =

Airport in Lombardy, Italy

Brescia Airport "Gabriele D'Annunzio" Aeroporto di Brescia
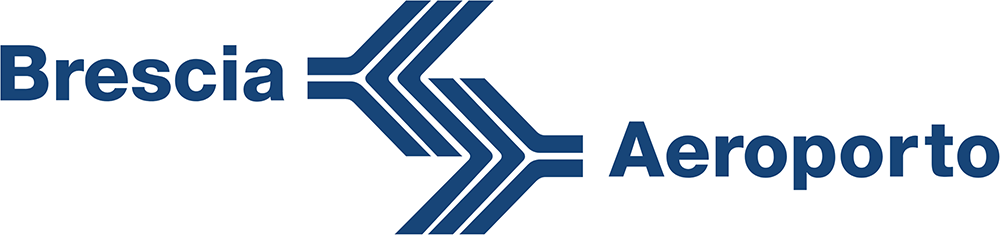

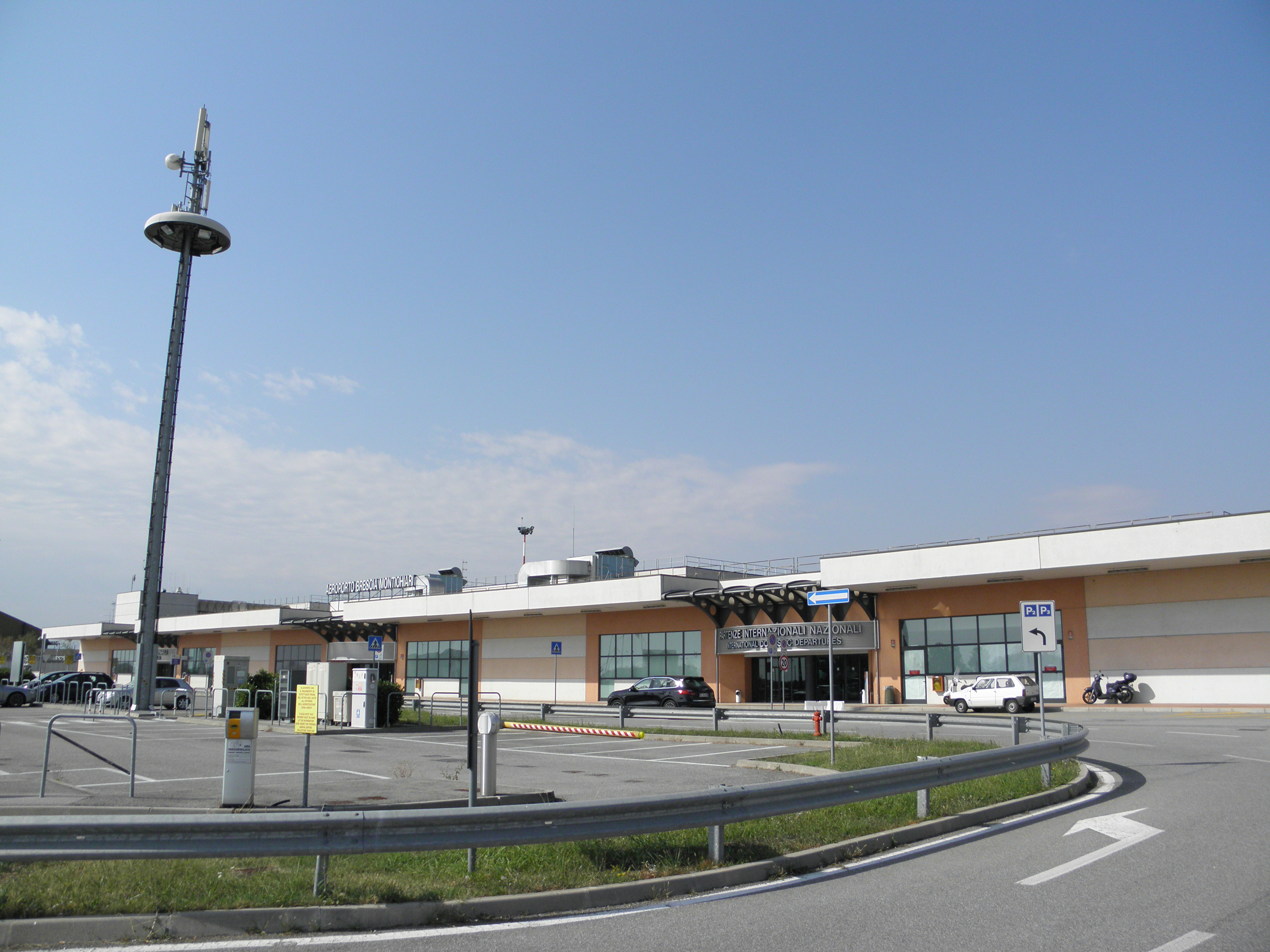
- IATA: VBS; ICAO: LIPO

Summary
- Airport type: Public
- Serves: Brescia, Italy
- Location: Montichiari, Lombardy
- Hub for: Poste Air Cargo
- Built: September 1909; 117 years ago
- Elevation AMSL: 356 ft (109 m)
- Coordinates: 45°25′44″N 010°19′50″E
- Website: www.aeroportobrescia.it

Map
- Location of airport on map of Lombardy Location of Lombardy region in Italy

Runways
Direction	Length		Surface
Direction	m	ft	Surface
14/32	2,990	9,810	Asphalt

Statistics (2024)
- Passengers: 8,662
- Passenger change 23-24: ▼ -1.9%
- Movements: 11,810
- Movements change 23-24: ▼ -1.6%
- Cargo tons: 38,567.8
- Cargo tons change 23-24: ▲9.4%
- Sources:DAFIF; Statistics from Assaeroporti

Brescia "Gabriele D'Annunzio" Airport (Note: Italian: Aeroporto di Brescia) (IATA: VBS, ICAO: LIPO), also known as Montichiari Airport, is located in Montichiari, southeast of City of Brescia, Italy. Other nearby airports are Milan-Malpensa, Milan-Linate, Bergamo Orio al Serio and Verona-Villafranca.

== History ==
The airport is on the site of Italy's first air race meeting in September 1909, and the first outside France. The meeting was attended by the aviators Louis Blériot and Glenn Curtiss, among others. Gabriele D'Annunzio flew in one of Curtiss's planes and drew on the experience of the meeting in his novel Forse che sì forse che no (1910). Franz Kafka and Max Brod also attended and separately published accounts.

Ryanair operated scheduled flights to and from London Stansted Airport and Cagliari-Elmas Airport until the end of October 2010, when the airline decided to move these flights to the nearby Verona-Villafranca Airport.

Passenger traffic has collapsed from strong year on year growth in 2007–2008, from almost 35,000 passengers a month in June 2008 to only 311 passengers in June 2013, a drop of 99% over 5 years.

Brescia Airport is the main sorting base for Poste Italiane's air mail: DHL and Poste Air Cargo postal and cargo flights depart and arrive every night.

The airport also benefits from an intensification of freight traffic, thanks to a partnership agreement signed between the Poste Italiane and Amazon. The cargo trend has seen a further increase since March 2017 with the start of the activities of SW Italia and Silk Way West Airlines, which operate weekly flights between Brescia, Baku and Hong Kong. Since November 2018, the airport has also become one of the main base for cargo flights of the international courier DHL.

== Airlines and destinations ==
=== Passenger ===
There haven't been scheduled passenger services at the airport since July 2018.

=== Cargo ===
Airlines	Destinations
Poste Air Cargo	Rome-Fiumicino

== Statistics ==
Annual traffic (2005-2021)
Year	Passenger count	Percent change
2005	410,000	
2006	232,000	▼43.41%
2007	190,000	▼18.10%
2008	260,000	▲36.84%
2009	204,000	▼21.54%
2010	165,000	▼19.12%
2011	34,000	▼79.40%
2012	23,000	▼32.35%
2013	10,000	▼56.52%
2014	13,528	▲35.28%
2015	7,744	▼42.75%
2016	19,239	▲148.43%
2017	13,821	▼28.16%
2018	8,589	▼37.85%
2019	17,003	▲97.96%
2020	3,874	▼77.21%
2021	5,454	▲40.78%

== Ground transportation ==
On 20 May 2016, APAM (Transport for Mantova) began operation of a twice-weekly shuttle bus service between Brescia-Montichiari Airport to Brescia Santa Eufemia metro station, for onward connections to Brescia railway station. The bus journey takes 20 minutes and operates only on Mondays and Fridays.
