= Roads in Italy =

Network of motorways (in green) and expressways (in blue) longer than 30 km (19 mi) in Italy

Roads in Italy are an important mode of transport in Italy. The classification of roads of Italy is regulated by the Italian traffic code, both from a technical and administrative point of view. The street nomenclature usually reflects the administrative classification. Italy is one of the countries with the most vehicles per capita, with 690 vehicles per 1000 people in 2010.

Italy has a total of 487,700 km (303,000 mi) of paved roads, of which 7,016 km (4,360 mi) are motorways, called autostrade, with a general speed limit of 130 km/h (81 mph), which since 2009 can be raised to 150 km/h (93 mph) under specific circumstances. Around 25,000 km (16,000 mi) are Strade statali (Italian for "state highways") which make up the national network of state highways. State highways can range from dual-carriageway almost motorway-level roads to single carriageway two-lane roads; because of this, state highways have speed limits that range from 110 km/h (68 mph) all the way to 50 km/h (31 mph). This is also the case for regional and provincial roads. The routes of some nowadays state highways derive from ancient Roman roads, such as the Strada statale 7 Via Appia, which broadly follows the route of the Roman road of the same name.

Strade regionali (Italian for "regional road") are a type of Italian road maintained by the regions they traverse. Most regional roads are former state highways which were ceded by the state to the regions which the highway traversed for better management. A regional road is less important than a state highway, but more important than a strada provinciale (Italian for "provincial road"). A provincial road is an Italian road that is maintained by provinces or metropolitan cities, and, similarly to regional roads, are usually former state highways ceded by the state to the provinces which the highway traversed. A provincial street is less important than a regional road, but more important than a strada comunale (Italian for "municipal road"). Municipal roads are maintained by municipalities (comuni). They can be roads owned by the comune (inside population centers) or roads managed by the comune (outside population centers). The general speed limit of municipal roads is 50 km/h (31 mph), but many municipalities have chosen to lower it to 30 km/h (19 mph) to increase safety for pedestrians and cyclists.

Italy was the first country in the world to build a motorway, defined as a road reserved for fast traffic and motor vehicles only. The Autostrada dei Laghi ("Lakes Motorway"), was the first to be built in the world, to connect Milan to Lake Como and Lake Maggiore. It was devised by Piero Puricelli and was inaugurated in 1924. Piero Puricelli, a civil engineer and entrepreneur, received the first authorization to build a public-utility fast road in 1921, and completed the construction (one lane in each direction) between 1924 and 1926. Piero Puricelli decided to cover the expenses by introducing a toll. The Lakes Motorway is now part of the Autostrada A8 and Autostrada A9.

== Background ==
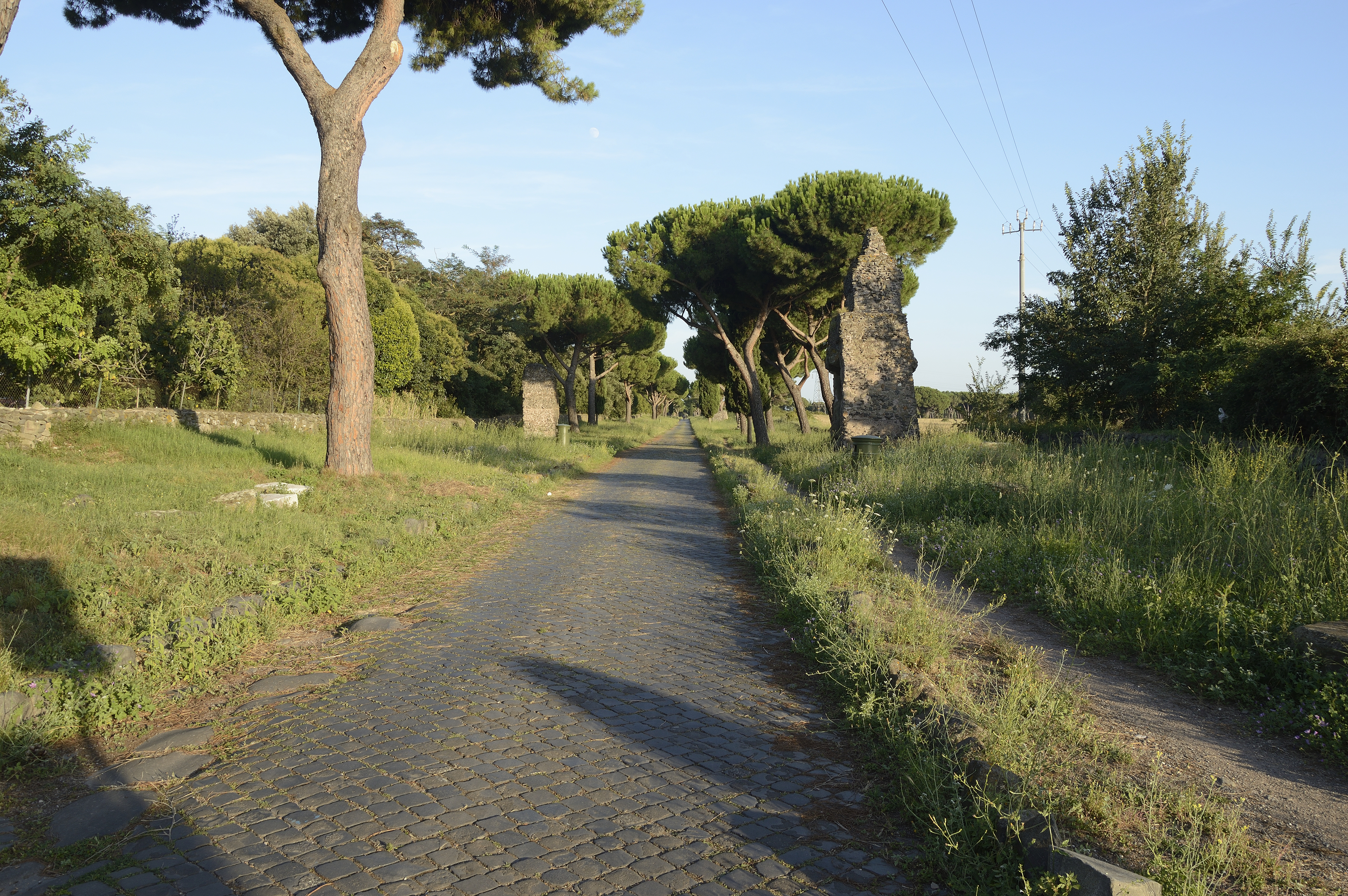
Ancient Roman Via Appia

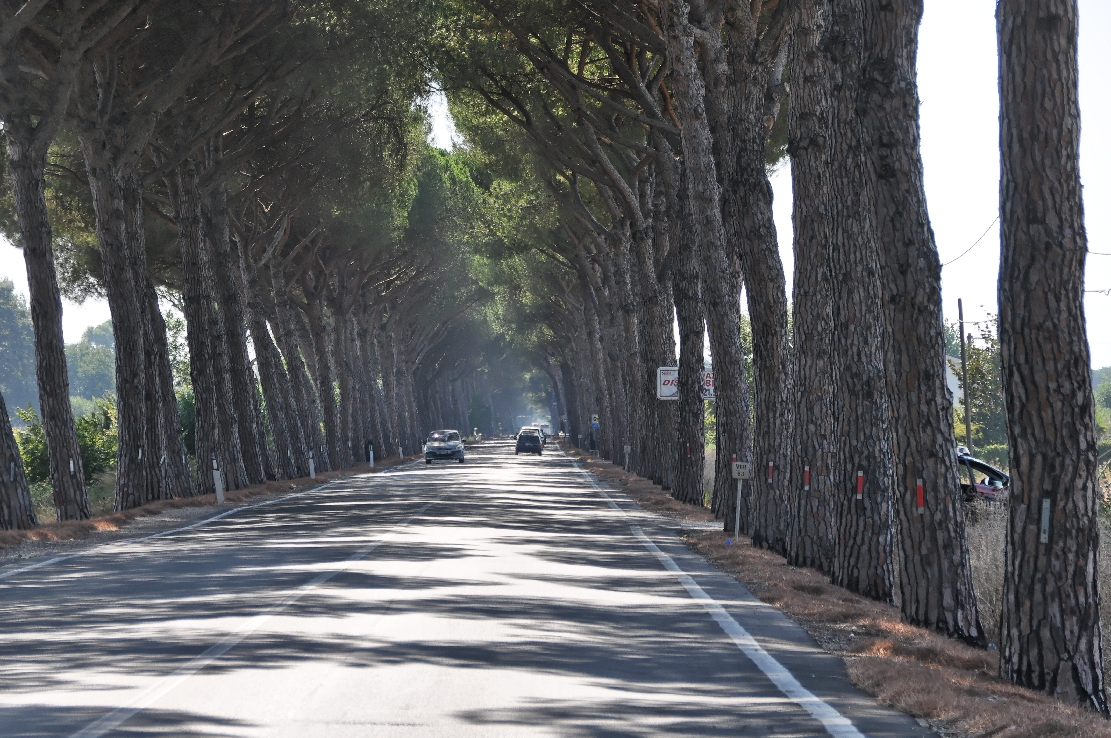
Nowadays Strada statale 7 Via Appia

Ancient Roman roads (Latin: viae Romanae [ˈwiae̯ roːˈmaːnae̯]; singular: via Romana [ˈwia roːˈmaːna]; meaning "Roman way") were physical infrastructure vital to the maintenance and development of the Roman state, and were built from about 300 BC through the expansion and consolidation of the Roman Republic and the Roman Empire. They provided efficient means for the overland movement of armies, officials, civilians, inland carriage of official communications, and commerce.

Roman roads were of several kinds, ranging from small local roads to broad, long-distance highways built to connect cities, major towns and military bases. These major roads were often stone-paved and metaled, cambered for drainage, and were flanked by footpaths, bridleways and drainage ditches. They were laid along accurately surveyed courses, and some were cut through hills, or conducted over rivers and ravines on bridgework. Sections could be supported over marshy ground on rafted or piled foundations.

The routes of some nowadays Italian state highways derive from ancient Roman roads, such as the Strada statale 7 Via Appia (Via Appia), the Strada statale 1 Via Aurelia (Via Aurelia) and the Strada statale 4 Via Salaria (Via Salaria).

== History ==
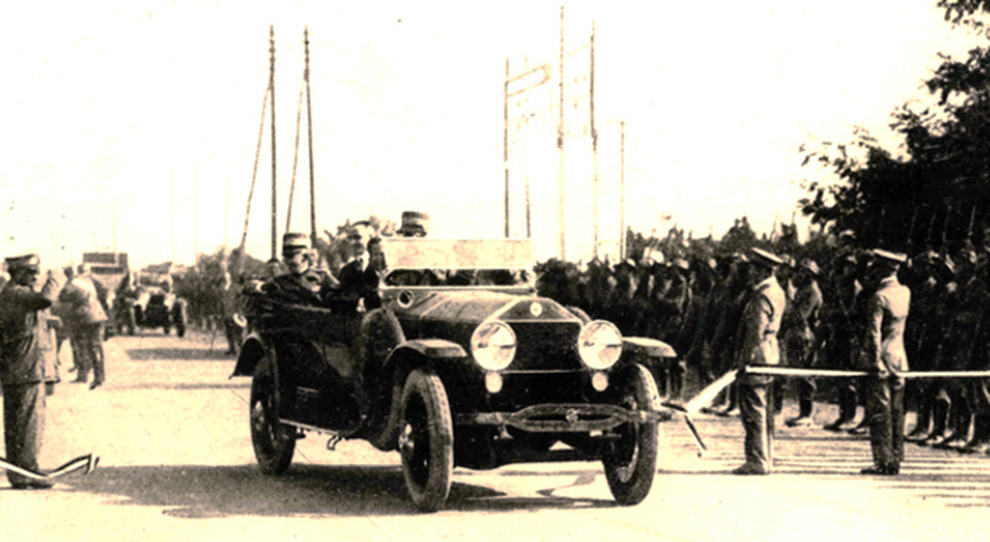
The King Victor Emmanuel III of Italy inaugurated the Autostrada dei Laghi ("Lakes Motorway"; now parts of the Autostrada A8 and Autostrada A9), the first motorway built in the world, on 21 September 1924, aboard the royal Lancia Trikappa.

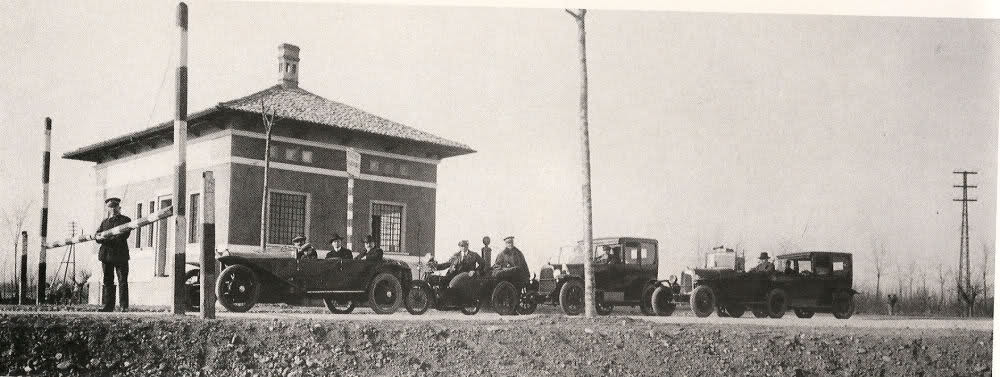
Toll gate of the Autostrada dei Laghi ("Lakes Motorway") in Milan in 1924

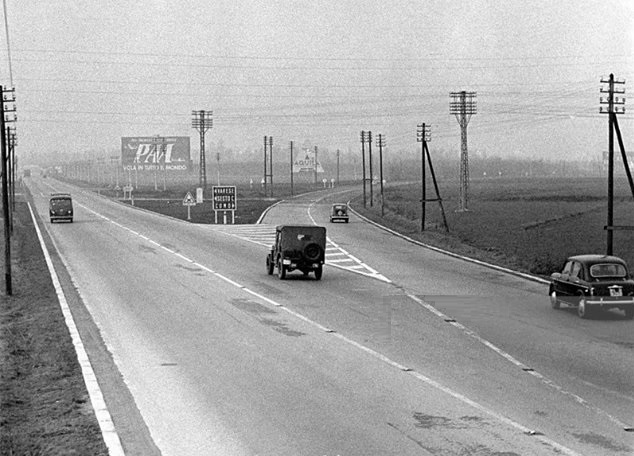
Autostrada dei Laghi ("Lakes Motorway") in the 1950s

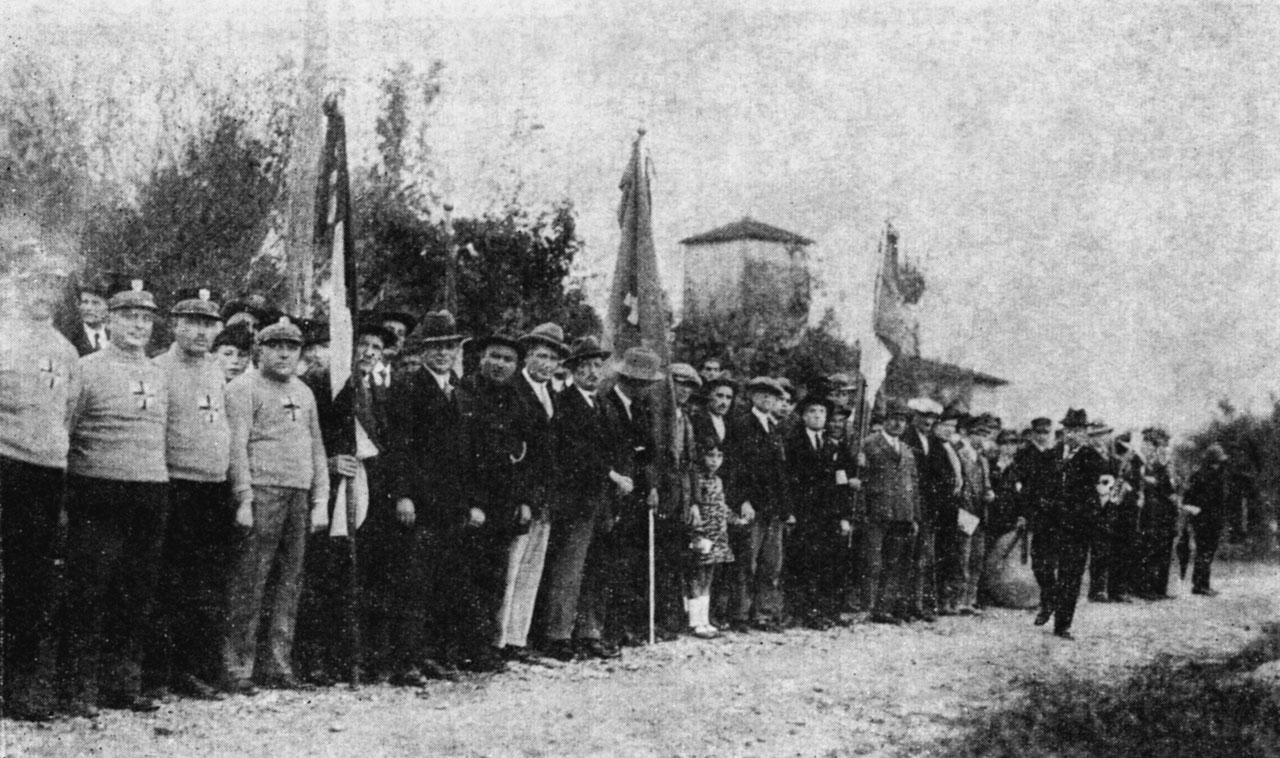
Foundation stone laying ceremony for the Florence-Mare motorway (the current Autostrada A11) in 1927

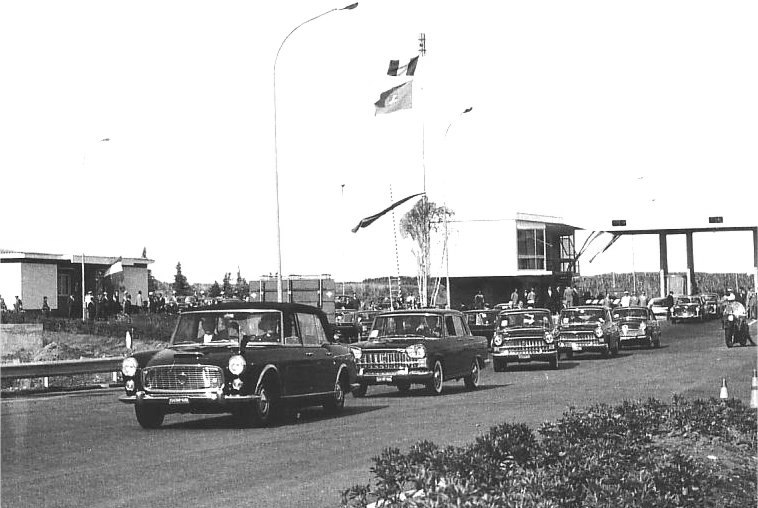
The President of Italy Antonio Segni inaugurated the Autostrada del Sole ("Sun Motorway"; now called Autostrada A1), on 4 October 1964, aboard the presidential Lancia Flaminia.

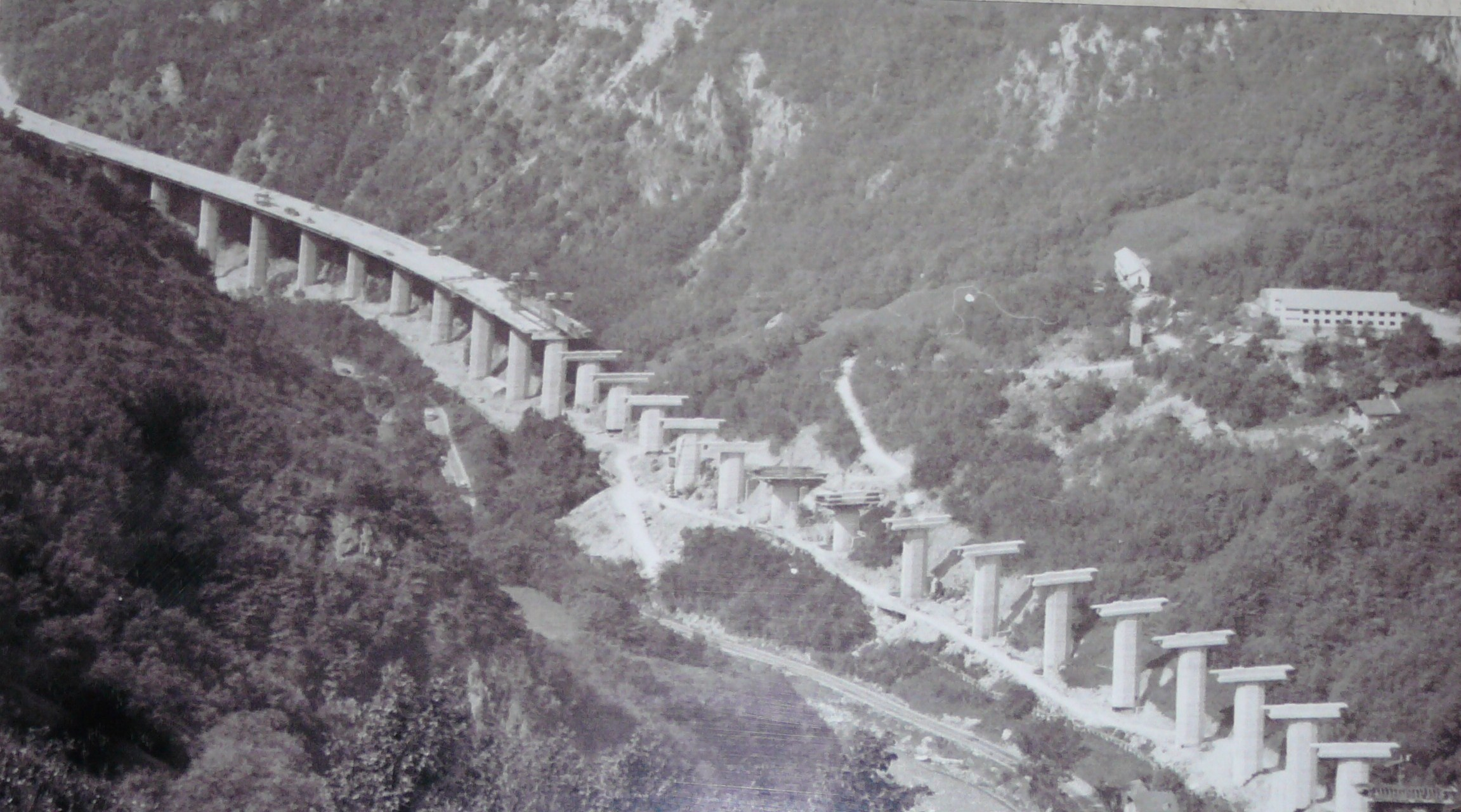
The construction of one of the many viaducts of the Autostrada A22 ("Brenner motorway") in the 1970s

Since the reforms following the birth of the Kingdom of Italy in 1861, the State took charge of the construction and maintenance of a primary network of roads to allow for connections between the main cities; in 1865 the Lanza law introduced the classification of roads as national, provincial or municipal. (see Annex F, art.10.) Following the works to extend the road network, the first revision of the list took place in 1884 with Royal Decree no. 2197.

In the following decades the State invested significantly in the construction of roads, particularly in the South, but these roads were progressively delegated to the provinces, paradoxically causing a reduction in the extension of the national road network in the face of a strong increase in provincial roads. Furthermore, the road network was considered complementary to the railway network, on which long-distance traffic travelled, to the point that for a long time there was a ban on classifying roads on routes already served by the railway as national.

The extension of the road network made it necessary in 1911 to update the list drawn up almost 30 years earlier, formalized with Royal Decree no. 221 which now included 84 national roads. The advent of the automobile, which required the availability of fast and well-paved roads, changed the situation, and in the immediate post-war period it was decided to revisit the issue.

The royal decree n. 2506 (published in the Gazzetta Ufficiale of 4 December 1923 no. 284) classified the roads into 5 classes. However, the 1923 reform did not resolve the issue about road management, and was, in the end, not implemented. The growing centralization of power of the fascist regime however led to the definitive affirmation of the centralist management model, which culminated in 1928 with the creation of the Azienda Autonoma Statale della Strada (AASS) (law 17 May 1928, n. 1094, Official Gazette n. 127 of 05/31/1928); which would later become ANAS in 1946.

Italy was the first country in the world to build a motorway, defined as a road reserved for fast traffic and motor vehicles only. The Autostrada dei Laghi ("Lakes Motorway"), was the first to be built in the world, to connect Milan to Lake Como and Lake Maggiore. It was devised by Piero Puricelli and was inaugurated in 1924. Piero Puricelli, a civil engineer and entrepreneur, received the first authorization to build a public-utility fast road in 1921, and completed the construction (one lane in each direction) between 1924 and 1926. Piero Puricelli decided to cover the expenses by introducing a toll. The Lakes Motorway is now part of the Autostrada A8 and Autostrada A9.

It was a futuristic project, because there were few cars circulating in Italy at that time. In 1923 there were a total of 53,000 cars circulating on Italian roads. In 1927 there were 135,900 cars circulating in Italy, corresponding to one vehicle for every 230 inhabitants, while today the ratio is 1 car for every 1.6 inhabitants. The most motorized Italian regions were those of northern Italy and central Italy, with Lombardy at the top of the list with over 38,700 cars in 1923, while at the bottom of the list was Basilicata with 502 cars. Milan was the Italian city in which the most car licenses were issued annually (12,000 in 1928), while the Italian region where the fewest licenses were issued was Sardinia, with only 632 new licenses.

In 1927 the Milan-Bergamo motorway was opened (part of the current Autostrada A4) whose concessionary company was owned by Piero Puricelli. In 1929 the Naples-Pompei motorway (part of the current Autostrada A3) was inaugurated, while in 1931 the Brescia-Bergamo motorway (part of the current Autostrada A4) was inaugurated. In 1932 the Turin-Milan motorway (part of the current Autostrada A4) was opened. In 1933 the Florence-Mare motorway (the current Autostrada A11) and the Padua-Venice motorway (part of the current Autostrada A4) were opened. In 1935, after 3 years of work, the Genoa-Serravalle Scrivia (the current Autostrada A7) was opened. In 1939, a year before Italy entered into the World War II, the construction of the Genoa-Savona motorway (the current Autostrada A10) was approved.

The first official regulatory definition of a motorway dates back only to 1933 with Royal Decree no. 1740 of 1933 which defined a motorway as a road reserved for motor vehicles only. The legislative decree 17 April 1948, n. 547 then defined motorways "as those communication routes reserved for paid transit of motor vehicles, built and operated by the A.N.A.S. or by private individuals, with or without State contributions". In 1955 the Romita law was promulgated by the Senate and the Chamber of Deputies and it contemplated that the motorway network must be present in all regions. Also in 1955, work began on the Genoa-Savona and the doubling of other single carriageway motorways thanks to the financing law no. 1328/1955. The law of 7 February 1961, n. 59 defined motorways "as those communication routes exclusively reserved for the selected transit, usually for a fee, of motor vehicles and motorbikes, without level crossings or in any case unattended, which are recognized as such by decree of the Minister for Public Works".

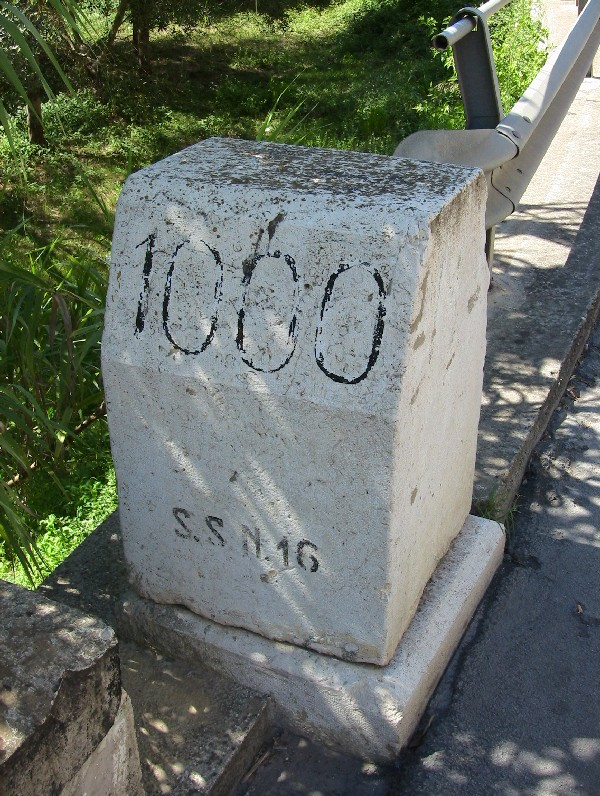
Old milestone at km 1,000 on the state highway number 16

Starting from the mid-1960s, ANAS also began to build a network of dual carriageways which often flanked or completed the routes of the state highways, but did not formally replace them. These roads, initially called in the most disparate ways, were subsequently cataloged under the name of new road ANAS (NSA), also followed by a progressive number. The law of 12 February 1958, n. 126 as amended by law no. 167 of 9 April 1971, classified roads as state (main communication and ordinary), provincial, municipal, local and military.

In 1961, by Law 24 July 1961 n. 729, the construction of the Adriatica (Autostrada A14), Naples-Canosa (Autostrada A16) and Caserta-Salerno (Autostrada A30) motorways was approved. The same law provided for the construction of motorway junctions. Also in the 1960s, the first automatic pay stations were introduced for paying tolls only with coins. In 1964, the Autostrada A1 Milan-Rome was completed, the first dual carriageway motorway in the world with sections also in the mountains. In 1973 the first motorway in Sicily (the Autostrada A18) was inaugurated. In the 1970s the Grande Raccordo Anulare was classified as a motorway.

In 1975, law 492 was promulgated (in force until the 1990s) which provides for the blocking of motorway construction due to the oil crisis. Until 1992 with the previous Italian traffic code the technical standards in force were those of the CNR 78/80 standard of the C.N.R. Official Bulletin. n. 78 of 28 July 1980. In 2001, as a consequence of the autonomist reforms of the late 1990s, many state highways were handed over to the regions, and from them to the provinces; the State kept for itself only a skeleton of fundamental roads, as well as those leading to the main border posts with other States. From a classification point of view, this has led to an extreme and confusing variety of new acronyms and street numbers, carried out independently by each local authority without a common criterion; consequently, in common usage the roads have often continued to be identified as "former state highway number...".

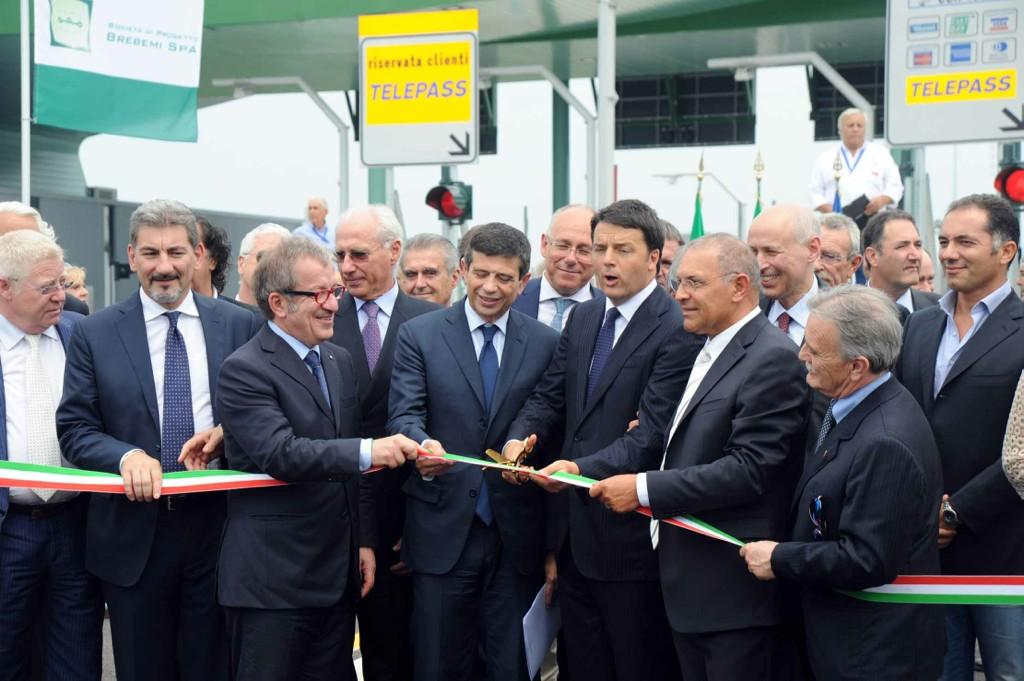
Inauguration ceremony of the Autostrada A35 on 23 July 2014

In 1997 work began on the modernization of the Salerno-Reggio Calabria motorway. Completed in 2017, it was then renamed Autostrada A2, to replace the old name which then remained only for the Naples-Salerno section. In 2001, with the doubling of the Autostrada A6, all motorways in Italy are dual carriageways. In 2009 the Mestre bypass was opened (classified as Autostrada A4). Between 2014 and 2015, the Autostrada A35, Autostrada A36, Autostrada A58, Autostrada A59, and Autostrada A60 motorways were opened. In March 2022, the 3-lane section of the Autostrada A1 southbound between Barberino di Mugello and Calenzano was opened, which - although not officially - constitutes the natural continuation of the Variante di Valico; in this stretch the Santa Lucia tunnel is crossed which, at 7.724 kilometres (4.799 mi), is the longest 3-lane tunnel in Europe.

Since 2018, faced with the difficulty of many local authorities in guaranteeing the maintenance of former state highways, a "road return" project was launched which involves the return of almost 7,000 km of roads to ANAS, staggered in two phases. Consequently, these roads have once again assumed the pre-existing state highway numbering already removed in 2001.

== Technical classification ==
=== Motorways ===
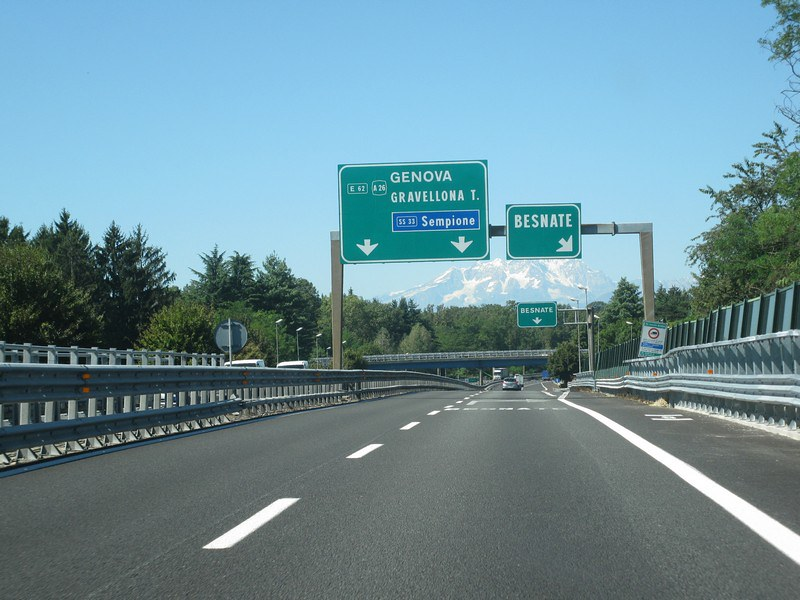
The Autostrada dei Laghi ("Lakes Motorway"; now parts of the Autostrada A8 and the Autostrada A9), the first motorway built in the world.

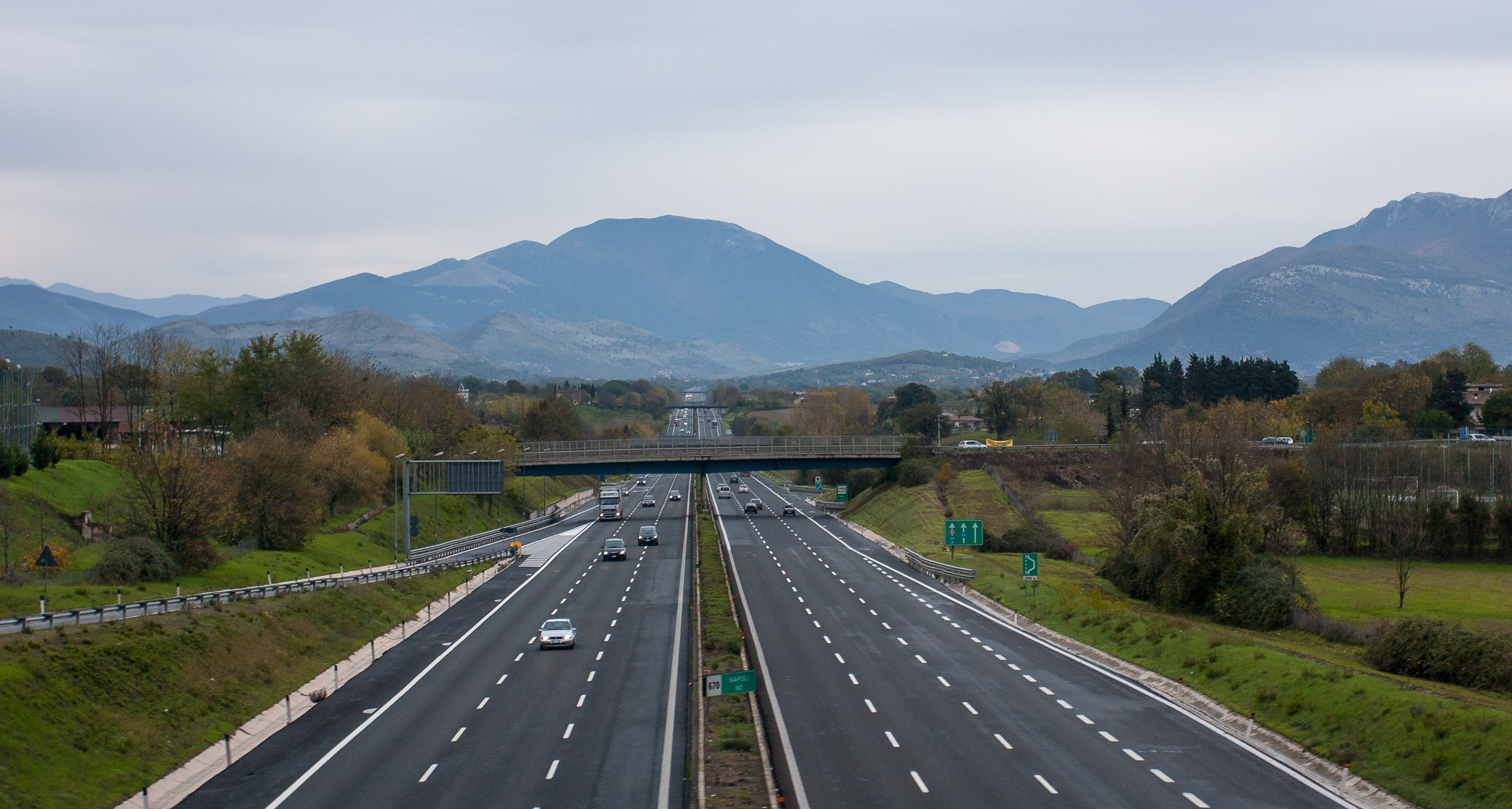
Autostrada A1 runs through Italy linking some of the largest cities of the country: Milan, Bologna, Florence, Rome and Naples.

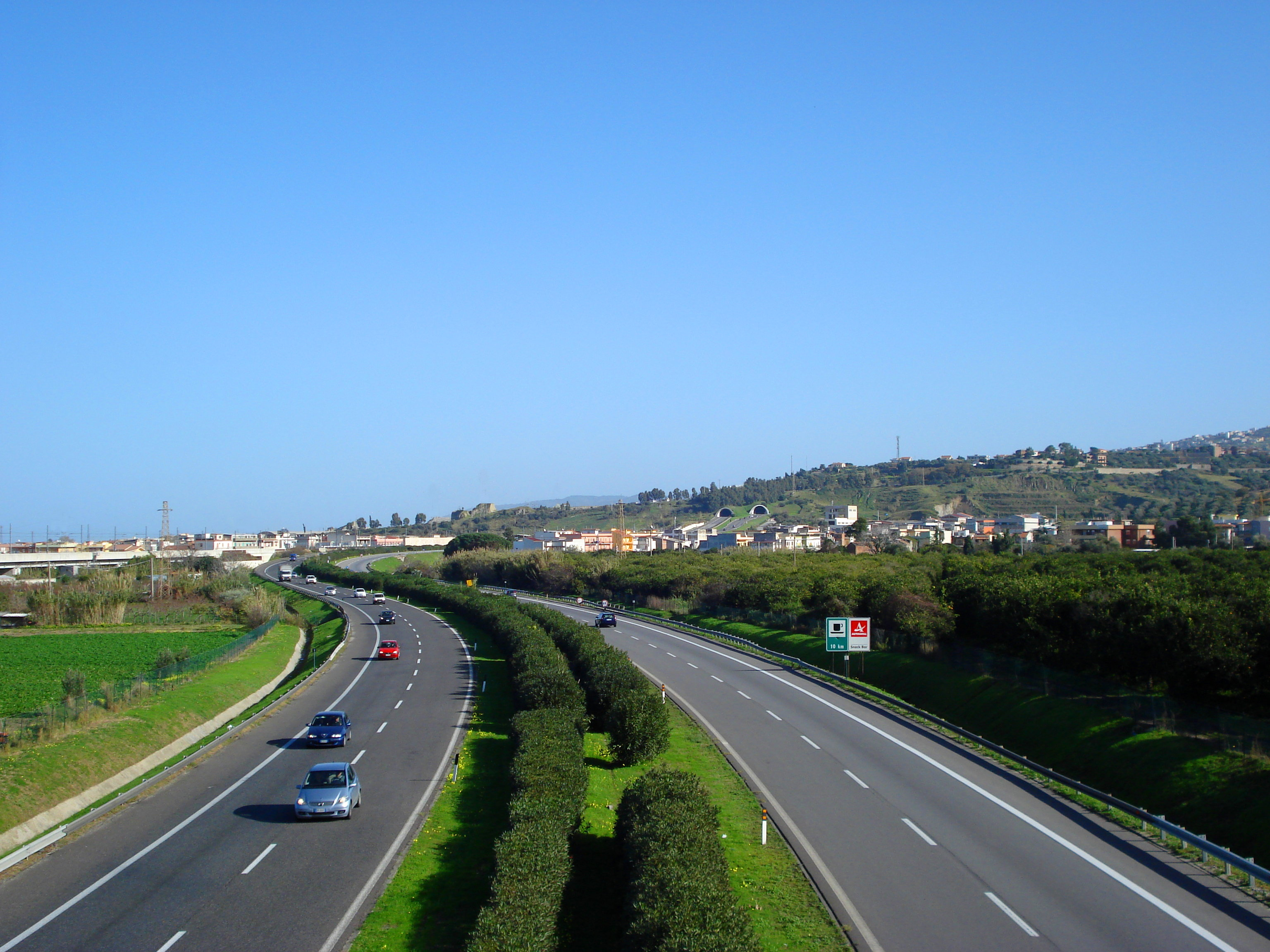
Autostrada A20 runs through the island of Sicily linking Palermo to Messina.

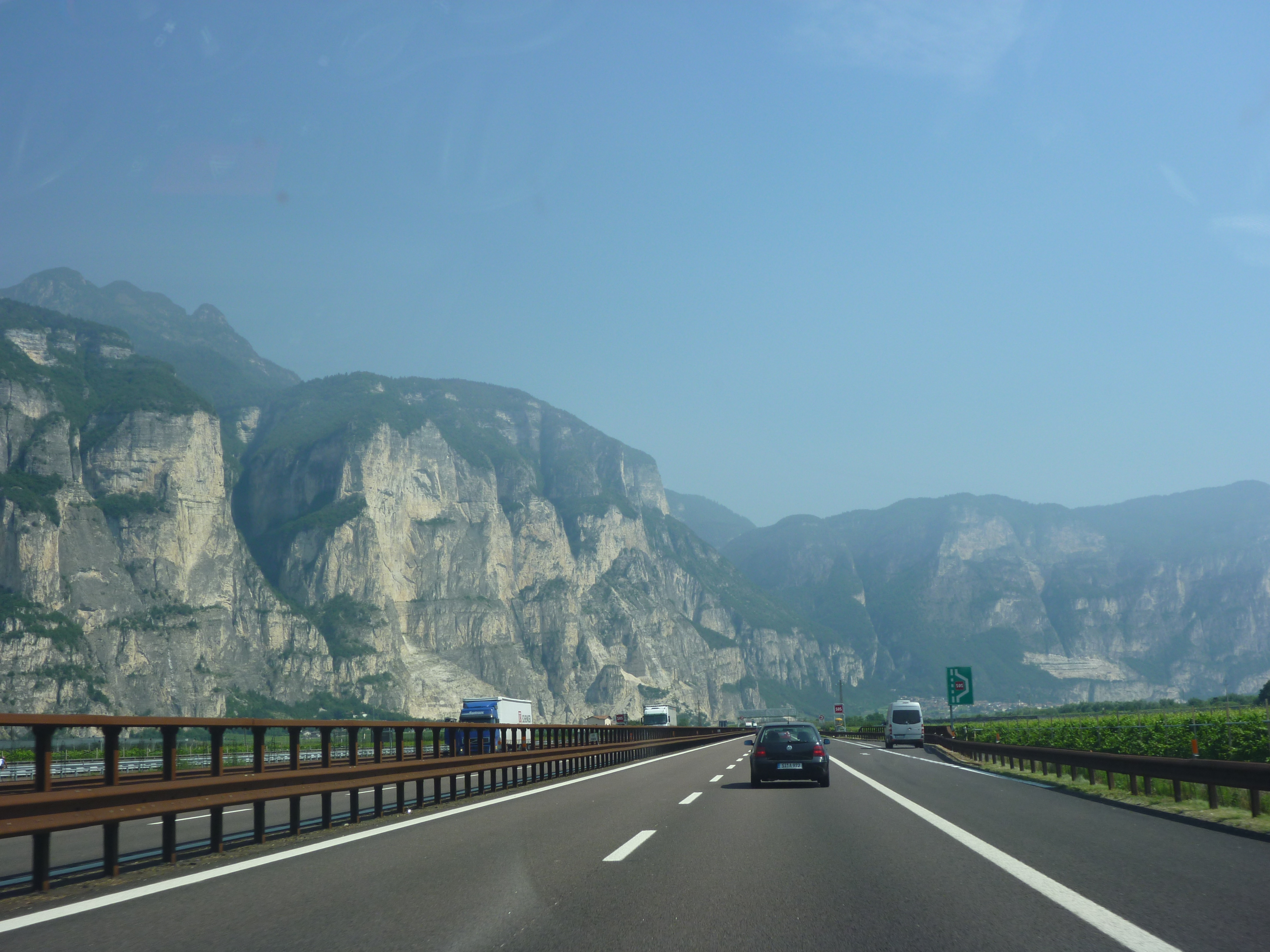
Autostrada A22 runs through Po Valley and Alps linking Modena to Brenner Pass, a mountain pass which forms the border between Italy and Austria.

Italy was the first country in the world to build motorways, the so-called autostrade, reserved for fast traffic and for motor vehicles only. The Autostrada dei Laghi ("Lakes Motorway"), the first built in the world, connecting Milan to Lake Como and Lake Maggiore, and now parts of the Autostrada A8 and the Autostrada A9, was devised by Piero Puricelli and was inaugurated in 1924.

Other motorways (or autostrade) built before World War II in Italy were Naples-Pompeii, Florence-Pisa, Padua-Venice, Milan-Turin, Milan-Bergamo-Brescia and Rome-Ostia. The total length of the Italian motorway system is about 7,016 km (4,360 mi), as of 30 July 2022. To these data are added 13 motorway spur routes, which extend for 355 km (221 mi). The density is 22.4 km (13.9 mi) of motorway for every 1,000 square kilometres (390 sq mi) of Italian territory.

In particular, 1,870.2 km (1,162.1 mi) of the Italian motorway network have three lanes per carriageway, 129 km (80 mi) km have four lanes per carriageway, 1.8 km (1.1 mi) have five lanes per carriageway, while the remaining part is two lanes per carriageway. The density is 22.4 km (13.9 mi) of motorway for every 1,000 km^{2} (390 sq mi) of Italian territory.

Italian motorways (or autostrade) are mostly managed by concessionaire companies. From 1 October 2012 the granting body is the Ministry of Infrastructure and Transport and no longer Anas and the majority (5,773.4 km (3,587.4 mi) in 2009) are subject to toll payments. On Italian motorways, the toll applies to almost all motorways not managed by Anas. The collection of motorway tolls, from a tariff point of view, is managed mainly in two ways: either through the "closed motorway system" (km travelled) or through the "open motorway system" (flat-rate toll).

Italy's motorways (or autostrade) have a standard speed limit of 130 km/h (80 mph) for cars. Limits for other vehicles (or when visibility is poor due to weather) are lower. Legal provisions allow operators to set the limit to 150 km/h (95 mph) on their concessions on a voluntary basis if there are three lanes in each direction and a working SICVE, or Safety Tutor, which is a speed-camera system that measures the average speed over a given distance.

In order for a road to be classified as an autostrada, various geometric and construction conditions must be satisfied and these, although very similar in basis (for example the width of the travel lanes must be 3.75 m (12.3 ft)) are not constant: there are different technical-legal regulations for motorways built in urban or extra-urban areas.

Autostrade are mostly managed by concessionaire companies. In North and Central Italy, the Autostrade mainly consists of tollways managed by Autostrade per l'Italia, a holding company controlled by Cassa Depositi e Prestiti. Other operators include ASTM, ATP, and Autostrade Lombarde in the north-west; Autostrada del Brennero, A4 Holding, Concessioni Autostradali Venete, and Autovie Venete in the north-east; Strada dei Parchi, SALT, SAT, and Autocisa in the center; and CAS in the south.

=== Extra-urban roads ===
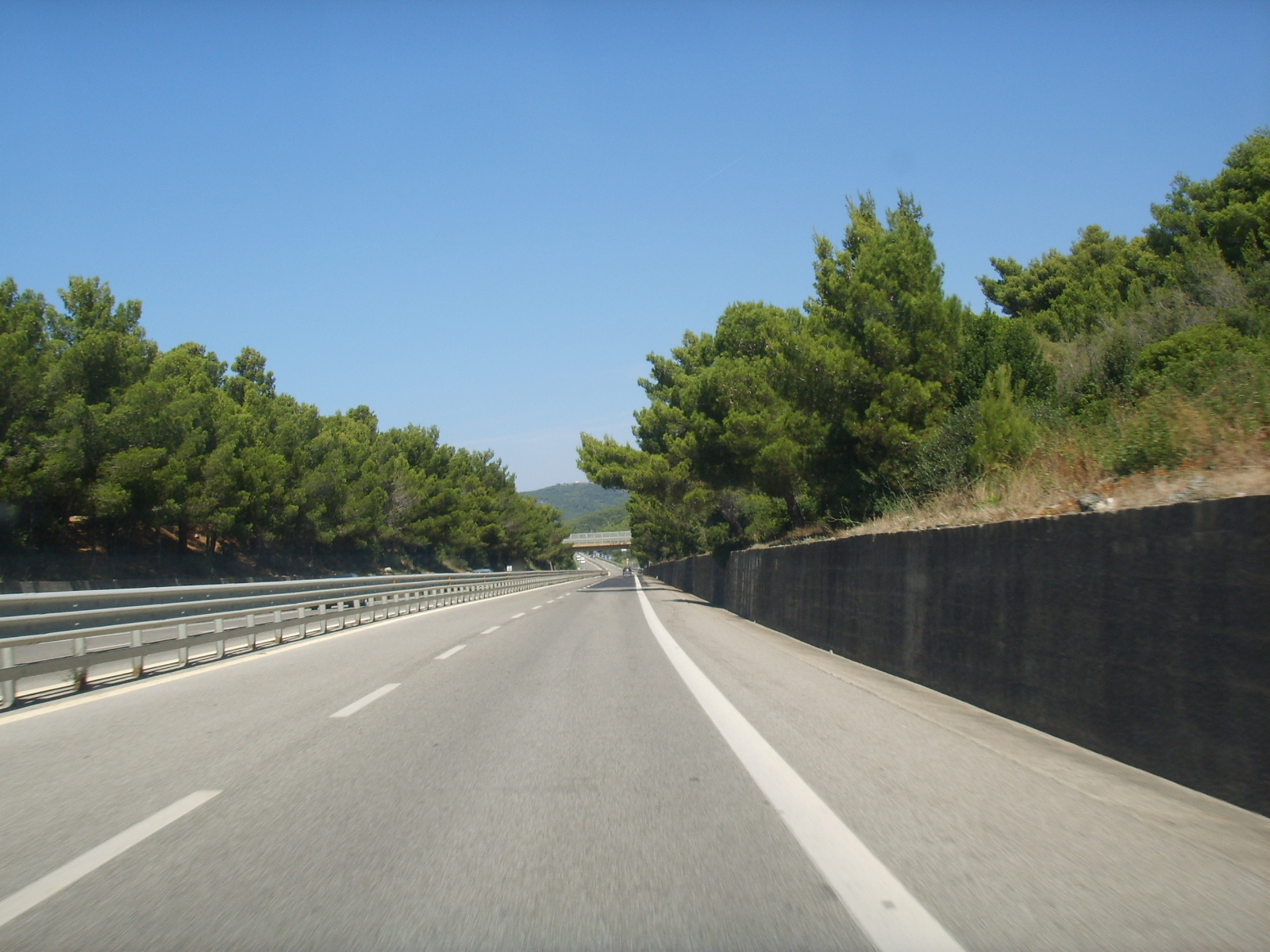
The stretch from Grosseto to Livorno of the Strada statale 1 Via Aurelia is classified as strada extraurbana principale.

In Italy, a dual carriageway is often called superstrada (meaning expressway), but this name is unofficial. Italian traffic code (Codice della strada) divides extra-urban dual carriageways into two different classifications:

- strada extraurbana principale (meaning main highway) or type-B road: a road with separate carriageways, at least two lanes for each direction, paved shoulder on the right and no cross-traffic. This type of road is quite similar to an autostrada or type-A road (Italian official name for motorways or freeways), but its building standards are lower. Access limitations and drive behaviour on type-B roads are the same as the motorways (no pedestrians, bicycles and other slow vehicles), as well as the signage (except for the background color, that is blue instead of green). Speed limits on type-B roads are up to 110 km/h (70 mph). Type-B roads are always toll-free.
- strada extraurbana secondaria (meaning secondary road) or type-C road. This category contains all the roads in non-urban context that are neither autostrada (type A) nor strada extraurbana principale (type B). This means that a dual carriageway that may not be classified as type-B road, since it does not meet such quality standards, belongs to this category. For type-C roads, there are neither special signage nor access restrictions, unless a specific sign is placed. The speed limit is 90 km/h (55 mph), on both single and dual carriageways.

=== Urban roads ===
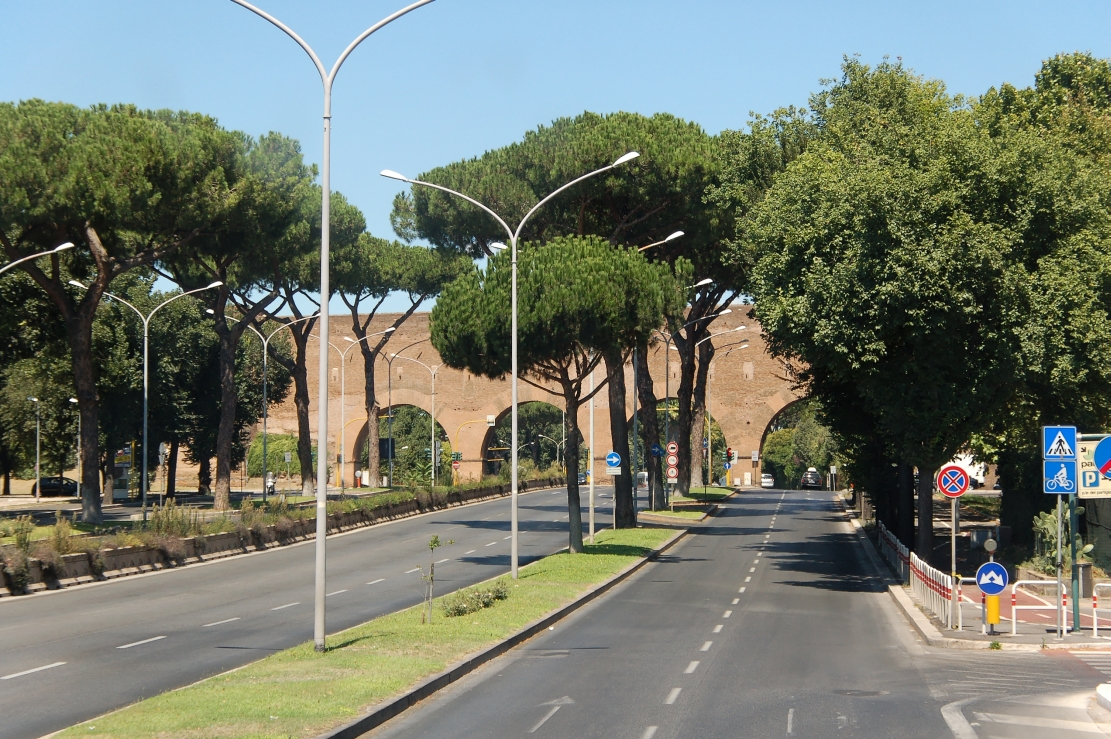
Via Cristoforo Colombo at Porta Ardeatina in Rome, classified as strada urbana di scorrimento

These are the roads present within inhabited centers. Urban roads are of three types:

- strada urbana di scorrimento (meaning urban expressway) or type-D road: a road in urban context, with separate carriageways, and at least two lanes for each direction. At-level junctions with smaller roads, regulated by traffic lights, are allowed as well as roundabouts. Unless a prohibition sign is placed, there are not access restrictions. Speed limits on this type of road are up to 70 km/h (45 mph).
- strada urbana di quartiere (meaning urban neighborhood road) or type E road: single carriageway road with at least two lanes, paved shoulders and sidewalks; for parking there are areas equipped with a special maneuvering lane, outside the roadway;
  - strada urbana ciclabile (meaning urban cycle road) or type E-bis road: urban road with a single carriageway, with paved shoulders and sidewalks, with a speed limit of no more than 30 km/h, defined by specific vertical and horizontal signs, with priority for bicycles.
- strada locale (meaning local road) or type F road: urban or extra-urban road not belonging to the other types of roads;
  - strada vicinale: is a privately owned road of local interest located outside the town centre. In Italy the local road is a de facto communication route built to access a series of plots of land, or generally to connect to a road.
  - itinerario ciclopedonale (meaning cycle/pedestrian itinerary) or type F-bis road: local, urban, extra-urban or local road, mainly intended for pedestrian and cycle travel, and characterized by intrinsic safety to protect vulnerable road users.

== Administrative classification ==
=== State roads ===
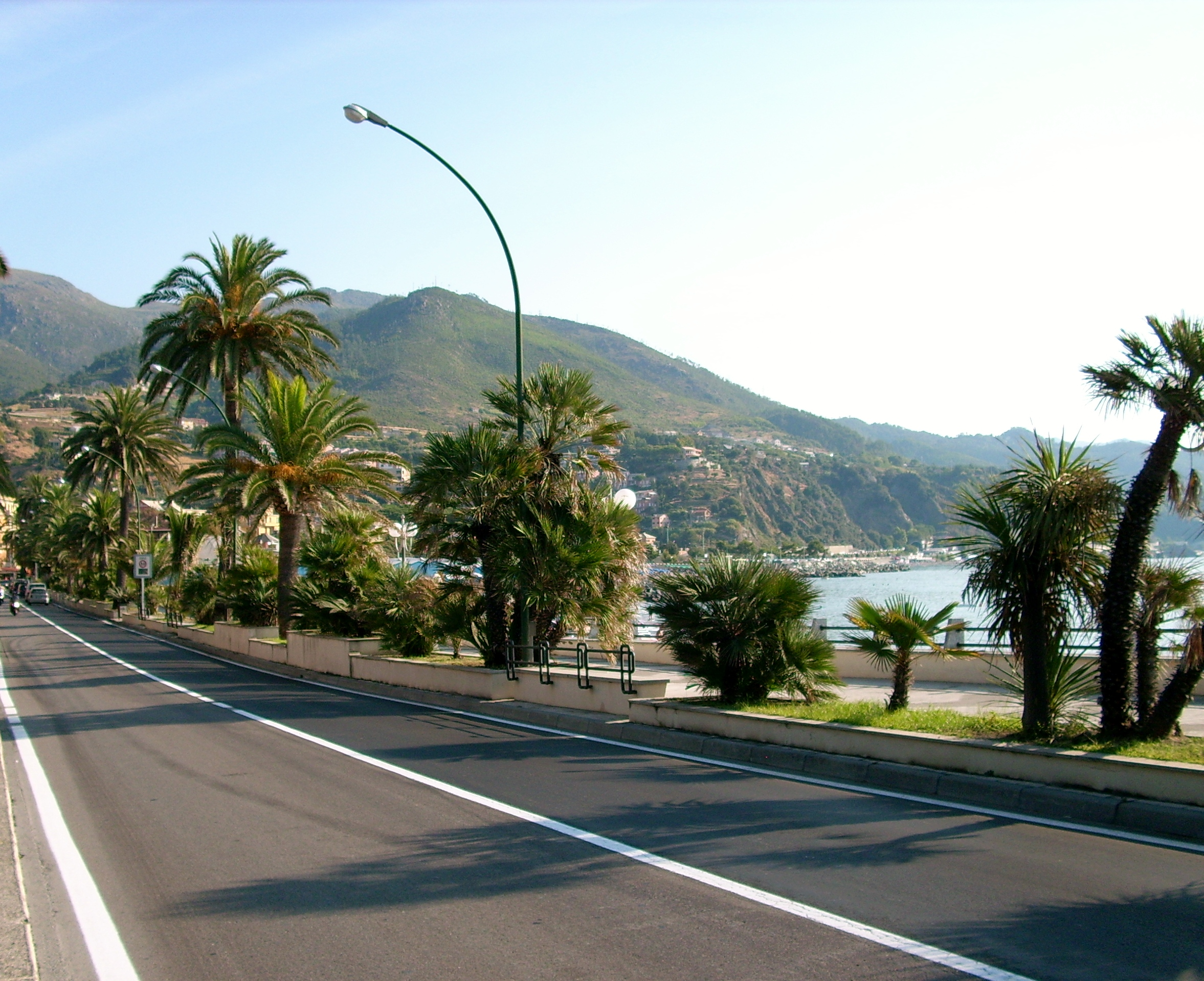
Strada statale 1 Via Aurelia

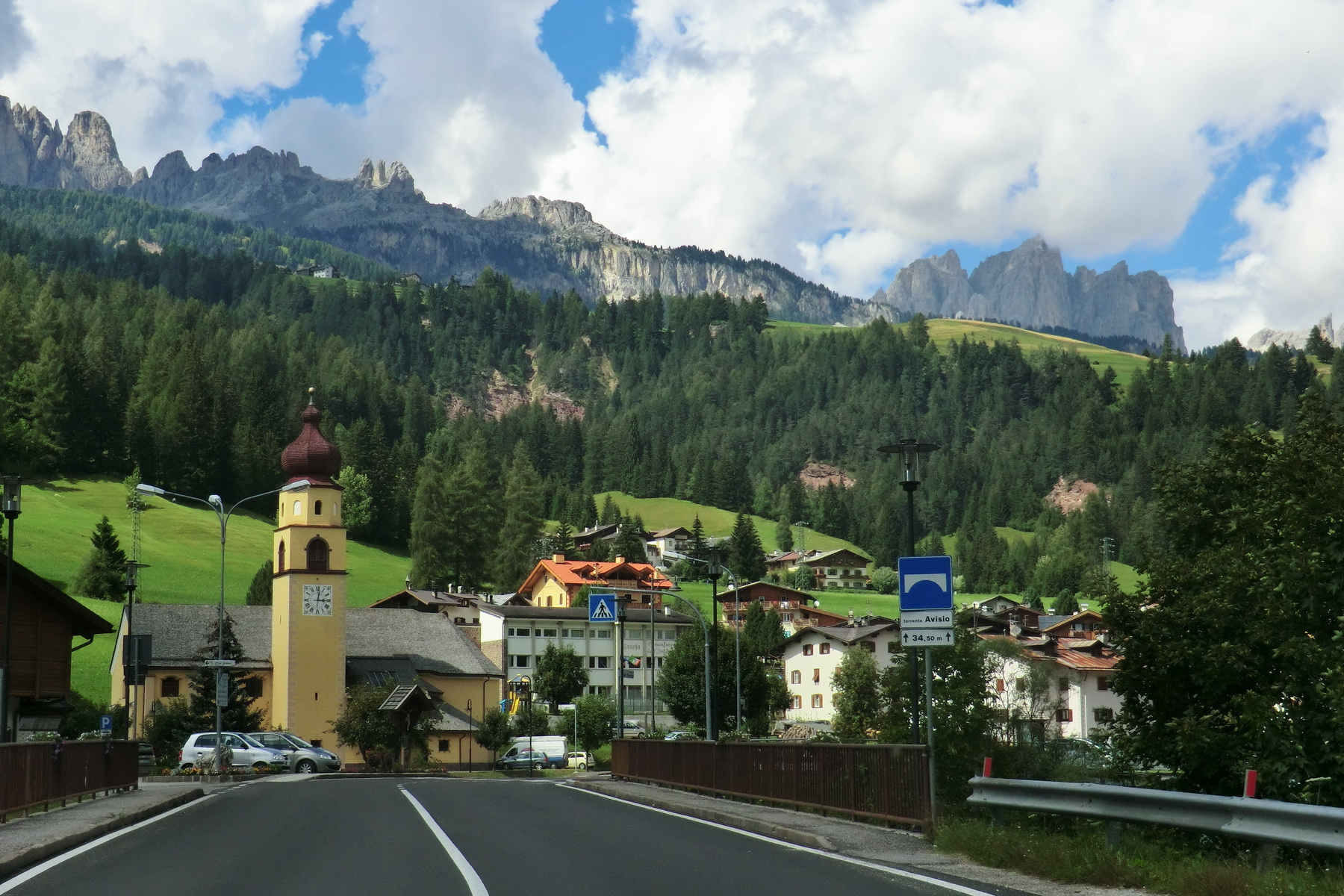
Strada statale 48 delle Dolomiti

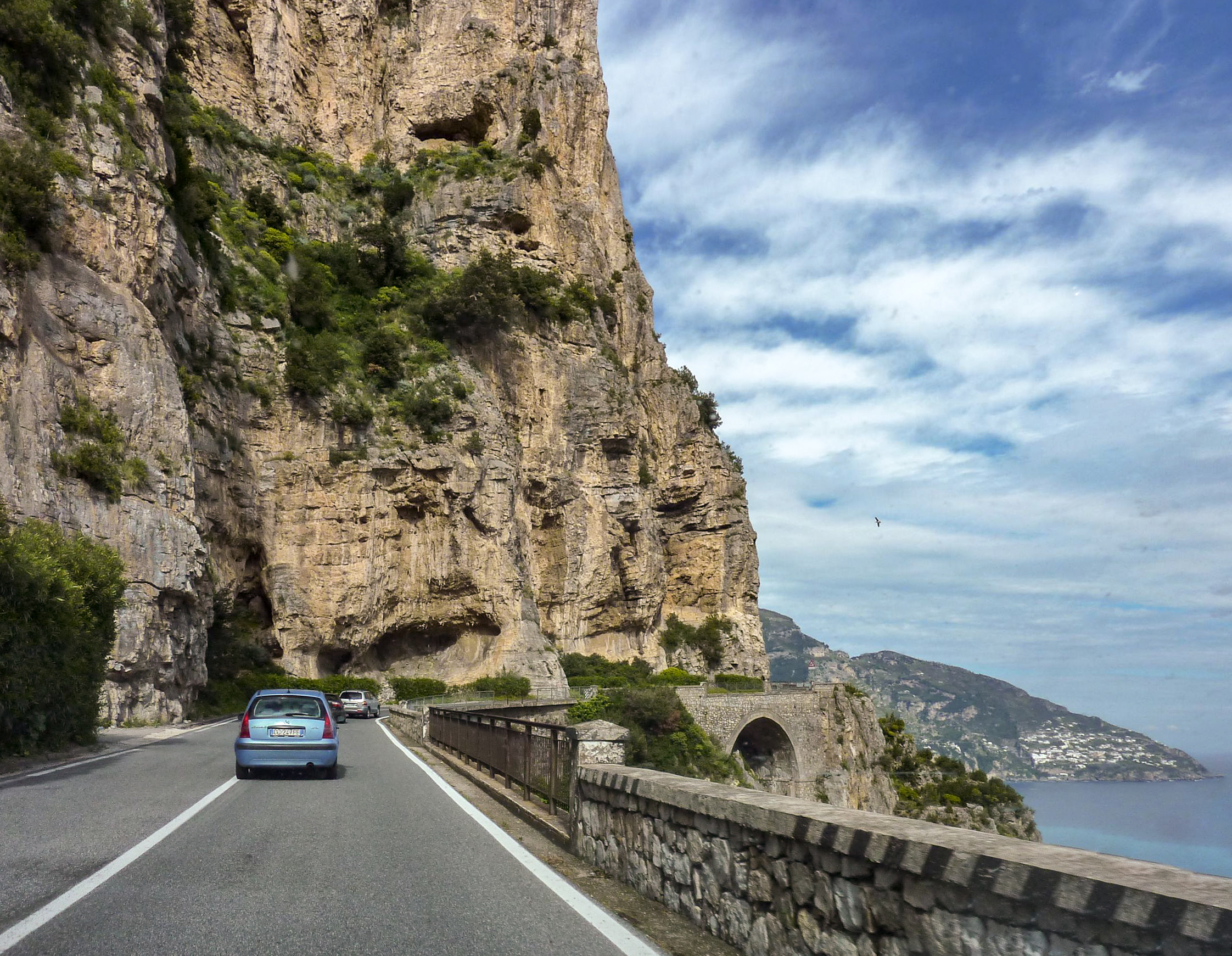
Strada statale 163 Amalfitana

The Strade Statali (Italian: [ˈstraːde staˈtaːli]; sing. Strada Statale [ˈstraːda staˈtaːle]), abbreviated "SS", is the Italian national network of state highways. The total length for this network is about 25,000 km (16,000 mi). The Italian state highway network are maintained by ANAS. From 1928 until 1946 state highways were maintained by Azienda Autonoma Statale della Strada (AASS). The routes of some state highways derive from ancient Roman roads, such as the Strada statale 7 Via Appia, which broadly follows the route of the Roman road of the same name.

State highway classification is an administrative classification. The Italian traffic code defines roads as such that:

- they constitute the major routes of national traffic;
- they connect the main road network of the State with those of neighboring States;
- they connect regional capitals or provincial capitals located in different regions, or constitute direct and important connections between state highways;
- they connect sea ports, airports and centers of particular industrial, tourist and climatic importance to the state highway network;
- they serve interregional traffic or are of particular interest for the economy of vast areas of the national territory.

State highways can be technically defined as main extra-urban roads (type B road) or as secondary extra-urban roads (type C road). State highways that cross towns with a population of at least 10,000 inhabitants are urban roads (type D and E) under the jurisdiction of the relevant comuni. The state highway that cross towns or villages with a population of less than 10,000 inhabitants are urban roads (type D and E) under the jurisdiction of the comune, subject to authorization from ANAS.

The Italian state highway network has approximately 25,000 km (16,000 mi) of roads identified with the acronym SS. The body that manages these roads, with full state participation, is ANAS (National Autonomous Roads Company), founded in 1946, on the ashes of the old AASS (Autonomous State Roads Company) which in turn was established in 1928. Due to urbanization processes, it has abandoned some sections of state highways, following their acquisition by the interested comuni, who now take care of their maintenance.

Notable state highways in Italy are the Strada statale 1 Via Aurelia, the Strada statale 4 Via Salaria, the Strada statale 4 dir, Strada statale 7 Via Appia, the Strada statale 12 dell'Abetone e del Brennero, the Strada statale 18 Tirrena Inferiore, the Strada statale 35 dei Giovi, the Strada statale 36 del Lago di Como e dello Spluga, the Strada statale 37 del Maloja, the Strada statale 38 dello Stelvio, the Strada statale 44 del Passo di Giovo, the Strada statale 44 bis Passo del Rombo, the Strada statale 48 delle Dolomiti, the Strada statale 72 di San Marino, the Strada statale 106 Jonica, the Strada statale 115 Sud Occidentale Sicula, the Strada statale 125 Orientale Sarda, the Strada statale 131 Carlo Felice, the Strada statale 131 Diramazione Centrale Nuorese, the Strada statale 148 Pontina, the Strada statale 163 Amalfitana, the Strada statale 336 dell'Aeroporto della Malpensa and the Strada statale 407 Basentana.

==== New road ANAS ====
Starting from the mid-1960s, ANAS also began to build a network of dual carriageways which often flanked or completed the routes of the state highways, but did not formally replace them. These roads, initially called in the most disparate ways, were subsequently cataloged under the name of nuove strade ANAS (Italian for "new roads ANAS"), also followed by a progressive number. Over time, many of the new ANAS roads were then reclassified as state highways, either as a new route of an existing state highway, or as a new state highway in its own right with a new number.

=== Regional roads ===
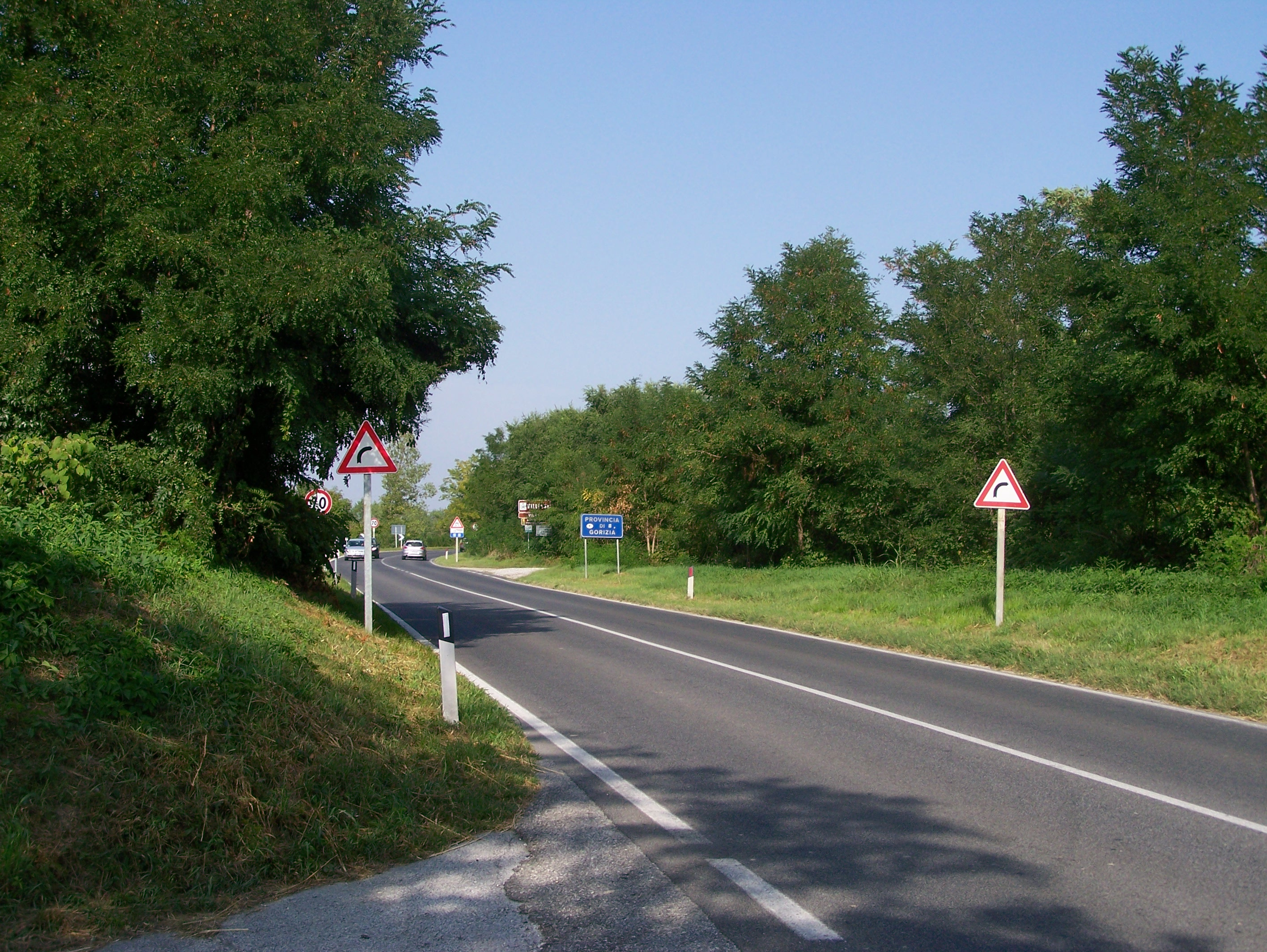
Regional road number 351 (SR 351) in Friuli-Venezia Giulia

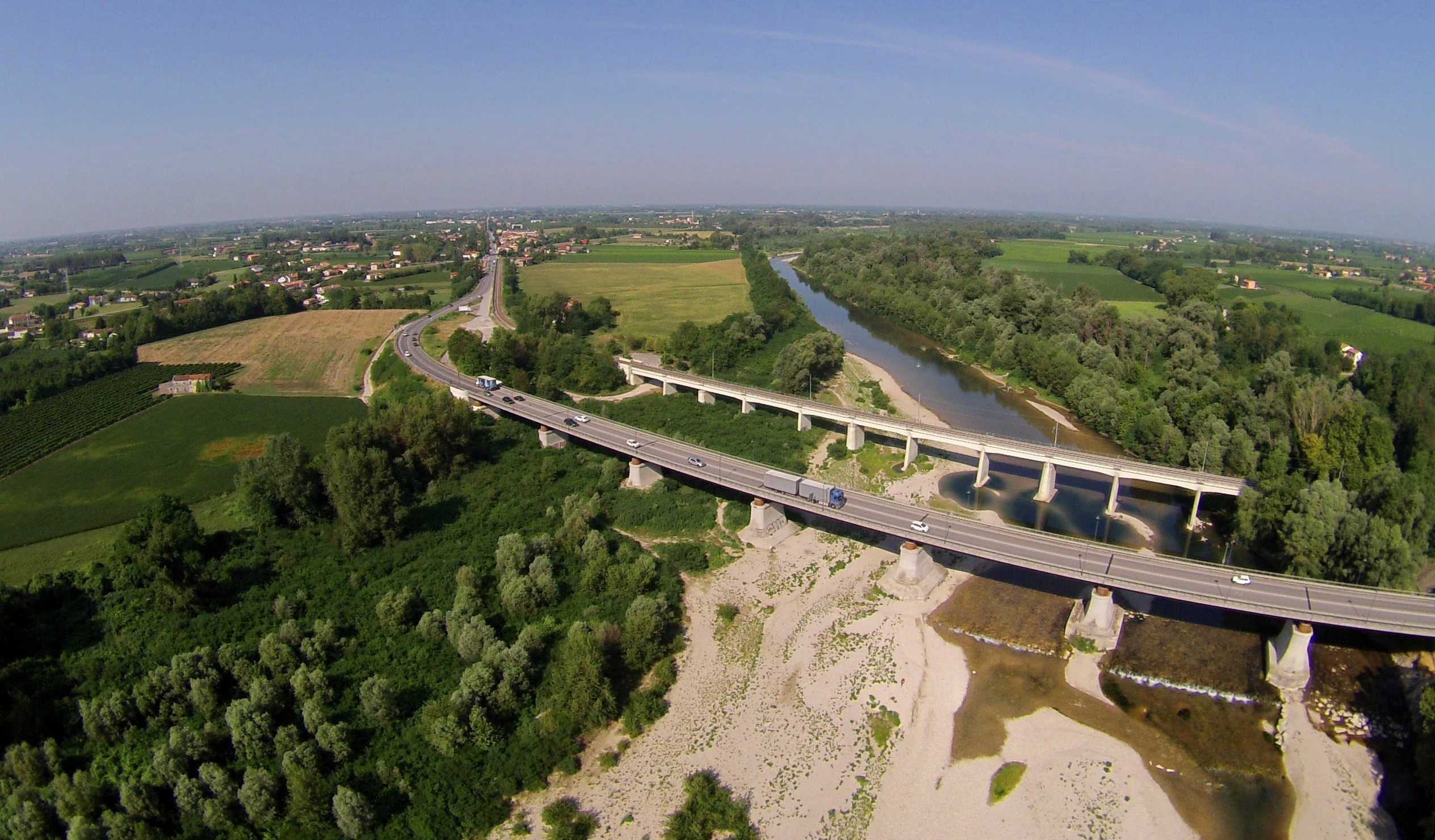
Regional road number 53 (SR 53) in Veneto

A Strada Regionale (Italian for "regional road"; pl. "strade regionali"), abbreviated SR, is a type of Italian road maintained by the regions they traverse. A regional road is less important than a state highway, but more important than a provincial road. The concept of regional road was introduced for the first time in Italy, limited to the autonomous region of Aosta Valley (where no provincial body exists), with regional law no. 1 of 10 October 1950. The concept was then extended to a national level by legislative decree nº 285 of 30 April 1992 (New Italian Traffic Law) which defines it as:

Regional road: when it connects the provincial capitals of the same region to each other or with the regional capital or connects the provincial capitals or municipalities with the state network if this is particularly relevant for industrial, commercial, agricultural, tourist and climate.

— Italian Traffic Law

The first roads (excluding Aosta Valley) classified as SR (acronym for strada regionale; "regional road") were created following legislative decree no. 112 of 1998, in 2001. In particular, articles 99 and 101 provided for the transfer of ownership and responsibilities relating to state highways not included in the national road network from the State to the regions, which then regulated the matter autonomously. For organizational reasons, many regions have entrusted the former state highways to the provinces, while maintaining the acronym SR.

In addition to these regional roads created following the downgrading of the state network, there are regional roads immediately classified as such (for example SR 6 in Apulia although subsequently downgraded to provincial) or former provincial regional roads such as SR 89, ex SP 62, in Veneto.

The regional roads can be technically classified as strade extraurbane principali (type B road; "main extra-urban roads") or as strade extraurbane secondarie (type C road; "secondary extra-urban roads"). If they cross inhabited centers with a population greater than 9,999 inhabitants, they are roads under municipal jurisdiction and therefore urban (type D and E). If they pass through centers or inhabited areas with a population of less than 9,999 inhabitants, they are urban (type D and E), but the responsibility remains with the manager.

In addition to the roads identified by the acronym SR, there are roads managed by the region but identified by the acronym SP (for example, many SPs in the province of Belluno are managed by the Veneto Strade company with a 30% stake in the region of the same name).

=== Provincial roads ===
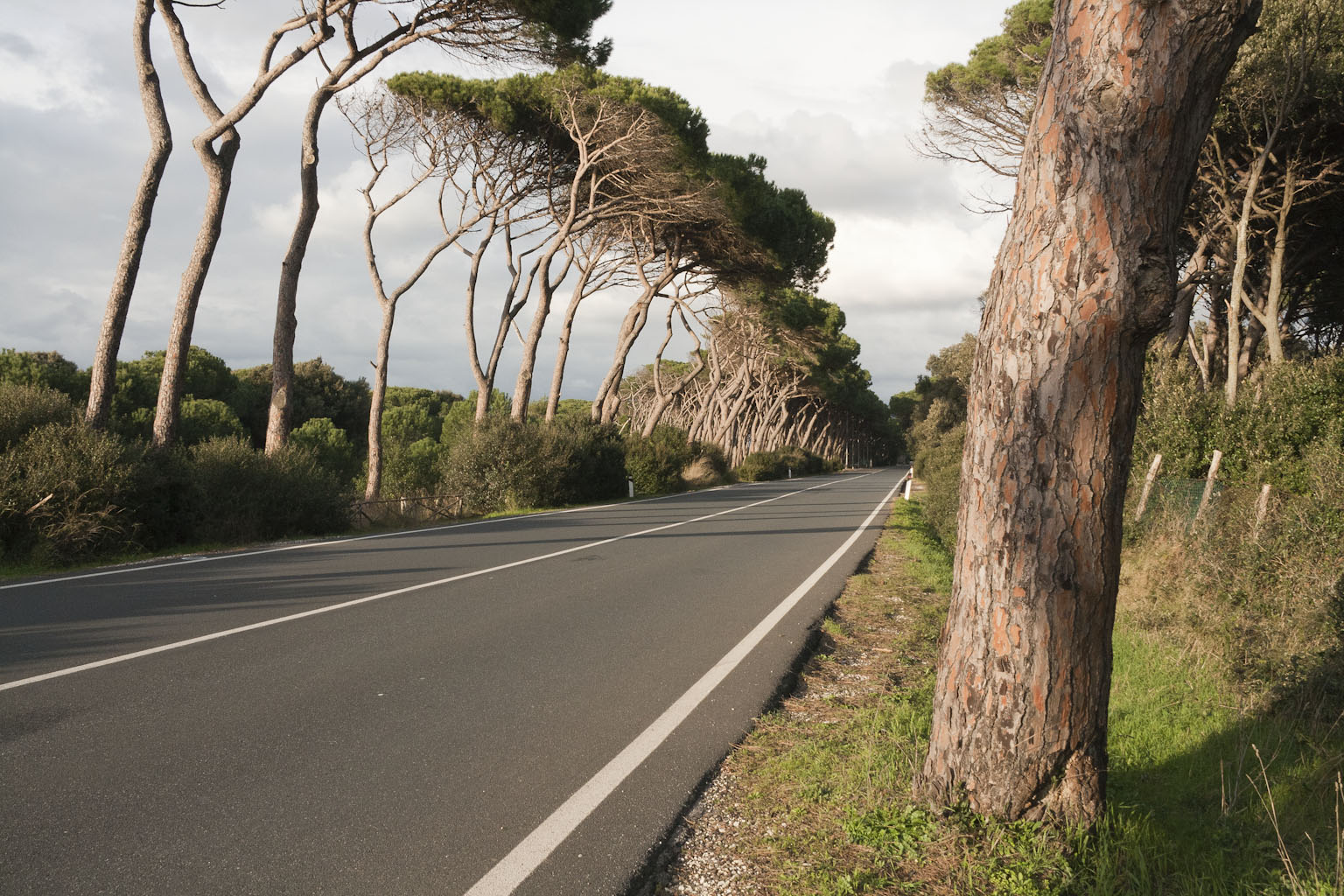
Provincial road number 23 (SP 23) in the province of Livorno (Tuscany region)

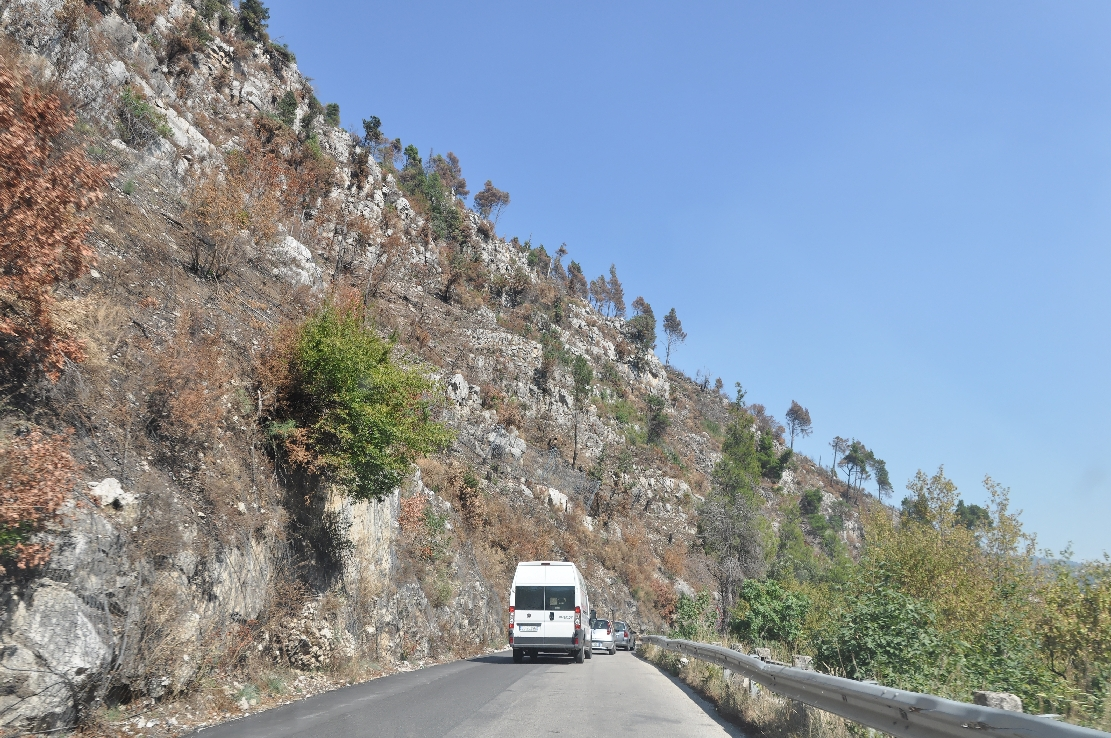
Provincial road number 76 (SP 76) in the province of Benevento (Campania region)

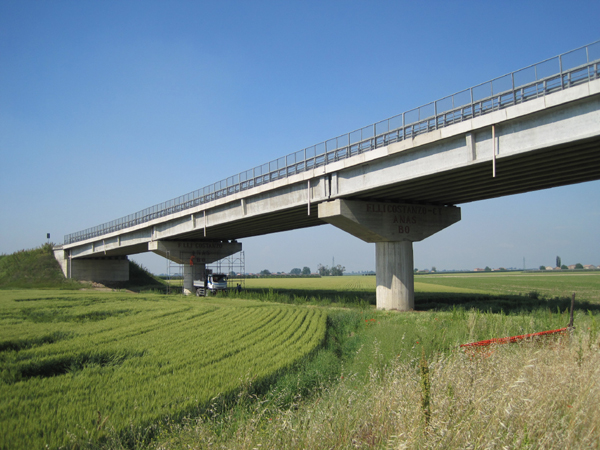
Provincial road number 468 (SP 468) in the province of Modena (Emilia-Romagna region)

A Strada Provinciale (Italian for "provincial road"; pl. "strade provinciali"), abbreviated SP, is an Italian road that is maintained by provinces or metropolitan cities. In Veneto from 2002, state highways downgraded as provincial roads are maintained by the regional company Veneto Strade. A provincial road is less important than a regional road, but more important than municipal roads.

Before the entry into force of the new Italian traffic code (legislative decree n° 285 of 30 April 1992) the provincial classification of a road had to take place by decree of the Minister of Public Works; over the years, this has made the same procedures too centralized and therefore slower and more difficult, until the new Italian traffic code assigned the competence on classification to the regions (Veneto, however, has further devolved the competences of classification and declassification to the provinces themselves).

According to a more extensive description provided by the law No. 126 12 February 1958, provincial roads were roads which:

a) connect to the provincial capital the capitals of the individual municipalities of the respective province or to several capitals of municipalities between them;

b) connect to the state and provincial network the capitals of municipalities that are particularly important in terms of population or because they are home to notable industries or because they are centers of intense commercial activity or because they are climatic or tourist centers of notable importance;

c) connect provincial or municipal capitals to the nearest airports, railway stations, sea, lake or river ports;

d) constitute direct and important connections between provincial roads, or are recognized as necessary for the valorisation of important agricultural activities

— Law n°126 of 12 February 1958, article 4

which has become, with the new Italian traffic code:

The roads are provincial when they connect to the provincial capital the capitals of the individual municipalities of the respective province or several capitals of municipalities together or when they connect the capitals of municipalities to the state or regional network, if this is particularly relevant for industrial reasons, commercial, agricultural, tourist and climatic.

— Italian traffic code

=== Municipal roads ===
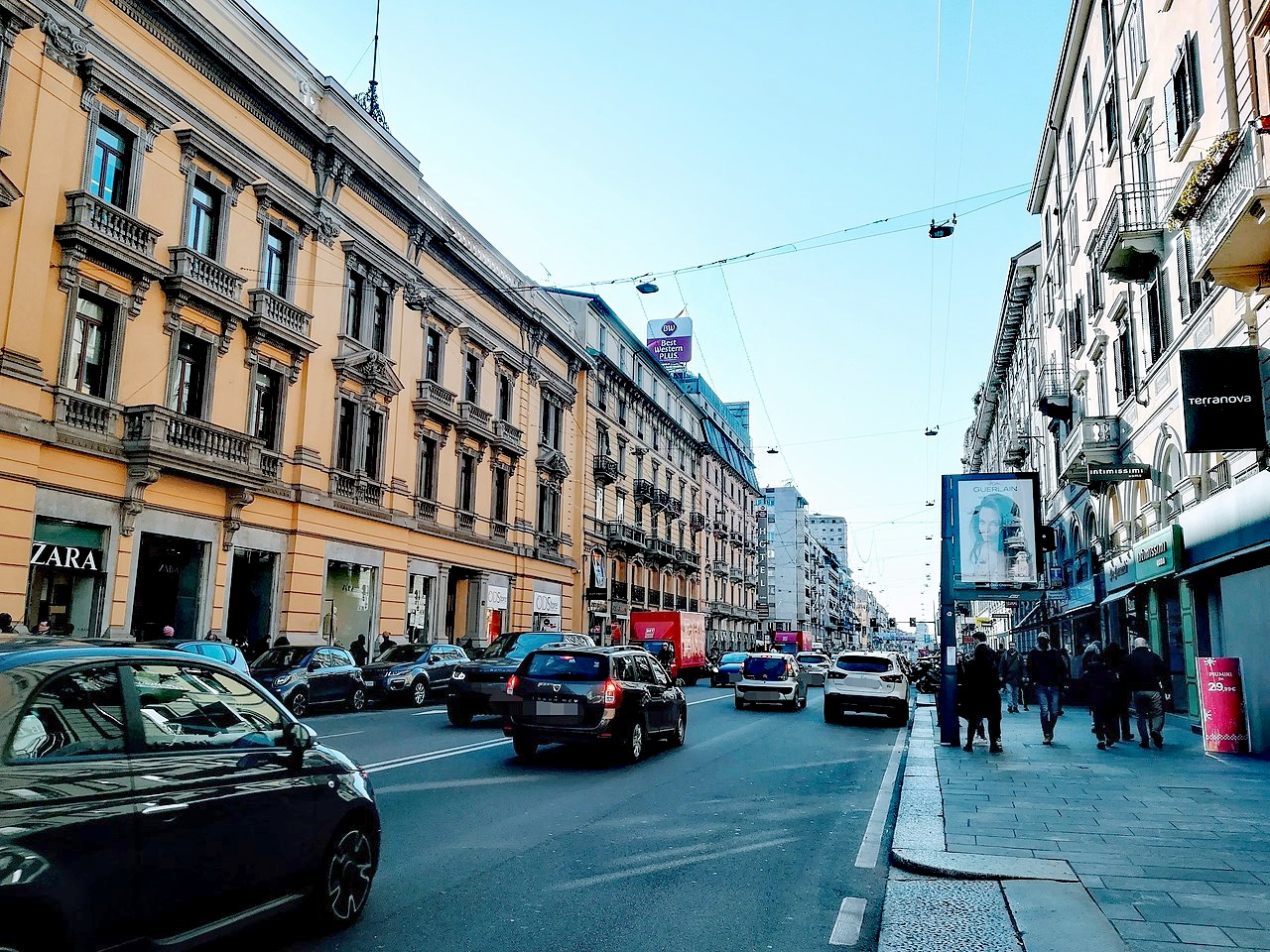
Corso Buenos Aires in Milan, an urban municipal road

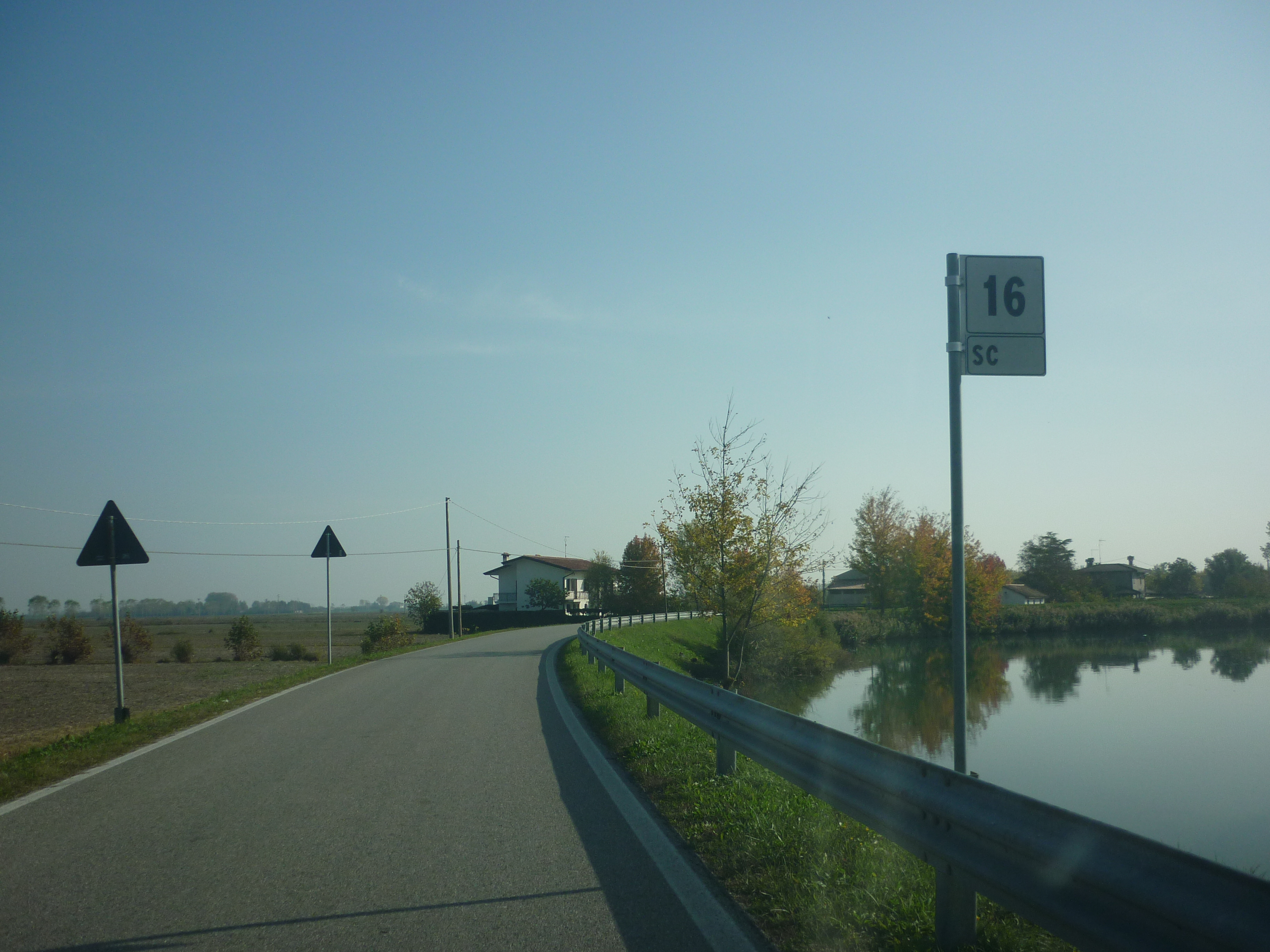
Extra-urban municipal road in Veneto region marked with a number and with the abbreviation SC. Very rarely extra-urban municipal roads are marked with a number and with the abbreviation SC.

A Strada Comunale (Italian for "municipal road"; pl. "strade comunali"), abbreviated SC, is an Italian road that is maintained by comune, hence the name. They can be roads owned by comune (inside population centers) or roads managed by the comune (outside population centers). The category of strade comunali includes extra-urban roads considered to be of municipal importance, all urban roads as well as the urban sections of state, regional or provincial roads, which pass through centers with 10,000 or more inhabitants. The urban sections of state, regional or provincial roads that pass through towns with fewer than 10,000 inhabitants are not municipal.

Strade comunali within inhabited centers can be classified from a construction-technical point of view either as urban roads (type D and E) or as local roads (type F). Extra-urban municipal roads (outside inhabited centers) can be technically classified as strade extraurbane principali (type B; "main extra-urban roads"), strade extraurbane secondarie (type C; "secondary extra-urban roads"), strade urbane di scorrimento (type D; "urban traffic roads") or strada locale (type F; local roads).

Assuming that the urban roads within the inhabited centers are all owned by the municipality (with the exception of the internal sections of state, regional or provincial roads that pass through inhabited centers with a population not exceeding 10,000 inhabitants), it is understood that the extra-urban roads outside the inhabited centers are to be considered municipal when:

- they connect the capital of the municipality with its hamlets or join the hamlets together;
- they connect the capital of the municipality with the railway, tram or car station, with an airport or sea, lake or river port, with interports or intermodal exchange nodes or with the localities that are home to essential services of interest to the municipal community;
- they belong to state property (see State Archive of State Property) or if acquired with an act of expropriation of private land (see City Council Resolution).

The useful elements to assume that a road is municipal property are: its location within the inhabited centres, its name in the toponymy and consequently in the cadastral maps, its house numbering, presence of lighting and water collection, be constantly maintained by the municipal body.

== European classification ==
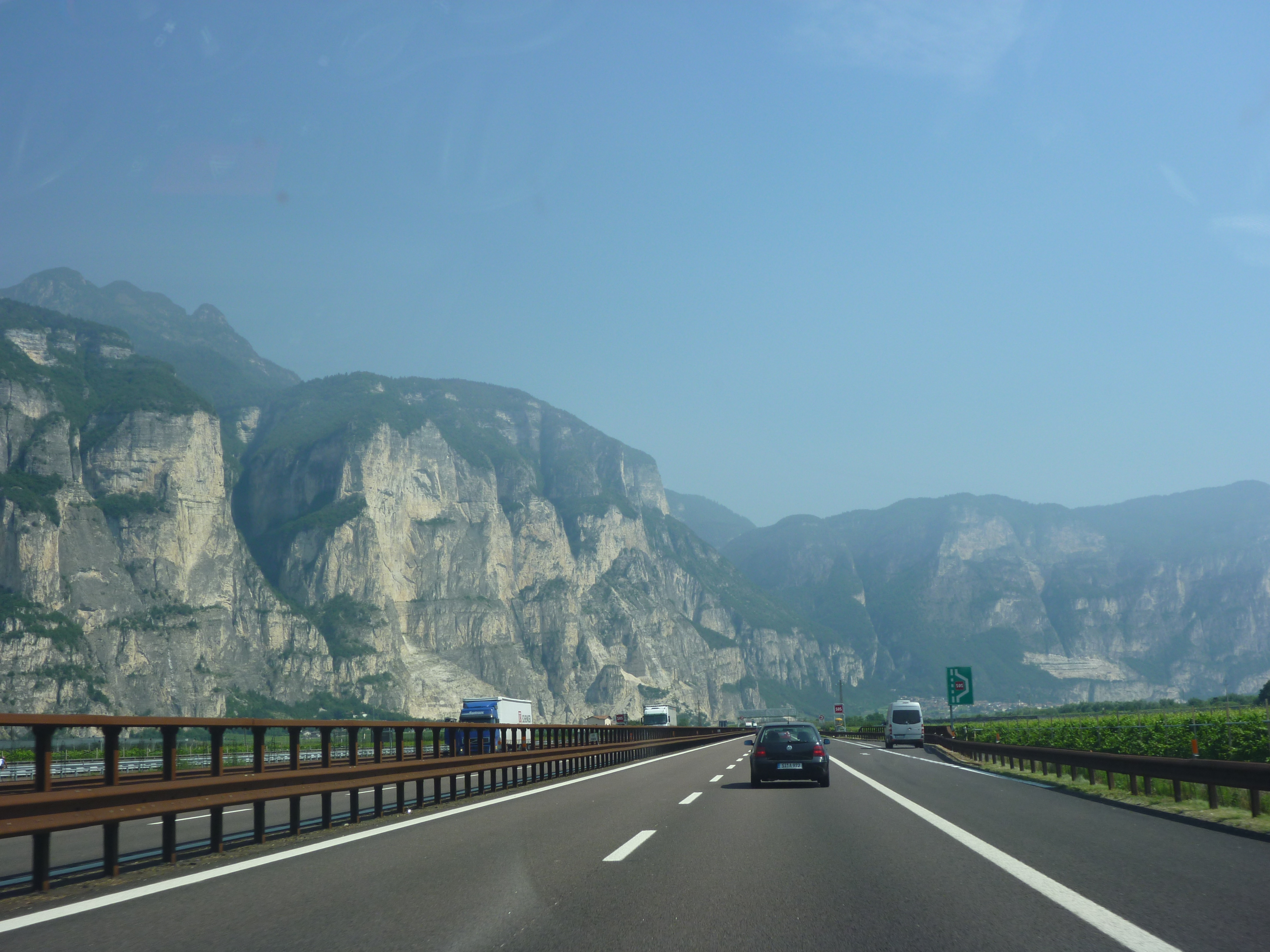
Autostrada A22 (part of the European route E45)

Some Italian roads, if they are part of the International E-road network, are also identified by another alphanumeric abbreviation. This acronym is made up of the letter "E" and one or two digits. The symbol used is a rectangle with a green background with the acronym in white. This classification, which evaluates the importance (being neither a technical nor an administrative classification) of the road in the European Union, complements the usual Italian ones. European road acronyms are mostly absent or reported inorganically on signs in Italy. The European classification is foreseen by the Italian traffic code which defines it as additional.

== Other classifications ==
These classifications are not provided for by the Italian traffic code.

=== Motorway tunnels ===
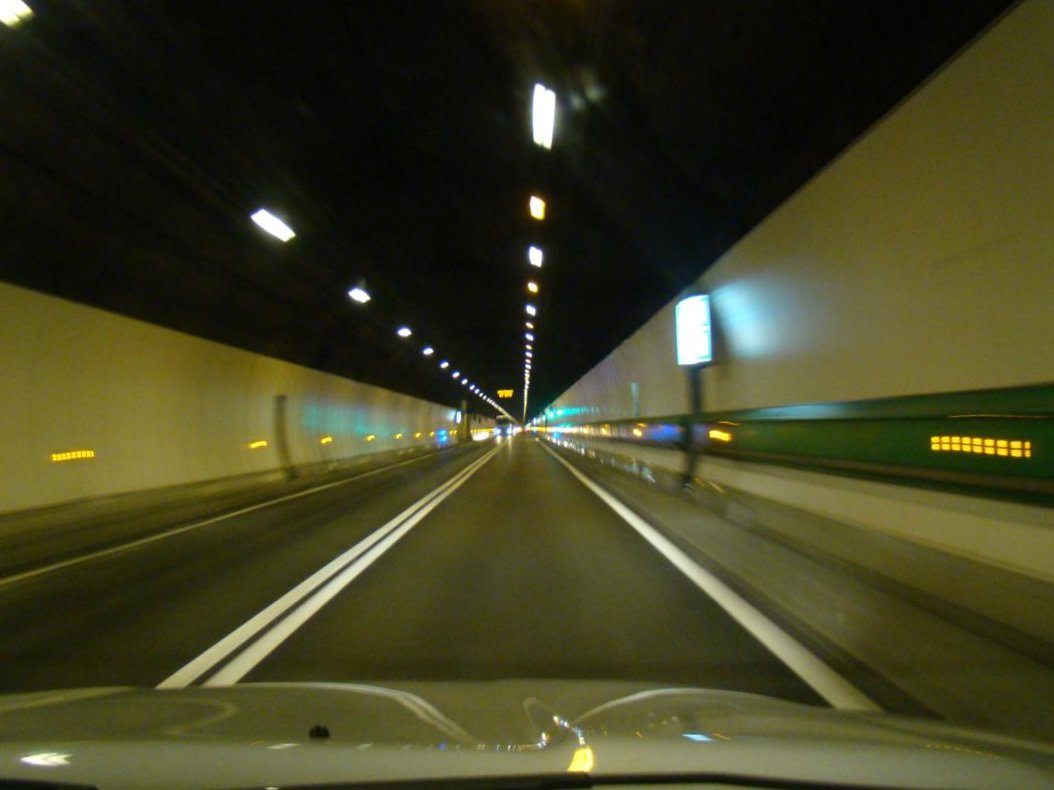
Mont-Blanc Tunnel

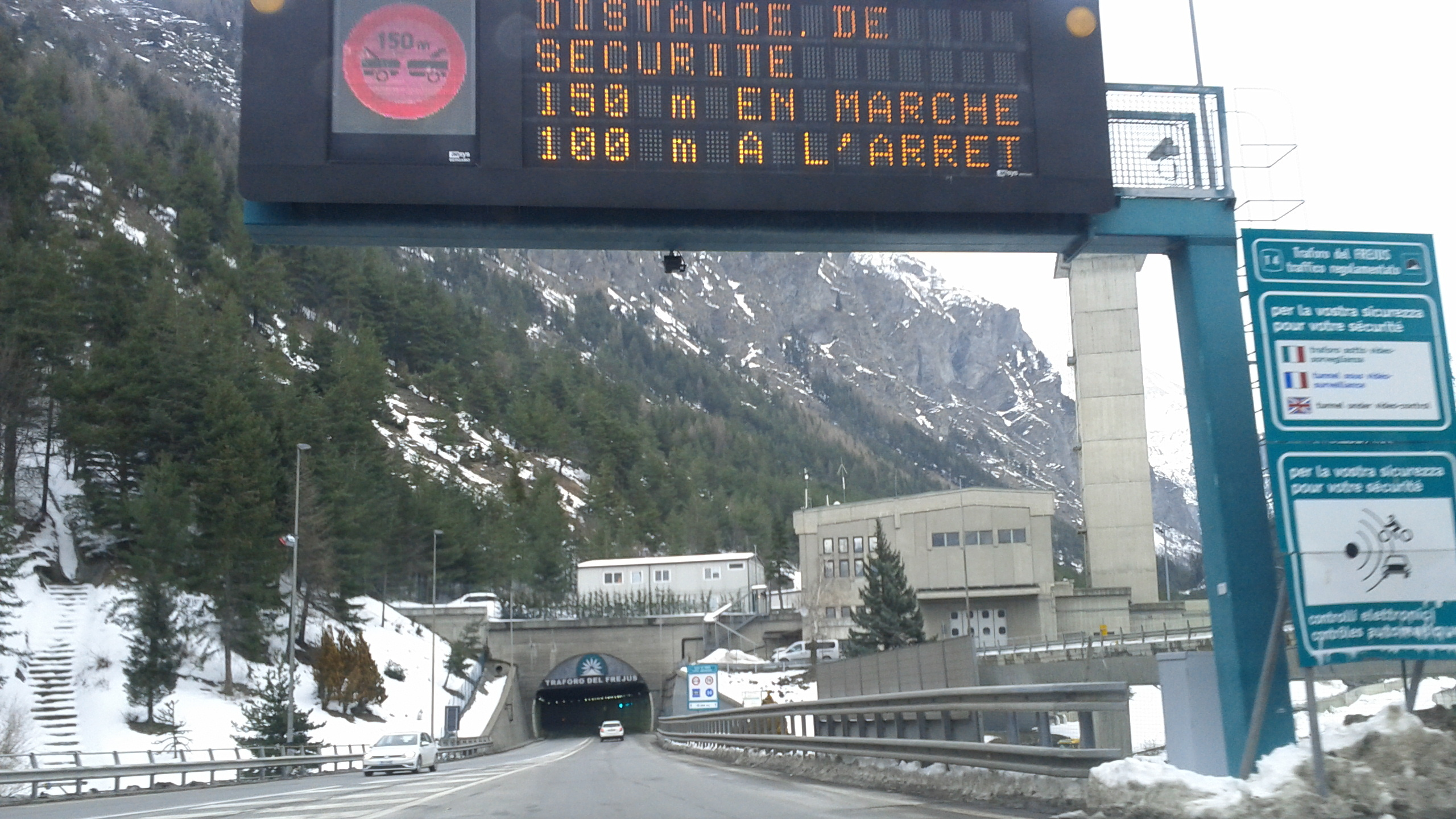
Entrance to the Frejus Road Tunnel from the Italian side

Important Alpine motorway tunnels (Italian: trafori; sing. traforo) are identified by the capital letter "T" followed by a single digit number.

Currently there are only three T-classified tunnels: Mont Blanc Tunnel (T1), Great St Bernard Tunnel (T2) and Frejus Road Tunnel (T4). Tunnels that cross the border between Italy and France (T1, T4) or Switzerland (T2), are treated as motorways (green signage, access control, and so on), although they are not proper motorways.

The code T3 was once assigned to the Bargagli-Ferriere Tunnel in Ligurian Apennines, opened in 1971. The T3 tunnel connected Bargagli with Ferriere, in the province of Genoa, for a length of 4.250 kilometres (2.641 mi). It was initially classified as a motorway, but following the decree of 22 July 1989, responsibilities were transferred to Anas, which included the route in the itinerary of the state road 225 of Val Fontanabuona. However, the road maintains all the motorway rules regarding access.

=== Motorway connections ===
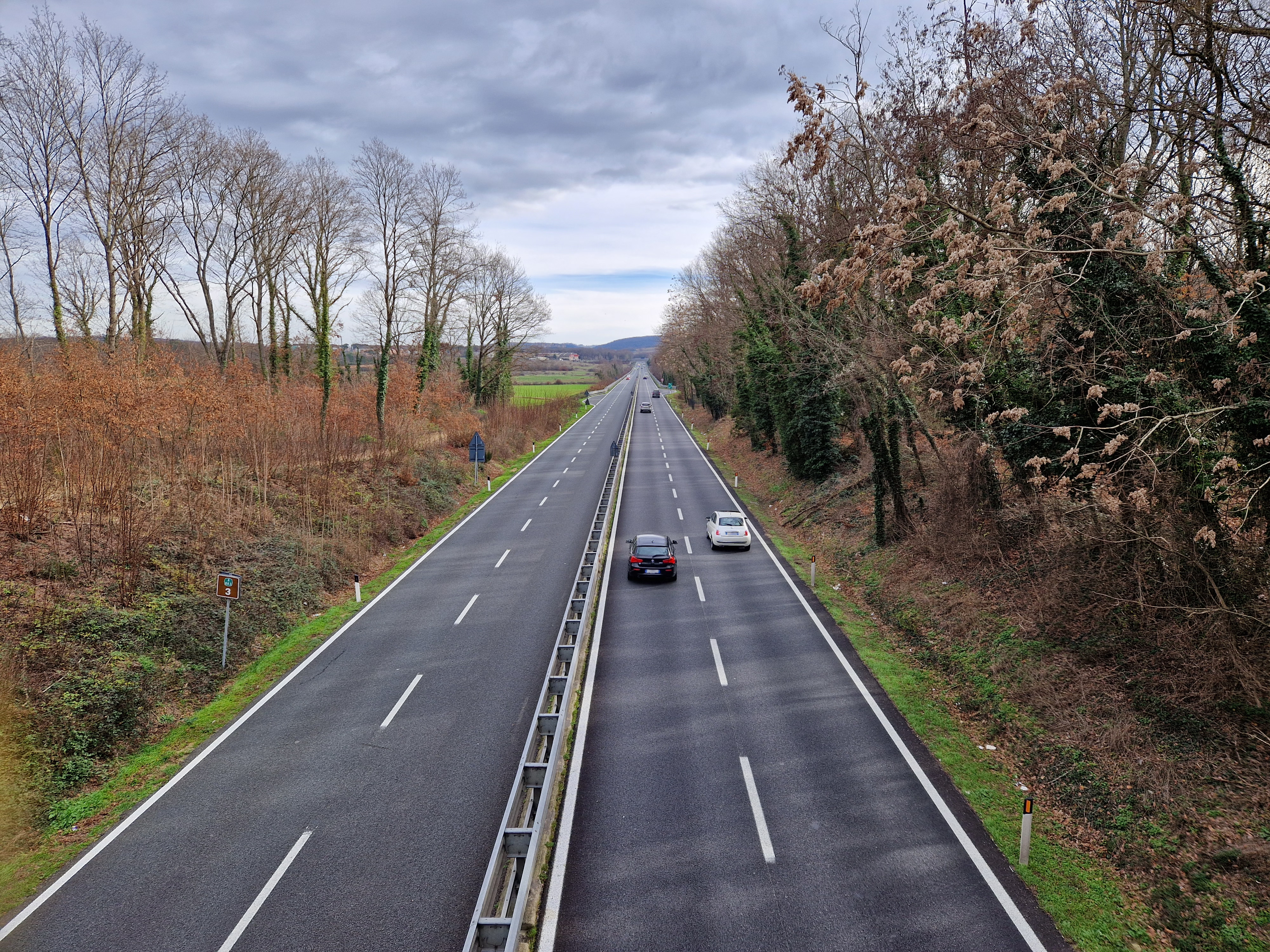
Raccordo autostradale RA3

The acronym RA stands for Raccordo autostradale (translated as "motorway connection"), a relatively short spur route that connects a motorway to a nearby city or tourist resort not directly served by the motorway. These spurs are owned and managed by Anas. Some spurs are toll-free motorways (type-A), but most are type-B or type-C roads. All RA have separate carriageways with two lanes in each direction. Generally, they do not have an emergency lane.

In 1984, by ministerial decree of 20 July 1983, some motorway junctions, already open, forming part of the Italian trunk roads, were defined and classified as such. The legislative decree of 29 October 1999, n. 461, reorganized the road sections classified as motorway junctions, identifying 17 of them. In the following years, the RA7 was classified, in parallel with the name already assumed, in Autostrada A53, maintaining both names in official documents. The RA17, however, in 2013, following modernization works, was completely reclassified as a motorway, changing its name to Autostrada A34. By 2023, 16 Italian road sections were classified with the RA acronym.

=== Ring roads ===
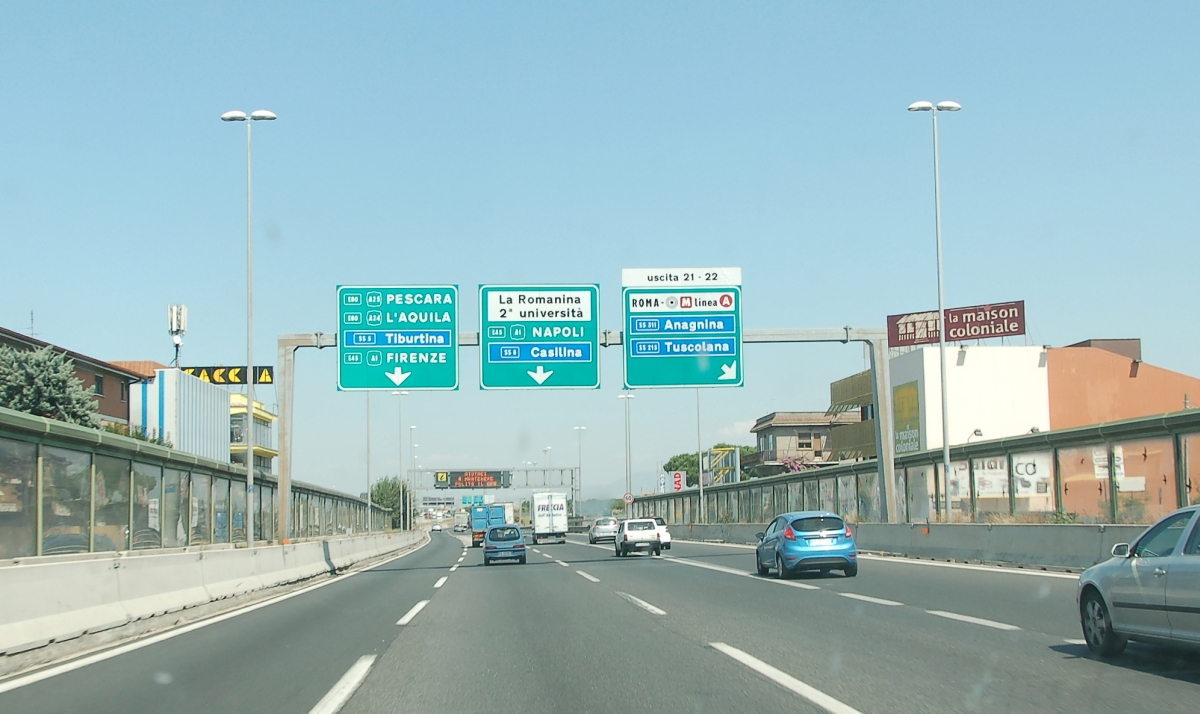
Grande Raccordo Anulare, the ring road of Rome

In Italy the informal classification of ring roads (in Italian tangenziale) refer to a fast road, built in particularly urbanized areas, to allow the transit of vehicles without having to come into direct contact with urban traffic.

It can be presented as a classic motorway or expressway, with two or more lanes in each direction, and in some cases an emergency lane. It may be paid, and therefore include toll booths for the collection of the toll, and can have various exits both in correspondence with the main city roads and in connection with the remaining motorway system. It can also appear as a single carriageway road, with only one lane in each direction, with or without at-grade intersections.

A ring road can be administratively classified in all sorts of ways. Any access bans on the ring road and speed limits depend on how it is classified according to current regulations. If it is a motorway, the motorway regulations apply and the signs would have a green background; for example pedestrians, bicycles, agricultural machinery, mopeds and animal-drawn vehicles, as well as motorcycles with an engine capacity of less than 150 cc, cannot pass through. The maximum permitted speed limit is 130 km/h (81 mph), unless otherwise indicated.

If it is a strada extraurbana principale ("main extra-urban road"), the provisions of main extra-urban roads apply and the signs would have a blue background, have the same restrictions on slow vehicles as for motorways, and the maximum speed limit allowed is 110 km/h (68 mph), unless otherwise indicated.

If it is a strada extraurbana secondaria ("secondary extra-urban road"), the signs would have a blue background and there are no particular transit bans, unless a specific sign is placed at the entrances of the ring road. The speed limit cannot exceed 90 km/h (56 mph).

=== Major communication road ===
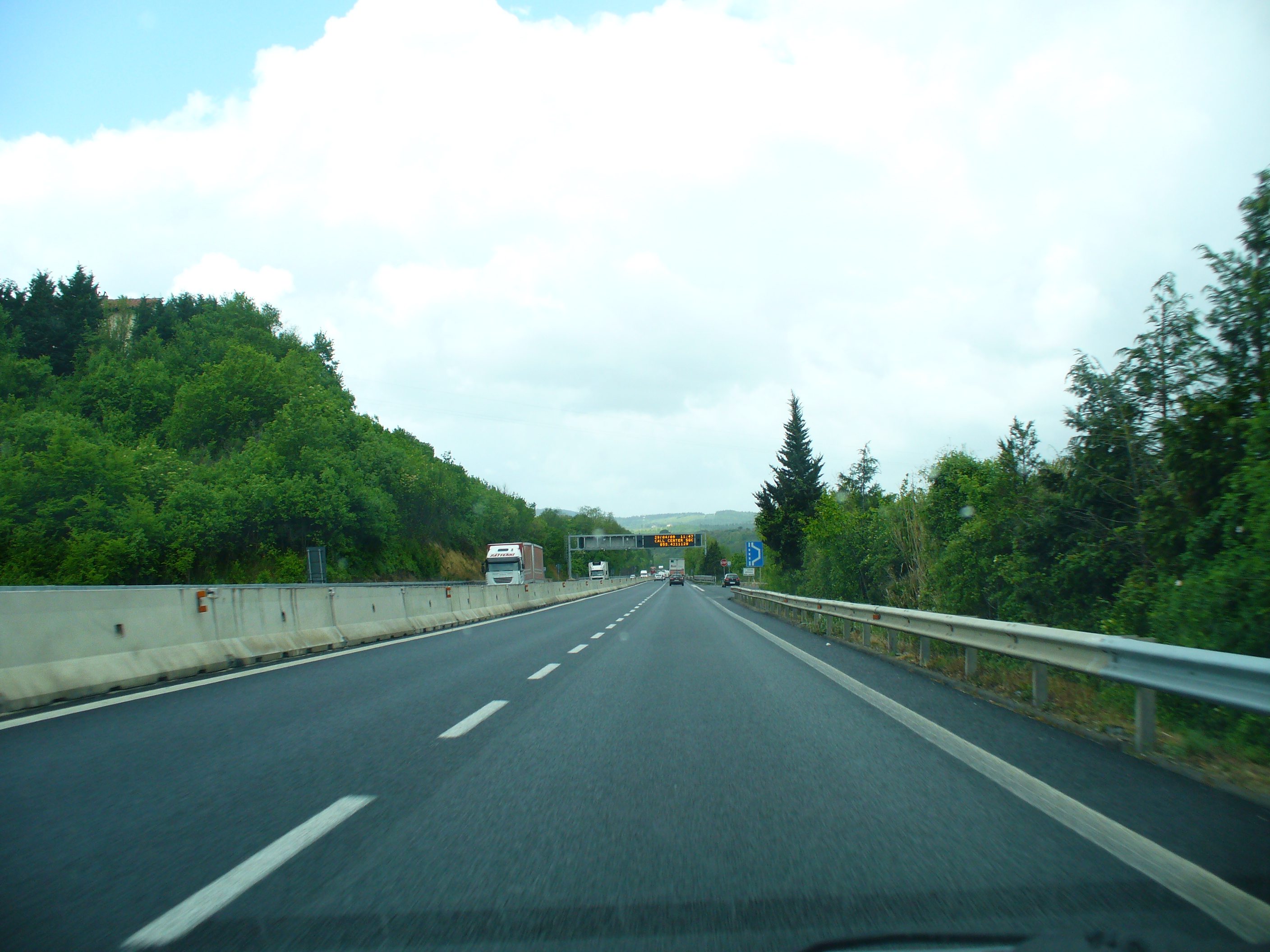
Strada di grande comunicazione Florence-Pisa-Livorno

In Italy, some roads of national importance are called strada di grande comunicazione (abbreviated to SGC; "major communication roads"), an expression coined by the Touring Club Italiano and used in its maps and publications since the 1920s.

Law no. 126 of 12 February 1958, as amended by law no. 167 of 9 April 1971, classified state roads either as major trunk roads or as ordinary state roads.

For law n. 531 of 12 August 1982 (GU no. 223 of 14/08/1982), the main roads were classified as motorways, Alpine tunnels, motorway junctions, and roads that connect the main road network with the neighboring states, roads that constitute the major routes of national traffic (including Sicily and Sardinia), roads that constitute the main inter-regional connections and roads connecting to the first category ports and the most important airports.

The acronym SGC is not used to identify other types of roads (as is the case with the acronyms A, SS, SR, SP) but is used in address documents.

=== Superstrada ===
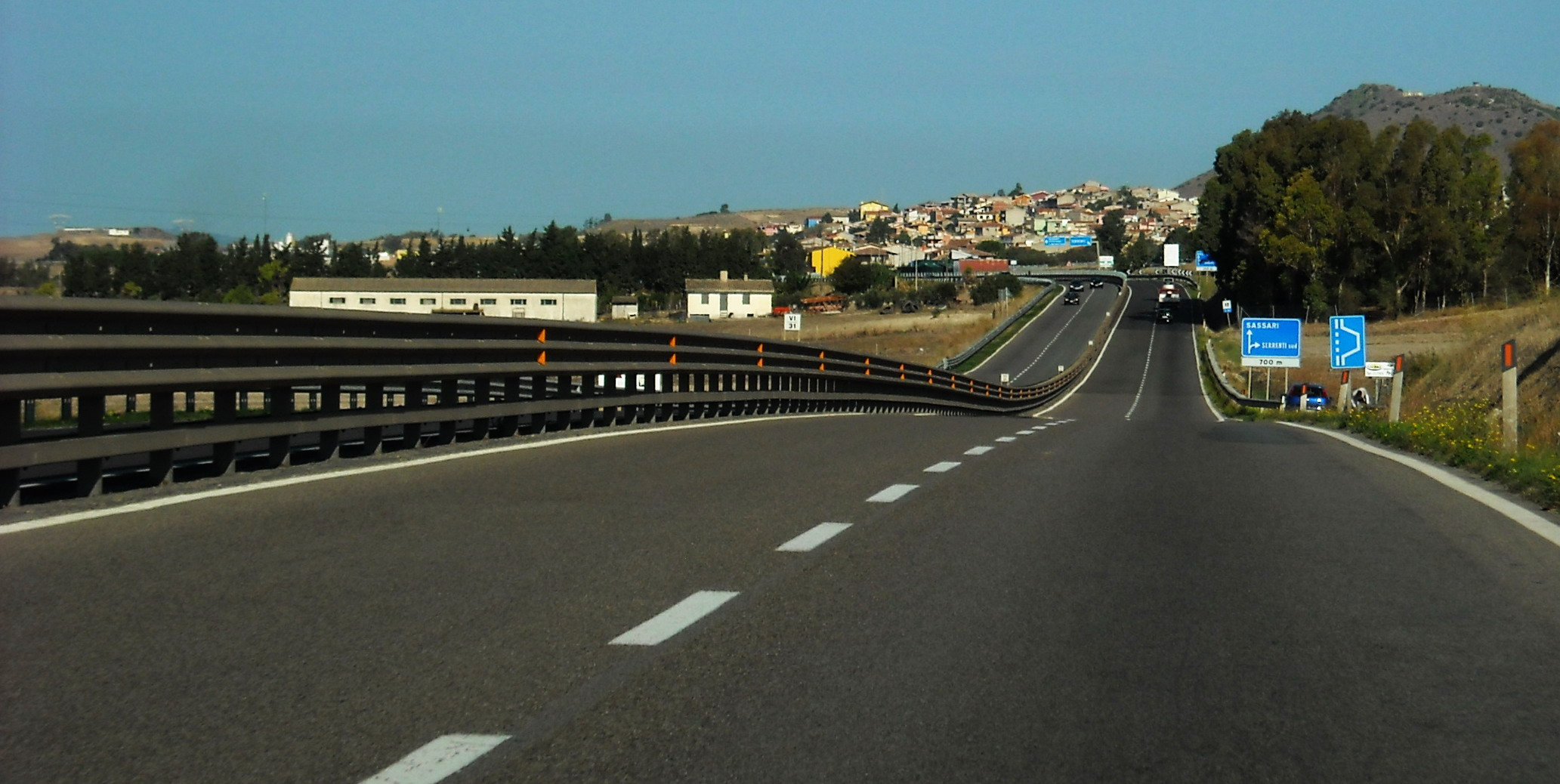
The superstrada Cagliari-Porto Torres (Strada statale 131 Carlo Felice), the main road artery of Sardinia

A superstrada ("super road") is a fast road, often with separate carriageways in each direction, reserved for the circulation of motor vehicles and without at-grade intersections and urban crossings. The colloquial classification of superstrada refers to all roads classified technically as main extra-urban roads and, in general, to secondary two-lane extra-urban roads.

== Speed limits ==

Road speed limits in Italy are used to define the maximum legal speed limit for road vehicles using public roads in Italy. The speed limit in each location is usually indicated on a nearby traffic sign. Signs show speed limits in kilometres per hour (km/h).

Road	Limit	Notes
Autostrada (type A); Motorway		There are legal provisions enabling the operators to set the limit to 150 km/h on their concessions on a voluntary basis, only if some conditions are met: 3 lanes in each direction, SICVE (also called Safety Tutor) speed camera system etc, but any speed exceeding 130km/h (and "no speed limit") has never been adopted due to safety concerns.
Autostrada (type A); Motorway		Maximum speed limit (Mandatory by law).
Autostrada (type A); Motorway		The limit is 110 km/h in case of rain or snow.
Strada extraurbana principale (type B); Main extra-urban road		
Strada extraurbana principale (type B); Main extra-urban road		The limit is 90 km/h in case of rain or snow.
Strada extraurbana secondaria (type C); Secondary extra-urban road or +		
Strada urbana di scorrimento (type D); Urban highway + or + +		
Strada urbana (type E); Urban road or +		
Zona 30		For instance in Torino.

== Signage ==
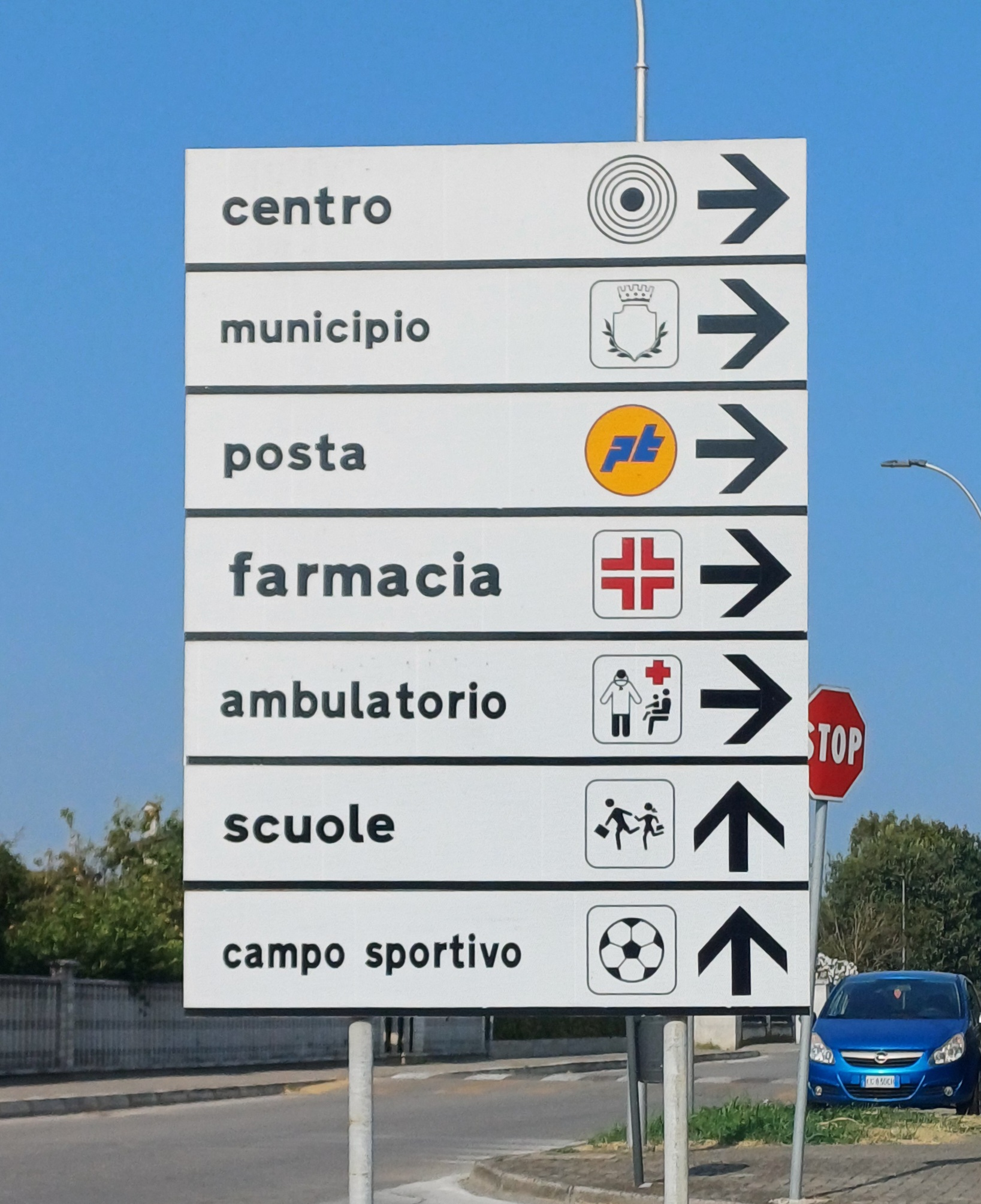
An example of a directional road sign in Italy

Road signs in Italy conform to the general pattern of those used in most other European countries, with the notable exception that the background of motorway (autostrada) signs is green and those for 'normal' roads is blue. They are regulated by the Codice della Strada (Italian traffic code) and by the Regolamento di Attuazione del Codice della Strada (Rules for the Implementation of the Italian traffic code) in conformity with the 1968 Vienna Convention on Road Signs and Signals. Italy signed the Vienna Convention on Road Signs and Signals on November 8, 1968, and ratified it on February 7, 1997.

Distances and other measurements are displayed in metric units. Warning signs are usually placed 150 metres before the area they're referring to; if they're farther or nearer, an additional sign displays the actual distance in metres. Prohibition signs and mandatory instruction signs, instead, are placed exactly at the beginning of the area of validity.

== Toll roads ==
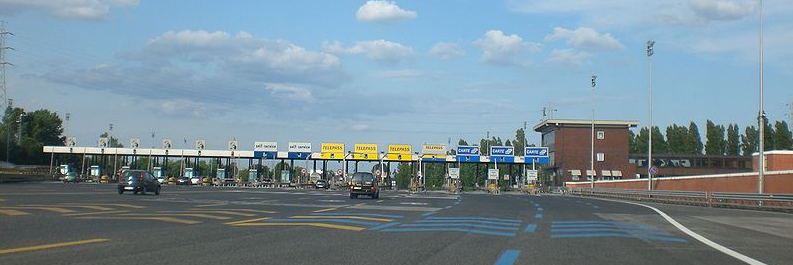
Toll plaza along the Autostrada A57

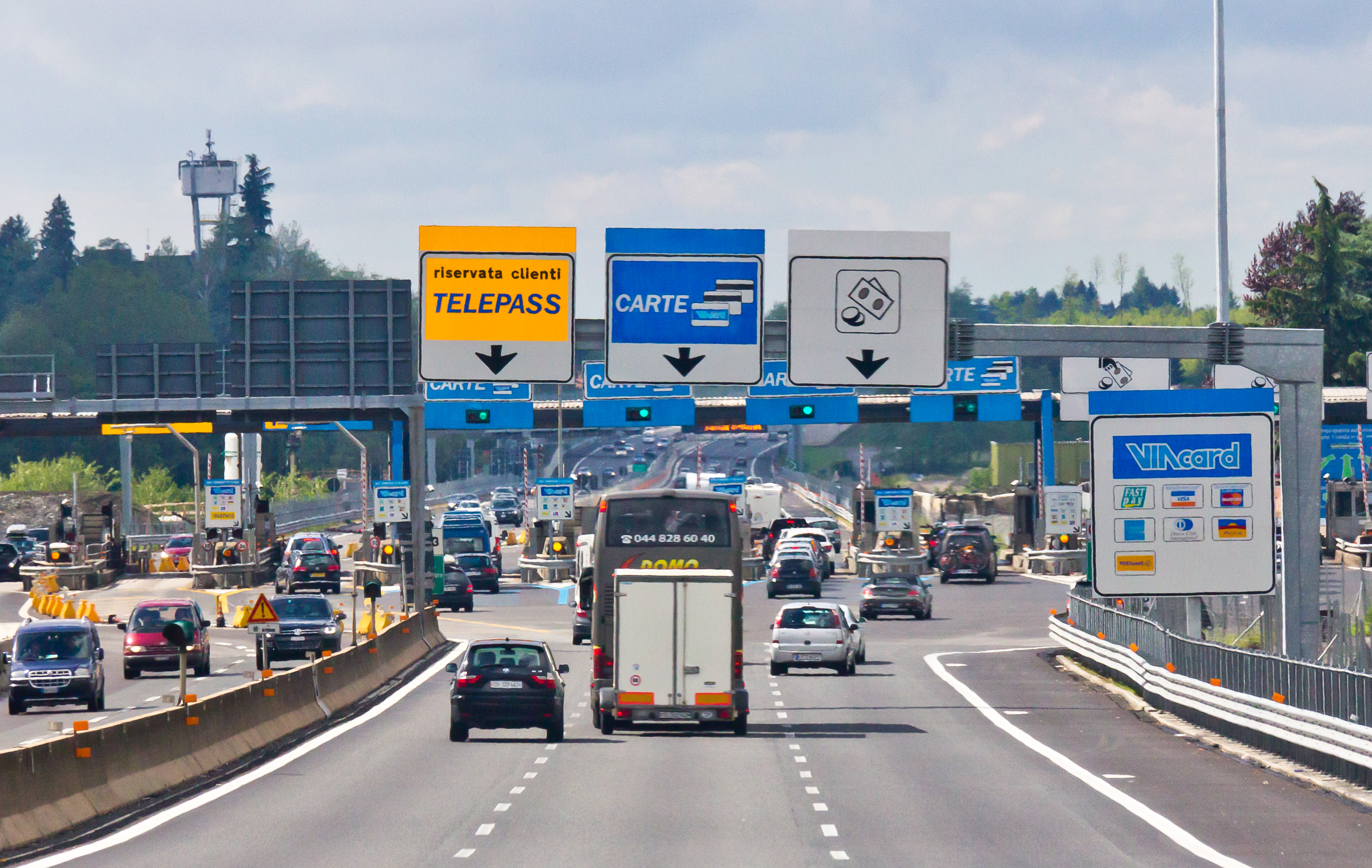
Toll station along the Autostrada A9

In Italy the only toll roads are the autostrade (Italian for motorways). Major exceptions are the beltways around some larger cities (tangenziali) which are not part of a thoroughfare motorway, and the section of the A3 motorway between Salerno and Reggio di Calabria which is operated by the government-owned ANAS. Both are toll free.

On Italian motorways, the toll applies to almost all motorways not managed by Anas. The collection of motorway tolls, from a tariff point of view, is managed mainly in two ways: either through the "closed motorway system" (km travelled) or through the "open motorway system" (flat-rate toll).

Given the multiplicity of operators, the toll is only requested when exiting the motorway and not when the motorway operator changes. This system was made possible following article 14 of law 531 of 12 August 1982.

From a technical point of view, however, the mixed barrier/free-flow system is active where, at the entrance and exit from the motorways, there are lanes dedicated to the collection of a ticket (on entry) and the delivery of the ticket with simultaneous payment (on exit) and other lanes where, during transit without the need to stop, an electronic toll system present in the vehicles records the data and debits the toll, generally into the bank account previously communicated by the customer, to the manager of his device. In Italy, this occurs through the Autostrade per l'Italia interchange system.

The Autostrada A36, Autostrada A59 and Autostrada A60 are exclusively free-flow. On these motorways, those who do not have the electronic toll device on board must proceed with the payment by subsequently communicating the data to the motorway manager (by telephone, online or by going to the offices dedicated to payment).

The closed motorway system is applied to most Italian motorways. It requires the driver of the vehicle to collect a special ticket at the entrance to the motorway and pay the amount due upon exit. If equipped with an electronic toll system the two procedures are completely automatic and the driver on the detection lanes located at the entrances and exits from the motorways subject to toll payment must only proceed at a maximum speed of 30 kilometres per hour (20 mph) without the need to stop. The amount is directly proportional to the distance travelled by the vehicle, the coefficient of its class and a variable coefficient from motorway to motorway, called the kilometre rate.

Unlike the closed motorway system, in the open system, the road user does not pay based on the distance travelled. Motorway barriers are arranged along the route (however not at every junction), at which the user pays a fixed sum, depending only on the class of the vehicle. The user can therefore travel along sections of the motorway without paying any toll as the barriers may not be present on the section travelled.

== Nomenclature ==
A stands for autostrada ("motorway"), SS for strada statale ("state highway"), SR for strada regionale ("regional road"), SP for strada provinciale ("provincial road") and SC for strada comunale ("municipal road").

=== Numbering ===
==== Motorways ====
Road marker for motorways in Italy

Motorways of Italy, the so-called autostrade, follow a single numbering, even if managed by different concessionaire companies: they are all marked with the letter "A" ("RA" in the case of motorway junctions, with the exception of the Bereguardo-Pavia junction numbered on the signs as Autostrada A53, and "T" for the international Alpine tunnels) followed by a number. Therefore, a motorway with the same numbering can be managed by different concessionaire companies (for example the Autostrada A23 is managed for a stretch by Società Autostrade Alto Adriatico and for the remaining stretch by Autostrade per l'Italia). In road signs the alphanumeric acronym is enclosed (not in the case of the 16 junctions) in a green octagon with a white acronym. The numbers of motorways and tunnels are assigned with a circular from the Minister of Infrastructure and Transport to be published in the Gazzetta Ufficiale.

==== State highways ====
Road marker for state highways in Italy

Strade statali are identified by a number and a name. In road signs and maps the number is preceded by the acronym SS, an acronym for strada statale ("state road"). The nomenclature of the state highways managed by ANAS generally follows the SS n scheme, where n is a number ranging from 1 (Aurelia) up to 700 (of the Royal Palace of Caserta) depending on the date of establishment of the state highway. Newly built ANAS roads, not yet classified, are identified by the acronym NSA, an acronym for nuova strada ANAS ("new ANAS road"). In road signs the alphanumeric acronym is enclosed in a blue rectangle with a white acronym.

==== Regional, provincial and municipal roads ====
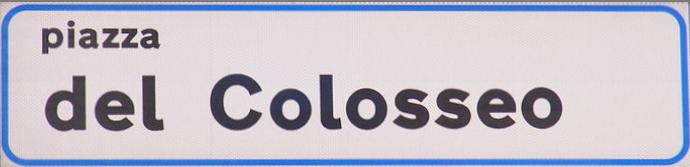
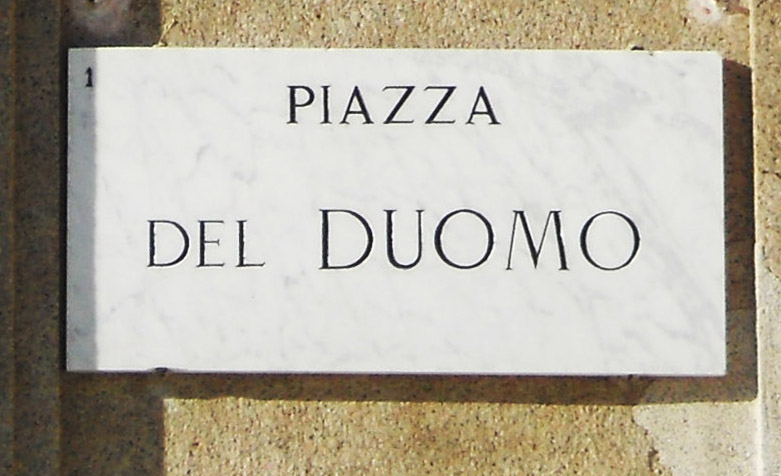
Road signs for a municipal road within an inhabited center

Strade regionali are identified by a number. In road signs and maps the number is preceded by the acronym SR, an acronym for strada regionale ("regional road"). In road signs the alphanumeric acronym is enclosed in a blue rectangle with a white acronym.

Strade provinciali are identified by a number. In road signs and maps the number is preceded by the acronym SP, an acronym for strada provinciale ("provincial road"). In road signs the alphanumeric acronym is enclosed in a blue rectangle with a white acronym.

The strade comunali within the inhabited centers are named as via, viale, corso, piazza, piazzetta, etc. followed by a name (for example via Adige). The names of municipal roads within inhabited centers are shown on rectangles, standardized by the Italian traffic code, with a white background (except for local specificities, such as the Venetian nizioleti).

Extra-urban strade comunali may be identified by a number. In road signs and maps the number is preceded by the acronym SC, an acronym for strada comunale ("municipal road"). In road signs the alphanumeric acronym is enclosed in a white rectangle with a black acronym. Very rarely extra-urban strade comunali are marked with a number and with the abbreviation SC.

Road marker for regional roads in Italy

Road marker for provincial roads in Italy

Road marker for extra-urban municipal roads in Italy

==== Major communication roads ====
Major communication roads are identified by the acronym SGC, an acronym for strada di grande comunicazione. In road signs the acronym is enclosed in a blue rectangle with a white acronym.

Road marker for major communication roads

==== New road ANAS ====
New roads ANAS are identified by a number. In road signs and maps the number is preceded by the acronym NSA, an acronym for nuove strade ANAS. In road signs the alphanumeric acronym is enclosed in a blue rectangle with a white acronym.

Road marker for new roads ANAS

=== Location markers ===
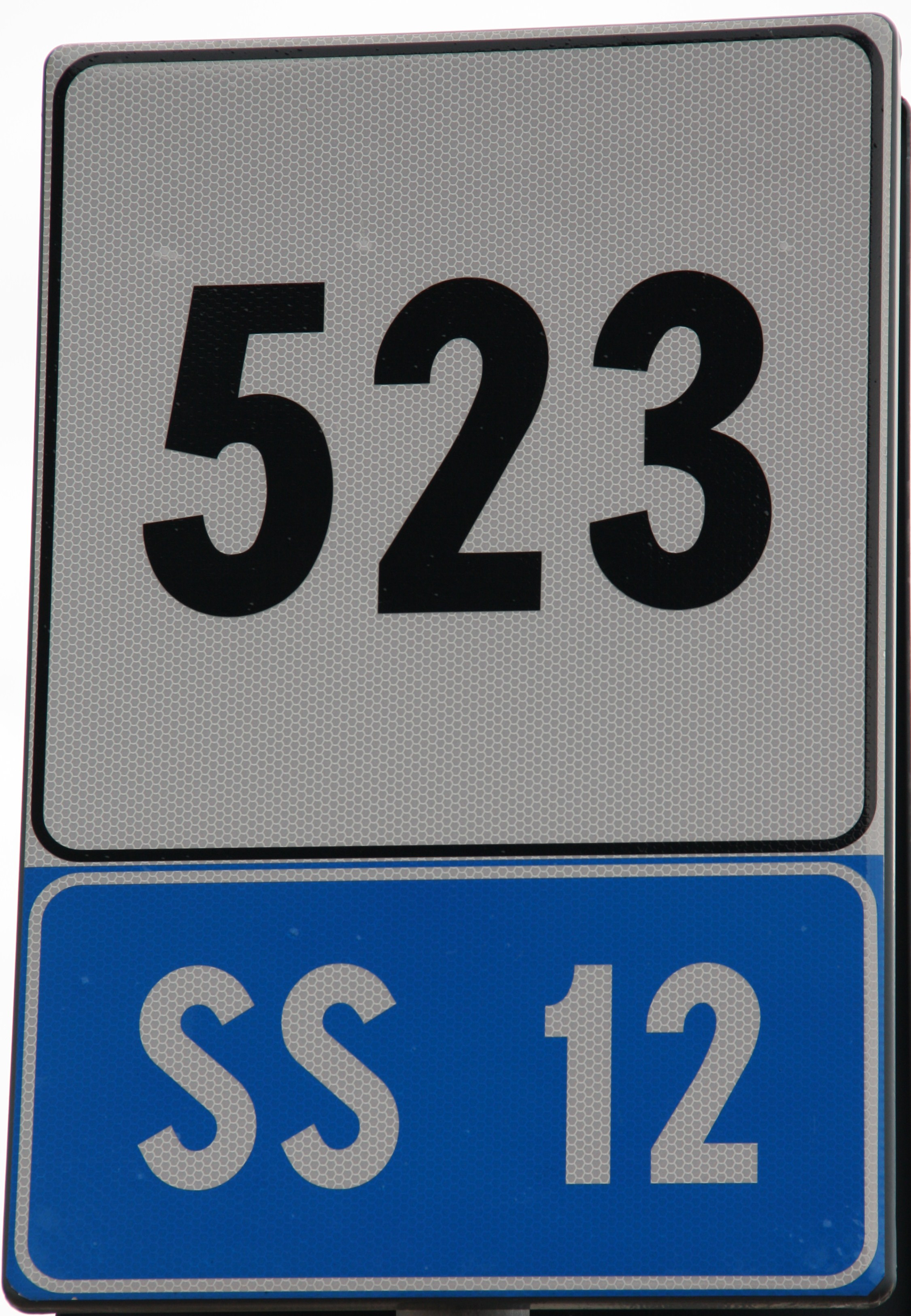
Highway location marker on the state highway number 12 indicating kilometers only, located at kilometer 523 of the road

Highway location marker which also indicates hectometres, located at kilometer 24.8 of the road, also written 24+800

The highway location markers in Italy are part of the category of distance signs, subcategory of indication signs, and are of two types, those that indicate the distance in kilometers and those that indicate the distance in hectometers (100-metre intervals). In Italy, until before 1959, the function of mileage signals was performed by milestones. In the Consolidated Law Regulation of 1959, figure 103b mentions the use of the motorway confirmation sign, consisting of a white box on the left with the distance from the point of origin of the road and a blue rectangle with white characters in which the name of the next exit is shown with the relative distance in kilometers. In the circular of the Ministry of Public Works n. 9540/1969 "Motorway signs", signs with a similar function have been adopted to be installed on the traffic island.

Highway location marker on a motorway indicating kilometers only. On the left side the progressive distance from the location of origin of the motorway is indicated (i.e. that we are at kilometer 24 from the starting point of the motorway), on the right side it indicates the distance of the exit for the indicated location (i.e. that there are 4 km or 2 1/2 miles to get to the exit for Piacenza).

In Italy the highway location marker is a square white sign with the current kilometer (of hectometer) of the road written on it. This sign is accompanied by the sign that identifies the road if it indicates the kilometers (or hectometers) of a state, regional, provincial or extra-urban municipal road. If the sign indicates kilometers of a motorway the sign is accompanied by a green sign (positioned to the right or below the main sign) indicating the next exit with the distance remaining if the kilometer ends in 1, 3, 4, 6, 7 or 9, the next service area with the remaining distance if the kilometer ends with 2, 5 and 8 or the highway with the remaining distance if the kilometer ends with 0.

To mark the distance from the starting point of a road, progressive hectometric signs are also used. These signs are placed every 100 m (110 yd) and carry a two-line indication, such as IX/17. The sign indicates in the lower part the kilometer of the last kilometer progressivity sign (if you travel the road from the starting point) or of the next one (if you travel the road from the end point) and indicates in the upper part the hectometers in Roman numerals the distance to the last sign (if you drive the road from the starting point) or the remaining distance to the next sign (if you drive the road from the ending point). These signs are positioned on all types of extra-urban roads whose length is such as to make their use appropriate.

== See also ==
- Transport in Italy

=== Italian roads ===
- Autostrade of Italy
- State highways (Italy)
- Regional road (Italy)
- Provincial road (Italy)
- Municipal road (Italy)
