= Road transport =

Collective term for all forms of transport which takes place on roads

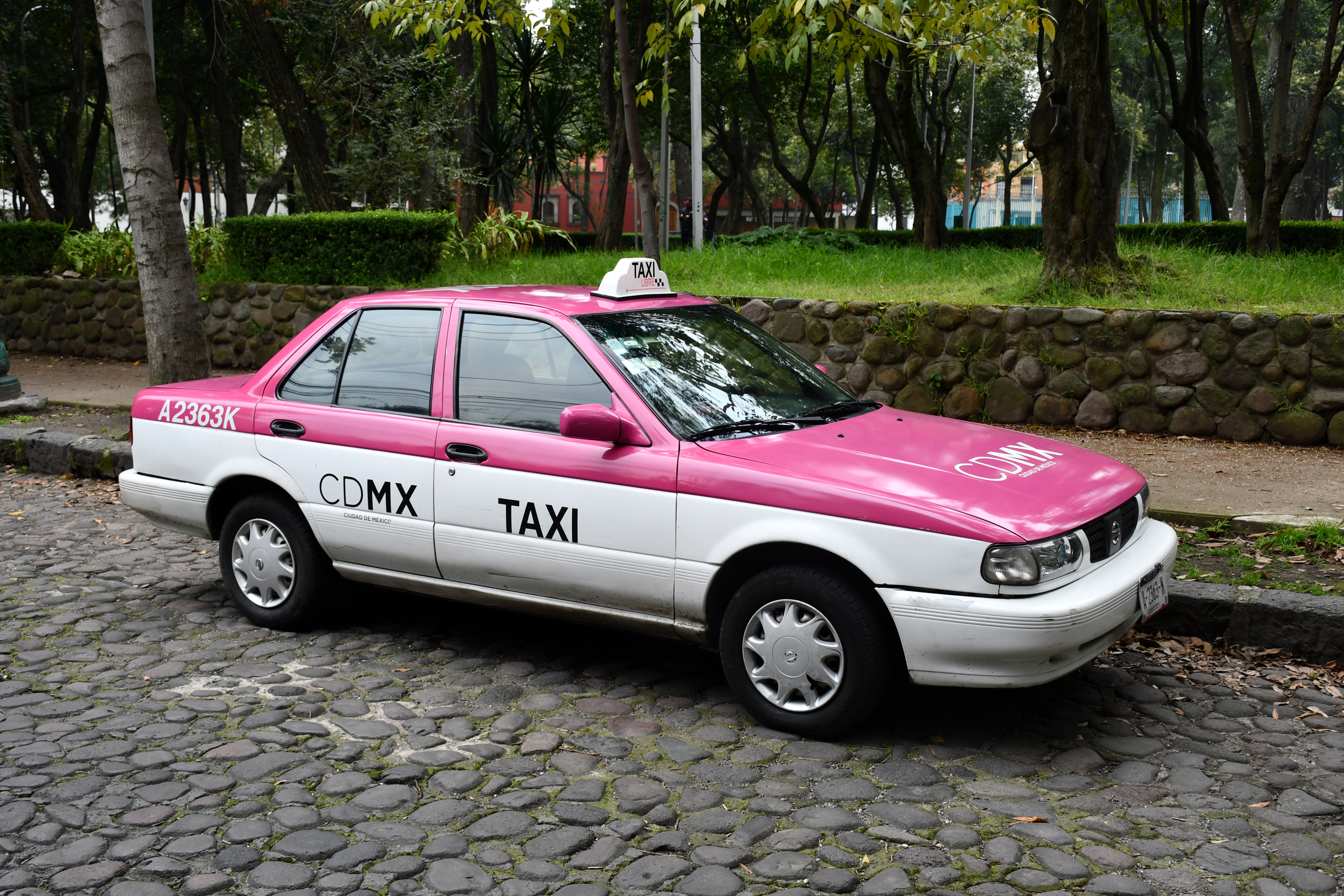
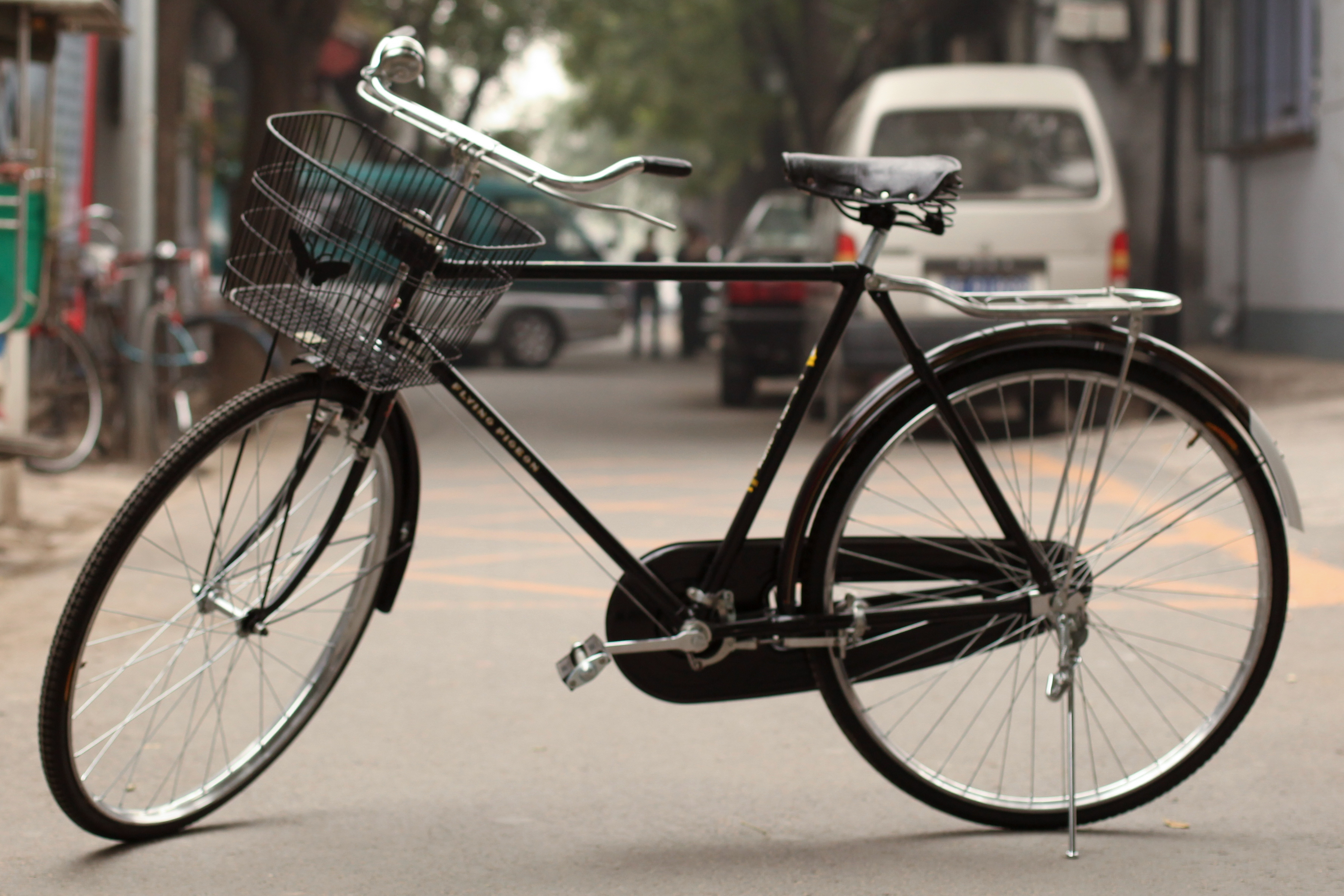
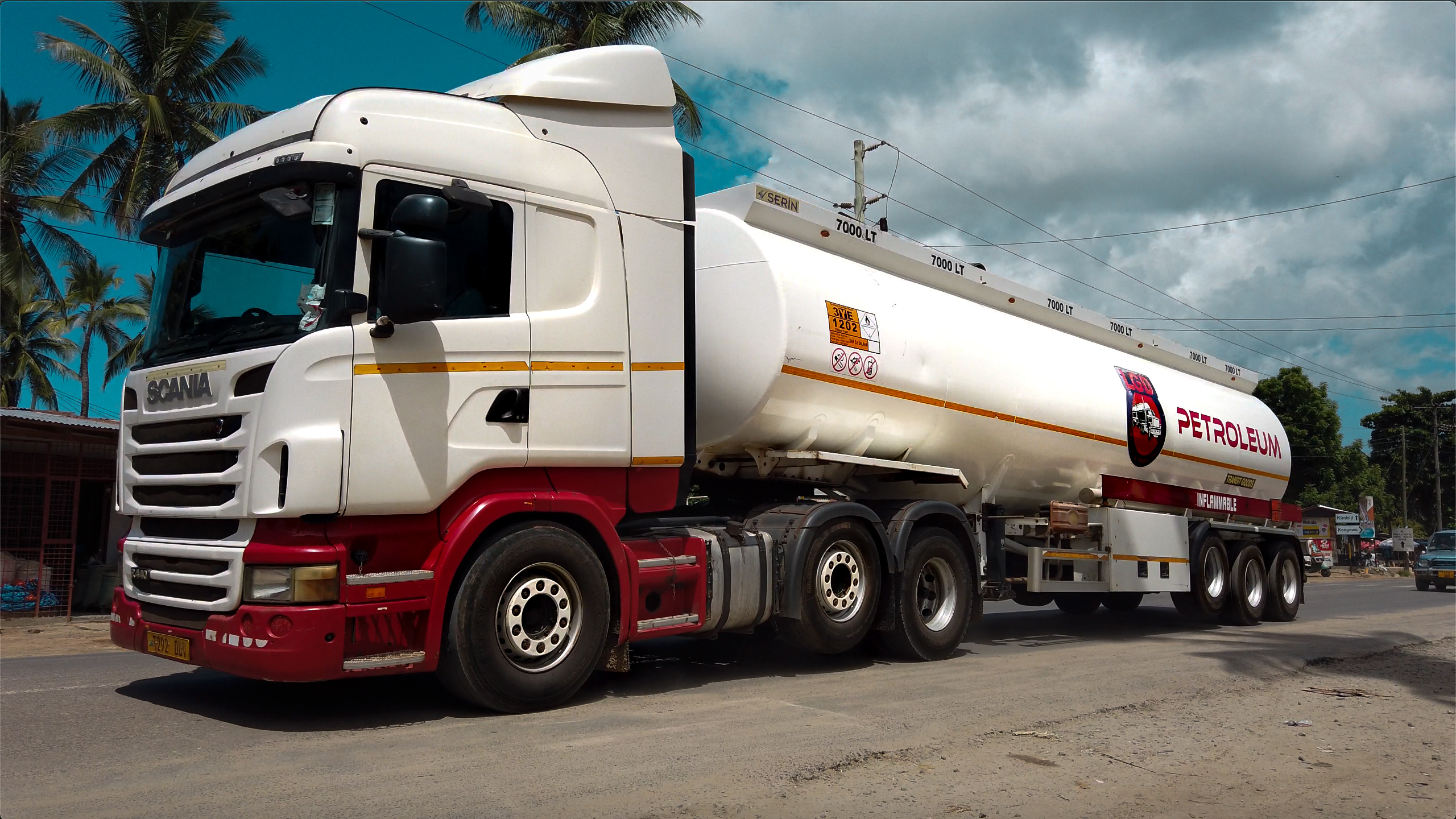
Examples of road transport: Nissan Tsuru (B13) (a car), Flying Pigeon roadster (a bike), Scania R440 (a truck).

Road transport or road transportation is a type of transport using roads. Transport on roads can be roughly grouped into the transportation of goods and transportation of people. In many countries licensing requirements and safety regulations ensure a separation of the two industries. Movement along roads may be by bike, automobile, bus, truck, or by animal such as horse or oxen. Standard networks of roads were adopted by Romans, Persians, Aztec, and other early empires, and may be regarded as a feature of empires. Cargo may be transported by trucking companies, while passengers may be transported via mass transit. Commonly defined features of modern roads include defined lanes and signage. Various classes of road exist, from two-lane local roads with at-grade intersections to controlled-access highways with all cross traffic grade-separated.

The nature of road transportation of goods depends on, apart from the degree of development of the local infrastructure, the distance the goods are transported by road, the weight and volume of an individual shipment, and the type of goods transported. For short distances and light small shipments, a van or pickup truck may be used. For large shipments even if less than a full truckload a truck is more appropriate. (Also see Trucking and Hauling below). In some countries cargo is transported by road in horse-drawn carriages, donkey carts or other non-motorized mode. Delivery services are sometimes considered a separate category from cargo transport. In many places, fast food is transported on roads by various types of vehicles. For inner city delivery of small packages and documents bike couriers are quite common.

People are transported on roads. Special modes of individual transport by road such as cycle rickshaws may also be locally available. There are also specialist modes of road transport for particular situations, such as ambulances.

== History ==
=== Early roads ===
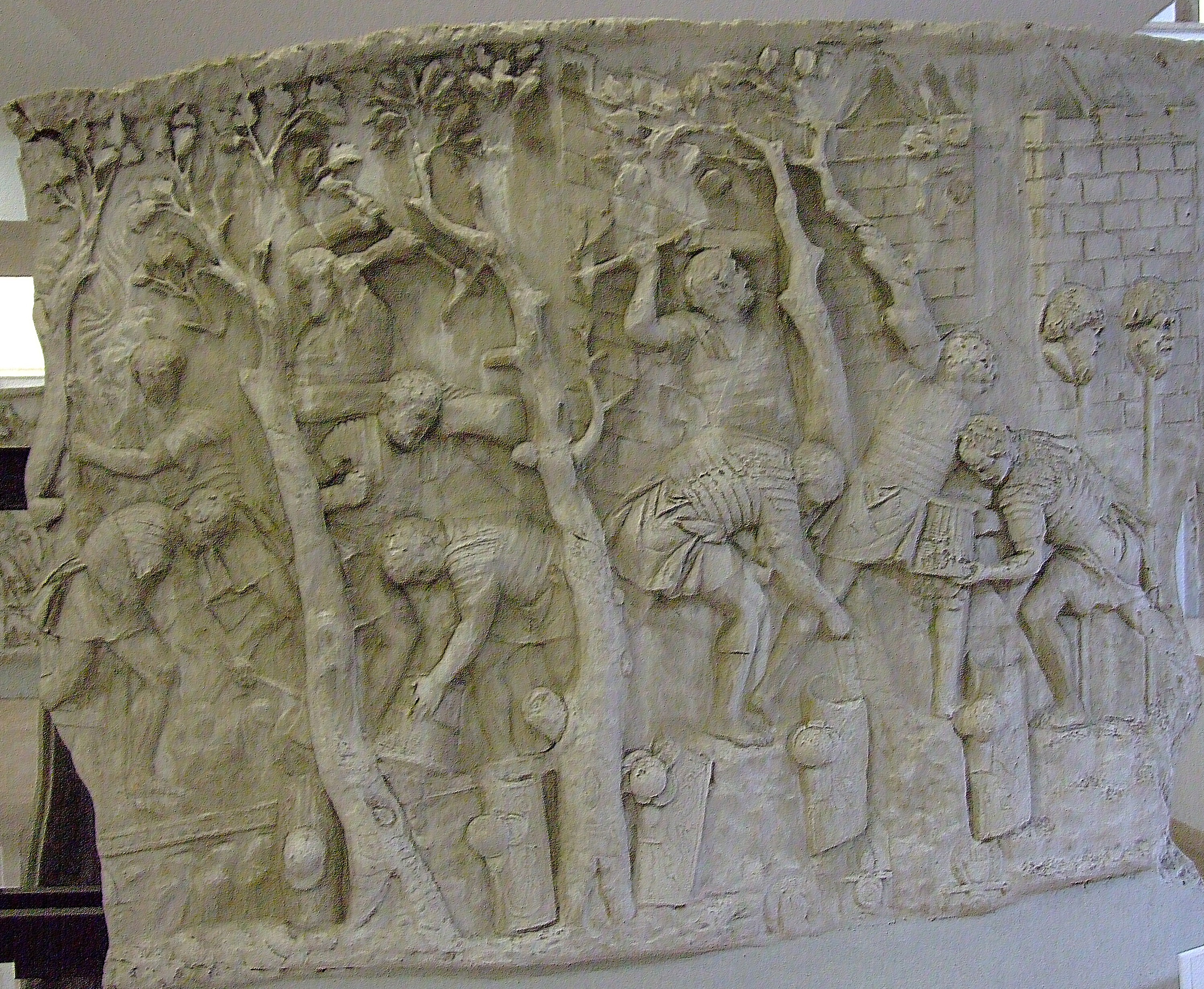
Road construction, depicted on Trajan's Column.

The first methods of road transport were horses, oxen or even humans carrying goods over dirt tracks that often followed game trail. The Persians later built a network of Royal Roads across their empire.

With the advent of the Roman Empire, there was a need for armies to be able to travel quickly from one region to another, and the roads that existed were often muddy, which greatly delayed the movement of large masses of troops. To resolve this issue, the Romans built solid and lasting roads. The Roman roads used deep roadbeds of crushed stone as an underlying layer to ensure that they kept dry, as the water would flow out from the crushed stone, instead of becoming mud in clay soils. The Islamic Caliphate later built tar-paved roads in Baghdad.

=== New road networks ===
As states developed and became richer, especially with the Renaissance, new roads and bridges began to be built, often based on Roman designs. Although there were attempts to rediscover Roman methods, there was little useful innovation in road building before the 18th century.

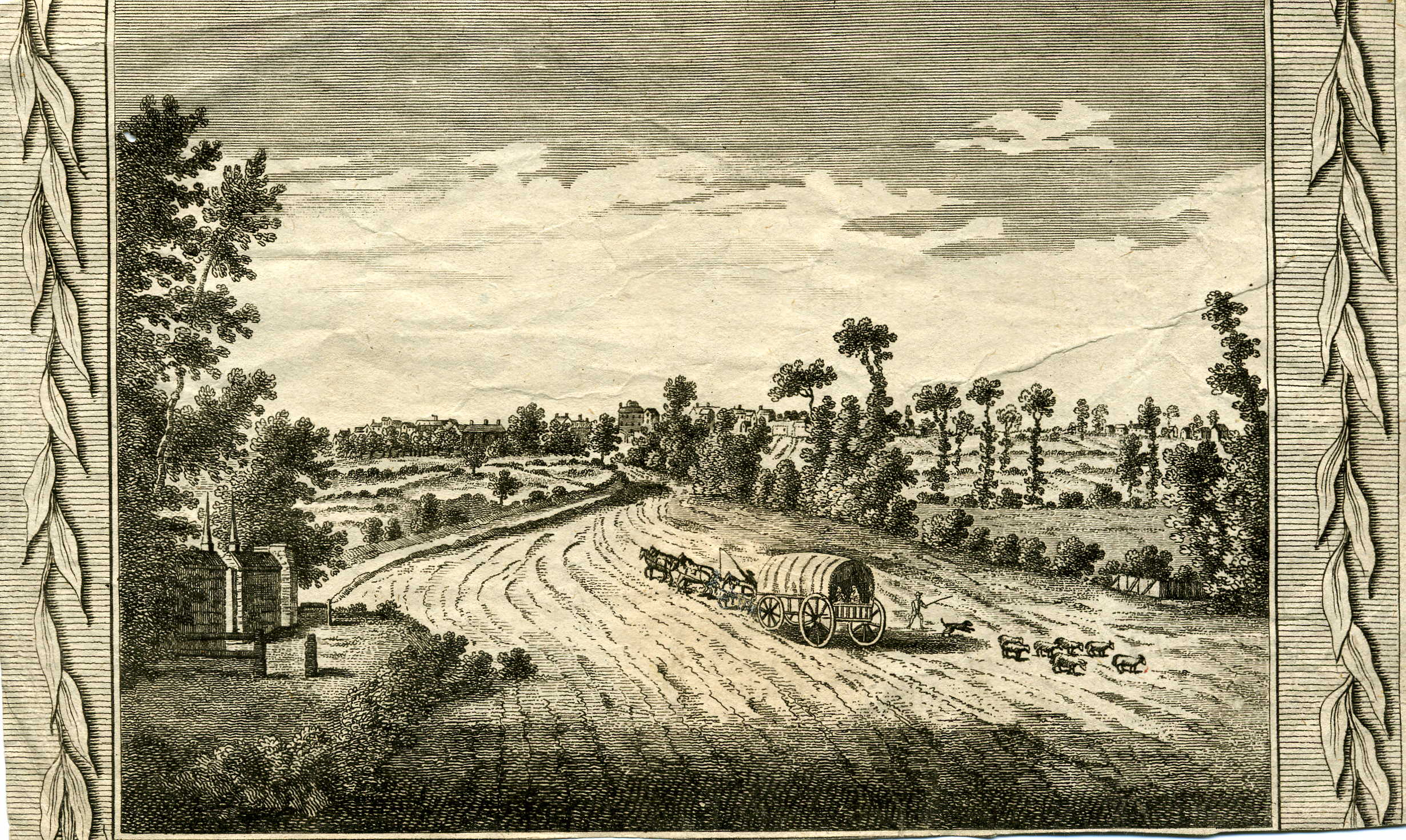
The Great North Road near High gate on the approach to London before turnpiking. The highway was deeply rutted and spread onto adjoining land.

Starting in the early 18th century, the British Parliament began to pass a series of acts that gave the local justices powers to erect toll-gates on the roads, in exchange for professional upkeep. The toll-gate erected at Wade's Mill became the first effective toll-gate in England. The first scheme that had trustees who were not justices was established through a turnpike act in 1707, for a section of the London-Chester road between Foothill and Stony Stafford. The basic principle was that the trustees would manage resources from the several parishes through which the highway passed, augment this with tolls from users from outside the parishes and apply the whole to the maintenance of the main highway. This became the pattern for the turnpiking of a growing number of highways, sought by those who wished to improve flow of commerce through their part of a county.

In 18th century West Africa, road transport throughout the Ashanti Empire was maintained via a network of well-kept roads that connected the Ashanti capital with territories within its jurisdiction and influence. After significant road construction undertaken by the kingdom of Dahomey, toll roads were established with the function of collecting yearly taxes based on the goods carried by the people of Dahomey and their occupation. The Royal Road was built in the late 18th century by King Kpengla which stretched from Abomey through Cana up to Ouidah.

The quality of early turnpike roads was varied. Although turnpiking did result in some improvement to each highway, the technologies used to deal with geological features, drainage, and the effects of weather were all in their infancy. Road construction improved slowly, initially through the efforts of individual surveyors such as John Metcalf in Yorkshire in the 1760s. British turnpike builders began to realize the importance of selecting clean stones for surfacing while excluding vegetable material and clay, resulting in more durable roads.

=== Industrial civil engineering ===
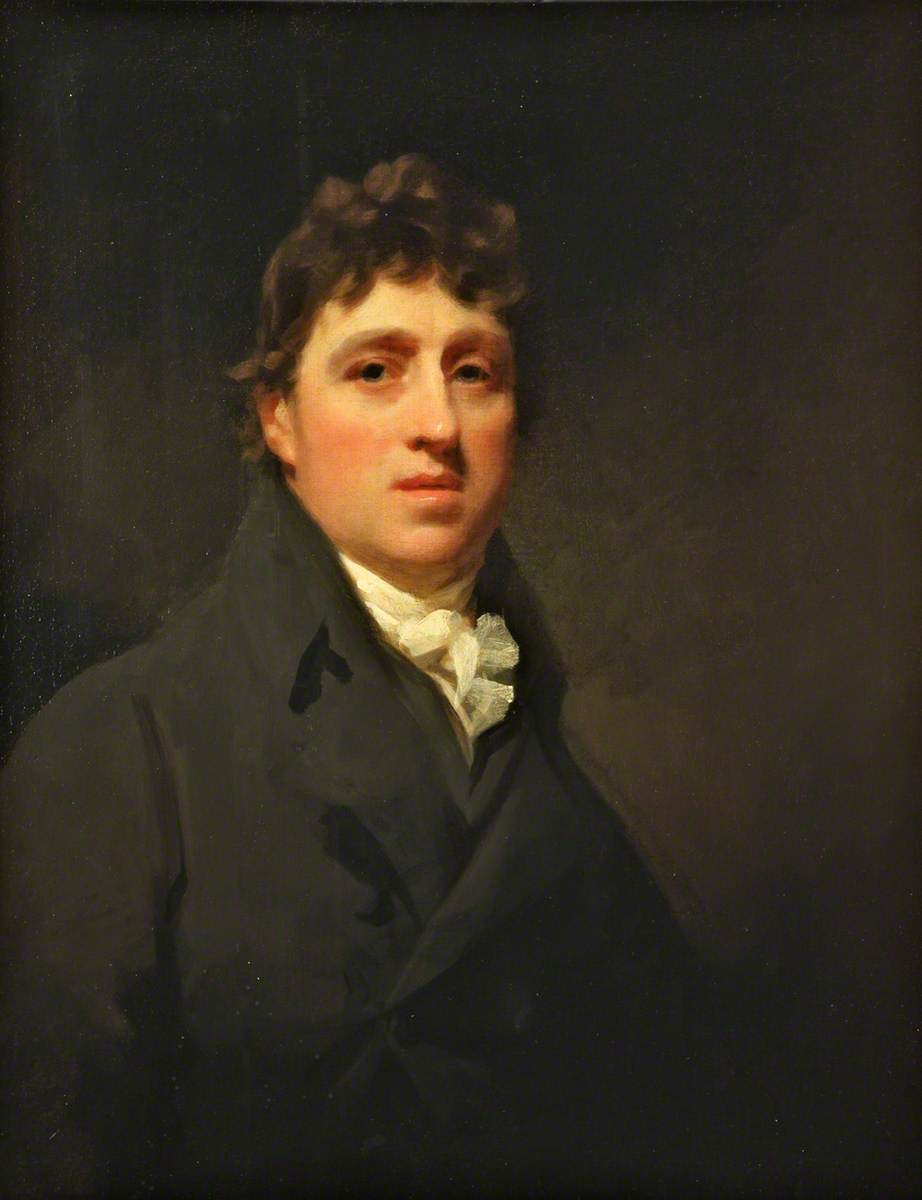
Thomas Telford, the "Colossus of the Roads" in early 19th century Britain.

By the late 18th and early 19th centuries, new methods of highway construction had been pioneered by the work of three British engineers, John Metcalf, Thomas Telford and John Loudon McAdam, and by the French road engineer Pierre-Marie-Jérôme Trésaguet.

The first professional road builder to emerge during the Industrial Revolution was John Metcalf, who constructed about 180 miles (290 km) of turnpike road, mainly in the north of England, from 1765. He believed a good road should have good foundations, be well drained and have a smooth convex surface to allow rainwater to drain quickly into ditches at the side. He understood the importance of good drainage, knowing it was rain that caused most problems on the roads.

Pierre-Marie-Jérôme Trésaguet established the first scientific approach to road building in France at the same time. He wrote a memorandum on his method in 1775, which became general practice in France. It involved a layer of large rocks, covered by a layer of smaller gravel. The lower layer improved on Roman practice in that it was based on the understanding that the purpose of this layer (the sub-base or base course) is to transfer the weight of the road and its traffic to the ground, while protecting the ground from deformation by spreading the weight evenly. Therefore, the sub-base did not have to be a self-supporting structure. The upper running surface provided a smooth surface for vehicles while protecting the large stones of the sub-base.

The surveyor and engineer Thomas Telford also made substantial advances in the engineering of new roads and the construction of bridges. His method of road building involved the digging of a large trench in which a foundation of heavy rock was set. He also designed his roads so that they sloped downwards from the centre, allowing drainage to take place, a major improvement on the work of Trésaguet. The surface of his roads consisted of broken stone. He also improved on methods for the building of roads by improving the selection of stone based on thickness, taking into account traffic, alignment and slopes. During his later years, Telford was responsible for rebuilding sections of the London to Holyhead road, a task completed by his assistant of ten years, John MacNeill.

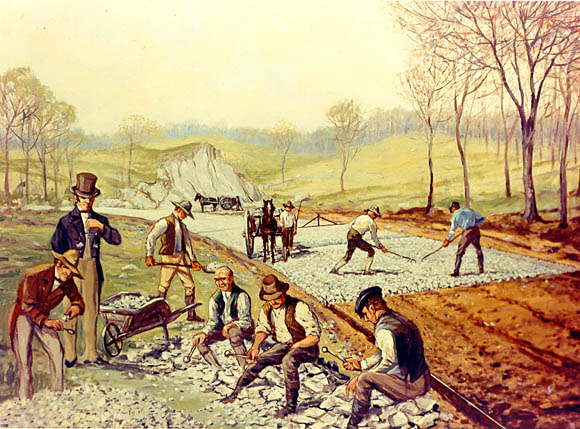
Construction of the first macadamized road in the United States (1823). In the foreground, workers are breaking stones "so as not to exceed 6 ounces in weight or to pass a two-inch ring".

It was another Scottish engineer, John Loudon McAdam, who designed the first modern roads. He developed an inexpensive paving material of soil and stone aggregate (known as macadam). His road building method was simpler than Telford's, yet more effective at protecting roadways: he discovered that massive foundations of rock upon rock were unnecessary, and asserted that native soil alone would support the road and traffic upon it, as long as it was covered by a road crust that would protect the soil underneath from water and wear.

Also unlike Telford and other road builders, McAdam laid his roads as level as possible. His 30-foot-wide (9 m) road required only a rise of three inches from the edges to the center. Cambering and elevation of the road above the water table enabled rainwater to run off into ditches on either side. Size of stones was central to the McAdam's road building theory. The lower 200-millimetre (8 in) road thickness was restricted to stones no larger than 75 millimetres (3.0 in). The upper 50-millimetre (2 in) layer of stones was limited to 20 millimetres (1 in) size and stones were checked by supervisors who carried scales. A workman could check the stone size himself by seeing if the stone would fit into his mouth. The importance of the 20 mm stone size was that the stones needed to be much smaller than the 100 mm width of the iron carriage tyres that traveled on the road. Macadam roads were being built widely in the United States and Australia in the 1820s and in Europe in the 1830s and 1840s.

=== 20th century ===
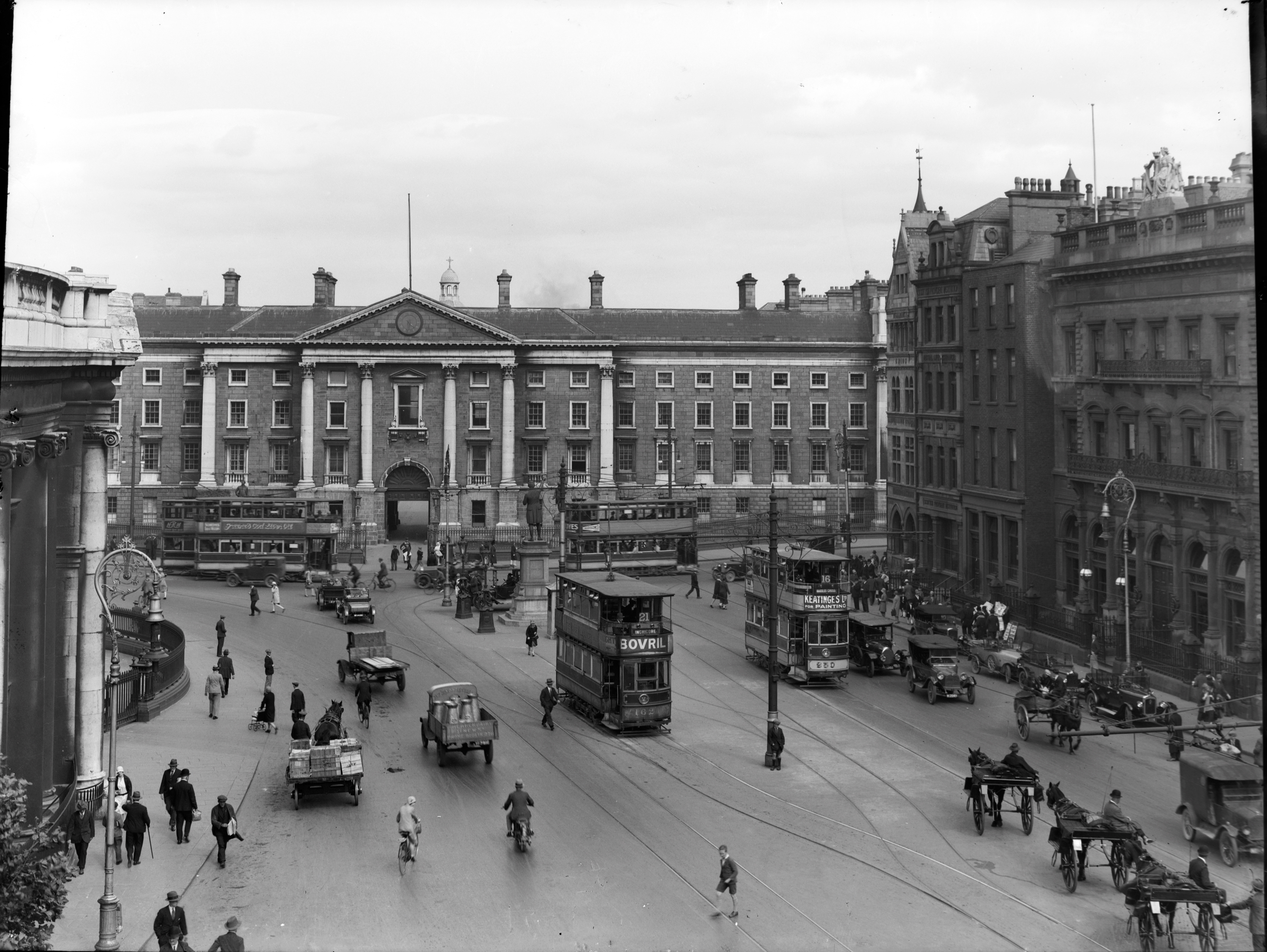
Modes of road transport in Dublin, 1929

Macadam roads were adequate for use by horses and carriages or coaches, but they were very dusty and subject to erosion with heavy rain. The Good Roads Movement occurred in the United States between the late 1870s and the 1920s. Advocates for improved roads led by bicyclists turned local agitation into a national political movement.

Outside cities, roads were dirt or gravel; mud in the winter and dust in the summer. Early organizers cited Europe where road construction and maintenance was supported by national and local governments. In its early years, the main goal of the movement was education for road building in rural areas between cities and to help rural populations gain the social and economic benefits enjoyed by cities where citizens benefited from railroads, trolleys and paved streets. Even more than traditional vehicles, the newly invented bicycles could benefit from good country roads. Later on, they did not hold up to higher-speed motor vehicle use. Methods to stabilise macadam roads with tar date back to at least 1834 when John Henry Cassell, operating from Cassell's Patent Lava Stone Works in Millwall, patented "Pitch Macadam". This method involved spreading tar on the subgrade, placing a typical macadam layer, and finally sealing the macadam with a mixture of tar and sand. Tar-grouted macadam was in use well before 1900 and involved scarifying the surface of an existing macadam pavement, spreading tar, and re-compacting. Although the use of tar in road construction was known in the 19th century, it was little used and was not introduced on a large scale until the motorcar arrived on the scene in the early 20th century.

Modern tarmac was patented by British civil engineer Edgar Purnell Hooley, who noticed that spilled tar on the roadway kept the dust down and created a smooth surface. He took out a patent in 1901 for tarmac. Hooley's 1901 patent involved mechanically mixing tar and aggregate prior to lay-down and then compacting the mixture with a steamroller. The tar was modified by adding small amounts of Portland cement, resin, and pitch.

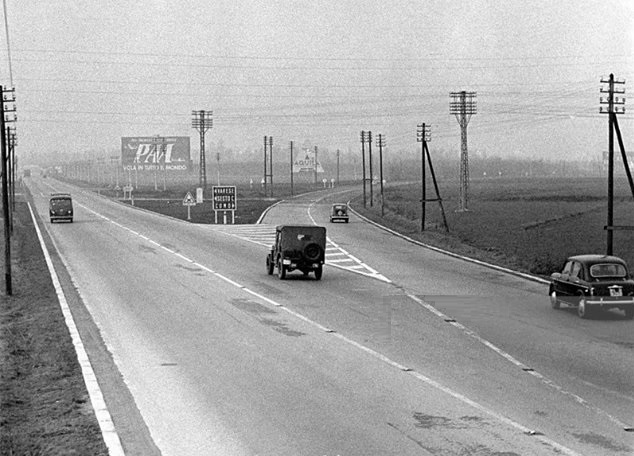
The Italian Autostrada dei Laghi ("Lakes Motorway" in the 1950s; now parts of the Autostrada A8 and the Autostrada A9), the first controlled-access highway ever built in the world

The first version of modern controlled-access highways evolved during the first half of the 20th century. The Long Island Motor Parkway on Long Island, New York, opened in 1908 as a private venture, was the world's first limited-access roadway. It included many modern features, including banked turns, guard rails and reinforced concrete tarmac. Traffic could turn left between the parkway and connectors, crossing oncoming traffic, so it was not a controlled-access highway (or "freeway" as later defined by the federal government's Manual on Uniform Traffic Control Devices).

Modern controlled-access highways originated in the early 1920s in response to the rapidly increasing use of the automobile, the demand for faster movement between cities and as a consequence of improvements in paving processes, techniques and materials. These original high-speed roads were referred to as "dual highways" and have been modernized and are still in use today.

Italy was the first country in the world to build controlled-access highways reserved for fast traffic and for motor vehicles only. The Autostrada dei Laghi ("Lakes Motorway"), the first built in the world, connecting Milan to Lake Como and Lake Maggiore, and now parts of the A8 and A9 motorways, was devised by Piero Puricelli and was inaugurated in 1924. This motorway, called autostrada, contained only one lane in each direction and no interchanges. The Bronx River Parkway was the first road in North America to utilize a median strip to separate the opposing lanes, to be constructed through a park and where intersecting streets crossed over bridges. The Southern State Parkway opened in 1927, while the Long Island Motor Parkway was closed in 1937 and replaced by the Northern State Parkway (opened 1931) and the contiguous Grand Central Parkway (opened 1936). In Germany, construction of the Bonn-Cologne Autobahn began in 1929 and was opened in 1932 by Konrad Adenauer, then the mayor of Cologne.

In Canada, the first precursor with semi-controlled access was The Middle Road between Hamilton and Toronto, which featured a median divider between opposing traffic flow, as well as the nation's first cloverleaf interchange. This highway developed into the Queen Elizabeth Way, which featured a cloverleaf and trumpet interchange when it opened in 1937 and until the Second World War boasted the longest illuminated stretch of roadway built. A decade later, the first section of Highway 401 was opened, based on earlier designs. It has since become North America's busiest highway.

The word freeway was first used in February 1930 by Edward M. Bassett. Bassett argued that roads should be classified into three basic types: highways, parkways, and freeways. In Bassett's zoning and property law-based system, abutting property owners have the rights of light, air and access to highways but to not parkways and freeways; the latter two are distinguished in that the purpose of a parkway is recreation, while the purpose of a freeway is movement. Thus as originally conceived, a freeway is a strip of public land devoted to movement to which abutting property owners do not have rights of light, air or access.

== Trucking and haulage ==
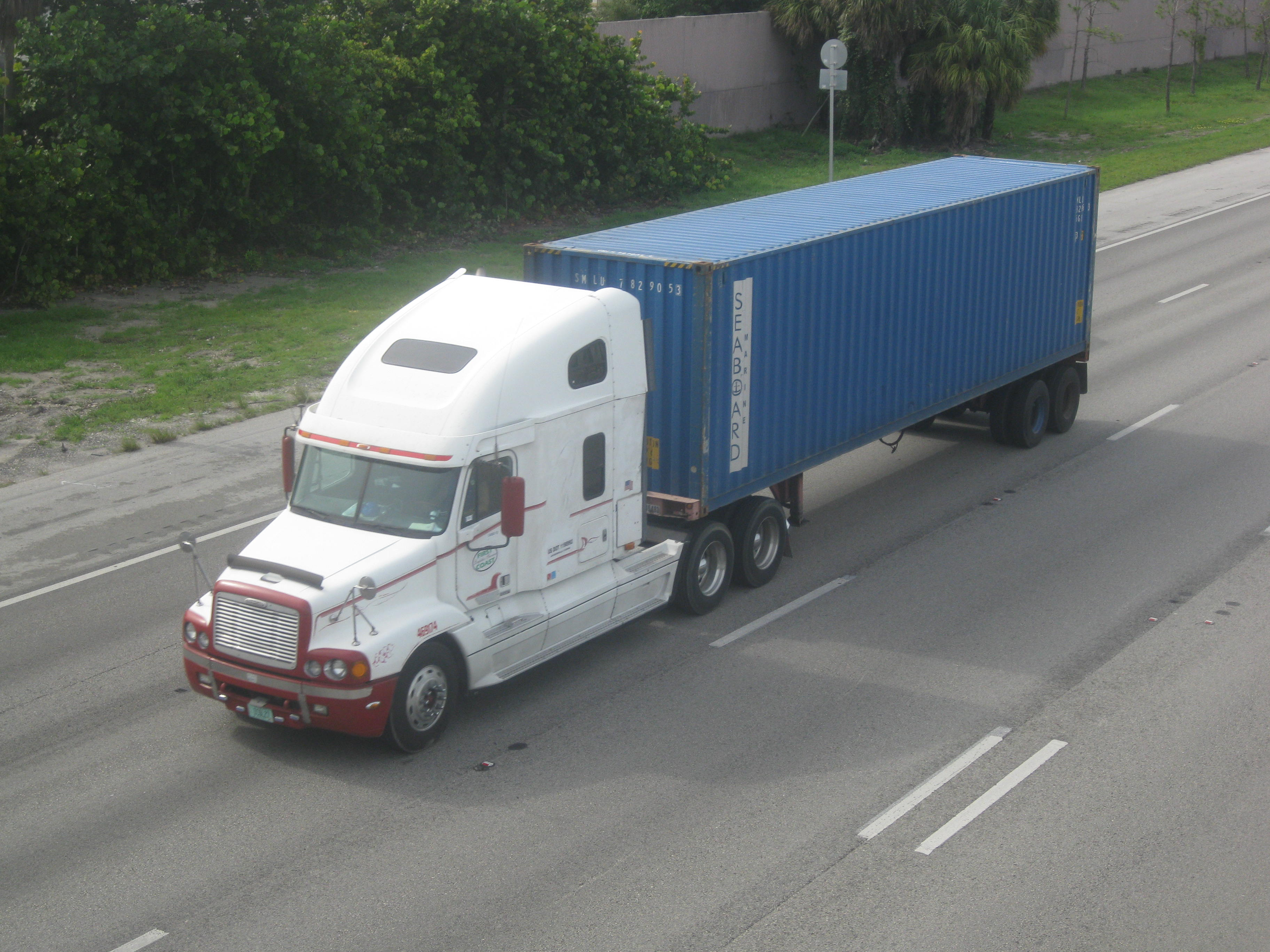
A truck transporting a container on Interstate 95 in South Florida.

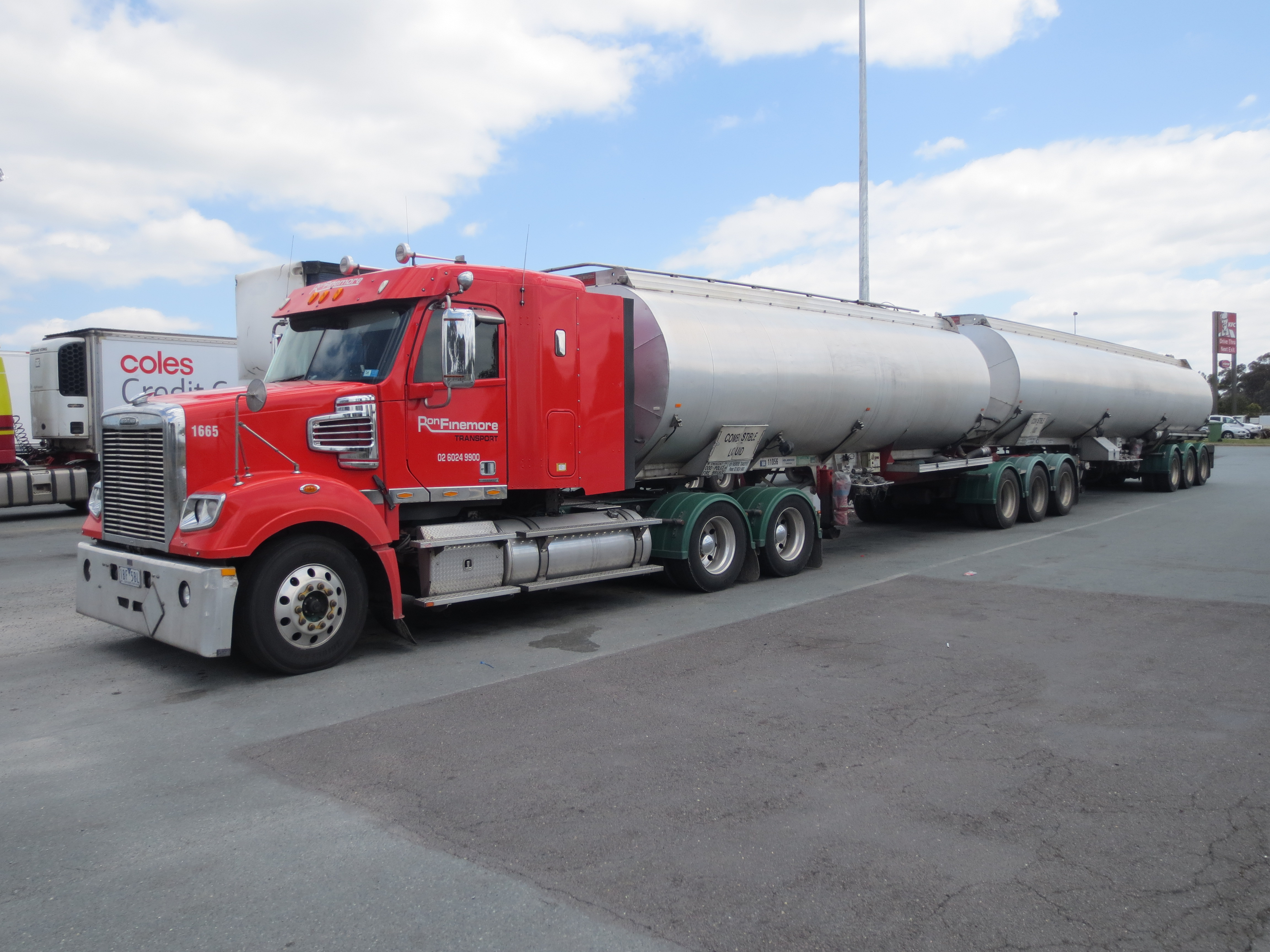
B double parked near the Hume Highway

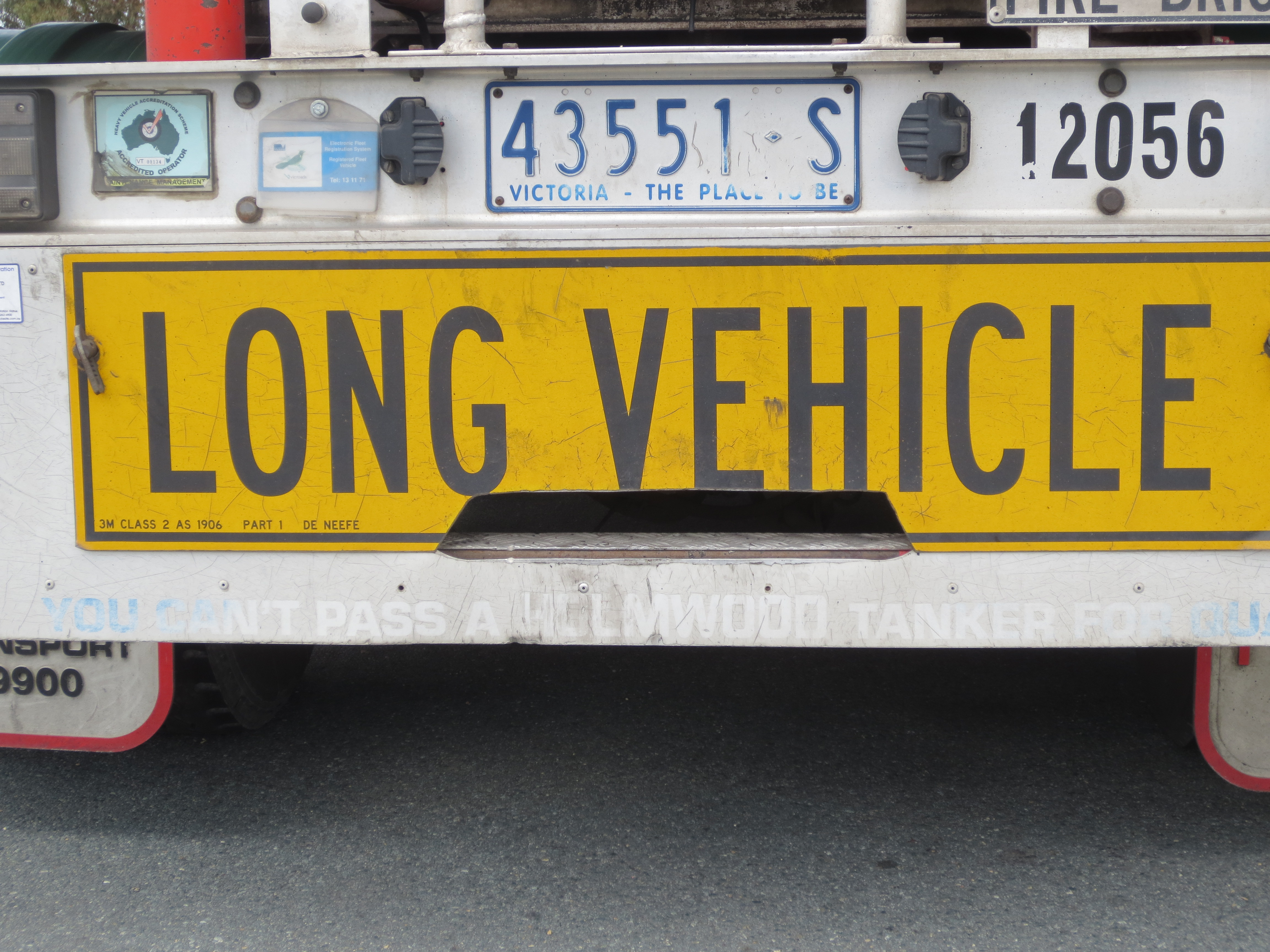
and safety sign on rear

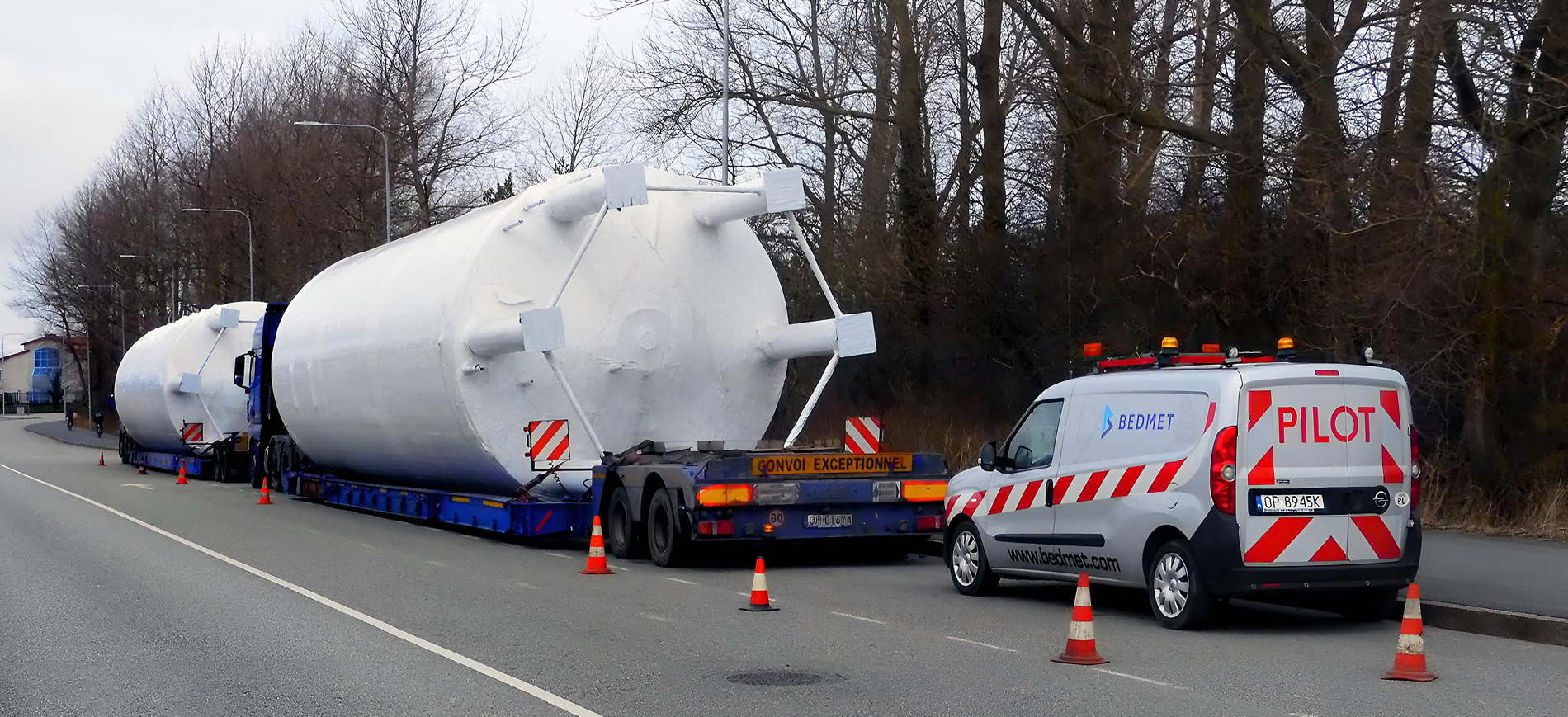
The Polish transport company Bedmet uses a special vehicle to transport two large silos.

Trucking companies (in American English terminology) or haulage companies (or hauliers) (in British English) accept cargo for road transport. Truck drivers operate either independently, working directly for the client, or through freight carriers or shipping agents. Some large companies (such as grocery store chains) operate their own internal trucking operations. The market size for general freight trucking was nearly $125 billion in 2010.

In the U.S. many truckers own their truck (rig) and are known as owner-operators. Some road transportation is done on regular routes or for only one consignee per run (full truckload), while others transport goods from many different loading stations and shippers to various consignees per run (less-than-truckload shipping). On some long runs, only cargo for one leg of the route is known when the cargo is loaded. Truckers may have to wait at the destination for a backhaul.

A bill of lading issued by the shipper provides the basic documentation for road freight. On cross-international border transportation, the trucker will present the cargo and documentation provided by the shipper to customs for inspection (for the European Community, see also Schengen Agreement). This also applies to shipments that are transported out of a free port.

=== Hours of service ===
To avoid accidents caused by fatigue, truckers must adhere to strict rules for driving time and required rest periods. In the United States and Canada, these regulations are known as hours of service, and in the European Union as drivers' working hours. One such regulation is the Hours of Work and Rest Periods (Road Transport) Convention, 1979. Tachographs or electronic on-board recorders record the times the vehicle is in motion and stopped. Some companies use two drivers per truck to ensure uninterrupted transportations, with one driver resting in a bunk in the back of the cab while the other is driving.

=== Licenses ===
Truck drivers often need special licenses to drive, known in the U.S. as commercial driver's licenses. In the U.K. a large goods vehicle licence is required. For transport of hazardous materials or dangerous goods, truckers must have a separate licence that usually requires them to pass an exam (as in the EU). They must affix proper labels for the respective hazard(s) to their vehicle. Liquid goods are transported by road in tank trucks (in American English) or tanker lorries (in British English) (also "road tankers"") or special tank containers for intermodal transport. For transportation of live animals, special requirements must be met in many countries to prevent cruelty to animals (see animal rights). For fresh and frozen goods, refrigerator trucks or reefers are used.

=== Weights ===
Some loads are weighed at the point of origin and the driver is responsible for ensuring weights conform to maximum allowed standards. This may involve using on-board weight gauges (load pressure gauges), knowing the empty weight of the transport vehicle and the weight of the load, or using a commercial weight scale. In-route weigh stations may only check that gross vehicle weights do not exceed the maximum weight for that particular jurisdiction and will include individual axle weights. This varies by country and by states within a country, and may include federal standards. The United States uses FMCSA federal standards that include bridge law formulas. Many states, not on the national road system, use their own road and bridge standards. Enforcement scales may include portable scales, scale houses with low-speed scales, or weigh-in-motion (WIM) scales.

The European Union uses the International Recommendation, OIML R 134-2 (2009). The process may involve a scale house and low-speed scales or higher-speed WIM road or bridge scales with the goal of public safety, as well as road and bridge safety, according to the Bridges Act.

== Modern roads ==
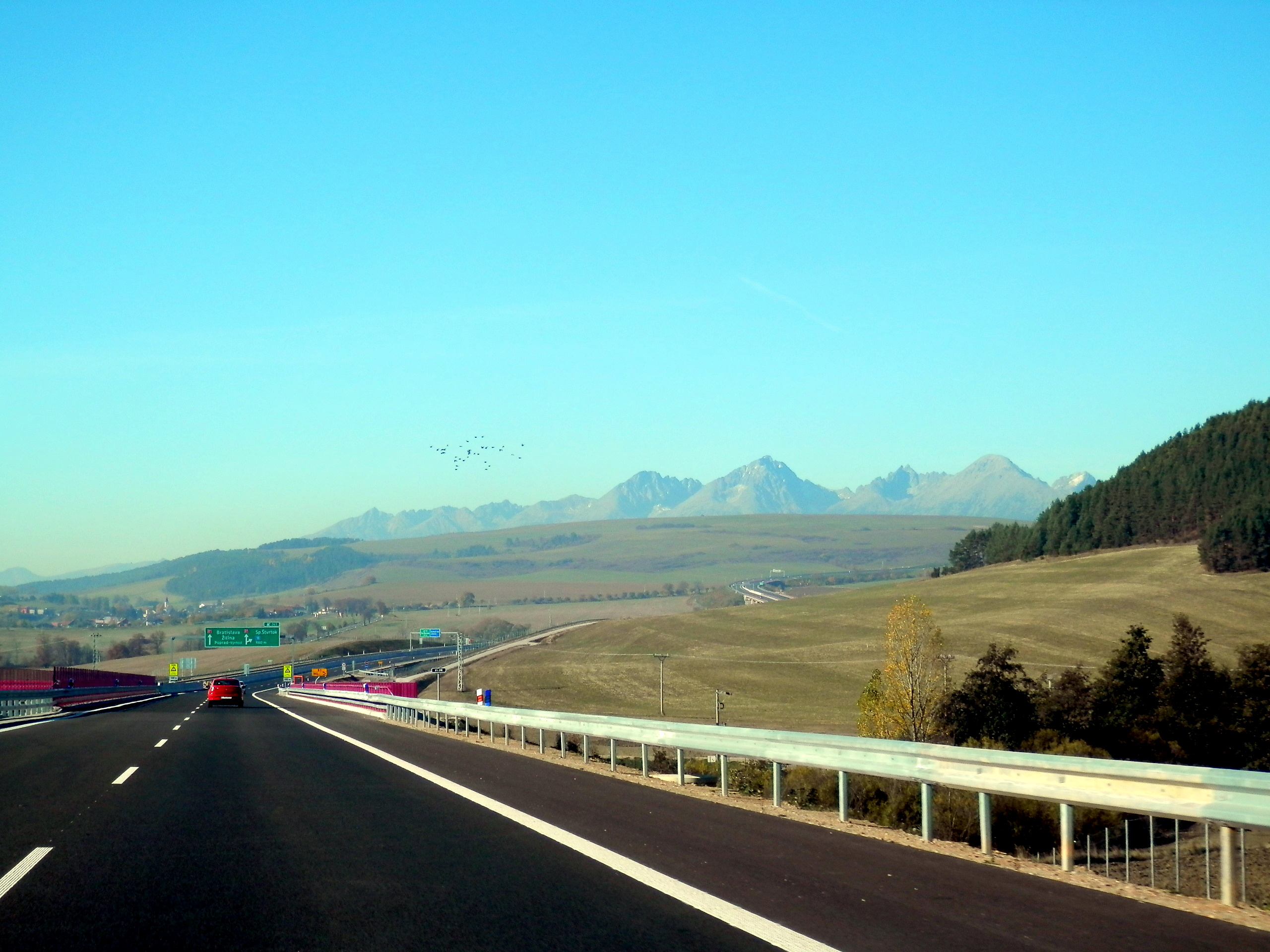
Highway D1 in Slovakia.

Today, roadways are primarily asphalt or concrete. Both are based on McAdam's concept of stone aggregate in a binder, asphalt cement or Portland cement respectively. Asphalt is known as a flexible pavement, one which slowly will "flow" under the pounding of traffic. Concrete is a rigid pavement, which can take heavier loads but is more expensive and requires more carefully prepared subbase. So, generally, major roads are concrete and local roads are asphalt. Concrete roads are often covered with a thin layer of asphalt to create a wearing surface.

Modern pavements are designed for heavier vehicle loads and faster speeds, requiring thicker slabs and deeper subbase. Subbase is the layer or successive layers of stone, gravel and sand supporting the pavement. It is needed to spread out the slab load bearing on the underlying soil and to conduct away any water getting under the slabs. Water will undermine a pavement over time, so much of pavement and pavement joint design are meant to minimize the amount of water getting and staying under the slabs.

Shoulders are also an integral part of highway design. They are multipurpose; they can provide a margin of side clearance, a refuge for incapacitated vehicles, an emergency lane, and parking space. They also serve a design purpose, and that is to prevent water from percolating into the soil near the main pavement's edge. Shoulder pavement is designed to a lower standard than the pavement in the traveled way and won't hold up as well to traffic, so driving on the shoulder is generally prohibited.

Pavement technology is still evolving, albeit in not easily noticed increments. For instance, chemical additives in the pavement mix make the pavement more weather resistant, grooving and other surface treatments improve resistance to skidding and hydroplaning, and joint seals which were once tar are now made of low maintenance neoprene.

=== Traffic control ===
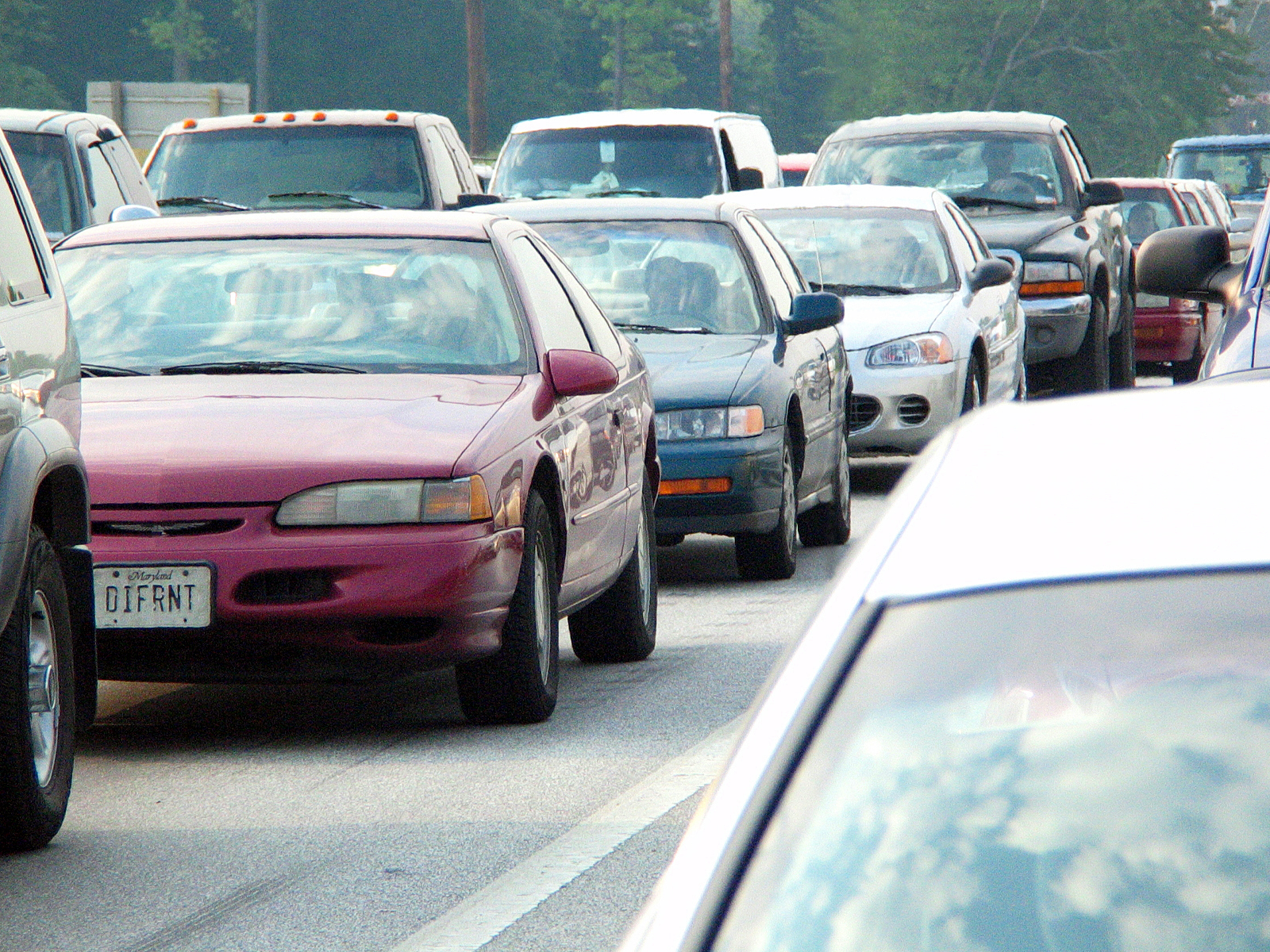
Disruptions in organized traffic flow can create delays lasting hours.

Nearly all roadways are built with devices meant to control traffic. Most notable to the motorist are those meant to communicate directly with the driver. Broadly, these fall into three categories: signs, signals or pavement markings. They help the driver navigate; they assign the right-of-way at intersections; they indicate laws such as speed limits and parking regulations; they advise of potential hazards; they indicate passing and no passing zones; and otherwise deliver information and to assure traffic is orderly and safe.

Two hundred years ago these devices were signs, nearly all informal. In the late 19th century signals began to appear in the biggest cities at a few highly congested intersections. They were manually operated, and consisted of semaphores, flags or paddles, or in some cases colored electric lights, all modeled on railroad signals. In the 20th century signals were automated, at first with electromechanical devices and later with computers. Signals can be quite sophisticated: with vehicle sensors embedded in the pavement, the signal can control and choreograph the turning movements of heavy traffic in the most complex of intersections. In the 1920s traffic engineers learned how to coordinate signals along a thoroughfare to increase its speeds and volumes. In the 1980s, with computers, similar coordination of whole networks became possible.

In the 1920s pavement markings were introduced. Initially they were used to indicate the road's centerline. Soon after they were coded with information to aid motorists in passing safely. Later, with multi-lane roads they were used to define lanes. Other uses, such as indicating permitted turning movements and pedestrian crossings soon followed.

In the 20th century traffic control devices were standardized. Before then every locality decided on what its devices would look like and where they would be applied. This could be confusing, especially to traffic from outside the locality. In the United States standardization was first taken at the state level, and late in the century at the federal level. Each country has a Manual of Uniform Traffic Control Devices (MUTCD) and there are efforts to blend them into a worldwide standard.

Besides signals, signs, and markings, other forms of traffic control are designed and built into the roadway. For instance, curbs and rumble strips can be used to keep traffic in a given lane and median barriers can prevent left turns and even U-turns.

=== Toll roads ===
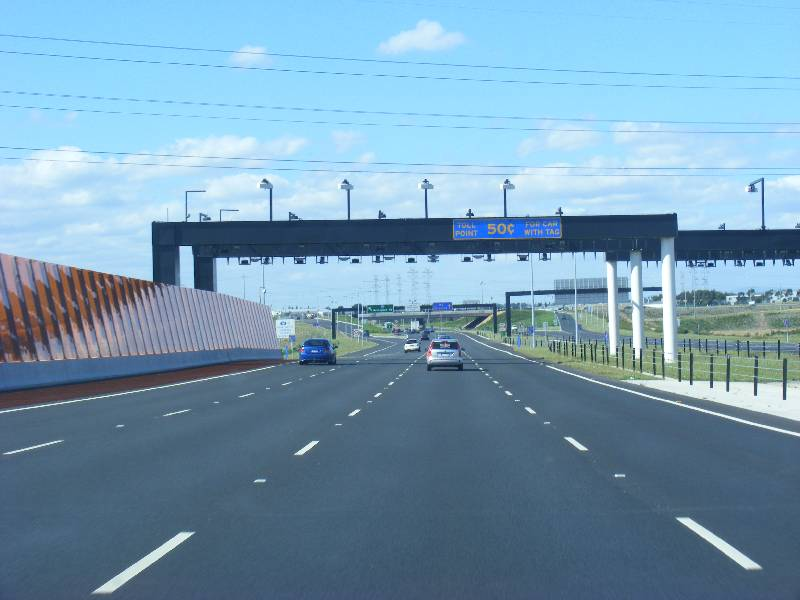
Eastlink - Wellington Rd Northbound Toll Gantry

Early toll roads were usually built by private companies under a government franchise. They typically paralleled or replaced routes already with some volume of commerce, hoping the improved road would divert enough traffic to make the enterprise profitable. Plank roads were particularly attractive as they greatly reduced rolling resistance and mitigated the problem of getting mired in mud. Another improvement, better grading to lessen the steepness of the worst stretches, allowed draft animals to haul heavier loads.

A toll road in the United States is often called a turnpike. The term turnpike probably originated from the gate, often a simple pike, which blocked passage until the fare was paid at a toll house (or toll booth in current terminology). When the toll was paid the pike, which was mounted on a swivel, was turned to allow the vehicle to pass. Tolls were usually based on the type of cargo being transported, not the type of vehicle. The practice of selecting routes so as to avoid tolls is called shunpiking. This may be simply to avoid the expense, as a form of economic protest (or boycott), or simply to seek a road less traveled as a bucolic interlude.

Companies were formed to build, improve, and maintain a particular section of roadway, and tolls were collected from users to finance the enterprise. The enterprise was usually named to indicate the locale of its roadway, often including the name of one of both of the termini. The word turnpike came into common use in the names of these roadways and companies, and is essentially used interchangeably with toll road in current terminology.

In the United States, toll roads began with the Lancaster Turnpike in the 1790s, within Pennsylvania, connecting Philadelphia and Lancaster. In the state of New York, the Great Western Turnpike was started in Albany in 1799 and eventually extended, by several alternate routes, to near what is now Syracuse, New York.

Toll roads peaked in the mid 19th century, and by the turn of the twentieth century most toll roads were taken over by state highway departments. The demise of this early toll road era was due to the rise of canals and railroads, which were more efficient (and thus cheaper) in moving freight over long distances. Roads wouldn't again be competitive with rails and barges until the first half of the 20th century when the internal combustion engine replaces draft animals as the source of motive power.

With the development, mass production, and popular embrace of the automobile, faster and higher capacity roads were needed. In the 1920s limited access highways appeared. Their main characteristics were dual roadways with access points limited to (but not always) grade-separated interchanges. Their dual roadways allowed high volumes of traffic, the need for no or few traffic lights along with relatively gentle grades and curves allowed higher speeds.

The first limited access highways were Parkways, so called because of their often park-like landscaping and, in the metropolitan New York City area, they connected the region's system of parks. When the German autobahns built in the 1930s introduced higher design standards and speeds, road planners and road-builders in the United States started developing and building toll roads to similar high standards. The Pennsylvania Turnpike, which largely followed the path of a partially built railroad, was the first, opening in 1940.

After 1940 with the Pennsylvania Turnpike, toll roads saw a resurgence, this time to fund limited access highways. In the late 1940s and early 1950s, after World War II interrupted the evolution of the highway, the US resumed building toll roads. They were to still higher standards and one road, the New York State Thruway, had standards that became the prototype for the U.S. Interstate Highway System. Several other major toll-roads which connected with the Pennsylvania Turnpike were established before the creation of the Interstate Highway System. These were the Indiana Toll Road, Ohio Turnpike, and New Jersey Turnpike.

==== Interstate Highway System ====
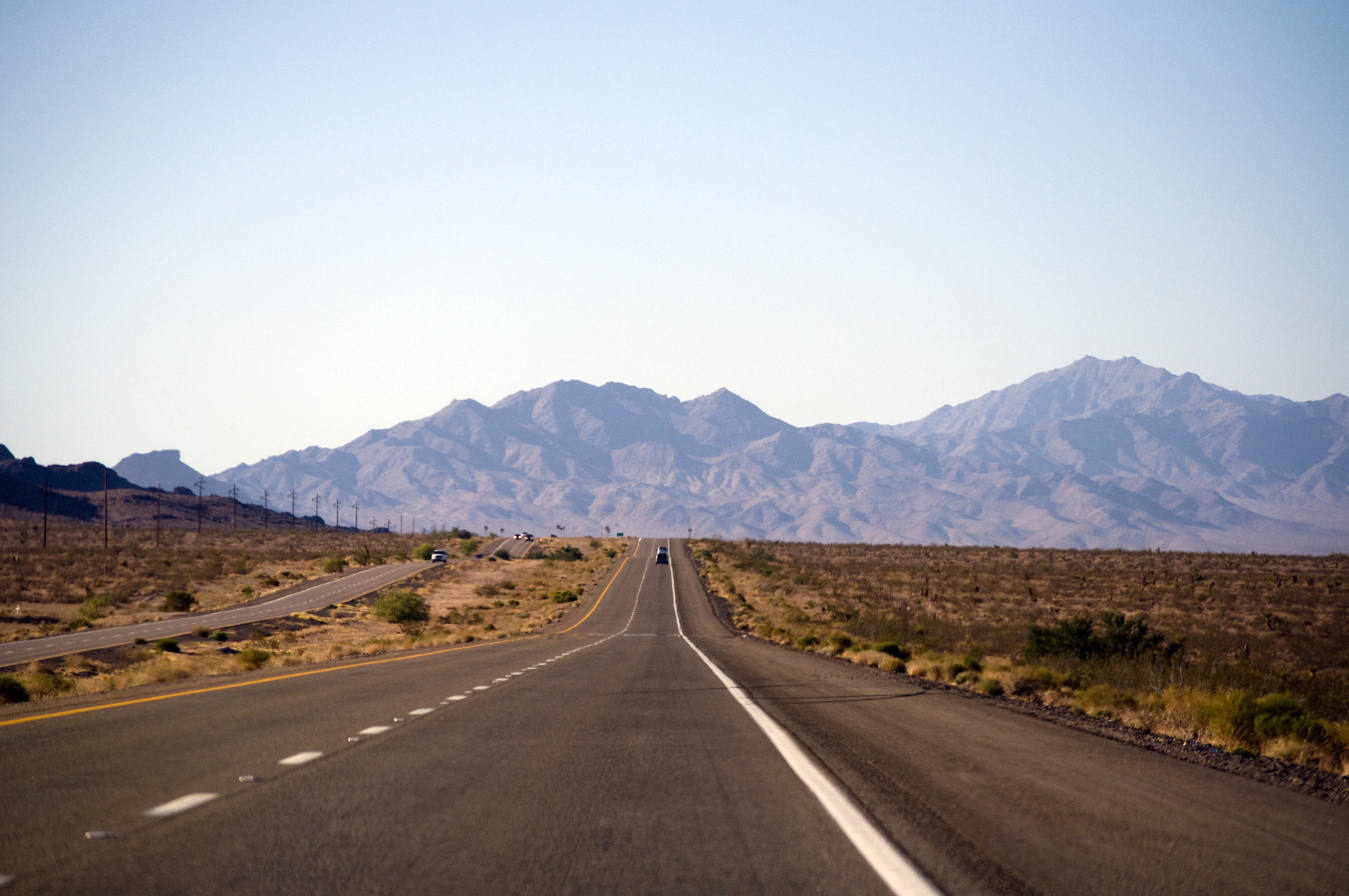
Arizona - North America - Southwest - Interstate Highway System (4893585908)

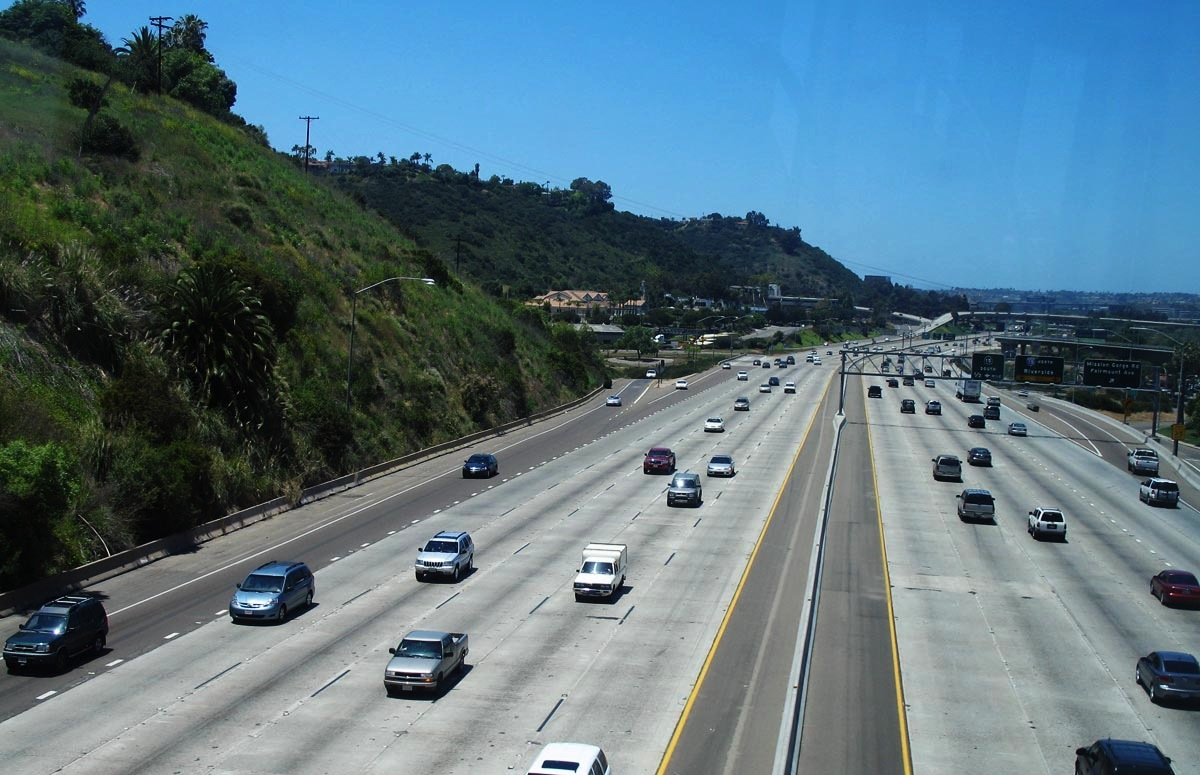
San Diego Trolley over Interstate 8

In the United States, beginning in 1956, Dwight D. Eisenhower National System of Interstate and Defense Highways, commonly called the Interstate Highway System was built. It uses 12 foot (3.65m) lanes, wide medians, a maximum of 4% grade, and full access control, though many sections don't meet these standards due to older construction or constraints. This system created a continental-sized network meant to connect every population center of 50,000 people or more.

By 1956, most limited access highways in the eastern United States were toll roads. In that year, the Federal Aid Highway Act of 1956 was passed, funding non-toll roads with 90% federal dollars and 10% state match, giving little incentive for states to expand their turnpike system. Funding rules initially restricted collections of tolls on newly funded roadways, bridges, and tunnels. In some situations, expansion or rebuilding of a toll facility using Interstate Highway Program funding resulted in the removal of existing tolls. This occurred in Virginia on Interstate 64 at the Hampton Roads Bridge-Tunnel when a second parallel roadway to the regional 1958 bridge-tunnel was completed in 1976.

Since the completion of the initial portion of the Interstate Highway System, regulations were changed, and portions of toll facilities have been added to the system. Some states are again looking at toll financing for new roads and maintenance, to supplement limited federal funding. In some areas, new road projects have been completed with public-private partnerships funded by tolls, such as the Pocahontas Parkway (I-895) near Richmond, Virginia.

The newest policy passed by Congress and the Obama administration regarding highways is the Surface and Air Transportation Programs Extension Act of 2011.

=== Pneumatic tyres ===
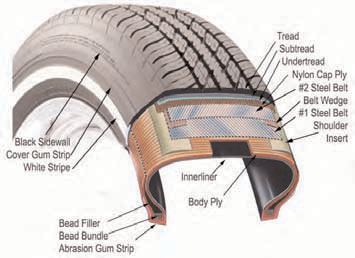
Tire components -- NHTSA The Pneumatic Tire

As the horse-drawn carriage was replaced by the car, bus and lorry or truck, and speeds increased, the need for smoother roads and less vertical displacement became more apparent, and pneumatic tyres were developed to decrease the apparent roughness. Wagon and carriage wheels, made of wood, had a tyre in the form of an iron strip that kept the wheel from wearing out quickly. Pneumatic tyres, which had a larger footprint than iron tyres, also were less likely to get bogged down in the mud on unpaved roads.

== See also ==
- National Highway System (United States)
- Passenger vehicles in the United States
- Transportation in the United States
- National Transportation Safety Board
- German autobahns
- Glossary of road transport terms
- Neo-bulk cargo
- Public transport
- Traffic congestion
- Transportation forecasting
- Transport engineering
- List of roads and highways
- Portal:Transport/Trucking media
- Portal:Transport/Highway media

== Bibliography ==
- Lay, M. G. (1992). Ways of the World: A History of the World's Roads and of the Vehicles That Used Them. Sydney: Primavera Press. ISBN 1-875368-05-1.
