= History of infrastructure =

Infrastructure before 1700 consisted mainly of roads and canals. Canals were used for transportation or for irrigation. Sea navigation was aided by ports and lighthouses. A few advanced cities had aqueducts that serviced public fountains and baths, while fewer had sewers.

The earliest railways were used in mines or to bypass waterfalls, and were pulled by horses or by people. In 1811 John Blenkinsop designed the first successful and practical railway locomotive, and a line was built connecting the Middleton Colliery to Leeds.

The electrical telegraph was first successfully demonstrated on 25 July 1837 between Euston and Camden Town in London. It entered commercial use on the Great Western Railway over the 13 miles (21 km) from Paddington station to West Drayton on 9 April 1839. In 1876, Alexander Graham Bell achieved the first successful telephone transmission of clear speech. Soon, a bell was added for signaling, and then a switch-hook, and telephones took advantage of the exchange principle already employed in telegraph networks.

In 1863, the London Underground was created. In 1890, it first started using electric traction and deep-level tunnels. At the Paris Exposition of 1878, electric arc lighting had been installed along the Avenue de l'Opera and the Place de l'Opera. In 1924, Italy was the first country to build a freeway-like road, the Autostrada dei Laghi ("Lakes Motorway"; now parts of the Autostrada A8 and the Autostrada A9), which linked Milan to Lake Maggiore and Lake Como.

In 1982, the Internet Protocol Suite (TCP/IP) was standardized and the concept of a world-wide network of fully interconnected TCP/IP networks called the Internet was introduced.

== By time period ==
=== Before 1700 ===
Infrastructure before 1700 consisted mainly of roads and canals. Canals were used for transportation or for irrigation. Sea navigation was aided by ports and lighthouses. A few advanced cities had aqueducts that serviced public fountains and baths, while fewer had sewers.

Roads

The first roads were tracks that often followed game trails, such as the Natchez Trace.

The first paved streets appear to have been built in Ur in 4000 BCE. Corduroy roads were built in Glastonbury, England in 3300 BCE and brick-paved roads were built in the Indus Valley Civilisation on the Indian subcontinent from around the same time. In 500 BCE, Darius I the Great started an extensive road system in Persia (Iran), including the Royal Road.

With the rise of the Roman Empire, the Romans built roads using deep roadbeds of crushed stone as an underlying layer to ensure that they kept dry. On the more heavily travelled routes, there were additional layers that included six sided capstones, or pavers, that reduced the dust and reduced the drag from wheels.

In the medieval Islamic world, many roads were built throughout the Arab Empire. The most sophisticated roads were those of the Baghdad, Iraq, which were paved with tar in the 8th century.

Canals and irrigation systems

The oldest known canals were built in Mesopotamia c. 4000 BCE, in what is now Iraq and Syria. The Indus Valley Civilisation in India and Pakistan from c3300 BCE had a sophisticated canal irrigation system. In Egypt, canals date back to at least 2300 BCE, when a canal was built to bypass the cataract on the Nile near Aswan.

In ancient China, large canals for river transport were established as far back as the Warring States (481-221 BCE). By far the longest canal was the Grand Canal of China completed in 609 CE, still the longest canal in the world today at 1,794 kilometres (1,115 mi).

In Europe, canal building began in the Middle Ages because of commercial expansion from the 12th century. Notable canals were the Stecknitz Canal in Germany in 1398, the Briare Canal connecting the Loire and Seine in France in 1642, followed by the Canal du Midi in 1683 connecting the Atlantic to the Mediterranean. Canal building progressed steadily in Germany in the 17th and 18th centuries with three great rivers, the Elbe, Oder, and Weser being linked by canals.

=== 1700 to 1870 ===
Roads

As traffic levels increased in England and roads deteriorated, toll roads were built by Turnpike Trusts, especially between 1730 and 1770. Turnpikes were also later built in the United States. They were usually built by private companies under a government franchise.

Water transport on rivers and canals carried many farm goods from the US frontier between the Appalachian Mountains and Mississippi River in the early 19th century, but the shorter road route over the mountains had advantages.

In France, Pierre-Marie-Jérôme Trésaguet is widely credited with establishing the first scientific approach to road building about the year 1764. It involved a layer of large rocks, covered by a layer of smaller gravel. John Loudon McAdam (1756–1836) designed the first modern highways, and developed an inexpensive paving material of soil and stone aggregate known as macadam.

Canals

In Europe, particularly Britain and Ireland, and then in the early US and the Canadian colonies, inland canals preceded the development of railroads during the earliest phase of the Industrial Revolution. In Britain between 1760 and 1820 over one hundred canals were built.

In the United States, navigable canals reached into isolated areas and brought them in touch with the world beyond. By 1825 the Erie Canal, 363 miles (584 km) long with 82 locks, opened up a connection from the populated northeast to the fertile Great Plains. During the 19th century, the length of canals grew from 100 miles (160 km) to over 4,000 miles (6,400 km), with a complex network in conjunction with Canada making the Great Lakes navigable, although some canals were later drained and used as railroad rights-of-way.

Railways

The earliest railways were used in mines or to bypass waterfalls, and were pulled by horses or by people. In 1811 John Blenkinsop designed the first successful and practical railway locomotive, and a line was built connecting the Middleton Colliery to Leeds. The Liverpool and Manchester Railway, considered to be the world's first intercity line, opened in 1826. In the following years, railways spread throughout the United Kingdom and the world, and became the dominant means of land transport for nearly a century.

In the US, the 1826 Granite Railway in Massachusetts was the first commercial railroad to evolve through continuous operations into a common carrier. The Baltimore and Ohio, opened in 1830, was the first to evolve into a major system. In 1869, the symbolically important transcontinental railroad was completed in the US with the driving of a golden spike at Promontory, Utah.

Telegraph service

The electrical telegraph was first successfully demonstrated on 25 July 1837 between Euston and Camden Town in London. It entered commercial use on the Great Western Railway over the 13 miles (21 km) from Paddington station to West Drayton on 9 April 1839.

In the United States, the telegraph was developed by Samuel Morse and Alfred Vail. On 24 May 1844, Morse made the first public demonstration of his telegraph by sending a message from the Supreme Court Chamber in the US Capitol in Washington, DC to the B&O Railroad outer depot (now the B&O Railroad Museum) in Baltimore. The Morse/Vail telegraph was quickly deployed in the following two decades. On 24 October 1861, the first transcontinental telegraph system was established.

The first successful transatlantic telegraph cable was completed on 27 July 1866, allowing transatlantic telegraph communications for the first time. Within 29 years of its first installation at Euston Station, the telegraph network crossed the oceans to every continent but Antarctica, making instant global communication possible for the first time.

=== 1870 to 1920 ===
Roads

Tar-bound macadam, or tarmac, was applied to macadam roads towards the end of the 19th century in cities such as Paris. In the early 20th century tarmac and concrete paving were extended into the countryside.

Canals

Many notable sea canals were completed in this period, such as the Suez Canal in 1869, the Kiel Canal in 1897, and the Panama Canal in 1914.

Telephone service

In 1876, Alexander Graham Bell achieved the first successful telephone transmission of clear speech. The first telephones had no network, but were in private use, wired together in pairs. Users who wanted to talk to different people had as many telephones as necessary for the purpose. A user who wished to speak, whistled into the transmitter until the other party heard. Soon, however, a bell was added for signalling, and then a switch-hook, and telephones took advantage of the exchange principle already employed in telegraph networks. Each telephone was wired to a local telephone exchange, and the exchanges were wired together with trunks. Networks were connected together in a hierarchical manner until they spanned cities, countries, continents, and oceans.

Electricity

At the Paris Exposition of 1878, electric arc lighting had been installed along the Avenue de l'Opera and the Place de l'Opera, using electric Yablochkov arc lamps, powered by Zénobe Gramme alternating current dynamos.

Yablochkov candles required high voltages, and it was not long before experimenters reported that the arc lights could be powered on a seven-mile (11 km) circuit. Within a decade scores of cities would have lighting systems using a central power plant that provided electricity to multiple customers via electrical transmission lines. These systems were in direct competition with the dominant gaslight utilities of the period.

The first electricity system supplying incandescent lights was built by the Edison Illuminating Company in lower Manhattan, eventually serving one square mile with six "jumbo dynamos" housed at Pearl Street Station.

The first transmission of three-phase alternating current using high voltage took place in 1891 during the International Electro-Technical Exhibition in Frankfurt. A 25 kilovolt transmission line, approximately 175 km (109 mi) long, connected Lauffen on the Neckar with Frankfurt. Voltages used for electric power transmission increased throughout the 20th century. By 1914 fifty-five transmission systems operating at more than 70,000 V were in service, the highest voltage then being used was 150,000 V.

Water distribution and sewers

In the 19th century major treatment works were built in London in response to cholera threats. The Metropolis Water Act 1852 was enacted. "Under the Act, it became unlawful for any water company to extract water for domestic use from the tidal reaches of the Thames after 31 August 1855, and from 31 December 1855 all such water was required to be effectively filtered. The Metropolitan Commission of Sewers was formed, water filtration was made compulsory, and new water intakes on the Thames were established above Teddington Lock.

The technique of purification of drinking water by use of compressed liquefied chlorine gas was developed in 1910 by US Army Major Carl Rogers Darnall, Professor of Chemistry at the Army Medical School. Darnall's work became the basis for present day systems of municipal water purification.

Subways

In 1863 the London Underground was created. In 1890, it first started using electric traction and deep-level tunnels. Soon afterwards, Budapest and many other cities started using subway systems. By 1940, nineteen subway systems were in use.

=== Since 1920 ===
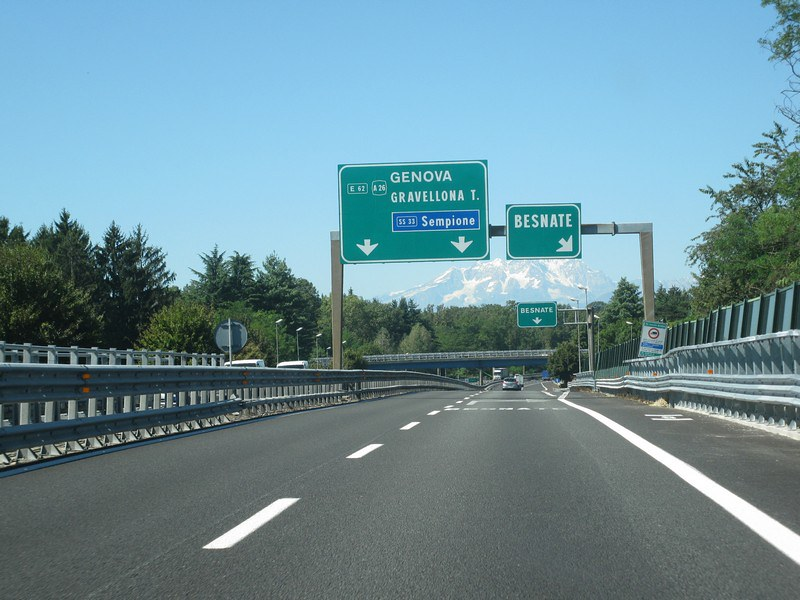
The Autostrada dei Laghi ("Lakes Motorway"; now parts of the Autostrada A8 and the Autostrada A9) near Besnate, in Italy, the first motorway built in the world.

Roads

Italy was the first country in the world to build motorways reserved for fast traffic and for motor vehicles only. The Autostrada dei Laghi ("Lakes Motorway"), the first built in the world, connecting Milan to Lake Como and Lake Maggiore, and now parts of the Autostrada A8 and Autostrada A9, was devised by Piero Puricelli and was inaugurated in 1924. Piero Puricelli, a civil engineer and entrepreneur, received the first authorization to build a public-utility fast road in 1921, and completed the construction (one lane in each direction) between 1924 and 1926. Piero Puricelli decided to cover the expenses by introducing a toll.

The Internet

Research into packet switching started in the early 1960s. The ARPANET in particular led to the development of protocols for internetworking, where multiple separate networks could be joined together into a network of networks The first two nodes of what would become the ARPANET were interconnected on 29 October 1969. Access to the ARPANET was expanded in 1981 when the National Science Foundation (NSF) developed the Computer Science Network (CSNET). In 1982, the Internet Protocol Suite (TCP/IP) was standardised and the concept of a world-wide network of fully interconnected TCP/IP networks called the Internet was introduced. TCP/IP network access expanded again in 1986 when the National Science Foundation Network (NSFNET) provided access to supercomputer sites in the United States from research and education organisations. Commercial internet service providers (ISPs) began to emerge in the late 1980s and early 1990s. The ARPANET was decommissioned in 1990. The Internet was commercialised in 1995 when NSFNET was decommissioned, removing the last restrictions on the use of the Internet to carry commercial traffic. The Internet started a rapid expansion to Europe and Australia in the mid to late 1980s and to Asia in the late 1980s and early 1990s. During the late 1990s, it was estimated that traffic on the public Internet grew by 100 per cent per year, while the mean annual growth in the number of Internet users was thought to be between 20% and 50%. As of 31 March 2011, the estimated total number of Internet users was 2.095 billion (30.2% of world population).

== Bibliography ==
- Larry W. Beeferman, "Pension Fund Investment in Infrastructure: A Resource Paper", Capital Matter (Occasional Paper Series), No.3 December 2008
- A. Eberhard, "Infrastructure Regulation in Developing Countries", PPIAF Working Paper No. 4 (2007) World Bank
- M. Nicolas J. Firzli & Vincent Bazi, “Infrastructure Investments in an Age of Austerity : The Pension and Sovereign Funds Perspective”, published jointly in Revue Analyse Financière, Q4 2011 issue, pp. 34– 37 and USAK/JTW July 30, 2011 (online edition)
- Georg Inderst, "Pension Fund Investment in Infrastructure", OECD Working Papers on Insurance and Private Pensions, No. 32 (2009)
- Ascher, Kate; researched by Wendy Marech (2007). The works: anatomy of a city (Reprint. ed.). New York: Penguin Press. ISBN 978-0143112709.
- Hayes, Brian (2005). Infrastructure: the book of everything for the industrial landscape (1st ed.). New York City: Norton. ISBN 978-0393329599.
- Huler, Scott (2010). On the grid: a plot of land, an average neighborhood, and the systems that make our world work. Emmaus, Penn.: Rodale. ISBN 978-1-60529-647-0.
- Hadfield, Charles (1986), World Canals: Inland Navigation Past and Present, David and Charles, ISBN 978-0-7153-8555-5
- Needham, J. (1971), Science and Civilisation in China, C.U.P. Cambridge
- Rodda, J.C. (2004), The Basis of Civilization - Water Science?, International Association of Hydrological Sciences
