= Autostrada A9 (Italy) =

Controlled-access highway in Italy

Autostrada A9
- Autostrada dei Laghi (Lakes Motorway)

Route information
- Part of E35
- Maintained by ANAS
- Length: 31.5 km (19.6 mi)
- Existed: 21 September 1924 (Note: While the A9 branch to Como opened slightly later, the overall "Autostrada dei Laghi" project, including the first Milan-Varese section (now A8), was inaugurated on this date.)–present

Major junctions
- South end: Lainate (A8)
- A8 in Lainate; A36 in Turate; A59 in Grandate (Como)
- North end: Chiasso, Switzerland (Swiss A2)

Location
- Country: Italy
- Regions: Lombardy

Highway system
- Roads in Italy; Autostrade; State; Regional; Provincial; Municipal
← A 8	→ A 10

The Autostrada A9 is an Italian motorway approximately 31.5 kilometres (19.6 mi) long, located entirely within the Lombardy region of northern Italy. It connects the A8 motorway at Lainate, near Milan, to Como and the Swiss border at Chiasso, where it joins the Swiss A2 motorway. The route is part of the European route E35.

Together with the A8 motorway (which connects Milan to Varese), the A9 forms part of the Autostrada dei Laghi ("Lakes Motorway"). This network, whose first section (Milan–Varese) was inaugurated on 21 September 1924, was the world's first purpose-built motorway reserved for motor vehicles.

== History ==
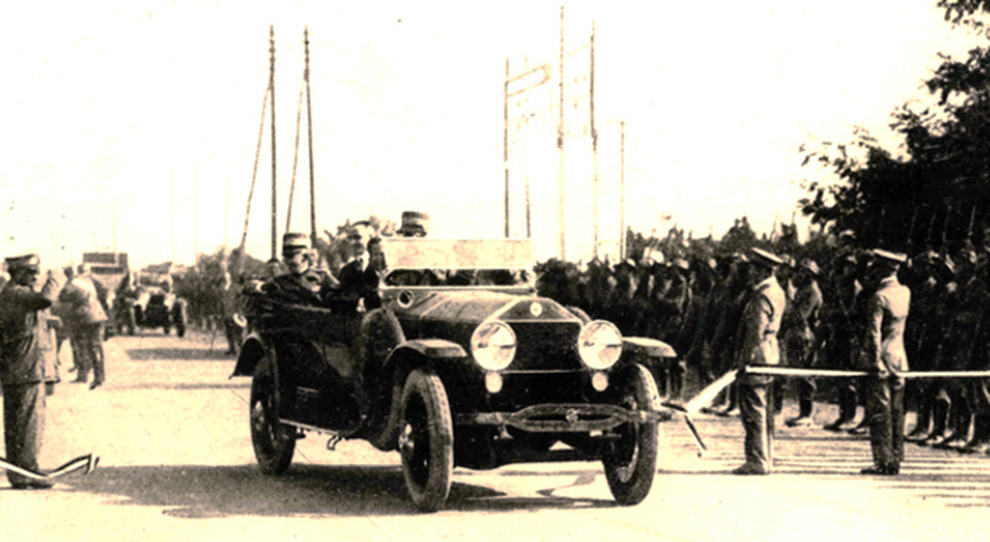
King Victor Emmanuel III of Italy inaugurates the Autostrada dei Laghi ("Lakes Motorway"; now parts of A8 and A9), the world's first motorway, on 21 September 1924, aboard a Lancia Trikappa.

Historical map (1926) of the Autostrada dei Laghi system.

The concept of reserved motorways originated in Italy. Engineer Piero Puricelli presented his project for the Autostrada dei Laghi in 1921, receiving the first governmental authorization to build a public-utility fast road. In a 1922 official document, he coined the term autostrada to describe roads designed for fast traffic, reserved solely for motor vehicles (autoveicoli).

Construction took place between 1923 and 1924. The first section, from Milan to Varese (now part of the A8), was inaugurated on 21 September 1924, making Italy the first country with such a road. The branch leading from Lainate towards Como (the current A9) was completed shortly after. Puricelli financed the project by introducing tolls.

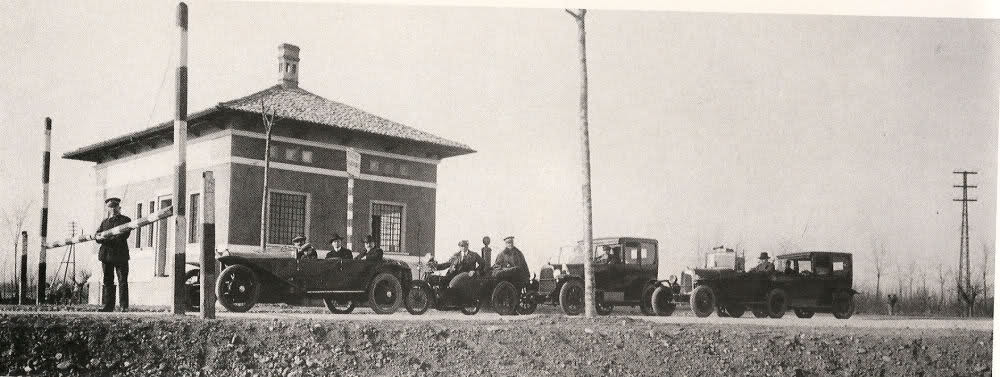
The original toll gate of the Autostrada dei Laghi in Milan, 1924.

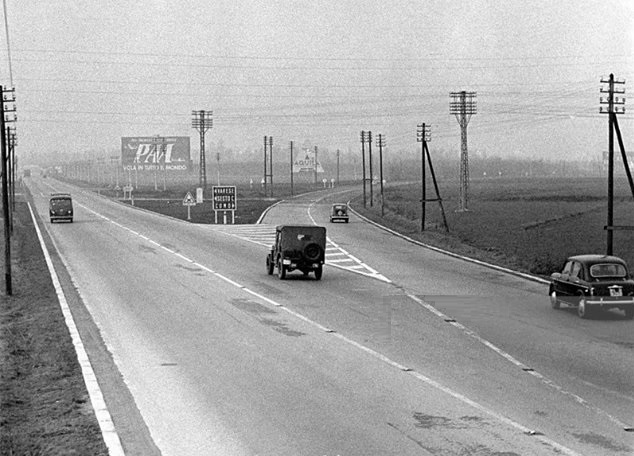
Autostrada dei Laghi in the 1950s, before conversion to dual carriageway.

The project was considered futuristic at the time, as Italy had relatively few motor vehicles – approximately 84,000 in 1924, rising to around 173,000 by 1929.

Originally built as a single-carriageway road, the Autostrada dei Laghi network, including the A9, was progressively upgraded to dual carriageways between the late 1950s and mid-1960s to handle increasing traffic volumes.

== Route ==
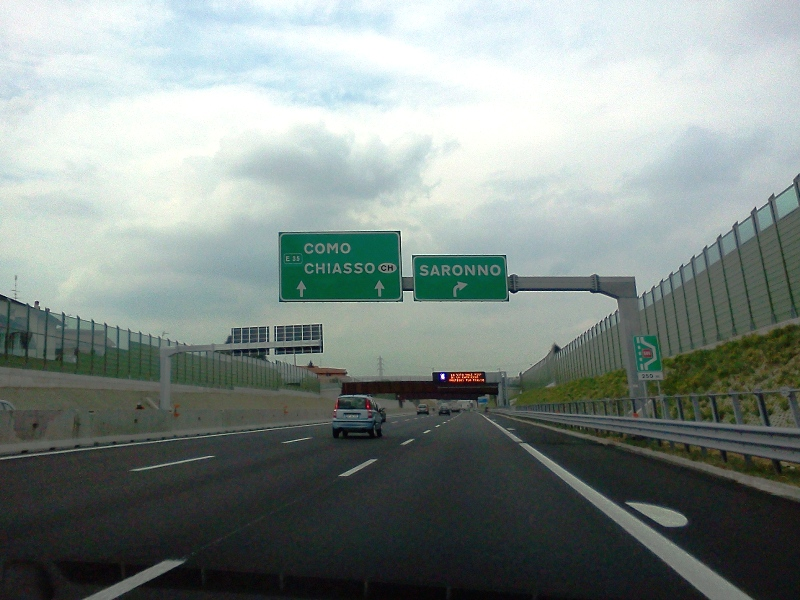
Autostrada A9 near Saronno.

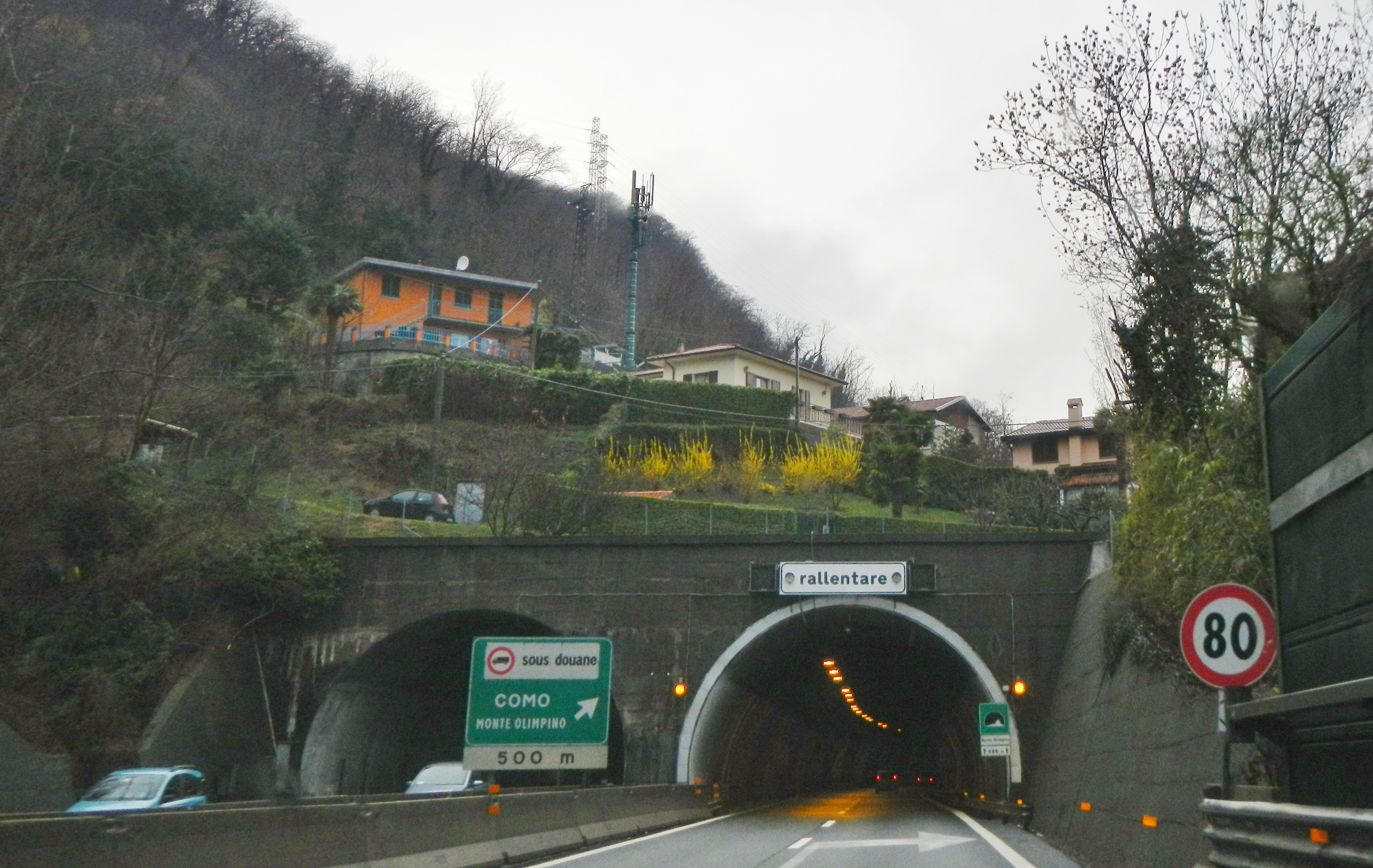
Autostrada A9 Monte Olimpino tunnel entrance near Como.

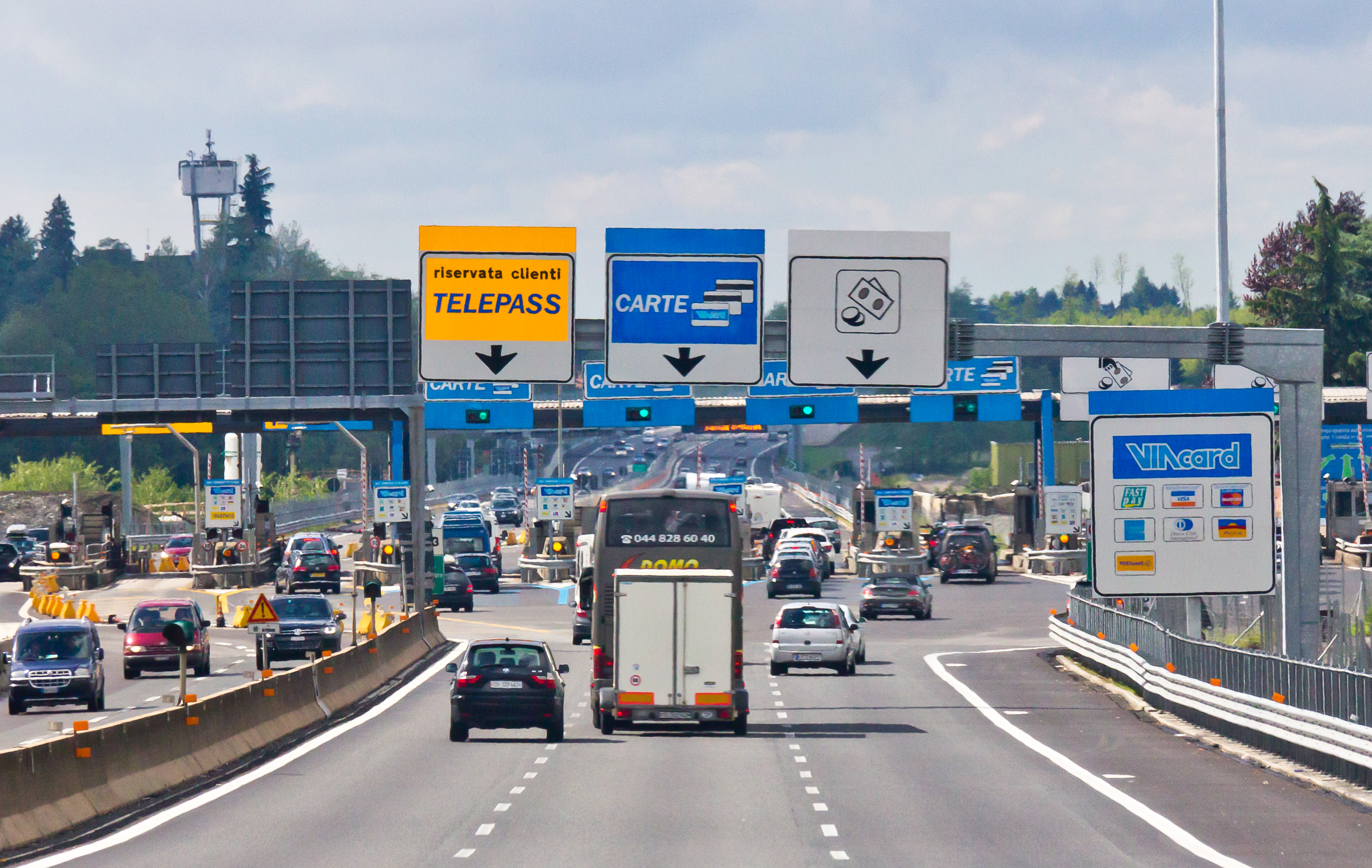
Como Grandate toll plaza.

The A9 originates from the A8 motorway near Lainate, northwest of Milan. It proceeds northwards, passing west of Saronno and connecting with the A36 Pedemontana Lombarda motorway near Turate. The route continues past Lomazzo and Fino Mornasco before reaching the Como area. It intersects with the A59 Tangenziale di Como (Como bypass) near Grandate. The main toll plaza (barriera) is located at Como Grandate. The motorway then proceeds through tunnels past Como city before reaching the Swiss border and customs area at Brogeda, connecting directly to the Swiss A2 motorway towards Lugano and the Gotthard Pass. The entire route is part of European route E35.

LAINATE – COMO – CHIASSO; Autostrada dei Laghi
Exit / Junction	↓km↓	↑km↑	Province	European route
Milano - Varese	0.0 km (0 mi)	31.5 km (19.6 mi)	MI	E35
Origgio	3.7 km (2.3 mi)	27.8 km (17.3 mi)	VA	E35
Uboldo	4.7 km (2.9 mi)	26.8 km (16.7 mi)	VA	E35
Saronno	5.4 km (3.4 mi)	26.1 km (16.2 mi)	VA	E35
Turate	8.7 km (5.4 mi)	22.8 km (14.2 mi)	CO	E35
Autostrada Pedemontana Lombarda	11.7 km (7.3 mi)	19.8 km (12.3 mi)	CO	E35
Lomazzo Sud	13.4 km (8.3 mi)	18.1 km (11.2 mi)	CO	E35
Lomazzo Nord	15.1 km (9.4 mi)	16.4 km (10.2 mi)	CO	E35
Rest area "Lario"	17.3 km (10.7 mi)	14.2 km (8.8 mi)	CO	E35
Fino Mornasco	19.5 km (12.1 mi)	12.0 km (7.5 mi)	CO	E35
A59 Tangenziale di Como (Villa Guardia – Como Est)	22.6 km (14.0 mi)	8.9 km (5.5 mi)	CO	E35
Toll gate Como Grandate	22.7 km (14.1 mi)	8.8 km (5.5 mi)	CO	E35
Como Centro	23.5 km (14.6 mi)	9.0 km (5.6 mi)	CO	E35
Como Monte Olimpino	29.1 km (18.1 mi)	3.4 km (2.1 mi)	CO	E35
Lake Como	30.8 km (19.1 mi)	0.7 km (0.43 mi)	CO	E35
Como Brogeda Customs; Rest area "Brogeda"; Italy–Switzerland border Swiss A2 Motorway; Chiasso - Lugano - Gotthard - San Bernardino	31.5 km (19.6 mi)	0.0 km (0 mi)	CO	E35

== See also ==
- Autostrade of Italy
- History of controlled-access highways
- Transport in Italy

=== Other Italian road types ===
- State highways (Italy) (Strade Statali)
- Regional road (Italy) (Strade Regionali)
- Provincial road (Italy) (Strade Provinciali)
- Municipal road (Italy) (Strade Comunali)
