= Autostrada A8 (Italy) =

Controlled-access highway in Italy

Autostrada A8
- Autostrada dei Laghi; Lakes motorway

Route information
- Part of E35 and E62
- Maintained by ANAS
- Length: 43.6 km (27.1 mi)
- Existed: 1924–present

Major junctions
- From: Milan
- A4 in Milan; A50 in Milan; A52 in Milan; A9 in Lainate; A26 in Gallarate; A60 in Varese
- To: Varese

Location
- Country: Italy
- Regions: Lombardy

Highway system
- Roads in Italy; Autostrade; State; Regional; Provincial; Municipal
← A 7	→ A 9

The Autostrada A8 or Autostrada dei Laghi ('Lakes motorway') is an autostrada (Italian for 'motorway') 43.6 kilometres (27.1 mi) long in Italy located in the region of Lombardy connecting Milan to Varese (on the Lake of Varese) and connecting Milan to Gallarate and Sesto Calende on Lake Maggiore and on Lake Monate (now part of the Gallarate - Gattico connection, also part of the Autostrada dei Laghi). It is a part of the E35 and E62 European routes.

Autostrada A8 is commonly defined, together with the Autostrada A9, as the "Autostrada dei Laghi". The Autostrada A9 connects to the Autostrada A8 at Lainate, near Milan, and it reaches Como, on the Lake Como, and Chiasso, on the Italy–Switzerland border, where it connects to the Swiss road network. Built in 1924, Autostrada dei Laghi is the first motorway built in the world.

On 26 September 2023, the 5th lane in each direction in the Milan-Lainate section was opened to traffic, thus making the A8 the first motorway in Italy with 5 lanes in each direction.

== History ==
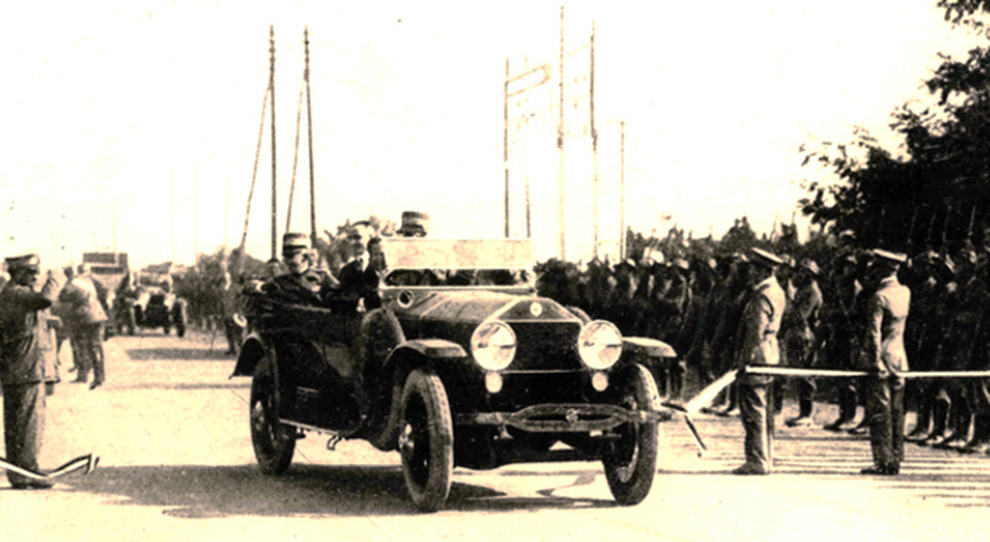
The King Victor Emmanuel III of Italy inaugurated the Autostrada dei Laghi ('Lakes Motorway'; now parts of the Autostrada A8 and Autostrada A9), the first motorway built in the world, on 21 September 1924, aboard the royal Lancia Trikappa

Historical map of 1926 of the Autostrada dei Laghi

The term autostrada was used for the first time in an official document in 1922 in which the engineer Piero Puricelli presented the project for the Autostrada dei Laghi ('Lakes Motorway'); with that term, it indicated those roads characterized by a straight path (as far as possible), without obstacles, characterized by a high achievable speed, passable only by motor vehicles (Italian: autoveicoli, hence the name) aimed at the rapid transport of goods and people.

Italy was the first country in the world to build motorways reserved for fast traffic and for motor vehicles only. The Autostrada dei Laghi ('Lakes Motorway'), the first built in the world, connecting Milan to Lake Como and Lake Maggiore, and now parts of the Autostrada A8 and Autostrada A9, was devised by Piero Puricelli and was inaugurated in 1924. Piero Puricelli, a civil engineer and entrepreneur, received the first authorization to build a public-utility fast road in 1921, and completed the construction (one lane in each direction) between 1924 and 1926. Piero Puricelli decided to cover the expenses by introducing a toll.

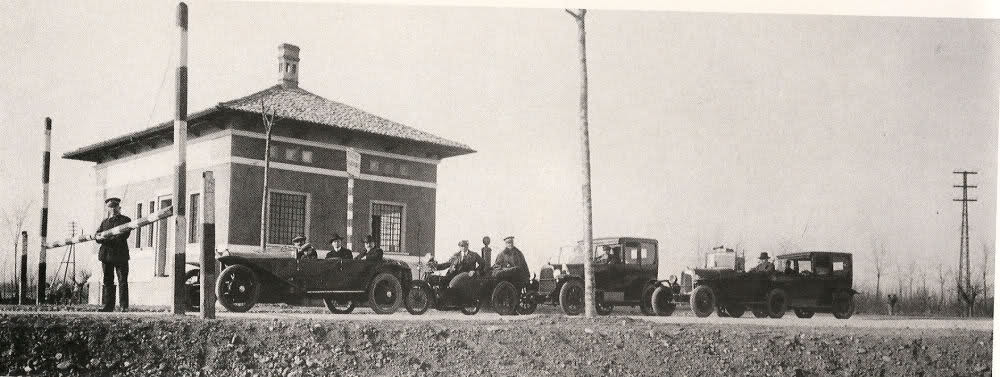
Toll gate of the Autostrada dei Laghi in Milan in 1924

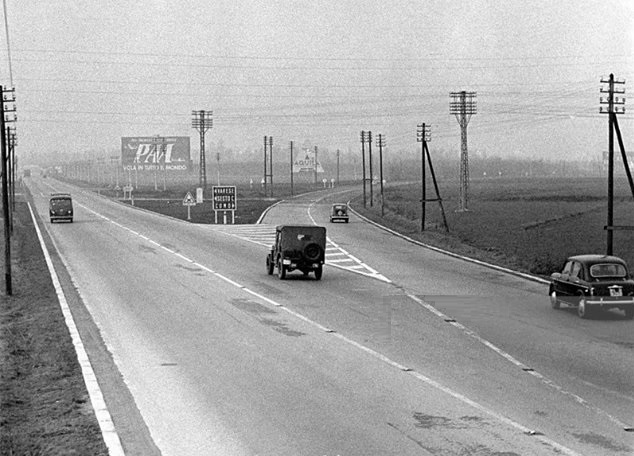
Autostrada dei Laghi in the 1950s

It was a futuristic project because there were few cars in circulation in Italy at that time. In 1923 there were a total of 53,000 cars circulating on Italian roads (between 1928 and 1929 there was a significant increase, as they went from 142,000 cars in circulation to 173,000 respectively). In 1927 there were 135,900 cars circulating in Italy, corresponding to one vehicle for every 230 inhabitants, while today the ratio is 1 car for every 1.6 inhabitants. The most motorized Italian regions were those of northern Italy and central Italy, with Lombardy at the top of the list with over 38,700 cars in 1923, while at the bottom of the list was Basilicata with 502 cars. Milan was the Italian city in which the most car licences were issued annually (12,000 in 1928), while the Italian region where the fewest licences were issued was Sardinia, with only 632 new licences.

Originally, the motorway was just a single carriageway, it would not be upgraded to a dual carriageway before mid-1960s.

== Route ==
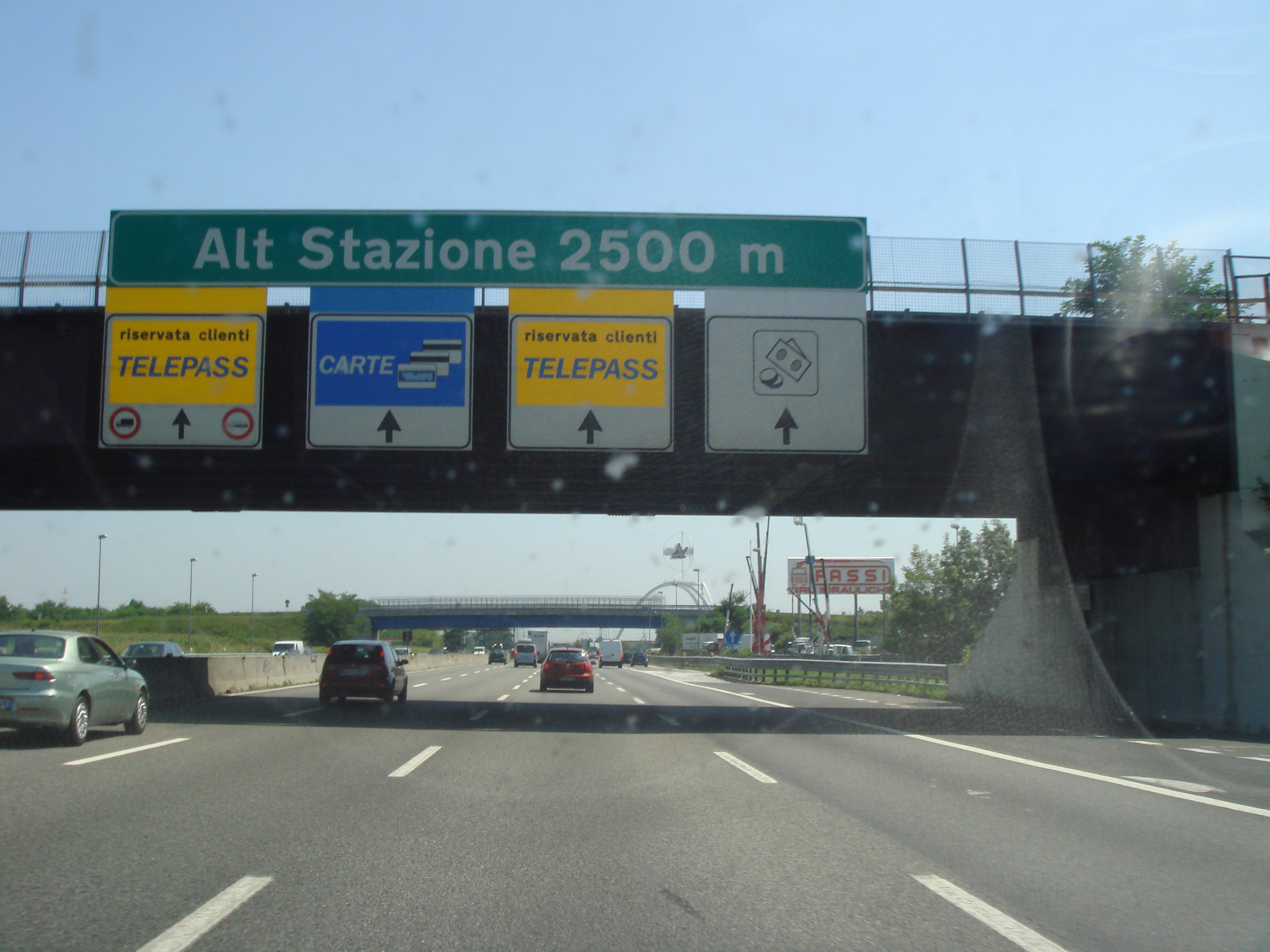
Autostrada A8 near Milan

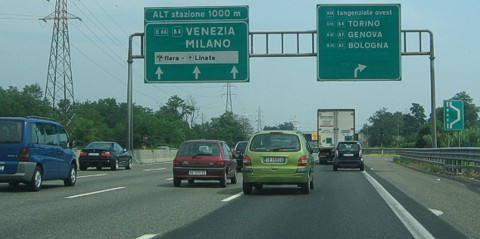
Autostrada A8 near Rho

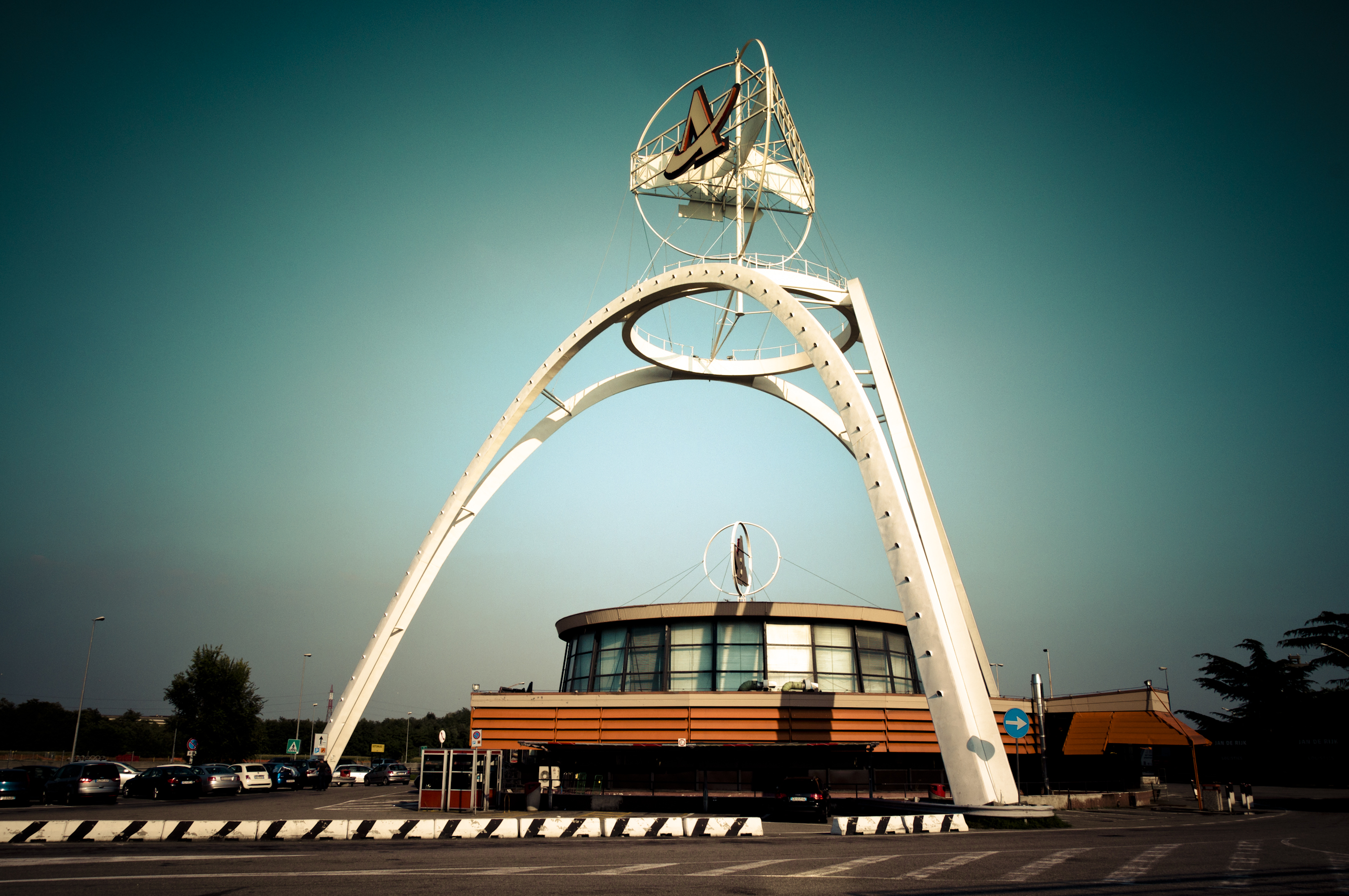
Rest area "Villoresi Ovest"

MILAN – VARESE; Autostrada dei Laghi
Exit	↓km↓	↑km↑	Province	European route
Milan Viale Certosa; Cavalcavia del Ghisallo - San Siro Stadium	−1.0 km (−0.62 mi)	43.6 km (27.1 mi)	MI	
E64 Turin - Venice	−0.9 km (−0.56 mi)	43.5 km (27.0 mi)	MI	
Cascina Merlata; Raccordo per A4 Torino e A50	0.5 km (0.31 mi)	42.1 km (26.2 mi)	MI	
Fieramilano; Tangenziale Nord di Milano	2.0 km (1.2 mi)	40.6 km (25.2 mi)	MI	
Toll gate Milan Nord	5.6 km (3.5 mi)	38.0 km (23.6 mi)	MI	
Tangenziale Ovest di Milano	6.8 km (4.2 mi)	36.8 km (22.9 mi)	MI	E35; E62
Lainate-Arese	7.2 km (4.5 mi)	36.4 km (22.6 mi)	MI	E35; E62
Rest area "Villoresi Ovest"	7.6 km (4.7 mi)	35.0 km (21.7 mi)	MI	E35; E62
Lainate	8.1 km (5.0 mi)	34.5 km (21.4 mi)	MI	E35; E62
Como - Chiasso	10.3 km (6.4 mi)	32.3 km (20.1 mi)	MI	E35; E62
Origgio ovest	14.0 km (8.7 mi)	28.4 km (17.6 mi)	VA	E62
Legnano	16.3 km (10.1 mi)	26.3 km (16.3 mi)	MI	E62
Castellanza	18.0 km (11.2 mi)	24.6 km (15.3 mi)	VA	E62
Busto Arsizio; Strada statale 336 dell'Aeroporto della Malpensa; Milan Malpensa Airport	24.5 km (15.2 mi)	18.2 km (11.3 mi)	VA	E62
Lentate sul Seveso	26.0 km (16.2 mi)	15.0 km (9.3 mi)	VA	E62
Gallarate	29.9 km (18.6 mi)	12.7 km (7.9 mi)	VA	E62
Diramazione Gallarate-Gattico	30.9 km (19.2 mi)	11.7 km (7.3 mi)	VA	E62
Toll gate Gallarate Nord	31.9 km (19.8 mi)	11.7 km (7.3 mi)	VA	
Cavaria	33.9 km (21.1 mi)	8.7 km (5.4 mi)	VA	
Solbiate Arno	35.7 km (22.2 mi)	6.9 km (4.3 mi)	VA	
Castronno	40.1 km (24.9 mi)	2.5 km (1.6 mi)	VA	
Rest area "Brughiera"	40.7 km (25.3 mi)	1.9 km (1.2 mi)	VA	
Tangenziale di Varese; Gazzada Schianno; Morazzone; Varese est	41.7 km (25.9 mi)	0.9 km (0.56 mi)	VA	
Azzate - Buguggiate Varese ovest del Chiostro di Voltorre: Lake Varese	42.0 km (26.1 mi)	0.6 km (0.37 mi)	VA	
Raccordo Gazzada-Varese	42.6 km (26.5 mi)	0.0 km (0 mi)	VA	

=== A8/A26 Gallarate-Gattico connection ===
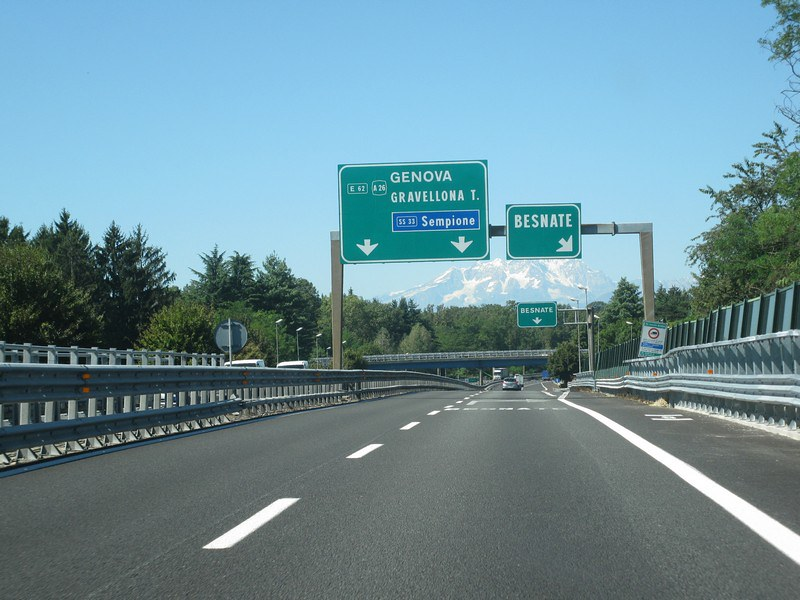
A8/A26 Gallarate-Gattico connection near Besnate

AUTOSTRADA A8/A26; Gallarate - Gattico connection
Exit	↓km↓	↑km↑	Province	European route
Milan - Varese	0.0 km (0 mi)	24.0 km (14.9 mi)	VA	E62
Toll gate Gallarate Ovest	2.5 km (1.6 mi)	21.5 km (13.4 mi)	VA	E62
Besnate	4.0 km (2.5 mi)	20.0 km (12.4 mi)	VA	E62
Rest area "Verbano"	6.1 km (3.8 mi)	17.9 km (11.1 mi)	VA	E62
Sesto Calende - Vergiate del Sempione: Lake Maggiore del Lago di Monate: Lake Monate	11.9 km (7.4 mi)	12.1 km (7.5 mi)	VA	E62
Castelletto Ticino; Ticinese del Sempione: Lake Maggiore	17.9 km (11.1 mi)	6.1 km (3.8 mi)	NO	E62
Gravellona Toce - Genoa	24.0 km (14.9 mi)	0.0 km (0 mi)	NO	E62

== See also ==
Media related to Autostrada A8 (Italy) at Wikimedia Commons

- Autostrade of Italy
- History of controlled-access highways
- Roads in Italy
- Transport in Italy

=== Other Italian roads ===
- State highways (Italy)
- Regional road (Italy)
- Provincial road (Italy)
- Municipal road (Italy)
