= Autostrada A36 =

Controlled-access highway in Italy

Autostrada A36
- Pedemontana Lombarda; Lombard foothills motorway

Route information
- Maintained by ANAS
- Length: 22 km (14 mi)
- Existed: 2015–present

Major junctions
- West end: Cassano Magnago
- A8 in Cassano Magnago; A9 in Cislago
- East end: Lentate sul Seveso

Location
- Country: Italy
- Regions: Lombardy

Highway system
- Roads in Italy; Autostrade; State; Regional; Provincial; Municipal
← A 35	→ A 50

Autostrada A36, also called Pedemontana Lombarda ("Lombard foothills motorway"), is an autostrada (Italian for "motorway") 22 kilometres (14 mi) long in Italy located in the region of Lombardy that aims to speed up travel in the north of Milan, creating a road outside the Metropolitan City of Milan to connect the province of Varese with that of Bergamo, as well as the Milan Malpensa Airport with the Orio al Serio International Airport.

The section between the link with the Autostrada A8 at Cassano Magnago and the strada statale 35 dei Giovi at Lentate sul Seveso was opened between January and November 2015.

== Route ==
AUTOSTRADA A36; Pedemontana Lombarda
Exit	↓km↓	↑km↑	Province	European Route
Milano - Varese	0.0 km (0 mi)	22.0 km (13.7 mi)	VA	--
Solbiate Olona	1.0 km (0.62 mi)	21.0 km (13.0 mi)	VA	--
Mozzate-Cislago	8.0 km (5.0 mi)	14.0 km (8.7 mi)	CO	--
Rest area (in project)	-	-	CO	--
Cislago (Note: Exit only east carriageway, entrance only west carriageway.)	11.0 km (6.8 mi)	11.0 km (6.8 mi)	CO	--
Milano - Como; Lomazzo	15.0 km (9.3 mi)	7.0 km (4.3 mi)	CO	--
Bregnano-Lazzate	19.0 km (11.8 mi)	3.0 km (1.9 mi)	MB	--
Lentate sul Seveso	21.0 km (13.0 mi)	1.0 km (0.62 mi)	MB	--
Milano - Meda	22.0 km (13.7 mi)	0.0 km (0 mi)	MB	--

== See also ==
- Autostrade of Italy
- Roads in Italy
- Transport in Italy

=== Other Italian roads ===
- State highways (Italy)
- Regional road (Italy)
- Provincial road (Italy)
- Municipal road (Italy)
