= Piero Puricelli =

Italian engineer and politician (1883–1951)

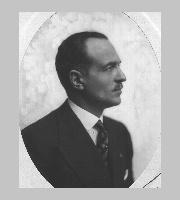
- Born: 4 April 1883; Milan, Lombardy; Italy
- Died: 8 May 1951 (aged 68); Milan, Lombardy; Italy
- Occupations: Engineer politician
- Years active: 1905–1945

Piero Puricelli (born 4 April 1883 in Milan - died 8 May 1951 in Milan), Count of Lomnago, was an Italian engineer and politician in the first half of the 20th century who was responsible for the ideation, in Italy, of the first motorways in the world. He became a senator of Italy in 1929.

== Family life ==
Piero Puricelli, Count of Lomnago, was born the son of Angelo and Carlotta Combi. He attended the Federal Polytechnic Institute in Zurich, from which he graduated in engineering in 1905. Puricelli married Antonietta Tosi; they had one son, Franco.

== The first motorway in the world ==
In the period following the First World War, after economic development recommenced in Italy, a project to build a motorway was conceived - that is "... a new road reserved exclusively for motor traffic ... ". In 1922 Puricelli designed the project, connecting Milan to Lake Como and Lake Maggiore. On 20 September 1923, King Vittorio Emanuele III inaugurated the first section of the motorway, to Gallarate. For its time, this was a futuristic work: the cart and the bicycle were still the dominant means of personal transport in Italy at the time, and there were no more than 85,000 motor vehicles in Italy in 1924, half in Lombardy.

Historical map of 1926 of the Autostrada dei Laghi ("Lakes Motorway"; now parts of the Autostrada A8 and the Autostrada A9).

On 21 September 1924, the extension to Varese was inaugurated. The Autostrada dei Laghi ("Lakes Motorway") was the first exclusive-use motorway built in the world reserved for fast traffic and for motor vehicles only because the high-speed AVUS road in Berlin was also used as a race and test track for motor vehicles.

== The Monza Racetrack ==
Monza track, 1922

The Autodromo Nazionale di Monza (Monza National Racetrack) project was assigned to Arturo Mercanti, then director of the Automobile Club of Milan, and the engineers Alfredo Rosselli and Piero Puricelli. The overall length was 10 kilometres (6.2 mi), comprising a 4.5 kilometres (2.80 mi) loop track, and a 5.5 kilometres (3.42 mi) road track.

The Automobile Club commissioned the construction of the racetrack in January 1922 to commemorate its twenty-fifth anniversary. Work began on 15 May and was completed in just 110 days. Pietro Bordino and Felice Nazzaro completed the first lap of the track on 28 July in a Fiat 570. The national racetrack was the third permanent circuit in the world, preceded only by the Indianapolis Motor Speedway in the United States and by the English one at Brooklands, no longer in existence today.

The choice of Monza was the result of studies seeking a location near Milan, to limit the "travel" costs for the maintenance of the racetrack. Setting aside alternative sites near Gallarate and Gagnola (a peripheral location in Milan), the directors of the ACI chose the park at the Villa Reale in Monza.

== Political career ==
Puricelli was appointed Senator on 26 February 1929, proposed by the Italian National Fascist Party and remained in office until his removal by the Alta Corte di Giustizia per le Sanzioni contro il Fascismo (High Court of Justice for Sanctions against Fascism) in 1945, for having been one of the "senators held responsible for maintaining fascism and making war possible, both by their votes and by their individual actions, including the propaganda exercised outside and inside the Senate". In July 1946 he was acquitted of the charge of collaboration.

== Appointments ==
Among the appointments Piero Puricelli held are:

- Vice-president of the Bureau International des Expositions
- 1929 President of the public companies La strada and Autostrade
- 1931 President of the International Union of Trade Shows

== Italian honours ==
- Laurea honoris causa in ingegneria dal Politecnico di Milano - nastrino per uniforme ordinaria (Honorary degree in engineering from the Polytechnic University of Milan) - 1927
