= Pierre-Marie-Jérôme Trésaguet =

French engineer (1716-1796)

- Born: 15 January 1716; Nevers, Nièvre, France
- Died: 1796 (aged about 80)
- Known for: Establishing the first scientific approach to road building
- Scientific career
- Fields: Engineering, road building
- Institutions: Corps des Ponts et Chaussées, Paris; chief engineer, Limoges

Pierre-Marie-Jérôme Trésaguet (15 January 1716 – 1796) was a French engineer. He is widely credited with establishing the first scientific approach to road building about the year 1764. Among his innovations was the use of a base layer of large stone covered with a thin layer of smaller stone. The advantage of this two-layer configuration was that when rammed or rolled by traffic the stones jammed into one another forming a strong wear resistant surface which offered less obstruction to traffic.

Trésaguet was born in Nevers, the youngest son from a family of engineers. He began his career as a sub inspector in the Corps des Ponts et Chaussées (Bridges and Highways Corps), in Paris. He later moved to Limoges, Haute-Vienne as chief engineer in 1764. In 1775 he was appointed inspector general of roads and bridges for all of France. He published a paper describing his road building methods.

== Method of road building ==
First of all, an earth foundation was excavated parallel with but about ten inches below the finished surface of the new road. This was convex in cross section to encourage water to drain off the finished surface.

Next, large stones were laid on edge and any protruding pieces on their upper edges broken off to leave an even surface. This stone foundation was covered with a second course of smaller rounded stones.

Finally, a third layer of hard broken stone (about the size of walnuts) was spread by a shovel to produce the surface layer.

This system was used continuously in France from 1775 until 1820 when the country changed to the cheaper Macadam method.

== See also ==
- Hubert Gautier
- Thomas Telford
- John Loudon McAdam

== Bibliography ==
- Arthur G. Bruce, Highway Design and Construction, International Textbook Company, Scranton, Pennsylvania (1934)
