= Origgio =

- Comune
- Comune di Origgio
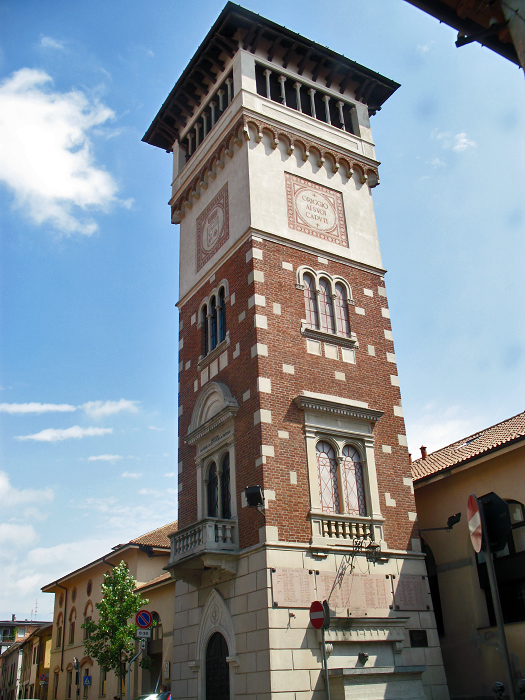

- Location within Italy Location within Lombardy
- Coordinates: 45°36′N 9°1′E
- Country: Italy
- Region: Lombardy
- Province: Province of Varese (VA)
- Frazioni: Cascina Muschiona, Cascina Broggio

Area
  - Total: 8.1 km^{2} (3.1 sq mi)
- Elevation: 191 m (627 ft)

Population (Dec. 2004)
  - Total: 6,777
  - Density: 840/km^{2} (2,200/sq mi)
- Demonym: Origgesi
- Time zone: UTC+1 (CET)
  - Summer (DST): UTC+2 (CEST)
- Postal code: 21040
- Dialing code: 02
- Website: Official website

Origgio (Lombard: Origg [uˈritʃ]) is a comune (municipality) in the Province of Varese in the Italian region Lombardy, located about 20 kilometres (12 mi) northwest of Milan and about 30 kilometres (19 mi) southeast of Varese. As of 31 December 2004, it had a population of 6,777 and an area of 8.1 square kilometres (3.1 mi^{2}).

The municipality of Origgio contains the frazioni (subdivisions, mainly villages and hamlets) Cascina Muschiona and Cascina Broggio.

Origgio borders the following municipalities: Caronno Pertusella, Cerro Maggiore, Lainate, Nerviano, Saronno, Uboldo.

== Demographic evolution ==
Historical population

Year	Pop.	±%
1861	1,805	—
1871	1,900	+5.3%
1881	1,789	−5.8%
1901	1,963	+9.7%
1911	2,200	+12.1%

Year	Pop.	±%
1921	2,462	+11.9%
1931	2,957	+20.1%
1936	3,144	+6.3%
1951	3,972	+26.3%
1961	4,454	+12.1%

Year	Pop.	±%
1971	5,127	+15.1%
1981	5,785	+12.8%
1991	5,882	+1.7%
2001	6,379	+8.4%

Source: Data from ISTAT
