= Lainate =

Lainate Lainaa (Lombard)
- Comune
- Comune di Lainate
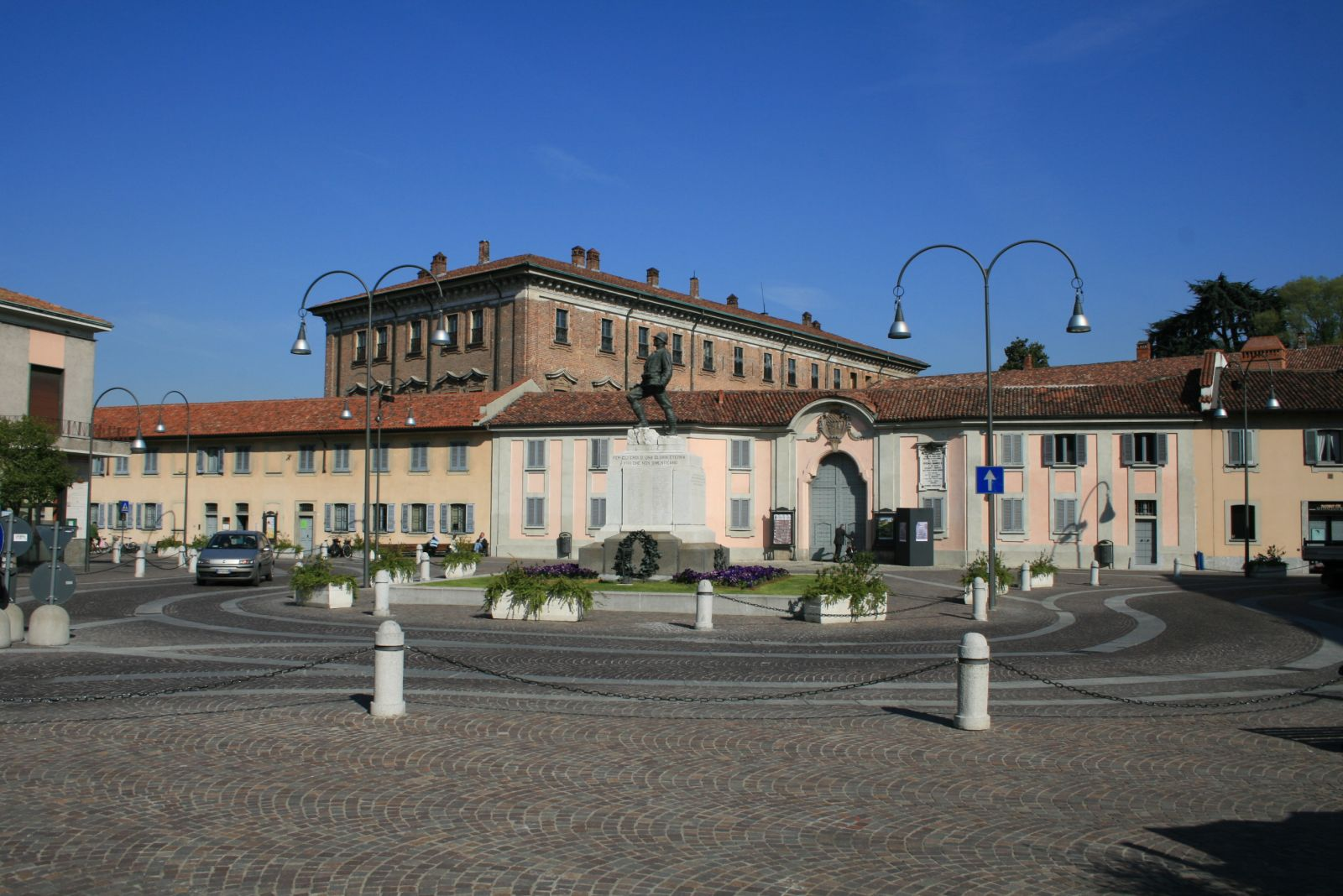
- Villa Litta.

- Location within Italy Location within Lombardy
- Coordinates: 45°34′N 9°2′E
- Country: Italy
- Region: Lombardy
- Metropolitan city: Milan (MI)
- Frazioni: Barbaiana, Grancia, Pagliera

Government
  - Mayor: Andrea Tagliaferro

Area
  - Total: 12.9 km^{2} (5.0 sq mi)
- Elevation: 176 m (577 ft)

Population (30 November 2014)
  - Total: 25,678
  - Density: 1,990/km^{2} (5,160/sq mi)
- Demonym: Lainatesi
- Time zone: UTC+1 (CET)
  - Summer (DST): UTC+2 (CEST)
- Postal code: 20020
- Dialing code: 02
- Website: Official website

Lainate (Lombard: Lainaa [lai̯ˈnaː]) is a comune (municipality) in the Metropolitan City of Milan in the Italian region Lombardy, located about 15 kilometres (9 mi) northwest of Milan.

Lainate borders the following municipalities: Caronno Pertusella, Origgio, Garbagnate Milanese, Nerviano, Arese, Rho, Pogliano Milanese.

Lainate is home to Villa Visconti Borromeo Arese Litta, a Medici-inspired 1500s villa that today attracts many tourists because of its nymphaeum, and the headquarters of the confectionery company Perfetti Van Melle which sells candies and gums all over the world.

It is also popular for the Villoresi Canal and its forest, where many people walk or run.
