= Lancia Trikappa =

- Lancia Trikappa coupé de ville

Overview
- Manufacturer: Lancia
- Production: 1922–1925

Body and chassis
- Class: Luxury car
- Body style: Torpedo; Coupé de ville
- Layout: Front-engine, rear-wheel-drive

Powertrain
- Engine: 4,594 cc V8
- Transmission: 4-speed manual

Dimensions
- Wheelbase: 3,384 mm (133.2 in)
- Curb weight: 1,360 kg (2,998 lb) (chassis)

Chronology
- Successor: Lancia Dilambda

The Lancia Trikappa is an automobile produced by Lancia between 1922 and 1925. It was a luxury car, offered as the flagship of Lancia's production. The Trikappa 4.5-litre V8 is notable as the first of Lancia's narrow V engines, a distinguishing feature the manufacturer only abandoned in the 1970s. The car was offered as a bare rolling chassis, as torpedo or 6-seater coupé de ville. In total 847 were manufactured.

Lancia had been experimenting with V engines since the First World War, even showcasing a chassis with a narrow V 12-cylinder engine at the 1919 Paris Motor Show. In the end V12 engined cars were estimated to be too expensive to produce and a V8 was used instead.

== Specifications ==
The Trikappa was powered by a 4,594 cc Tipo 68 V8, with a bore and stroke of 75 mm × 130 mm (3.0 in × 5.1 in). The engine featured a narrow 14° angle between the cylinder banks, and a single overhead camshaft and two parallel valves per cylinder. Fed by a Zenith twin-choke carburettor, it produced 98 hp (73 kW) at 2,500 rpm, allowing the Trikappa to reach a top speed of 130 km/h (81 mph). The gearbox had four forward speeds and a triple-plate dry clutch.

In addition to the narrow V engine, another first for Lancia were brakes on all four wheels. The first examples produced left the factory with rear wheel brakes only and were upgraded later. The brake pedal acted on the front brakes and transmission brake, while the rears were actuated via a hand lever. The rest of the mechanicals were as on other coeval Lancia models: ladder frame, solid axles front and rear with semi-elliptic leaf springs and Hartford dampers.

== Bibliography ==
- Frostick, Michael (1976). Lancia. D. Watson. ISBN 0-901564-22-2.
- Amatori, Franco; et al. (1992). Storia della Lancia — Impresa Tecnologie Mercati 1906–1969. Milan: Fabbri Editori. pp. 352–353.
