= V8 engine =

Piston engine with eight cylinders in V-configuration

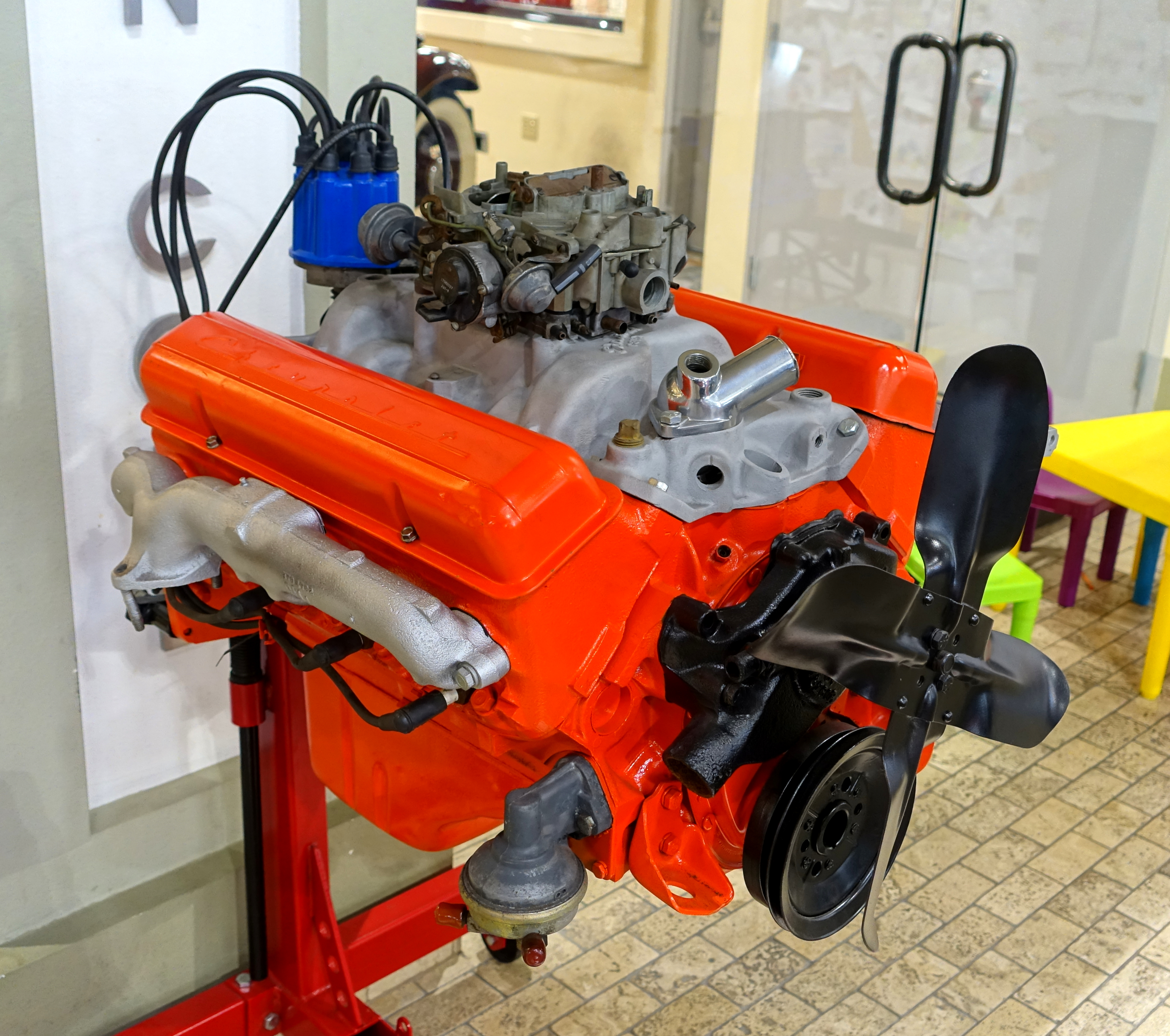
A first generation Chevrolet small-block V8, manufactured 1954–2003

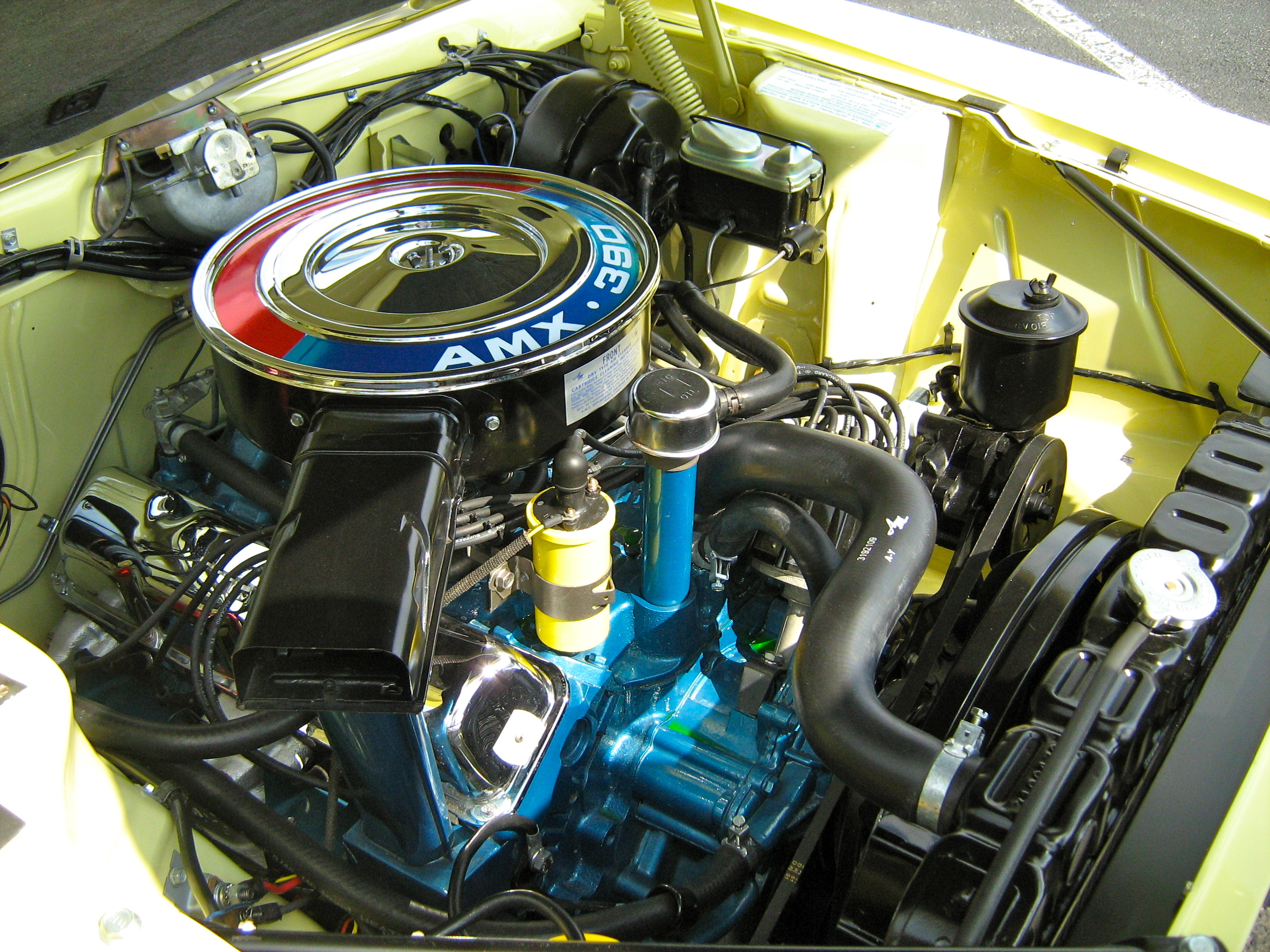
The AMC V8 engine was manufactured 1956–1991; pictured here, the AMC 390, installed in an AMX

A V8 engine is an eight-cylinder piston engine in which two banks of four cylinders share a common crankshaft and are arranged in a V configuration.

== Origins ==
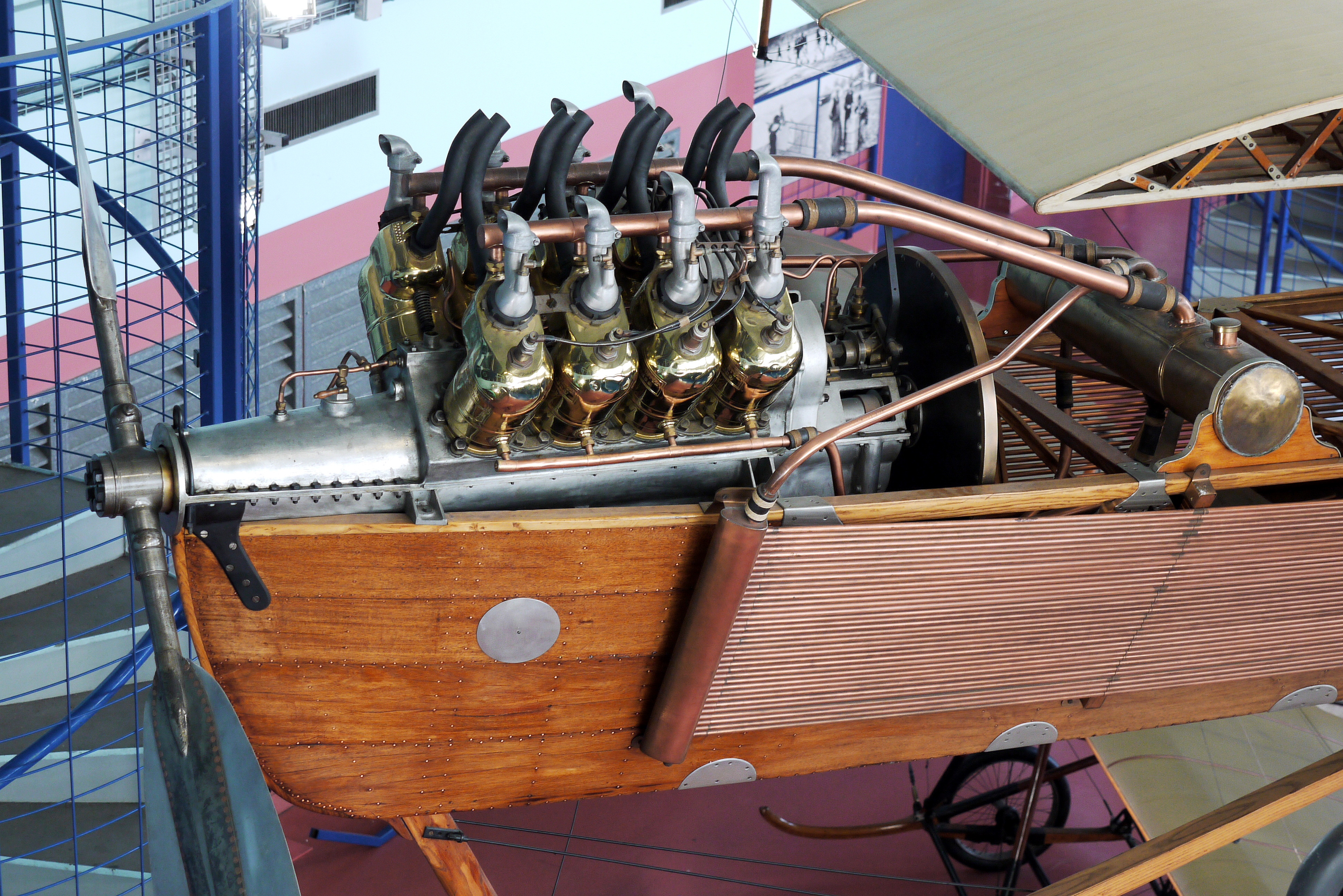
Antoinette 8V in a 1909 Antoinette VII aircraft

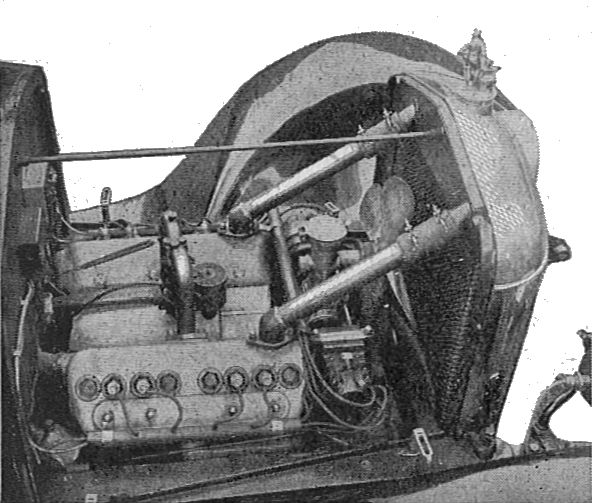
Vulcan automobile engine (c. 1919)

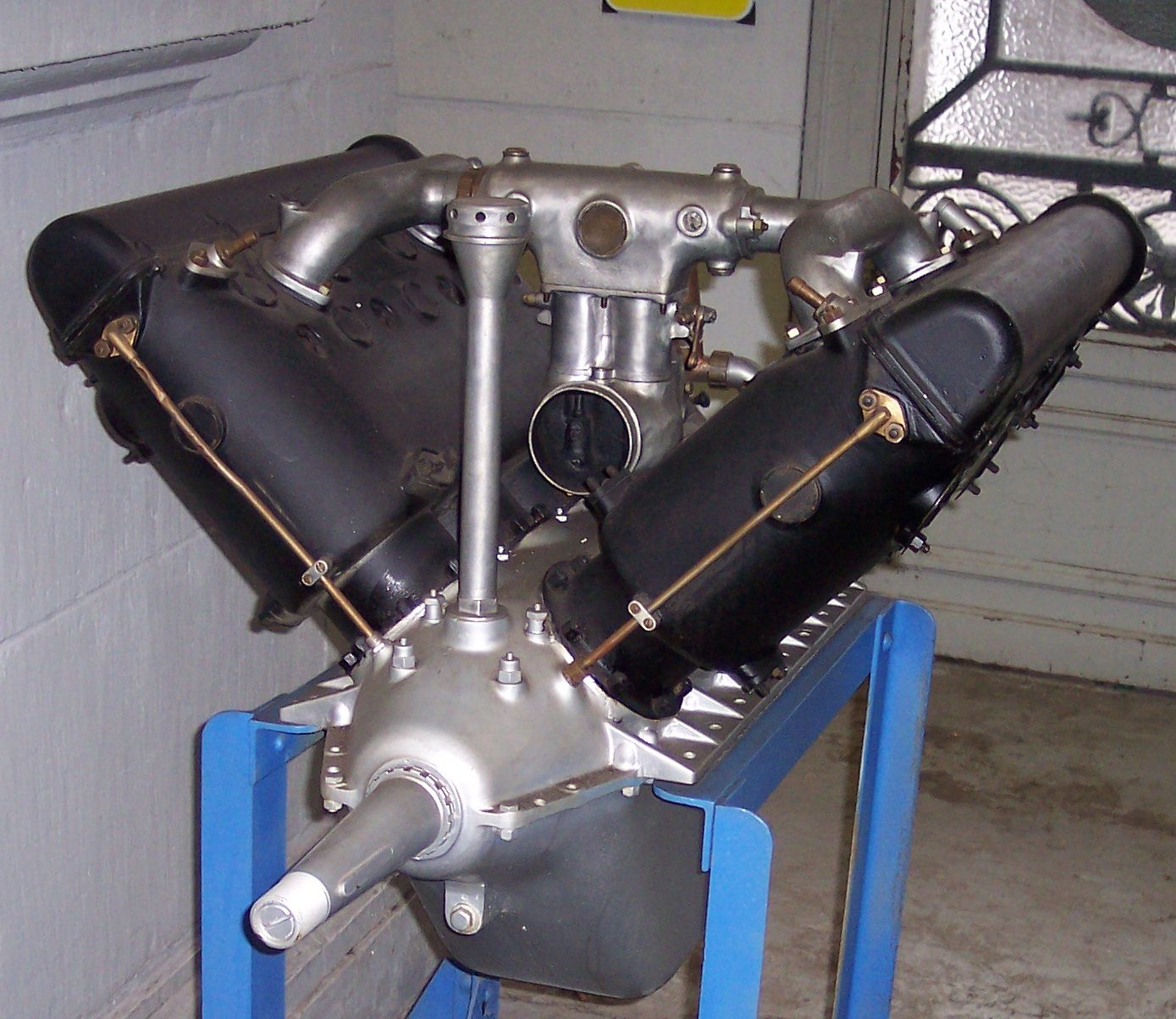
1914–1918 Hispano-Suiza 8A airplane engine

The first known V8 was the Antoinette 8V, designed by Léon Levavasseur, and built since 1904 by the French Antoinette company for use in speedboat racing, cars, and later, airplanes.

Also in 1904, V8 engines began small-scale production by Renault and Buchet for use in race cars.

The Curtiss V-8 motorcycle set an unofficial motorcycle land-speed record of 219.45 km/h (136.36 mph) on January 24, 1907.

== Design ==
=== V-angle ===
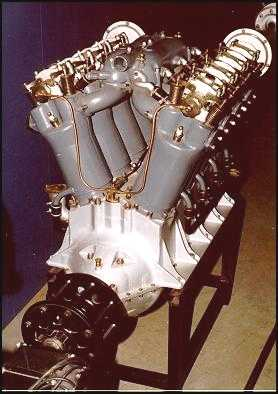
1917 Liberty L-8— an aircraft engine with a V-angle of 45°

Most engines use a V-angle (the angle between the two banks of cylinders) of 90 degrees. This angle results in good engine balance, which results in low vibrations. However, the downside is the greater width of the engine compared to those that use a smaller V-angle.

V8 engines with a 60-degree V-angle were used in the 1996–1999 Ford Taurus SHO, the 2005–2011 Volvo XC90, and the 2006–2009 Volvo S80. The Ford engine used a 60-degree V-angle because it was based on a V6 engine with a 60-degree V-angle. Both the Ford and Volvo engines were used in transverse engine chassis, which were designed for a front-wheel-drive layout (with an on-demand all-wheel drive system in the case of the Volvos). To reduce the vibrations caused by the unbalanced 60-degree V-angle, the Volvo engines used a balance shaft and offset split crankpins. The Rolls-Royce Meteorite tank engine also used a 60-degree V-angle, since it was derived from the 60 degree V12 Rolls-Royce Meteor which in turn was based on the Rolls-Royce Merlin V12 engine.

Other V-angles have been used occasionally. The Lancia Trikappa, Lancia Dilambda, and Lancia Astura, produced 1922–1939, used narrow angle V8 engines (based on the Lancia V4 engine) with V-angles of 14–24 degrees. The 1932 Miller four-wheel drive racing cars used a V8 engine with a V-angle of 45 degrees. The 8-cylinder versions of the 1945 through 1966 EMD 567 diesel locomotive engine also used a V-angle of 45 degrees.

=== Crankshaft configuration ===
==== Cross-plane crankshaft ====
Standard firing configuration of a cross-plane V8, with a 90 degree V-angle

Most V8 engines fitted to road cars use a cross-plane crankshaft since this configuration produces less vibration due to the perfect primary balance and secondary balance. The cross-plane crankshaft has the four crank pins (numbered from the front) at angles of 0, 90, 270, and 180 degrees, which results in a cross shape for the crankshaft when it is viewed from one end.

The rumbling exhaust sound produced by a typical cross-plane V8 engine is partly due to the uneven firing order within each of the two banks of four cylinders. A usual firing order of L-R-L-L-R-L-R-R (or R-L-R-R-L-R-L-L) results in uneven intake and exhaust pulse spacing for each bank. When separate exhaust systems are used for each bank of cylinders, this uneven pulsing results in the rumbling sound typically associated with V8 engines. However, racing engines seek to avoid these uneven exhaust pressure pulses to maximize the power output. The 1960s cross-plane V8 racing engines used long primary exhaust pipes (such as the Ford GT40 endurance racing car) or located the exhaust ports on the inside of the V-angle (such as the Lotus 38 IndyCar) to link the exhaust systems from each bank and provide even exhaust gas pulses.

==== Flat-plane crankshaft ====
A flat-plane crankshaft configuration provides two benefits. Mechanically, the crankshaft can be machined from a flat billet and does not require counterweights so it is lighter. However, it produces more vibration due to a secondary imbalance. Most early V8 road car engines also used a flat-plane crankshaft since this was simpler to design and build than a cross-plane crankshaft. Early flat-plane V8 engines included the 1910 De Dion-Bouton engine, the 1915 Peerless engine, and the 1915 Cadillac engine. A flat-plane crankshaft is used by many V8 engines fitted to racing cars.

From the gas dynamics aspect, the flat-plane crankshaft allows for even exhaust gas pulses to be achieved with a simple exhaust system. The design was popularized in motor racing by the 1961–1965 Coventry Climax FWMV Formula One engine, and the 1967–1985 Cosworth DFV engine was highly successful in Formula One. Several production sports cars have used flat-plane V8 engines, such as every Ferrari V8 model (from the 1973 Ferrari 308 GT4 to the 2019–present Ferrari F8 Tributo), the Lotus Esprit V8, the Porsche 918 Spyder, and the McLaren 720S.

== Automobile use ==
The first V8 engine used in a road-going car was the 1905 Rolls-Royce built in the United Kingdom. This model was initially equipped with a 3.5 L (214 cu in) V8 engine. However, only three cars were made before Rolls-Royce reverted to using straight-six engines for their cars.

In 1907, the Hewitt Touring Car became the first car built in the United States with a V8 engine. The engine was designed and built by Edward R. Hewitt who emphasized the V8's superiority to the typical I4 and I6 and six-cylinder engines of the time because of its lower weight and easier to make crankshaft compared to the I6s of equal power as well as the V8 not taking much more space than a I4.

The 1910 De Dion-Bouton— built in France— is considered to be the first V8 engine produced in significant quantities.

The 1914 Cadillac L-head V8 engine is considered the first road-going V8 engine to be mass-produced in significant quantities, with 13,000 sold the first year. This engine was built in the United States and was greatly assisted by Cadillac's pioneering use of electric starter motors.

The popularity of V8 engines in cars was significantly increased following the 1932 introduction of the Ford Flathead V8.

By the early 21st century, the use of V8 engines in passenger vehicles declined as automobile manufacturers opted for more fuel efficient, lower capacity engines, or hybrid and electric drivetrains.

=== Size, layout, and classification ===
The displacement of modern V8 engines is typically from 3.5 to 6.4 L (214 to 391 cu in). However, size of production engines varies widely - for example the BMW M502 V8 introduced in the 1954 BMW 502 displaced only 2.6 L (2,580 cc), while the 1971-1978 Cadillac Eldorado was powered by an 8.2 L (500 cu in) motor. V8 engines intended for motorsport are often small and short-stroke to maximize RPMs and thus power. The Cosworth DFV 3.0 L (183 cu in) is an example.

Due to its large external dimensions, V8 engines are typically used in cars that use a longitudinal engine layout and rear-wheel drive (or all-wheel drive). However, V8 engines have also occasionally been used in transverse engine front-wheel drive vehicles, sometimes using closer cylinder bore spacings and narrower cylinder bank angles to reduce their space requirements.

The classification of 'big-block' or 'small-block' refers to the engine's external dimensions and does not necessarily indicate the actual engine displacement. Engines with displacements from 6.0 to 6.6 L (366 to 403 cu in) have been classified as both small-block and big-block, depending on the particular manufacturer's range of engines.

=== Motorsport ===
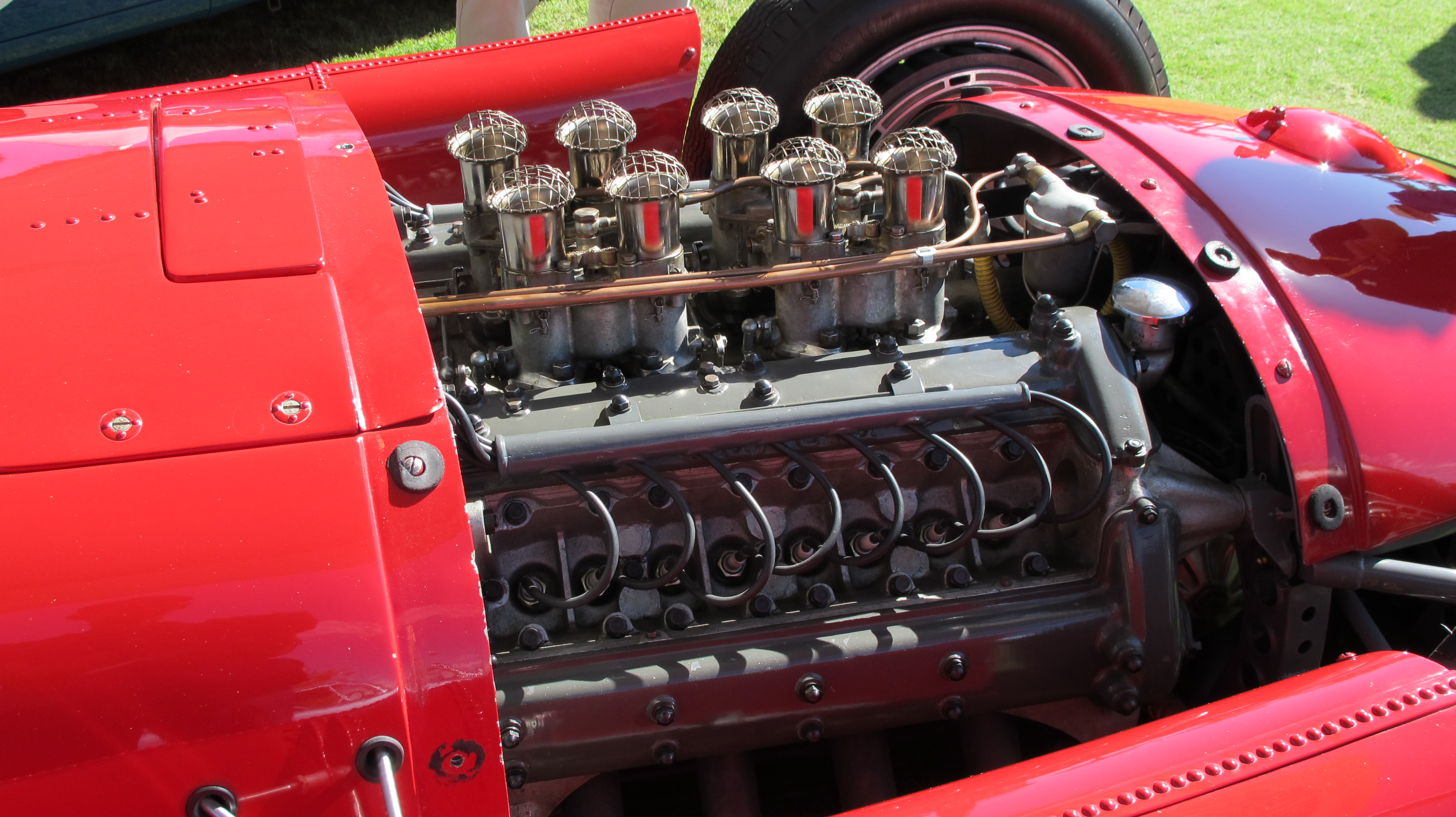
1956 Lancia D50 Formula One engine

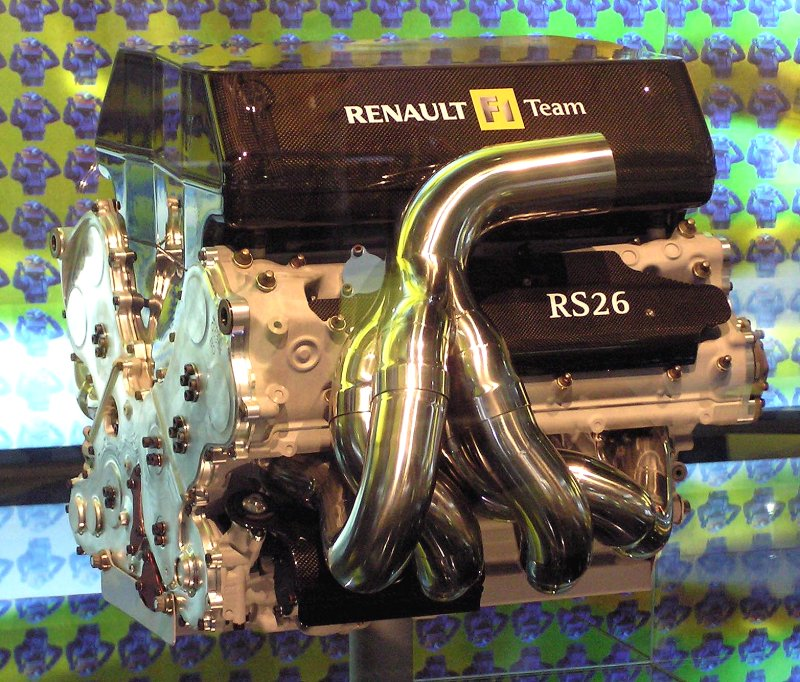
2006 Renault RS26 Formula One engine

V8 engines have been used in many forms of motorsport, from Formula One, IndyCar, NASCAR, DTM and V8 Supercars circuit racing, to Top Fuel drag racing.

==== Formula One ====
Among the first V8 Formula One cars to compete were the 1952 AFM entry and the 1954 Lancia D50, with a development of the latter powering Juan Manuel Fangio's 1956 car to victory in the Drivers' Championship. The 1.5 L Formula One era of 1961–1965 included V8 engines from Ferrari, Coventry Climax, British Racing Motors (BRM), and Automobili Turismo e Sport (ATS). The driver's championships for the 1962, 1963, 1964, and 1965 seasons were won by drivers of V8-powered cars.

From 1962 through 1965, the top three manufacturers in each season's Constructor's Championship all predominantly used V8 engines in their cars. In 1966, the engine capacity limits were increased to 3.0 L (183 cu in) (or 1.5 litres with a supercharger), and both the 1966 and 1967 Constructor's Championships were won by cars powered by the Repco-Brabham V8 engine.

From 1968 until 1981, the Cosworth DFV V8 engine dominated Formula One racing. During this time, the Manufacturers' Championship was won by Cosworth DFV-powered cars every season except 1975, 1976, 1977, and 1979, which were won by 12-cylinder Ferraris. After a long period of dominance, the Cosworth DFV was eventually outpaced by turbocharged straight-four and V6 engines.

The next period of significant V8 usage in Formula One was from 2006 to 2013, when the rules mandated use of 2.4 L (146 cu in) naturally-aspirated V8 engines, with regular power outputs between 730 and 810 hp (in order to reduce the power outputs being achieved by the previous 3.0 litre V10 engines). These were replaced by 1.6 litre turbocharged V6 engines for the 2014 and later seasons.

==== NASCAR ====
V8 engines have dominated American premier stock car racing NASCAR series since its inaugural 1949 season. However, there wasn't a strict ruleset to follow until the 1972 season, when engines were no longer allowed to be any bigger than 358 cu in (5.9 L) for the purpose of reducing speeds caused by the rapid aerodynamic advancements from 1969 to 1971.

==== Drag racing ====
In the American Top Fuel class of drag racing, V8 engines displacing 500 cu in (8 L) today produce outputs of over 7,000 kW (10,000 hp). and 10,000 N⋅m (7,400 lb⋅ft). The engines used in Top Fuel and Funny car drag racing are typically based on the aluminium-conversion Chrysler 426 Hemi engine and run on highly explosive nitromethane fuel.

==== Land speed record racing ====
The world's fastest non-jet-powered (i.e., piston-engine powered) wheeled land vehicle, the Speed Demon, which achieved a speed of 744.072 km/h (462.345 mph) in 2017, is powered by a V8 engine based on the Chevrolet small-block engine design.

=== Automobile use by country ===
==== Australia ====
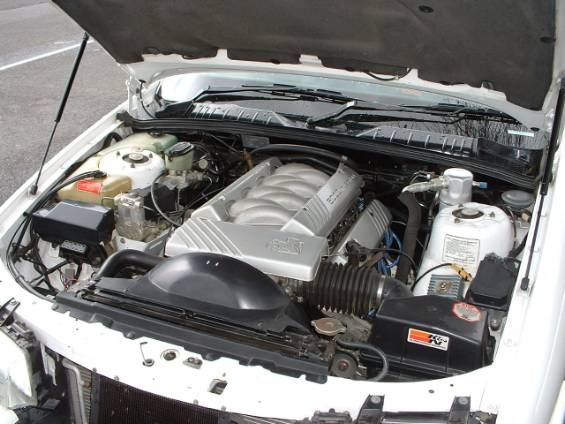
1991–1994 Holden V8 engine

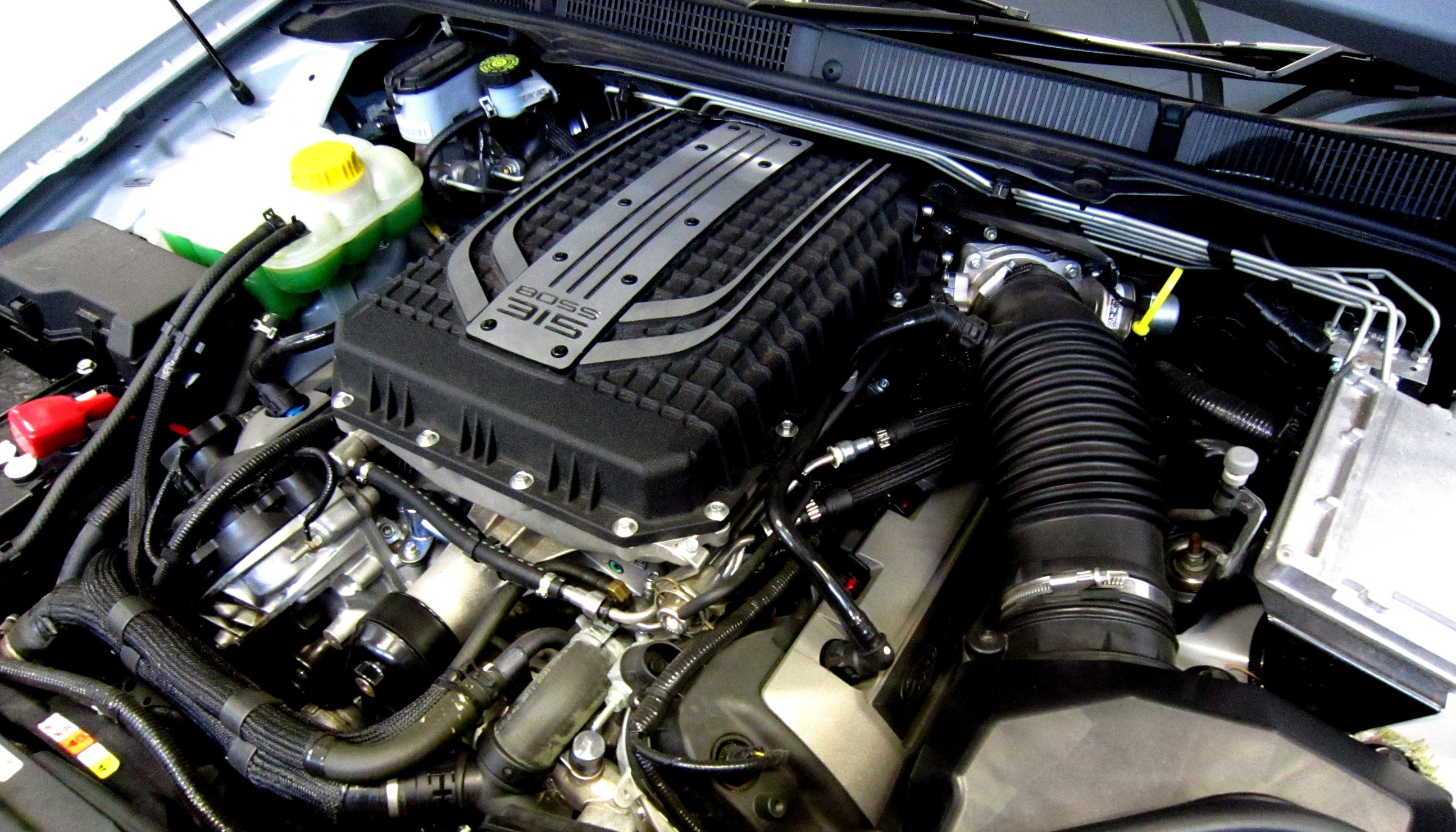
2011 Ford Modular V8 ("Boss") engine

The first Australian-designed car to use a V8 engine was the 1965 Chrysler Valiant (AP6), which was available with an American-built 4.5 L (273 cu in) Chrysler engine. The first locally designed V8 Ford was the 1966 Ford Falcon (XR) and the first V8 Holden was the 1968 Holden HK, both using engines supplied by their parent companies in the United States.

The first V8 engine to be mass-produced in Australia was the 1969–2000 Holden V8 engine. This cast-iron overhead valve engine used a V-angle of 90 degrees and was built in displacements of 4.1 L (253 cu in) and 5.0 L (308 cu in), the latter being de-stroked to 5.0 L (304 cu in) in 1985. The Holden V8 engine was used in various models, including the Kingswood, Monaro, Torana, Commodore, and Statesman. Versions tuned for higher performance were sold by Holden Dealer Team and Holden Special Vehicles, including versions stroked to up to 5.7 L (350 cu in). The Holden V8 engine was also used in touring car racing and formed the basis of the Repco-Holden engine used in Formula 5000 racing. In 1999, the Holden V8 engine began to be replaced by the imported General Motors LS1 V8 engine.

In 1971, Ford Australia began local production of the Ford 'Cleveland' V8, an overhead valve cast-iron engine. The engine was produced in displacements of 4.9 L (302 cu in) and 5.8 L (351 cu in) for use in the Australian Ford Falcon and Ford Fairlane models. It was also used in several low-volume DeTomaso sports cars and luxury sedans built in Italy. Australian production ceased in 1982 when Ford Australia temporarily stopped production of V8 cars. From 1991 until 2016, the Ford Falcon was available with the imported Ford Windsor, Ford Barra, or Ford Modular V8 engines; the latter was marketed as "Boss" and locally assembled from a mix of imported and local parts.

A 4.4 L (269 cu in) version of the Rover V8 engine was produced in Australia for the ill-fated 1973–1975 Leyland P76 sedan. The engine had an overhead valve design and was the only all-aluminum engine made in Australia.

==== China ====
The 1958–1965 Hongqi CA72 was a luxury car, of which approximately 200 were built for government officials. It was powered by a 5.6 L (340 cu in) Chrysler LA engine and built on the chassis of a 1950s Chrysler Imperial.

==== Czech Republic ====
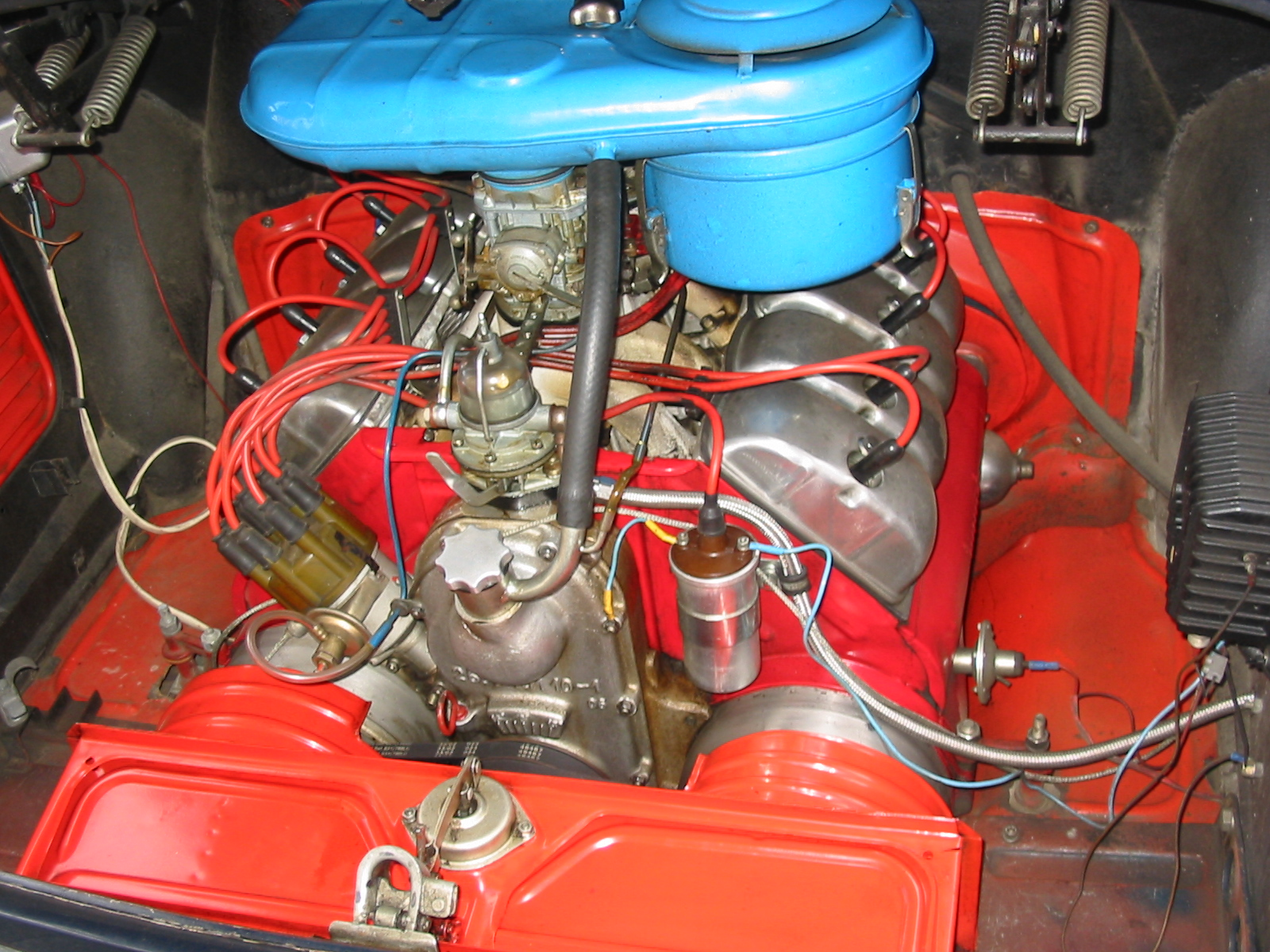
1956–1962 Tatra T603 engine

The 1934–1938 Tatra 77 rear-engined sedan was initially powered by 3.0 L (183 cu in) petrol V8, which was air-cooled and used an overhead camshaft that operated the valves using a 'walking beam' rocker arrangement. This model line continued until 1999 when the Tatra 700 ended production.

Tatra also produced diesel V8 truck engines from the 1939 Tatra 81 to the present day Tatra 815.

==== France ====
French manufacturers were pioneering in their use of V8 engines in the early 1900s with the 1904 Antoinette aircraft engine (the first known V8 engine) and the 1910 De Dion-Bouton. However, there were few French automotive V8 engines in the following decades, with manufacturers such as Delage, Delahaye, Talbot-Lago, Bugatti, and Hotchkiss using six-cylinder or straight-eight engines instead.

From 1935 until 1954, Matford (Ford's French subsidiary, later renamed to 'Ford SAF') produced cars with V8 engines, closely based on contemporary American Ford models. Simca purchased the Ford SAF in 1954 and continued to produce various models powered by the Ford Flathead V8 until 1969.

After WW2, France imposed very steep tax horsepower charges - the owners of cars with engines above 2 L were financially penalized, so France had a small domestic market for larger-engined cars, such as the V8. Despite this, Facel Vega produced luxury and sports cars powered by Chrysler V8 engines from 1954 through 1964.

==== Germany ====
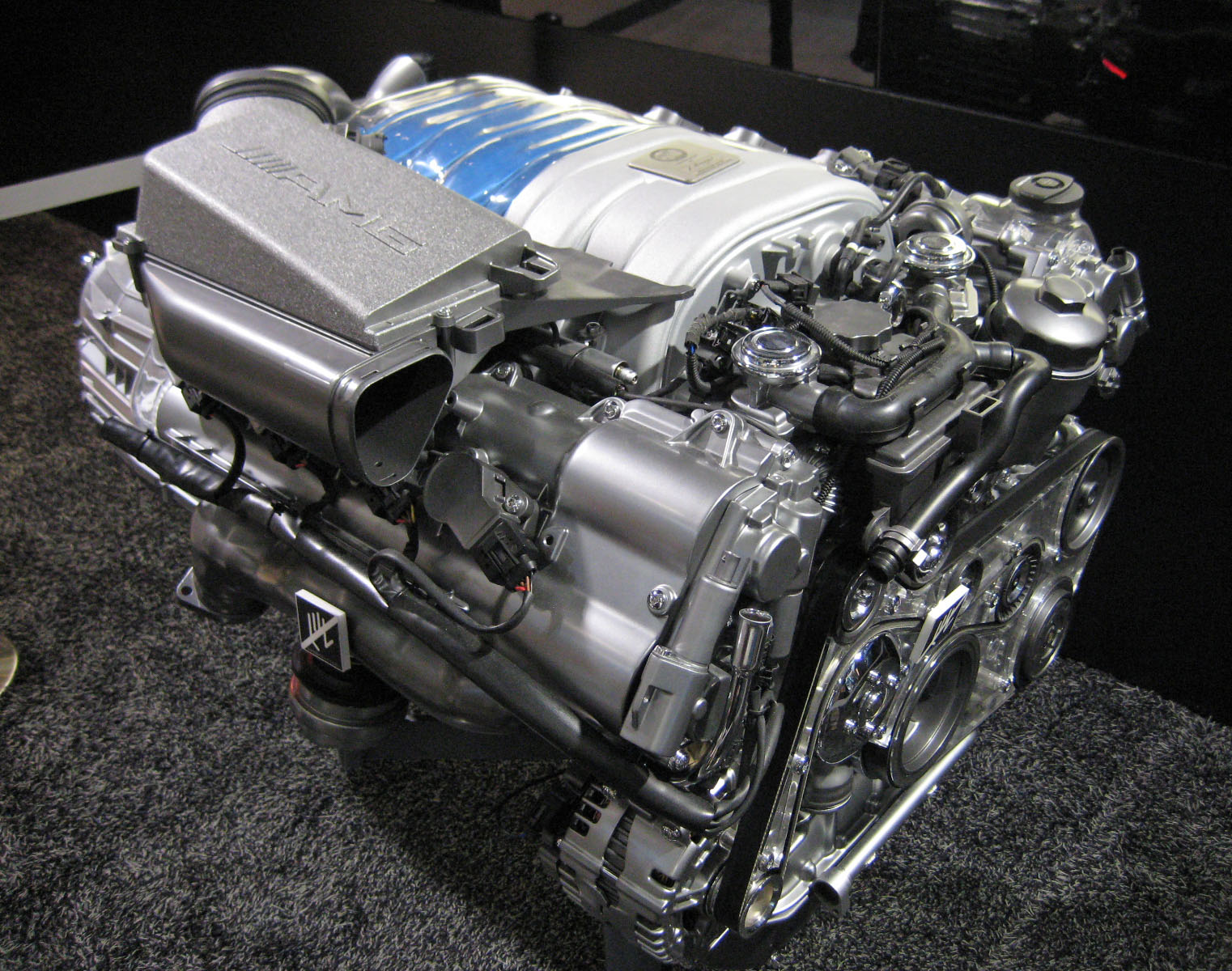
2006–2015 Mercedes-Benz M156 engine

One of the first German V8 engines was the 1928–1945 Argus As 10 aircraft engine. This engine was air-cooled, used an 'inverted V' design, and was used in several training, surveillance, and communications airplanes.

From 1933 until 1940, the Horch 830 luxury cars were powered by V8 engines (sold alongside Horch's larger straight-eight engines). Shortly after, the 1934–1937 Stoewer Greif V8 was powered by a 2.5 L (153 cu in) V8 engine.

BMW's first V8 engine was the 1954–1965 BMW OHV V8 engine, a petrol engine with overhead valves and all-aluminum construction. The company resumed production of V8 engines in 1992 with the BMW M60 aluminum double overhead camshaft engine, and V8 engines have remained in production until today. BMW's first turbocharged V8 engine was the 1998–2009 M67 twin-turbocharged diesel engine. The first turbocharged V8 petrol engine from BMW was the 2008–present BMW N63 engine.

Their first eight-cylinder engine since passenger car and motorsport straight-eight engine production stopped in 1944 and 1955 respectively, Mercedes-Benz began production of the Mercedes-Benz M100 petrol V8 engine in 1963 and has continued production of V8 engines to the present day. The M100 had a single overhead camshaft, a cast-iron block, and an aluminium head. Supercharging was first used on the Mercedes-Benz M113 engine in 2002 and turbocharging was first used on non-commercial diesel V8 engines in 1999 with the OM628 and on petrol engines with the M278 engine in 2010.

Porsche's first road car to use a V8 engine was the 1978 Porsche 928 coupe. Its first to use a V8 diesel engine was the second-generation Cayenne S Diesel in 2014.

Audi's first road car to use a V8 engine was the 1988 Audi V8 luxury sedan. Its first model to use a V8 diesel engine was the D2 A8 3.3 TDI in 2000.

==== Italy ====
===== Alfa Romeo =====
The first V8-engined Alfa Romeo road car was the 1967–1969 Alfa Romeo 33 Stradale mid-engined sports car, of which 18 were produced. This was followed by the 1970–1977 Alfa Romeo Montreal front-engined sports car. The engines for both cars are based on the 90-degree V8 engine from the Alfa Romeo Tipo 33 racing car, and have double overhead camshafts and a dry sump. The 33 Stradale engine has a displacement of 2.00 L (122 cu in) and a flat-plane crankshaft, while the Montreal uses an engine enlarged to 2.6 L (160 cu in) and uses a cross-plane crankshaft.

The 2007–2010 Alfa Romeo 8C Competizione / Spider sports cars are powered by a 4.7 L (290 cu in) version of the Ferrari F136 engine with a cross-plane crankshaft.

===== Ferrari =====
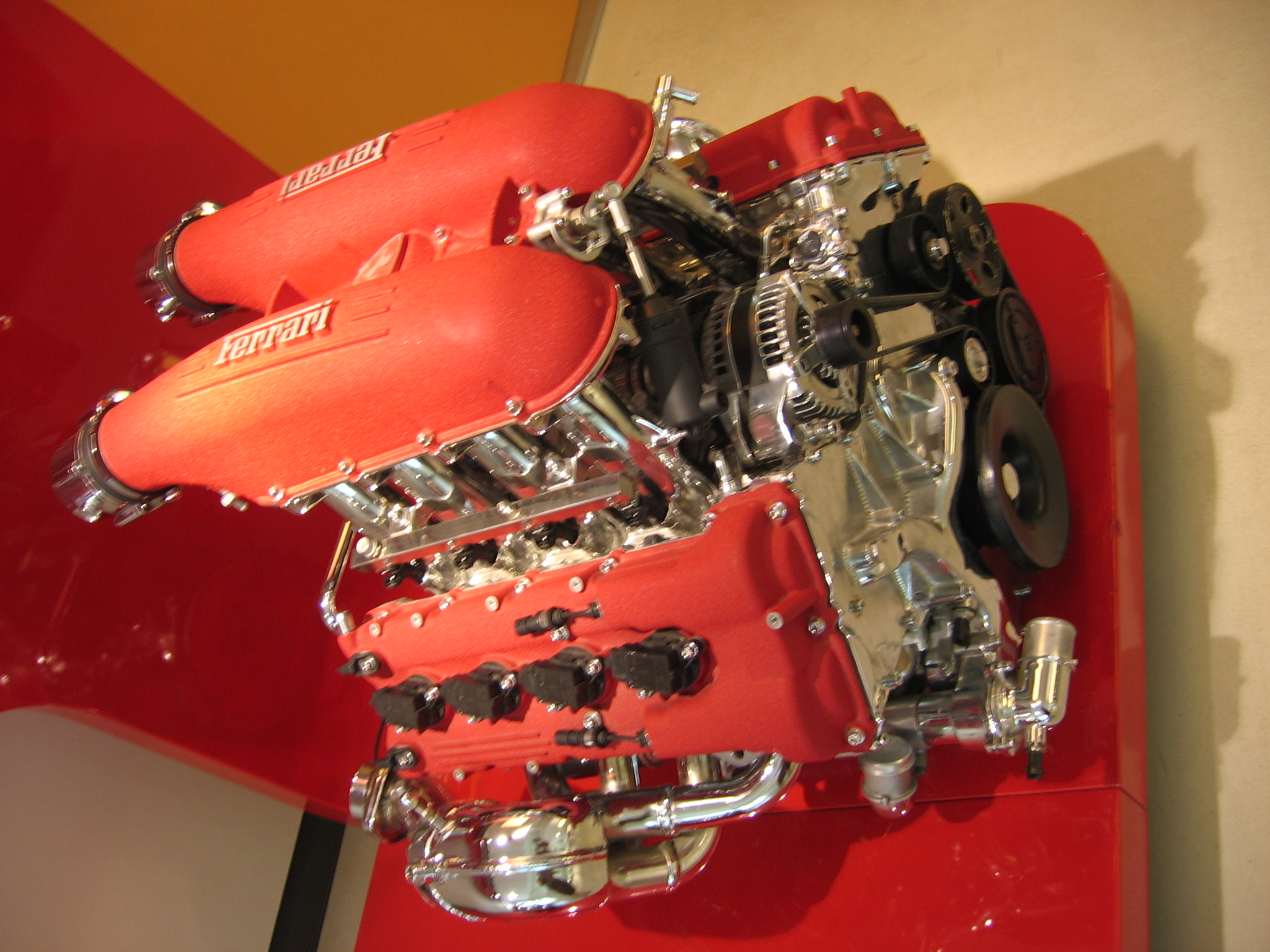
2004–2009 Ferrari F430 engine

Ferrari's first contact with V8 engines was the Vittorio Jano-designed 1955 Lancia-Ferrari D50, a Formula One racing car that the company acquired as part of its purchase of Lancia's Formula One racing department. The first Ferrari-developed V8 engines were used in the 1962 Ferrari 248 SP and Ferrari 268 SP sports prototype racing cars designed by Carlo Chiti. This engine had a single overhead camshaft and was rear-mounted in the vehicles.

The company's first V8 road car was the 1973–1974 Dino 308 GT4 mid-engined sports car. The engine is a 90-degree all-aluminum V8 with double overhead camshafts. In 1975, the 2.0 L (122 cu in) engine in the Ferrari 208 GT4 became the smallest production V8 engine ever produced. The model lineage of mid-engined V8 road cars continued until the end of production of the 2019–2023 Ferrari F8 Tributo.

Five-valve-per-cylinder versions were used from 1994 until 2005 in the Ferrari F355 and Ferrari 360. Turbocharging was introduced on the 1984–1987 Ferrari 288 GTO flagship car, and the range of entry-level mid-engined sports cars switched to turbocharging with the 2015 Ferrari 488.

The Formula One team resumed using V8 engines for the 2006–2013 seasons, beginning with the Ferrari 248 F1.

===== Maserati =====
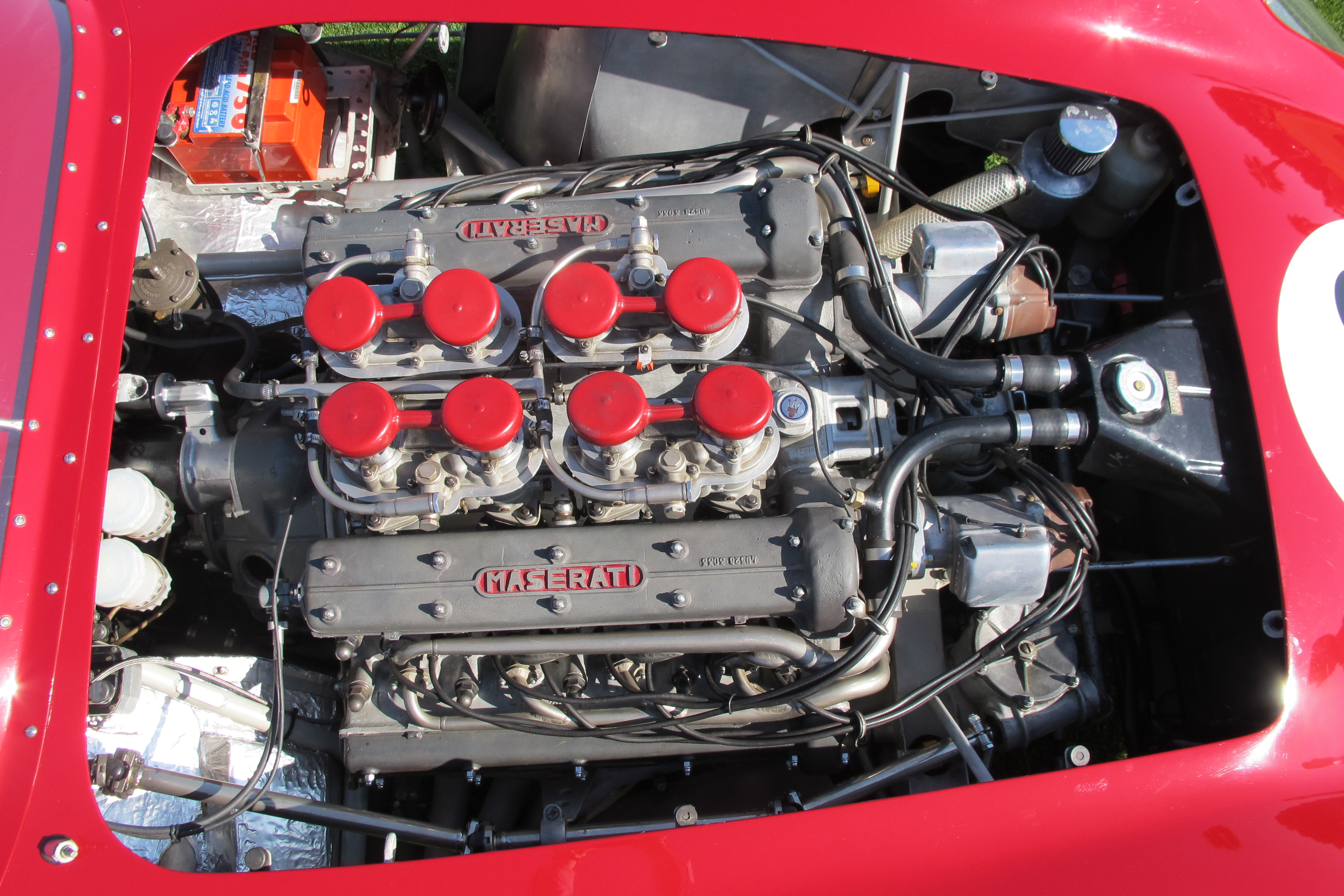
1956–1958 Maserati 450S engine

The first Maserati V8 road car was the 1959–1965 Maserati 5000 GT luxury coupe, of which only 34 cars were produced. The 5000 GT used a 4.9 L (299 cu in) overhead camshaft engine derived from the Maserati 450S racing car. Developments of this engine were used in the 1963–1969 Maserati Quattroporte I luxury sedan, the 1967–1973 Maserati Ghibli, the 1971–1978 Maserati Bora 2-seat coupe, and several other models.

The 1990–1996 Maserati Shamal 2+2 coupe introduced a 3.2 L (195 cu in) turbocharged V8 engine based on the existing Maserati Biturbo V6. This engine was later replaced by the naturally aspirated 4.2 L (256 cu in) Ferrari F136 V8 engine, beginning with the 2001 Maserati Coupé / Spyder.

===== Other Italian manufacturers =====
During the 1920s and 1930s, Lancia produced a line of range-topping luxury cars powered by V8 engines: the 1922–1925 Lancia Trikappa, the 1928–1935 Lancia Dilambda, and the 1931–1939 Lancia Astura. The engines ranged in displacement from 2.6–4.6 L (159–281 cu in) and used unusually narrow V-angles of 14 to 24 degrees with a single overhead camshaft. In the 1980s, an engine derived from Ferrari's V8 engine was transverse-mounted in the Lancia Thema 8.32.

The only Fiat car to use a V8 engine was the Fiat 8V, of which approximately 100 were produced 1952–1954. The 2.0 L (122 cu in) pushrod engine used an all-aluminium construction and an unusual V-angle of 70 degrees. Fiat also began production of V8 diesel truck engines for the 1975 Des-8280, initially in the naturally aspirated form before switching to turbocharging in the mid-1980s.

Lamborghini's V8 powered models are the 1972–1979 Lamborghini Urraco 2+2 coupe, 1976–1979 Lamborghini Silhouette 2-seat convertible, and 1981–1988 Lamborghini Jalpa 2-seat convertible. The 2018–present Lamborghini Urus SUV uses a Volkswagen Group turbocharged V8 engine. A new bespoke V8 are made for the first time since the Japla for the 2025-present Lamborghini Temerario.

==== Japan ====
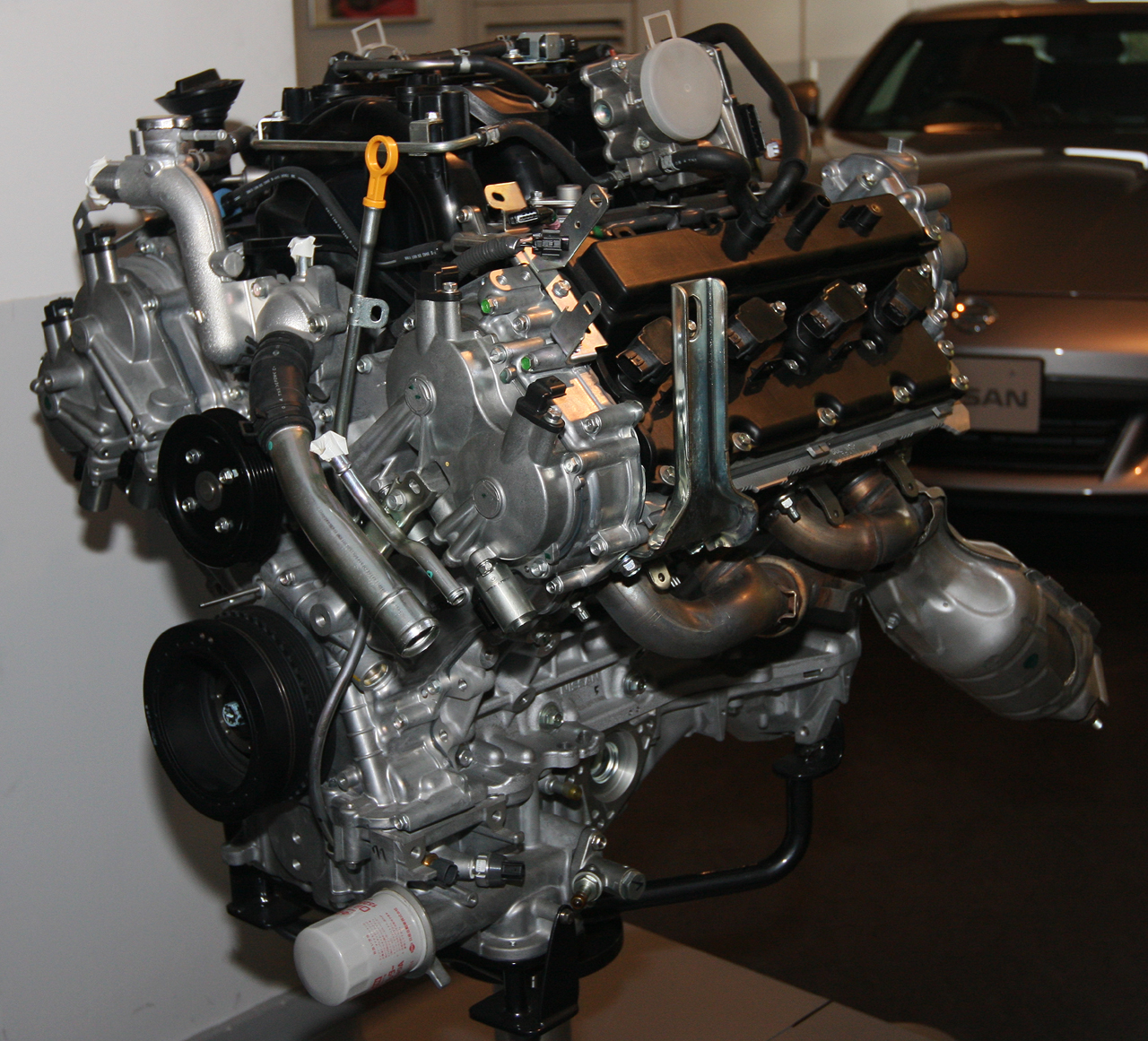
2008 Nissan VK50VE engine

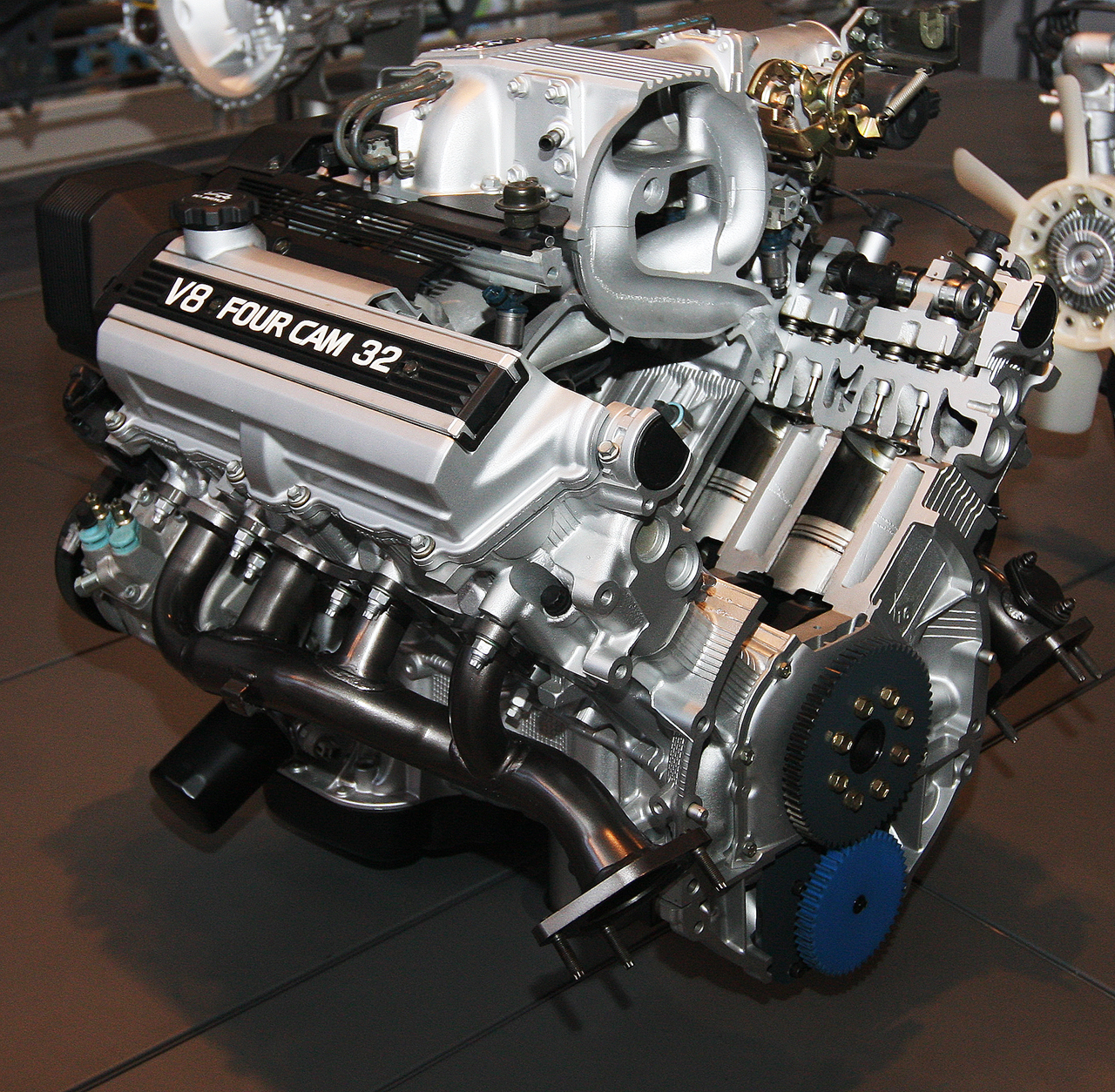
1989 Toyota 1UZ-FE engine

Japanese manufacturers have not been significant producers of V8 engines for passenger cars due to Japanese government road tax regulations that impose higher charges for engines that exceed 2.0 L (122 cu in). However, several passenger cars have been produced with V8 engines for consumers and for use in motor racing.

===== Honda =====
Honda has never produced V8 engines for passenger vehicles, although they did experiment with a CVCC V8 sportscar project until it was cancelled as a result of the 1973 Fuel Crisis. In the late 1990s, the company resisted considerable pressure from its American dealers for a V8 engine, with American Honda reportedly sending one dealer a shipment of "V8" vegetable juice to silence them. The only Honda car sold with a V8 engine was the 1993–1998 Honda Crossroad SUV, which was a rebadged Land Rover Discovery Series I fitted with the Rover V8 engine.

In motor racing, the Honda Indy V8 was produced for the 2003–2011 IndyCar racing series and was the control engine for the 2006 through 2011 seasons. The engine was a 3.0–3.5 L (183–214 cu in) all-aluminium V8 with double-overhead camshafts, with a power output of 650 hp (485 kW; 659 PS) and a 10,500 rpm redline. The 2006–2008 Honda Racing F1 Team used 2.4 L V8 engines, which produced around 560–580 kW (750–775 hp) at 19,000 rpm, as mandated by Formula One regulations.

===== Mitsubishi =====
From 1999 to 2000, Mitsubishi briefly sold the Mitsubishi 8A8 engine, which was a 4.5 L (275 cu in) all-aluminium V8 engine with double overhead camshafts and direct injection. The engine was fitted to the Mitsubishi Proudia luxury sedan and Mitsubishi Dignity limousine; however, financial pressures forced the company to discontinue sales of both these vehicles after only fifteen months.

===== Nissan =====
The 1965–1989 Nissan Y engine is Nissan's first V8 engine, which uses a pushrod design and had a displacement of 4.0 L (244 cu in). Its primary use was in the Nissan President limousine. The Y engine was replaced by the 1989–2001 Nissan VH engine, which is an all-aluminum construction with double overhead camshafts and displacements of 4.1–4.5 L (250–275 cu in). This was replaced by the Nissan VK engine in 2002, which remains in production today. The VK engine is an all-aluminium construction with double overhead camshafts and displacements of 4.5–5.6 L (275–342 cu in).

===== Toyota =====
The first mass-produced Japanese V8 engine was the Toyota V engine, introduced in the 1964 Toyota Crown Eight luxury car. The Toyota V engine was an all-aluminum construction, used a pushrod valvetrain, and was produced until 1997. The Toyota UZ engine has double overhead camshafts and was made from 1989 until 2013, while the Toyota UR engine added direct injection and has been in production since 2006.

From 2006 to 2009, the Toyota Racing Formula One team cars were powered by 2.4 L (146 cu in) naturally-aspirated V8 engines, as mandated by the Formula One rules. These Toyota engines were rated to produce 559 kW (750 hp) at 19,000 rpm (552 kW (740 hp) at 18,000 rpm for 2009) and were also used by the Williams, Midland, and Jordan teams.

==== Korea ====
Hyundai's first passenger car V8 engine was the 1999–2009 Hyundai Omega engine, which was based on the Mitsubishi 8A8 engine (see above). The Omega engine was replaced by the Hyundai Tau engine, which is an all-aluminium construction with double overhead camshafts and was produced from 2008 until 2021, when it was retired in favour of a twin-turbocharged V6 in the next-generation Genesis G90.

==== Sweden ====
Volvo developed the B36 V8 engine in 1952, which was intended to be used in the planned Volvo Philip car. The project was canceled, but the engine has been used in trucks since 1956.

In partnership with Yamaha Motor Company, Volvo developed the 4.4 litre Volvo B8444S engine. It was offered in the Volvo XC90 starting in 2005 and the Volvo S80 starting in 2006. When Ford Motor Company sold Volvo Cars to Geely Holding Group, the use of the engine was discontinued in favour of one line of i4 engines for all its models.

Koenigsegg initially used twin-supercharged versions of the Ford Modular V8 engine in its 2002–2004 Koenigsegg CC8S and 2004–2006 Koenigsegg CCR. The company switched to a new twin-supercharged engine they developed for the 2006–2010 Koenigsegg CCX. An updated version of their own V8 was introduced in the 2011 Koenigsegg Agera and has been used on all models since then.

==== Soviet Union and Russian Federation ====
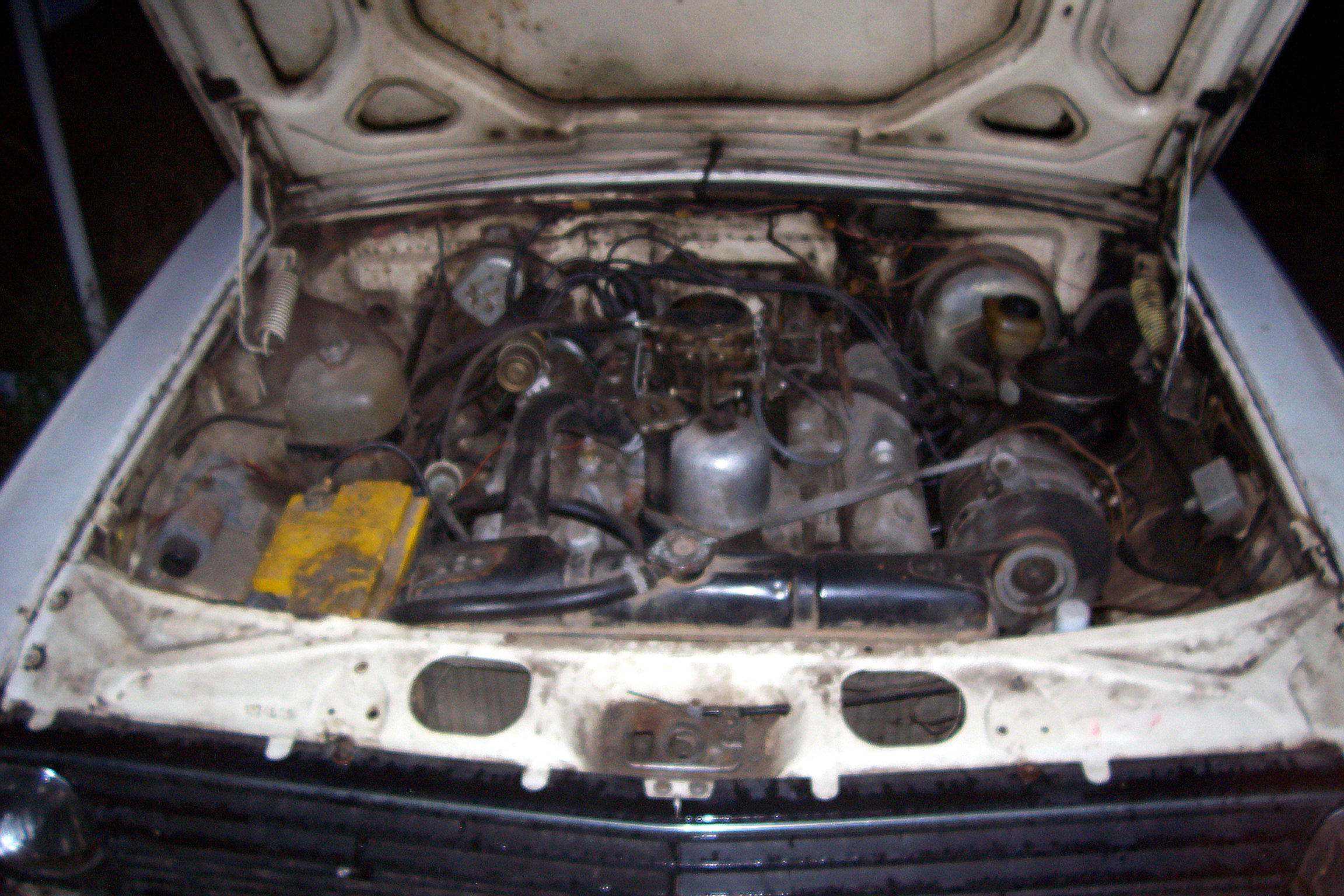
1992 GAZ-24-34 Volga engine

The 1958–1967 ZIL-111 limousine was among the first Soviet cars powered by a V8 engine. The engine was an all-aluminium construction with a pushrod valvetrain. Production of ZIL limousines powered by V8 engines continued until the ZIL-41047 was discontinued in 2002.

The 1959–1988 GAZ Chaika was powered by a 5.5 L (336 cu in) V8 engine with an all-aluminium construction and a pushrod valvetrain. This engine was also used in several limited-edition models for the KGB.

Diesel engines of the V8 configuration are currently produced by the Yaroslavl Motor Plant, KamAZ. Sollers produces petrol engines for Aurus cars.

==== United Kingdom ====
===== Aston Martin =====
The 1969–1972 Aston Martin DBS V8 coupe/convertible was Aston Martin's first V8 model. This engine was an all-aluminium construction with double overhead camshafts and was used in several models until 2000, when the Virage model was discontinued.

Production of V8-engined Aston Martin cars resumed in 2005 with a new generation of the Vantage, powered by the Jaguar AJ-V8 naturally aspirated V8 engine. Since 2016, Aston Martin has switched to the Mercedes-Benz M177 turbocharged V8 engine, beginning with the DB11 model.

===== McLaren =====
Every McLaren road car since the brand's 2010 relaunch has been powered by the McLaren M838T twin-turbocharged V8 engine, which was introduced in the McLaren 12C (then called the 'MP4-12C') coupe. This engine is an all-aluminium construction with double overhead camshafts and a flat-plane crankshaft.

===== Rolls-Royce =====
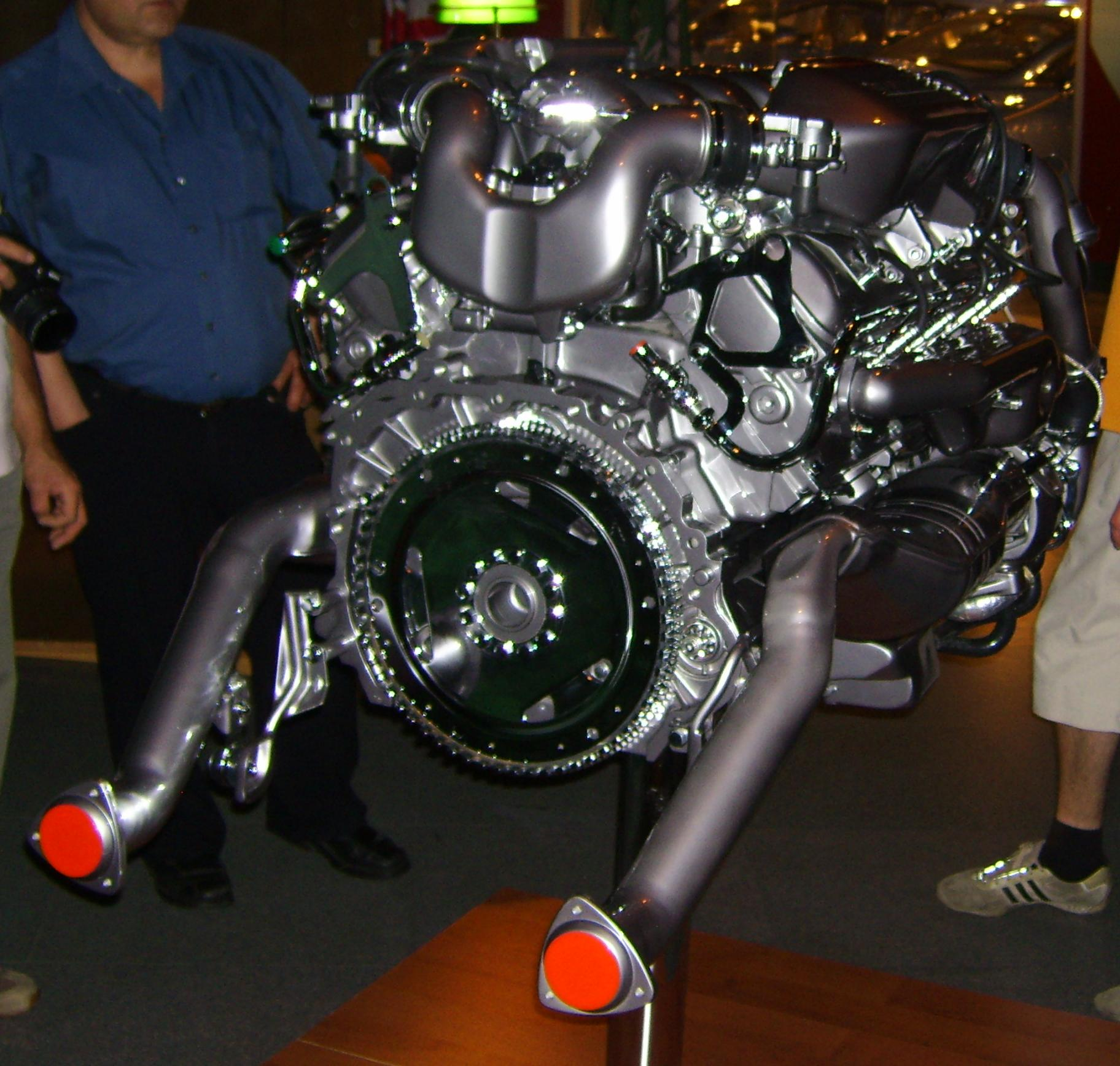
Mid-2000s Rolls-Royce–Bentley L-series V8 engine

The first V8 engine produced in the United Kingdom was fitted to the 1905 Rolls-Royce, of which three cars were made. This engine used a side valve design, a V-angle of 90 degrees, and had a displacement of 3.5 L (214 cu in).

Mass-production of V8 engines began in 1959 with the release of the Rolls-Royce–Bentley L-series V8 engine in the Rolls-Royce Silver Cloud II, the Rolls-Royce Phantom IV, and the Bentley S2. This engine is an all-aluminium construction with a pushrod valvetrain and a V-angle of 90 degrees. It has been produced in displacements of 5.2–7.4 L (317–452 cu in), with a twin-turbocharged version introduced in 1985. The L-series V8 engine remains in production in the Bentley Mulsanne luxury sedan.

===== Rover =====
Rover began production of automotive V8 engines in 1967 with the Rover V8 engine. This engine used the design and tooling of the Buick V8 engine purchased from General Motors. The Rover V8 is an all-aluminium construction with a pushrod valvetrain, displacements of 4–5 L (215–305 cu in) and a V-angle of 90 degrees. Rover, Land Rover, and MG used it in various automobiles.

Production continued until 2006, when it was largely replaced by the Jaguar AJ-V8 engine.

===== Other U.K. manufacturers =====
The Daimler V8 engine was introduced in the 1959 Daimler SP250 sports car and was produced until 1969. This engine has an iron block, an alloy cylinder head, and a pushrod drivetrain that was built in displacements of 2.5–4.5 L (153–275 cu in).

The Jaguar AJ-V8 engine— Jaguar's first V8 engine for road cars— has been in production since 1996. This engine is an all-aluminium construction with double overhead camshafts. It has been produced in both naturally aspirated and supercharged configurations.

Land Rovers have used a variety of V8 engines since 1970 in Discovery and Range Rover marques. For petrol engines, they featured the Rover V8 engine from 1970 to 2004, the BMW M62 from 2002 to 2005 in Range Rover only, the Jaguar AJ-V8 engine (in both naturally aspirated and supercharged versions) from 2005 to now, and the BMW N63 and S63 twin-turbo V8s starting in 2022. For diesel engines, they used the Ford AJD-V6/PSA DT17 (3.6 TDV8) from 2006 to 2009, and have continued with the Ford 4.4 Turbo Diesel (TDV8/SDV8) from 2010 to 2022.

The 1970–1977 Triumph V8 was used solely for the Triumph Stag coupe. This engine had a cast-iron block, an aluminium cylinder head, single overhead camshafts, and a displacement of 3.0 L (183 cu in).

The 1996–2003 TVR Speed Eight engine was used in the Cerbera road cars and the Tuscan Challenge racing cars. This engine had an all-aluminium construction, single overhead camshafts, a flat-plane crankshaft, and an unusual V-angle of 75 degrees.

==== United States ====
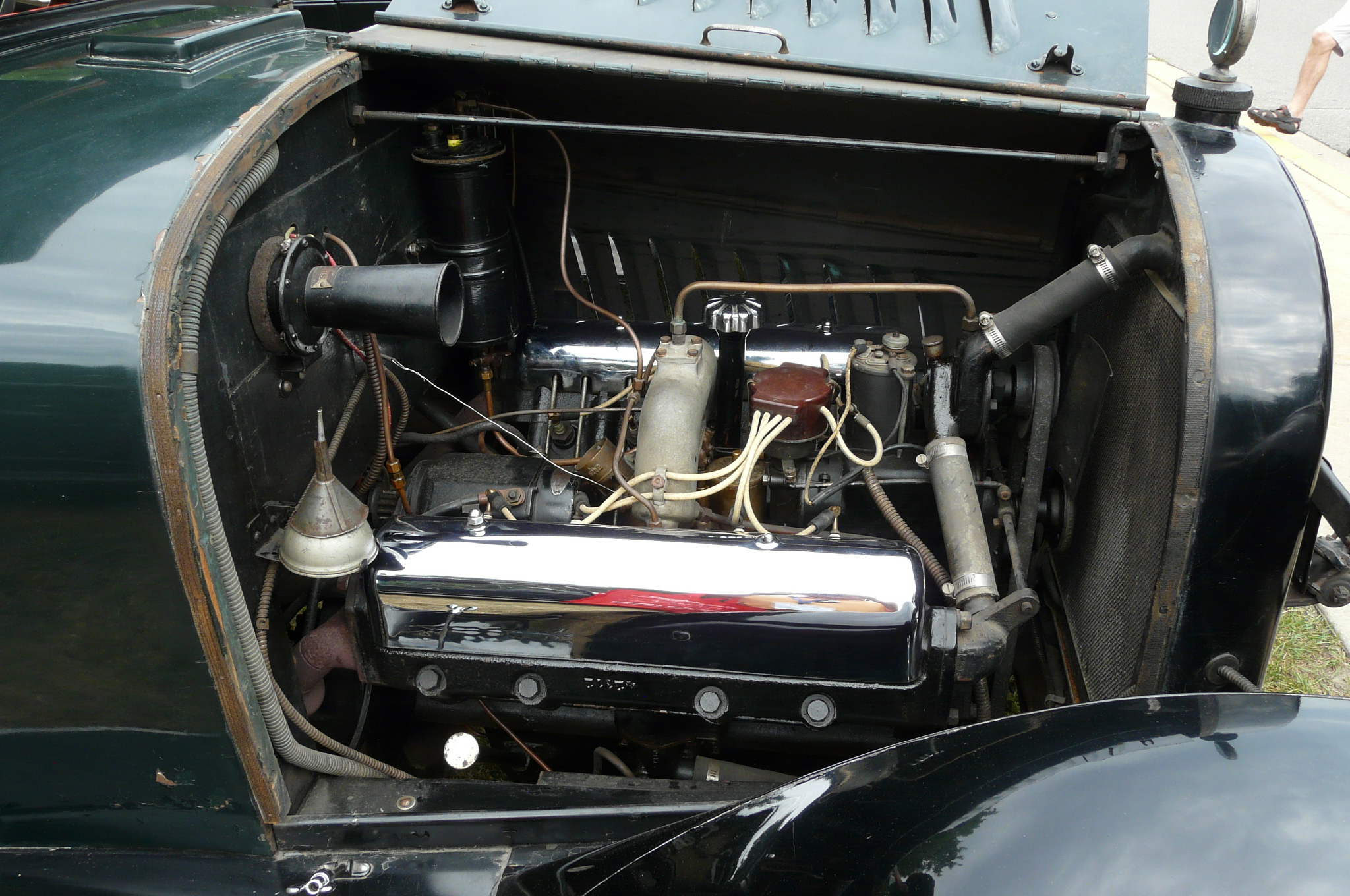
1917–1918 Chevrolet Series D engine

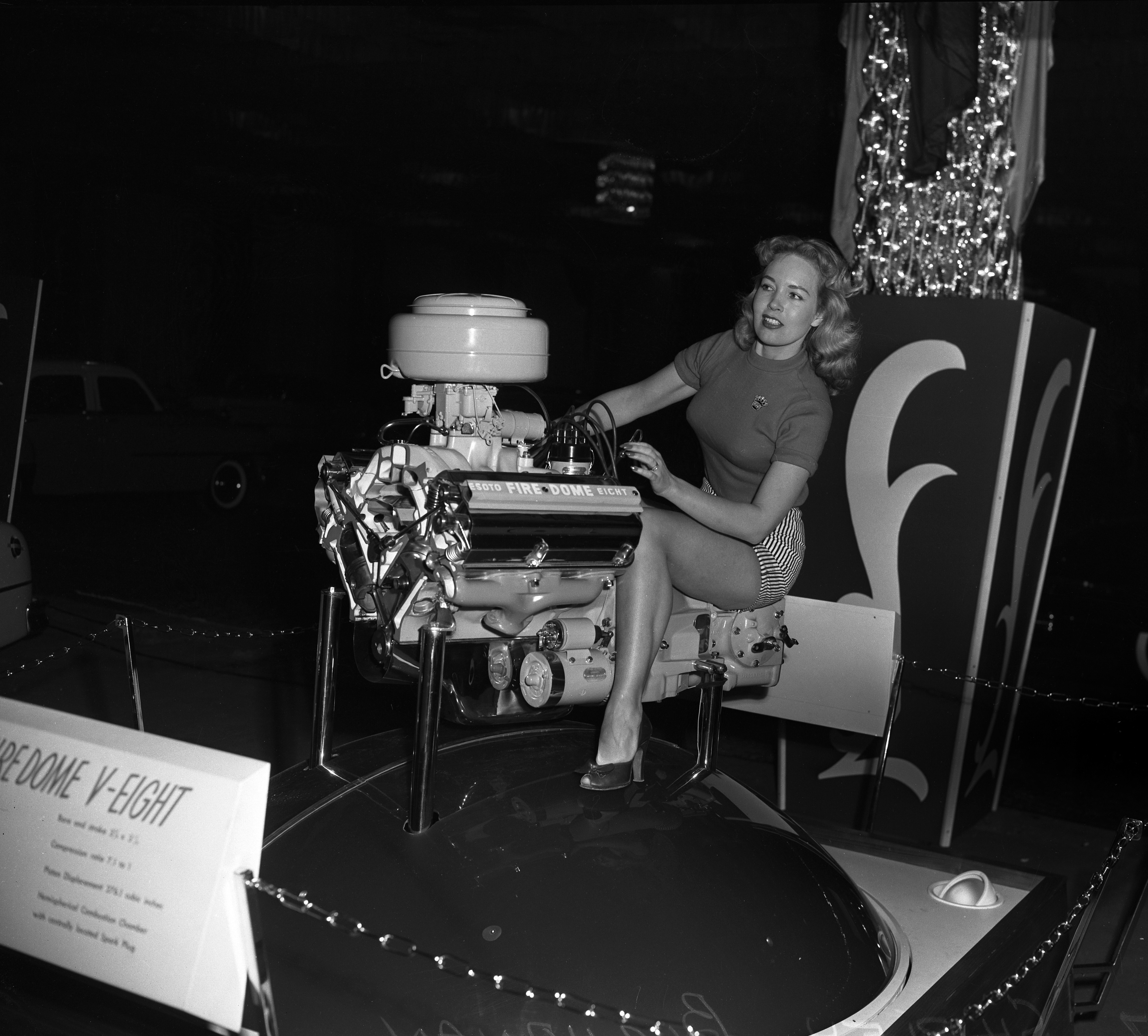
1952–1954 De Soto Fire Dome engine

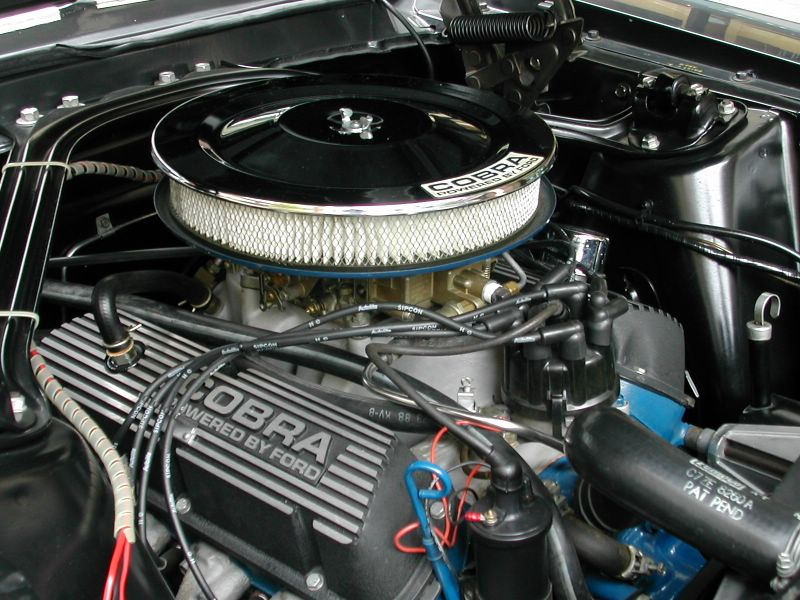
1965–1967 Ford 289 HiPo engine

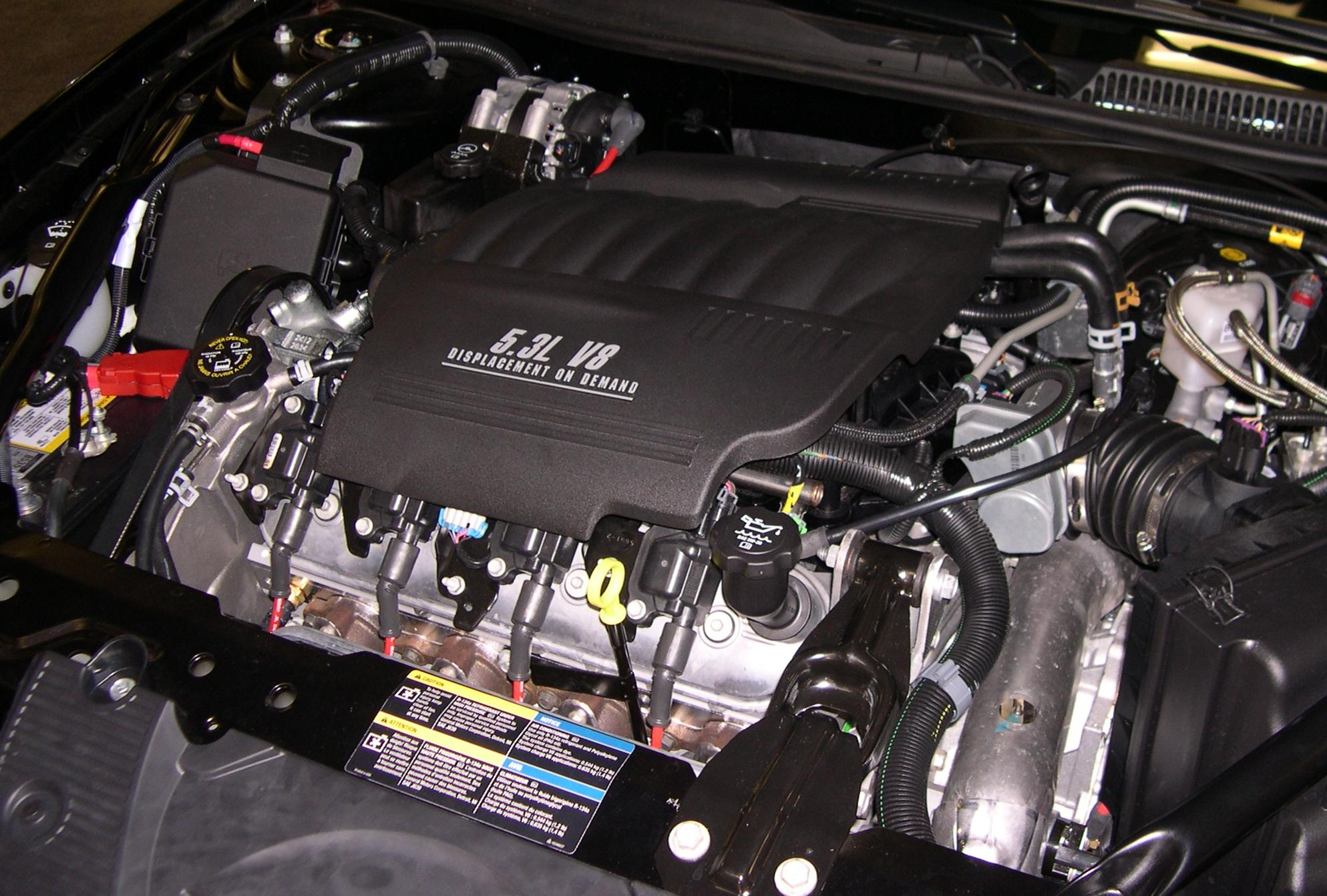
2006 Chevrolet LS4 engine

The first automotive V8 engine to reach production was the 1914–1935 Cadillac L-Head engine introduced in the Type 51 model. The L-head had an alloy crankcase, a single iron casting for each cylinder block and head, side valves, a flat-plane crankshaft and a displacement of 5.1 L (314 cu in). An electric starter motor was used, eliminating the large engines being difficult to start with hand-cranking.

The Cadillac engine was followed by a V8 model from Peerless (using an engine manufactured by an amusement park manufacturer) in 1915.

The first American V8 production engine with overhead valves (a 'pushrod' engine) was used by the 1917 Chevrolet Series D. This engine used a counterweighted crankshaft, a detachable crossflow cylinder head, and had a displacement of 4.7 L (288 cu in). Production of the Series D models ended in 1918.

The 1924 Cadillac Type V-63 was powered by the first American V8 to use a cross-plane crankshaft, which reduced vibrations. A year later, Peerless also introduced a cross-plane crankshaft V8. Other manufacturers producing V8 engines by the mid-1920s included Lincoln, Ferro, Northway (supplier to Cadillac), Cole (Indianapolis and Mississippi), Perkins (Detroit), Murray, Vernon, and Yale.

A significant development in providing V8 engines in more affordable cars was the 1932 through 1954 Ford Flathead V8. The Flathead V8 reduced production costs by using a monobloc (or "en bloc") construction, where each cylinder bank is made from a single piece of cast metal. The engine was fitted to the low-cost Ford Model 18 car, offering superior performance to its competitors.

Demand for larger cars increased in the years following World War II, and the wider bodies were well suited to the fitment of V8 engines. This led to many manufacturers introducing overhead valve V8 engines, such as the 1949–1964 Oldsmobile Rocket engine, the 1949–1962 Cadillac 331 engine, the 1951–1958 Chrysler Firepower engine, the Studebaker's 1952 V8 engine, the 1953–1966 Buick Nailhead engine, the 1954–2002 Chevrolet small-block engine, the 1954–1963 Lincoln Y-block V8 engine, the 1955–1981 Pontiac V8 engine, and the 1956–1967 AMC Rambler engine.

Engine displacements grew with the expanding size of full-size cars through the 1950s to mid-1970s. This led to 'big-block' engines such as:

- 6.0 L (368 cu in) Lincoln Y-block engine released in 1955 for the 1956 model year
- 6.9 L (421 cu in) Pontiac Super Duty engine released in 1960 for the 1961 model year
- 7.0 L (426 cu in) Chrysler Hemi engine released in 1964 for the 1965 model year
- 7.0 L (428 cu in) Ford FE engine released in 1965 for the 1966 model year
- 7.4 L (454 cu in) Chevrolet big-block engine released in 1969 for the 1970 model year.

Big-block engines reached their zenith with the 8.2 L (500 cu in) Cadillac 500 engine used in the 1970 Cadillac Eldorado coupe. During the 1970s, due to the oil crises and the gradual tightening of emission standards, big-block V8s were affected. As a result, their use in passenger cars decreased as manufacturers began to phase them out for more efficient designs.

Before the late 1970s, sharing engines between General Motors' divisions was uncommon. This enabled each division to have its unique engine character but made for much duplication of effort. The company has since implemented the sharing of engines across divisions; however, some divisions (such as Cadillac) still maintain some engines specific to their division. Ford and Chrysler had fewer divisions and favored brand-specific shared designs.

In the United States, eight-cylinder gasoline engines dominated the market before 1980, accounting for a majority of new vehicle production in the mid- to late 1970s. As fuel prices rose, their share declined sharply, falling to roughly one-quarter of sales as manufacturers shifted toward smaller, more fuel-efficient four- and six-cylinder engines. A further decline occurred after 2005, as part of a broader industry shift toward smaller, turbocharged engines to meet fuel economy and emission standards.

In 2011, GM built its 100-millionth unit of the Chevrolet small-block engine, making that engine family the most produced V8 engine in the world.

American manufacturers continue to produce large displacement V8 engines, despite the strategy of downsizing engines (often in conjunction with turbocharging) being adopted by many European and Asian manufacturers. These engines continued to use pushrod (overhead valve) valvetrains long after most overseas engines had switched to dual overhead camshaft designs. Examples include the 6.4 L (392 cu in) Chrysler Apache engine produced from 2011–present, the 7.3 L (445 cu in) Ford Godzilla engine produced from 2020–present, and the 6.6 L (401 cu in) GM L8T engine produced from 2020–present.

American manufacturers have concurrently produced more modern DOHC engines, such as the Chevrolet Gemini small-block engine, Cadillac's turbocharged Cadillac Blackwing V8, and the Ford Modular V8.

==== Vietnam ====
In Vietnam, VinFast used a V8 engine in the full-size SUV VinFast President from December 2020.

== Airplane use ==
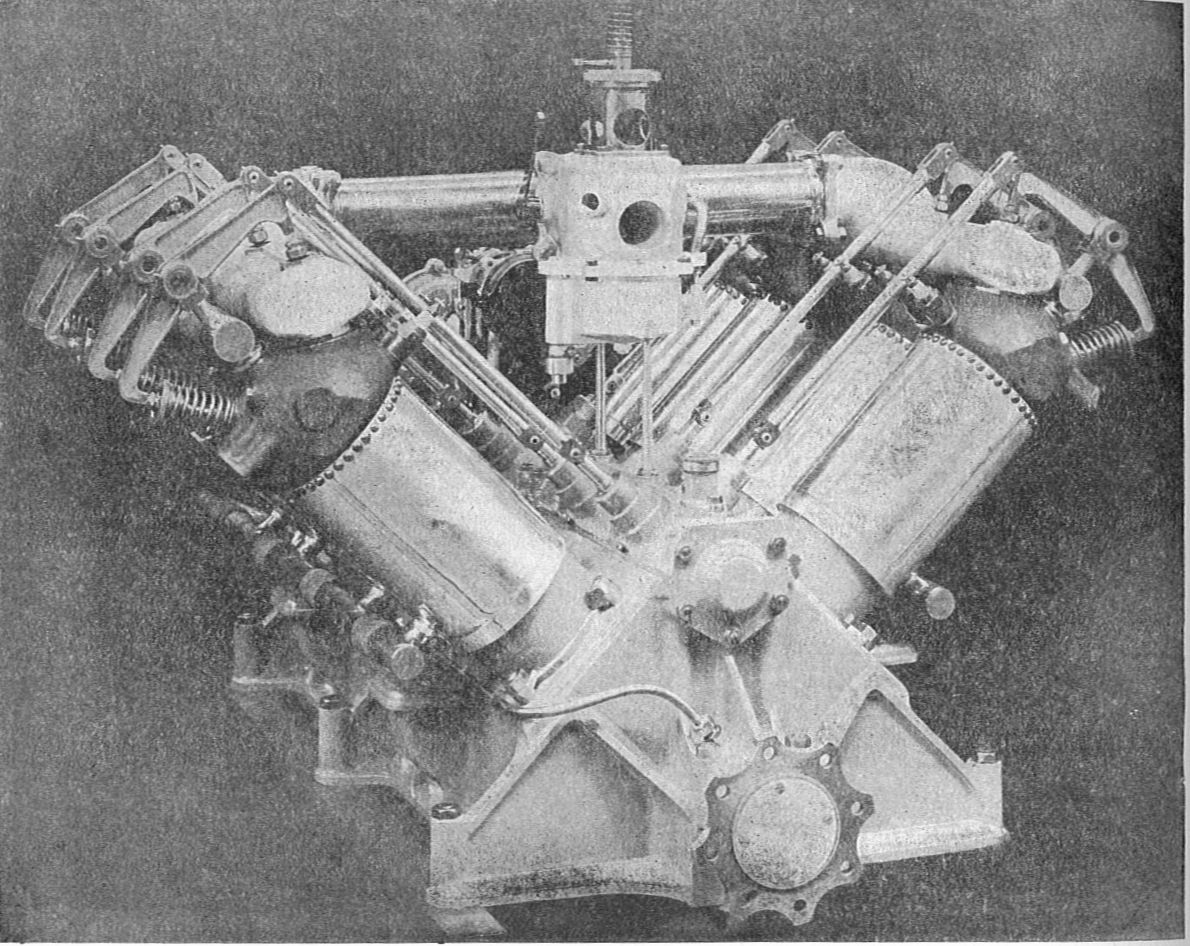
Wolseley 120 hp aircraft engine, c. 1910

Several early aircraft engines used a V8 configuration, such as the French 1904 Antoinette engine and 1906 Buchet engines. The 1905 version of the Antoinette engine produced 37 kW (50 hp) with 86 kg (190 lb) of weight (including cooling water), resulting in a power-to-weight ratio that was not surpassed for 25 years.

Early airplanes continued to use V8 engines. During World War One, V8 aircraft engines included the French Renault 8G, the Spanish Hispano-Suiza 8, the British Sunbeam Arab, and the American Curtiss OX-5.

The 1915 Hispano-Suiza 8 SOHC engine was designed by Marc Birkigt from Switzerland and was built by Hispano-Suiza in France and Spain as well as under license in England and the United States. This engine was used by American, French, and British military aircraft in World War One. It was one of the most important engines with most of the leading aces piloting aircraft powered by this dependable, flexible-performance, as well as light and well-balanced Hispano-Suiza 8 engine. By 1922, the versions incorporated improvements by Wright Aeronautical and was considered the lightest and most efficient pursuit engine in the world.

After this time, flat-eight engines became more commonplace than V8 engines due to their lighter crankshafts and better suitability for air cooling. One of the few remaining V8 airplane engines by World War Two was the German Argus As 10 inverted V8, which was air-cooled and used in several trainers and small utility aircraft.

== Marine vessel use ==
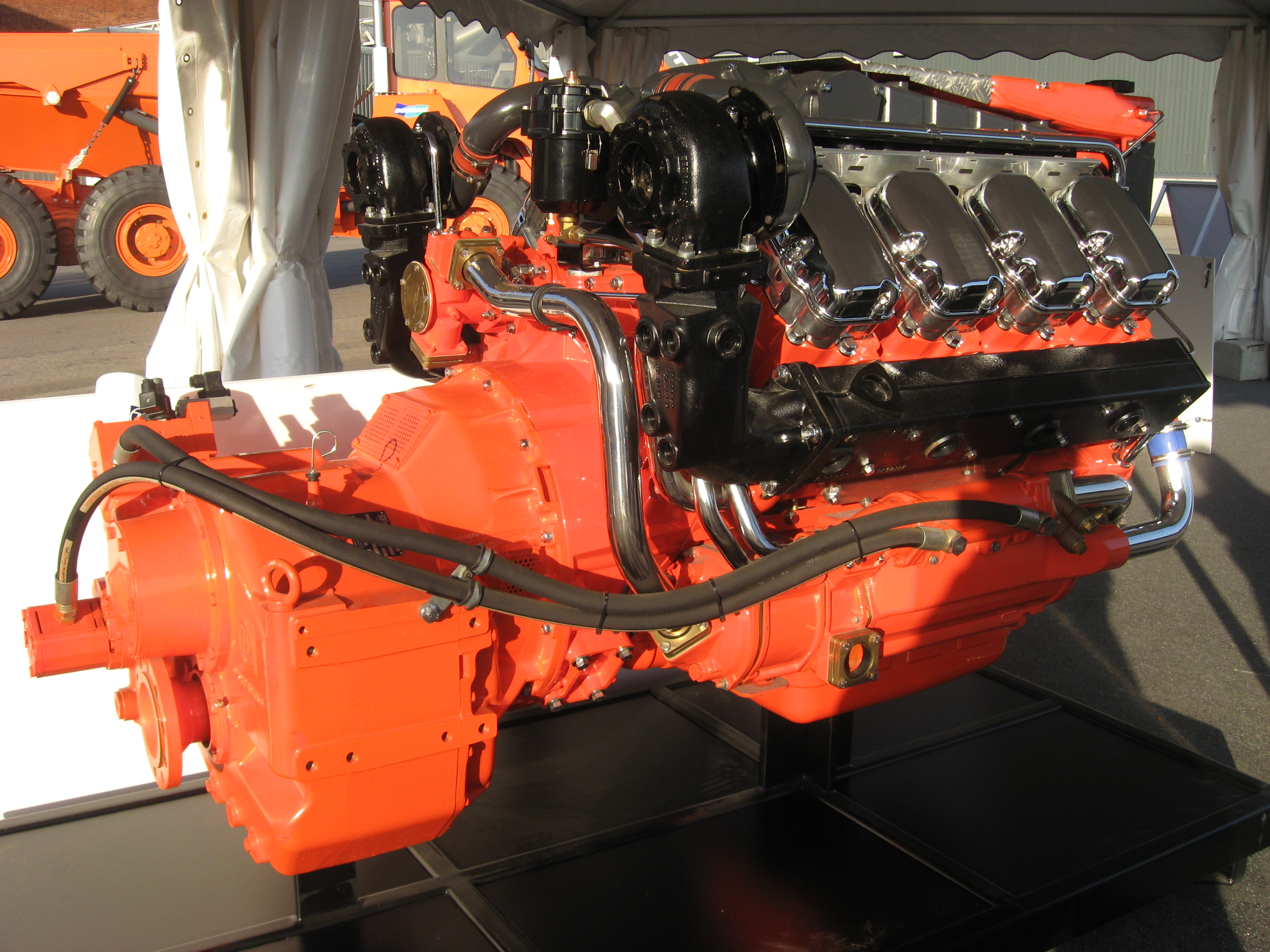
Scania AB marine/truck engine

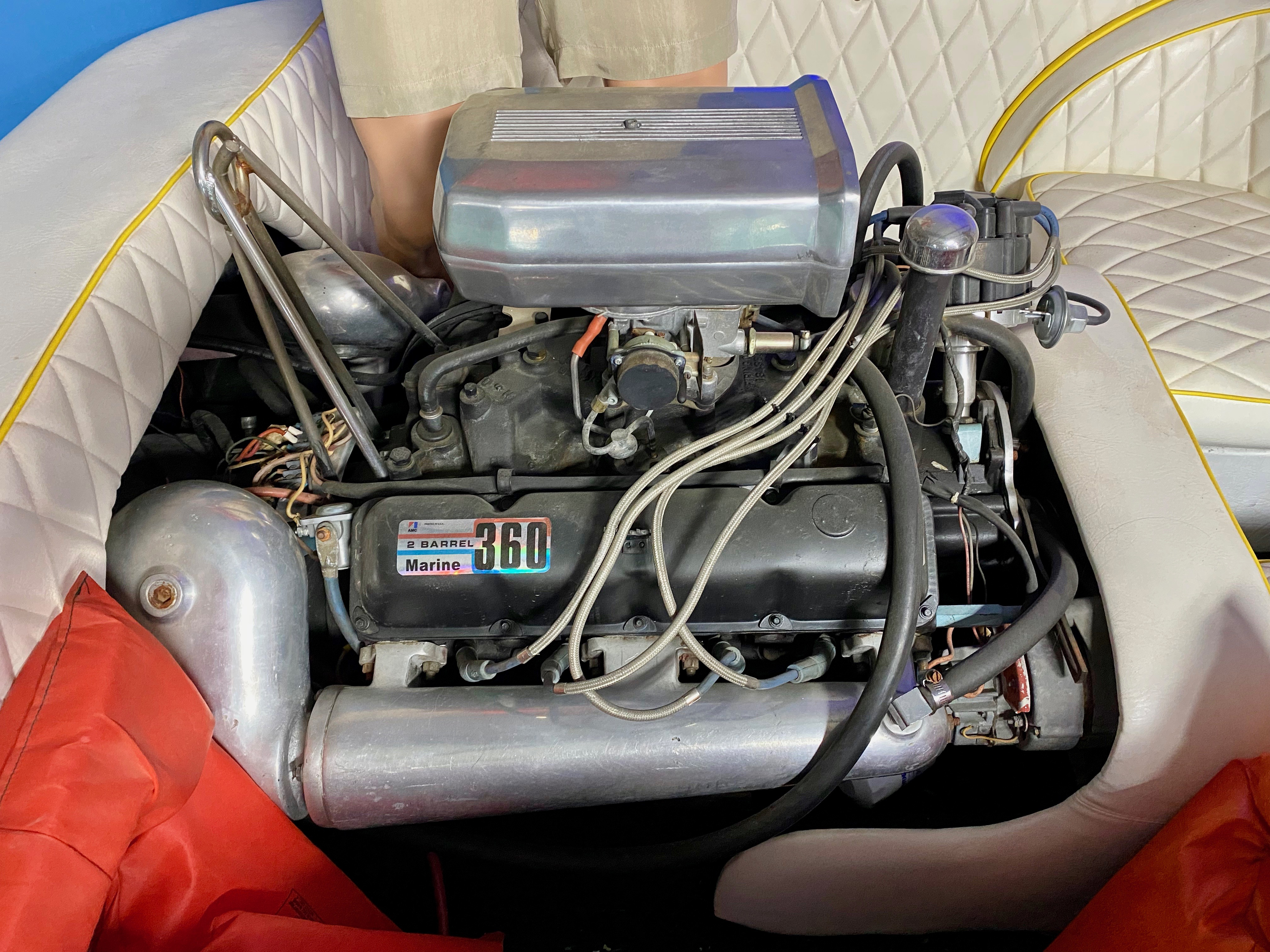
360 cu in (5.9 L) AMC V8 with tow ring for water skiing

The V8 configuration is not commonly used in marine vessels. Nevertheless, the arrangement provides for a short engine that is also well-balanced for high-speed work. In addition to gasoline fuel, several marine diesel V8 engines have been produced by companies such as Brons, Scania, and Yanmar.

Gray Marine Motor Company was one of the first to use petrol V8 engines for marine use. Engines from American Motors Corporation (AMC) were utilized by Gray Marine from 1957 until 1968. They were marketed as "Fireball" inboards and available in 4.1, 4.7, and 5.4 L (250, 287, and 327 cu in) versions. They used a variety of carburetor combinations, including single and dual Carter one barrel YH side-drafts, Carter two-barrel, and Carter AFB/AVS four-barrel types. The engine is mostly the same as for automobile applications, with changes to freeze plugs and cam profiles (to reduce top rpm), and well as positive displacement pump to cool each cylinder bank separately and evenly. Reverse rotation allowed for use in twin-engine boats. The "Fireball" engines often powered Century motor yachts and many Lyman boats. In the 1970s, AMC's 5.9, 6.4, and 6.6 L (360, 390, and 401 cu in) V8 engines were also available as marine versions, with most fitted to jet drive boats for water skiing.

Wärtsilä 31, a four-stroke medium-speed diesel engine manufactured by Wärtsilä, is one of the few large marine diesel engines available in V8 configuration. The 8V31 model, which has a cylinder bore of 31 centimetres (12 in), is available as diesel (8V31), dual-fuel (8V31DF), and pure gas (8V31SG) configurations with an output of 4,400 to 4,880 kilowatts (5,900 to 6,540 hp) depending on the model.

== Motorcycle use ==
Until Boss Hoss Cycles began production in 1990, the few V8 motorcycles made were either prototypes or racing machines.

In 1907, Glen Curtiss set an unofficial world record of 136.36 mph (219.45 km/h) on a home-made 4.0 L (244 cu in) motorcycle. The Moto Guzzi V8 was a 499 cc (30.5 cu in) motorcycle capable of 275 km/h (171 mph) used for Grand Prix racing from 1955 until 1957. The 1994 Morbidelli V8 was an 848 cc (51.7 cu in) concept motorcycle which did not reach production. As of 2006, Boss Hoss had sold over 4,000 bikes and trikes with Chevrolet V8 car engines.

== See also ==
- Flat-eight engine
- Straight-eight engine
- W8 engine
