= Lancia Dilambda =

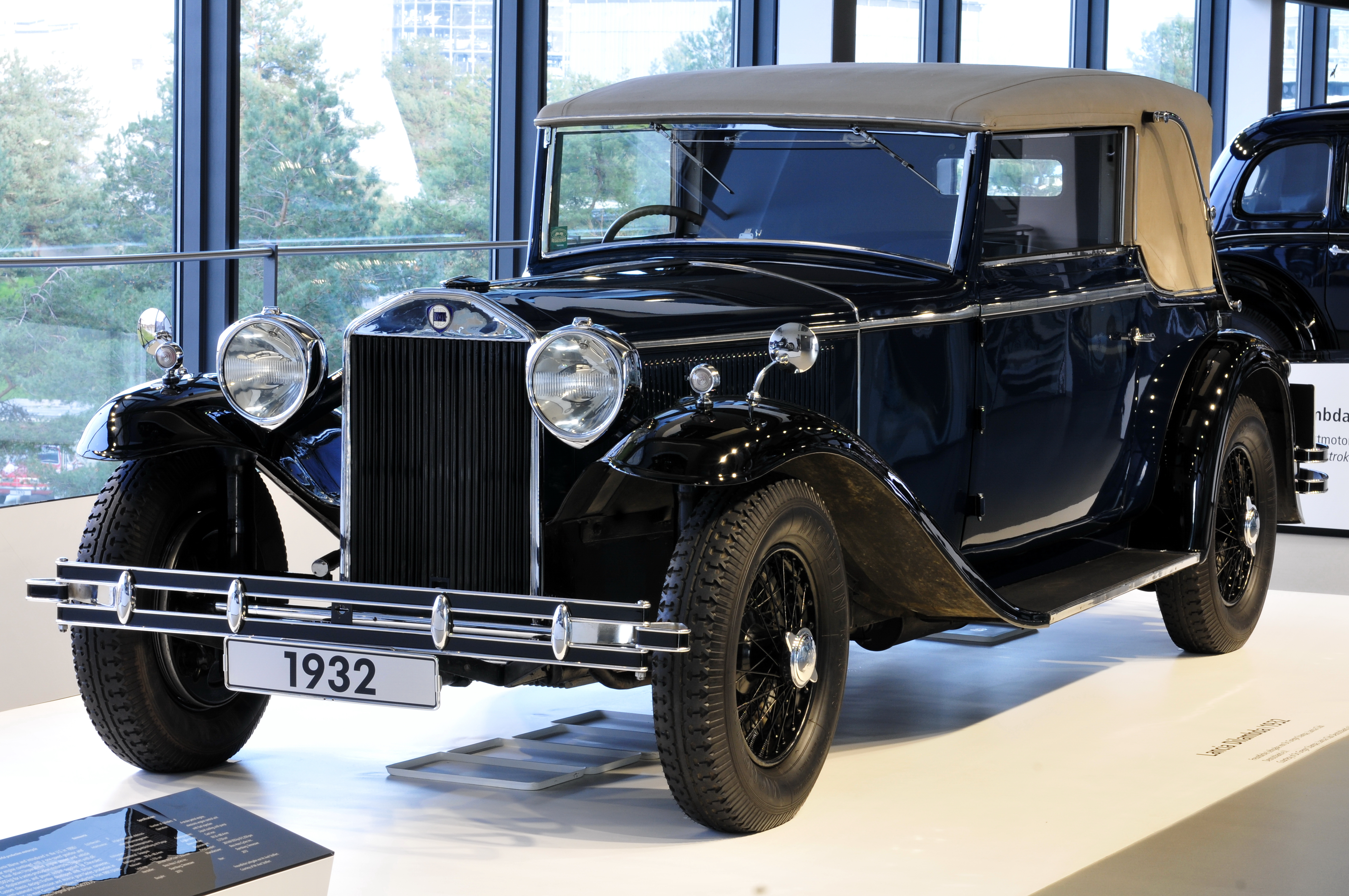
- 1932 Lancia Dilambda

Overview
- Manufacturer: Lancia
- Production: 1928–1935

Body and chassis
- Body style: Torpedo; 4-door sedan
- Layout: FR layout

Powertrain
- Engine: 3958 cc V8 100 hp
- Transmission: 4-speed manual gearbox

Dimensions
- Wheelbase: 329 cm (129.5 in) (S.1-S.2); 348 cm (137.0 in) (S.1-S.3)
- Curb weight: 2,100 kg (4,630 lb)

Chronology
- Predecessor: Lancia Trikappa
- Successor: Lancia Astura

The Lancia Dilambda is a passenger car produced by Lancia between 1928 and 1935. The car was officially presented at the Paris Motor Show in 1929, and was powered by a 4 litre V8 engine with a 24 degree "V" angle.

Three versions of the Dilambda were built:

- First series, produced between 1928 and 1931, total 1,104 built.
- Second series, produced between 1931 and 1933, total 300 built. Modified gearbox and brakes.
- Third series, produced between 1933 and 1935, total 281 built. Modified chassis for more aerodynamic style, it was built only with long wheelbase.
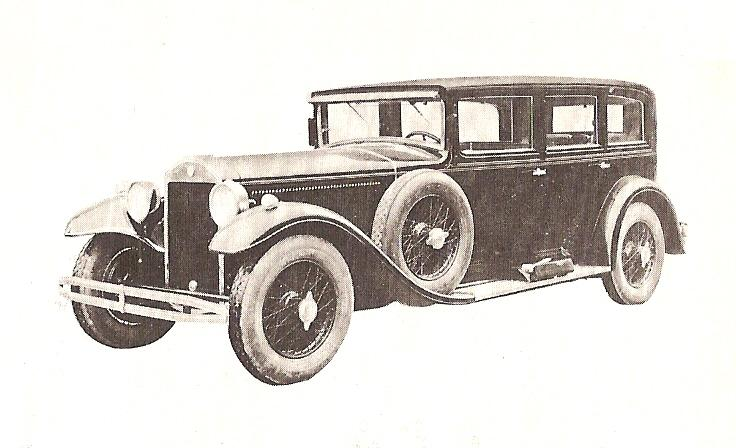
Lancia Dilambda Berlina

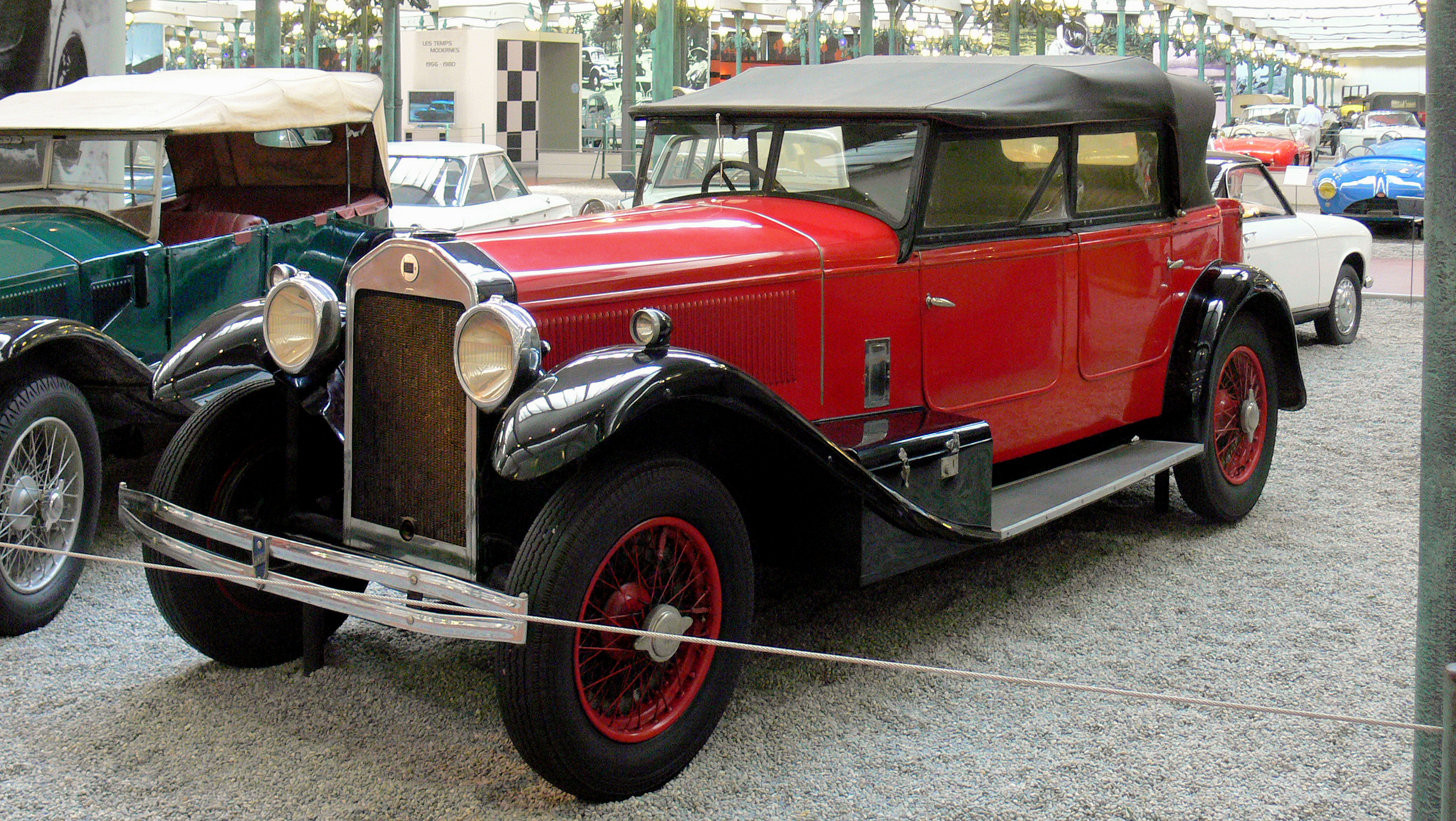
First series Lancia Dilambda

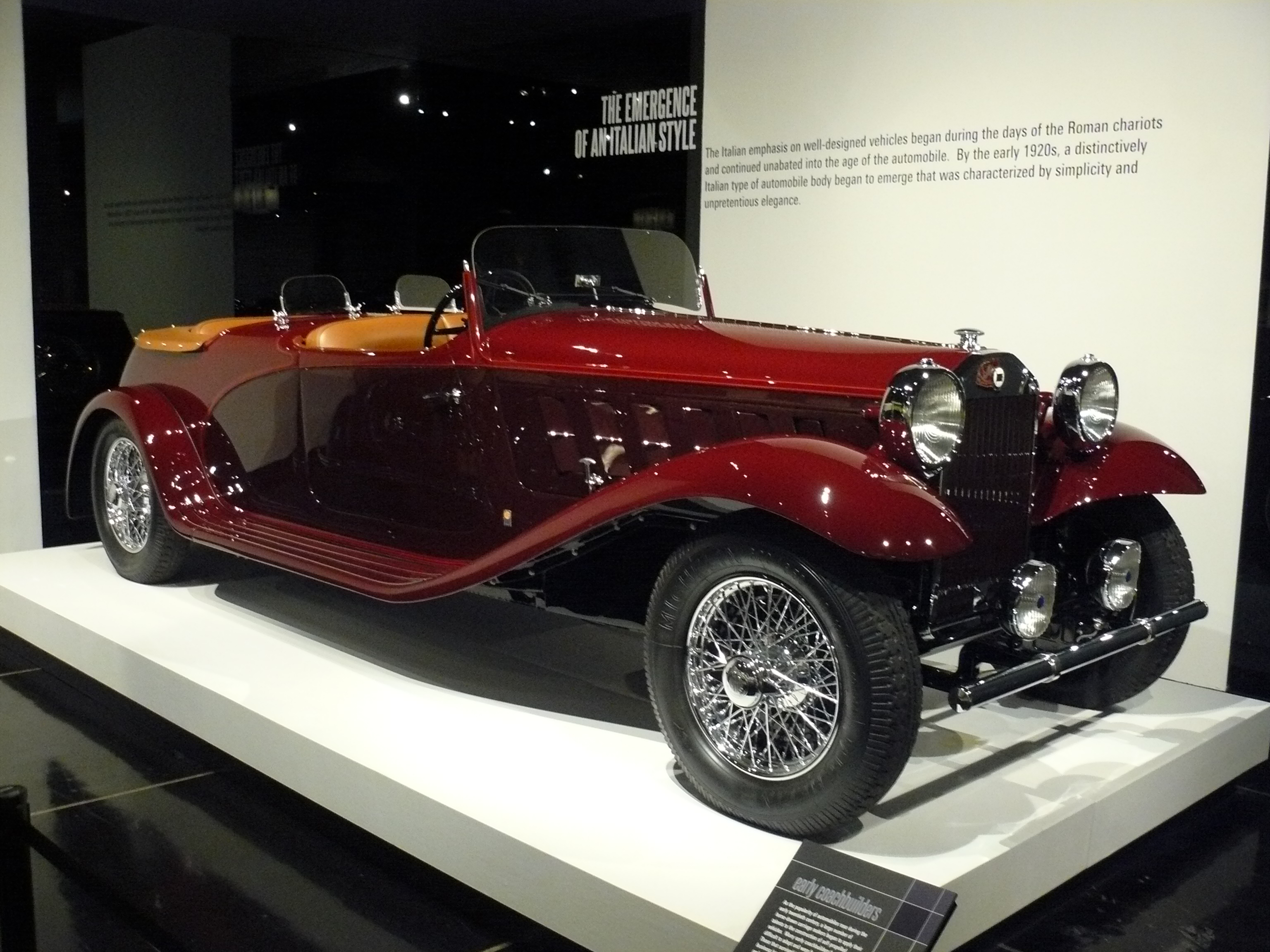
Second series Lancia Dilambda with Viotti body
