= Strada statale 44 bis Passo del Rombo =

State highway in Italy

State Highway 44bis
- Strada statale 44bis
- Passo del Rombo

Route information
- Maintained by ANAS
- Length: 29.51 km (18.34 mi)
- Existed: 1960–present

Major junctions
- From: San Leonardo in Passiria
- To: Rombo Pass

Location
- Country: Italy
- Regions: Trentino-Alto Adige/Südtirol

Highway system
- Roads in Italy; Autostrade; State; Regional; Provincial; Municipal
← SS 44	→ SS 45

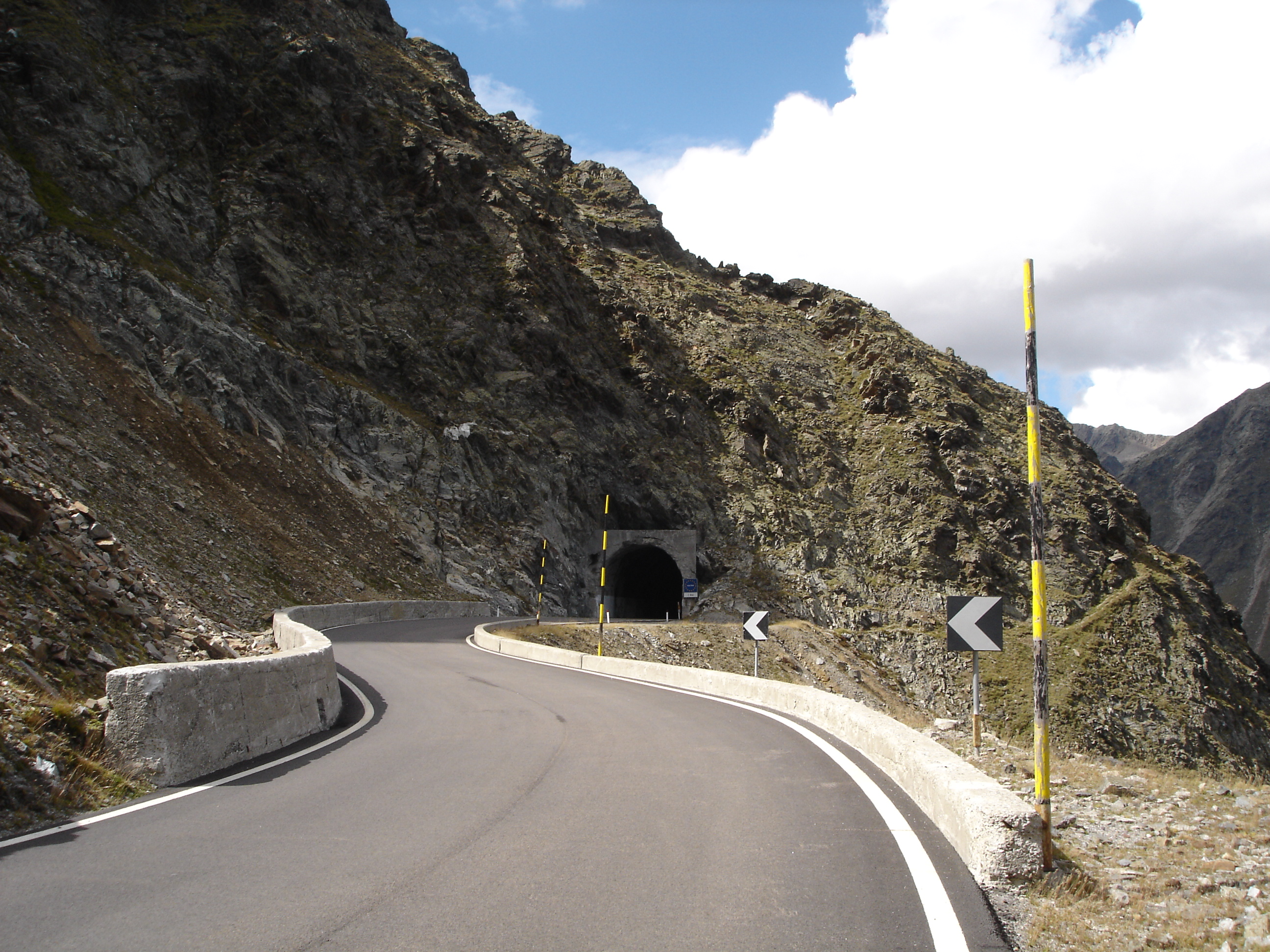
Strada statale 44 bis at Rombo Pass

Strada statale 44 bis Passo del Rombo (SS 44 bis) is an Italian state highway 29.51 kilometres (18.34 mi) long in Italy located in the region of Trentino-Alto Adige/Südtirol that connects Passiria with Austria.

It originates in San Leonardo in Passiria from Strada statale 44 del Passo di Giovo and ends at the Austria–Italy border, then continuing on the Austrian side with the Ötztalstraße. The road, detached from the SS 44 del Passo di Giovo, continues to climb the Passiria passing through Moso in Passiria and reaches the Austrian border after just under 30 kilometres (19 mi) at the 2,474 metres (8,117 ft) of Rombo Pass, while the other state road deviates to go up a lateral valley towards Monte Giovo Pass.

== History ==
The SS 44 bis originates from a military road that was built under Benito Mussolini from 1933 up to two kilometers from the pass, in order to be used for an offensive against Austria in the event of a war. Its construction was stopped after Mussolini and Hitler had concluded the Berlin-Rome axis. The plan to build a road over the Timmelsjoch was taken up by Austria soon after the Second World War. It was significantly advanced by the then regional councilor and later governor Eduard Wallnöfer, himself a native of South Tyrol. In 1959, the pass road was opened on the Austrian side. On September 15, 1968, the road connection, now designated as the public SS 44 bis, was officially opened on the Italian side.

== See also ==
- State highways (Italy)
- Roads in Italy
- Transport in Italy

=== Other Italian roads ===
- Autostrade of Italy
- Regional road (Italy)
- Provincial road (Italy)
- Municipal road (Italy)
