= State highway =

State-maintained and numbered road

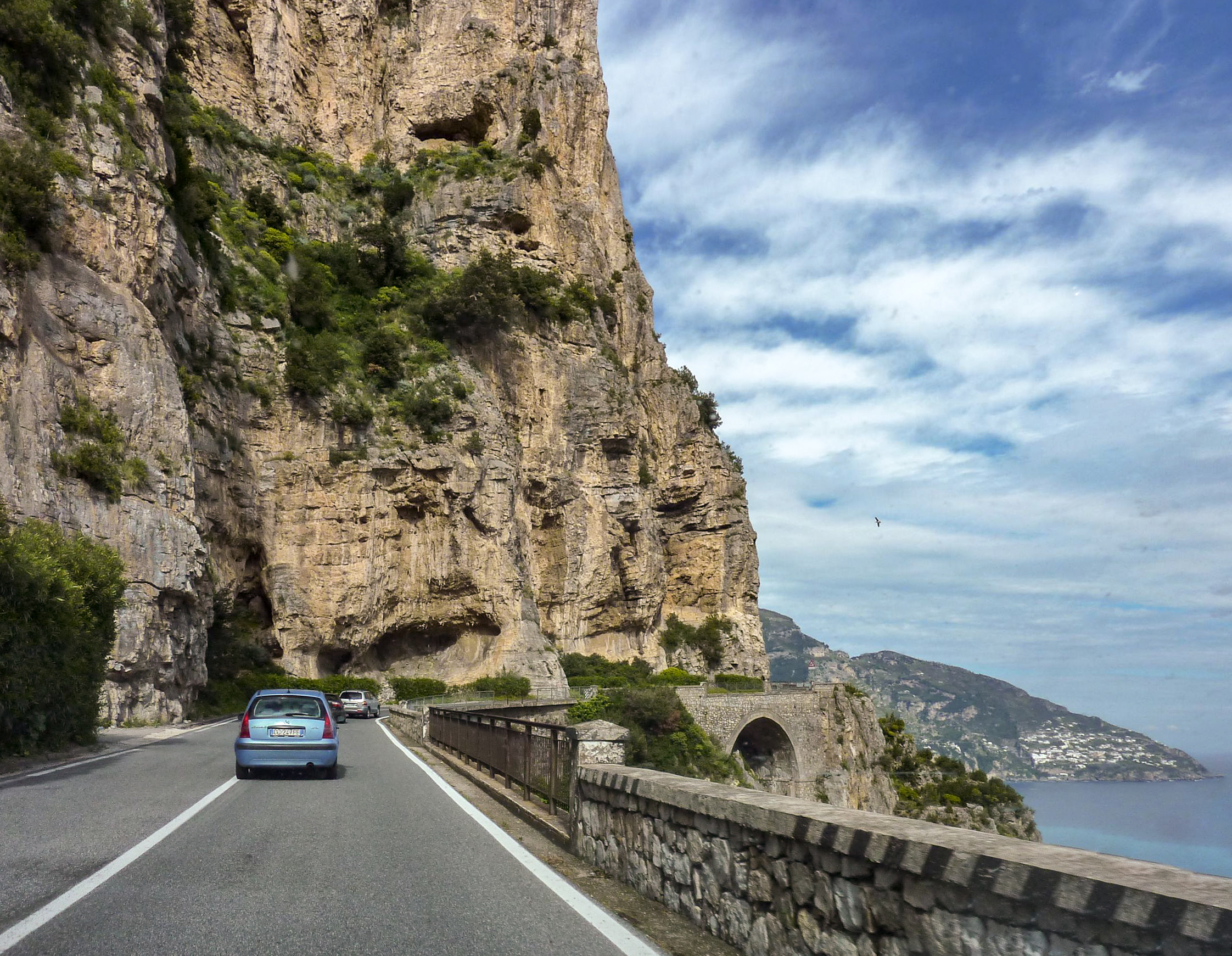
Strada statale 163 Amalfitana in Italy, which runs along the stretch of the Amalfi Coast between the southern Italian towns of Sorrento and Amalfi.

A state highway, state road, or state route (and the equivalent provincial highway, provincial road, or provincial route) is usually a road that is either numbered or maintained by a sub-national state or province. A road numbered by a state or province falls below numbered national highways (Canada being a notable exception to this rule) in the hierarchy (route numbers are used to aid navigation, and may or may not indicate ownership or maintenance).

Roads maintained by a state or province include both nationally numbered highways and un-numbered state highways. Depending on the state, "state highway" may be used for one meaning and "state road" or "state route" for the other.

In some countries such as New Zealand, the word "state" is used in its sense of a sovereign state or country. By this meaning a state highway is a road maintained and numbered by the national government rather than local authorities.

== By country ==
=== Australia ===
Australian State Route 3 marker

Australia's important urban and inter-regional routes not covered by the National Highway or National Route systems are marked under the State Route system. They can be recognised by blue shield markers. They were practically adopted in all states by the end of the 1980s, and in some states, some less important National Routes were downgraded to State Routes. Each state has or had its own numbering scheme, but do not duplicate National Route numbers in the same state, or nearby routes in another state.

As with the National Routes and National Highways, State Routes are being phased out in most states and territories in favour of alphanumeric routes. However, despite the fact that Victoria has fully adopted alphanumeric routes in regional areas, state route numbers are still used extensively within the city of Melbourne as a part of its Metropolitan Route Numbering Scheme.

Unlike in other Australian states, State Routes in Western Australia carry a large importance by representing major routes across the state, as Western Australia has not adopted the Alphanumeric numbering system.

=== Brazil ===
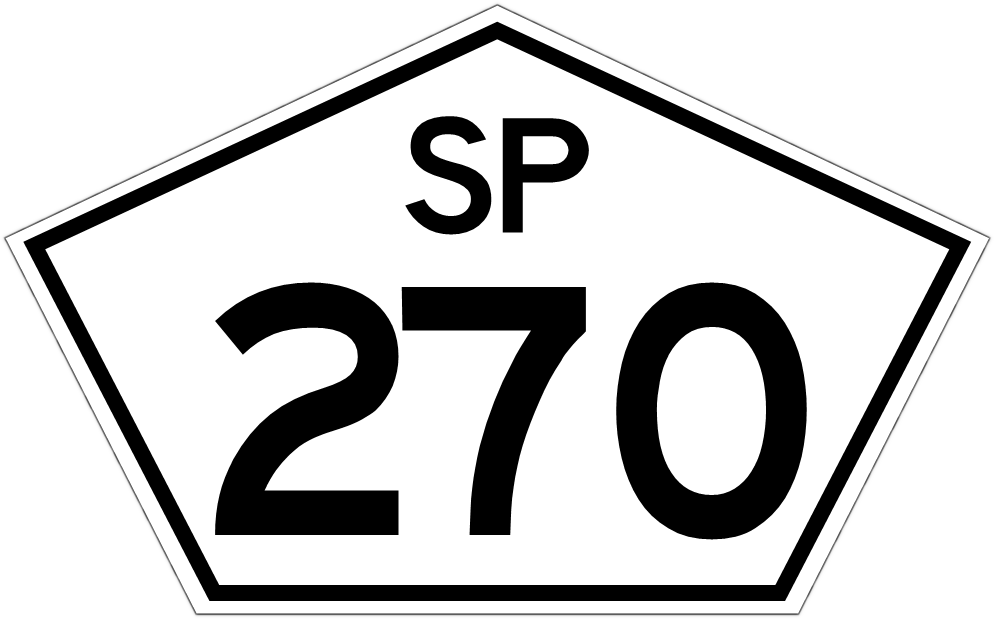
SP-270 state highway shield in the state of São Paulo

Brazil is another country that is divided into states and has state highways. For example, the longest highway in the state of São Paulo, the Rodovia Raposo Tavares, is designated as SP-270 and SP-295.

=== Canada ===
An Ontario provincial highway marker

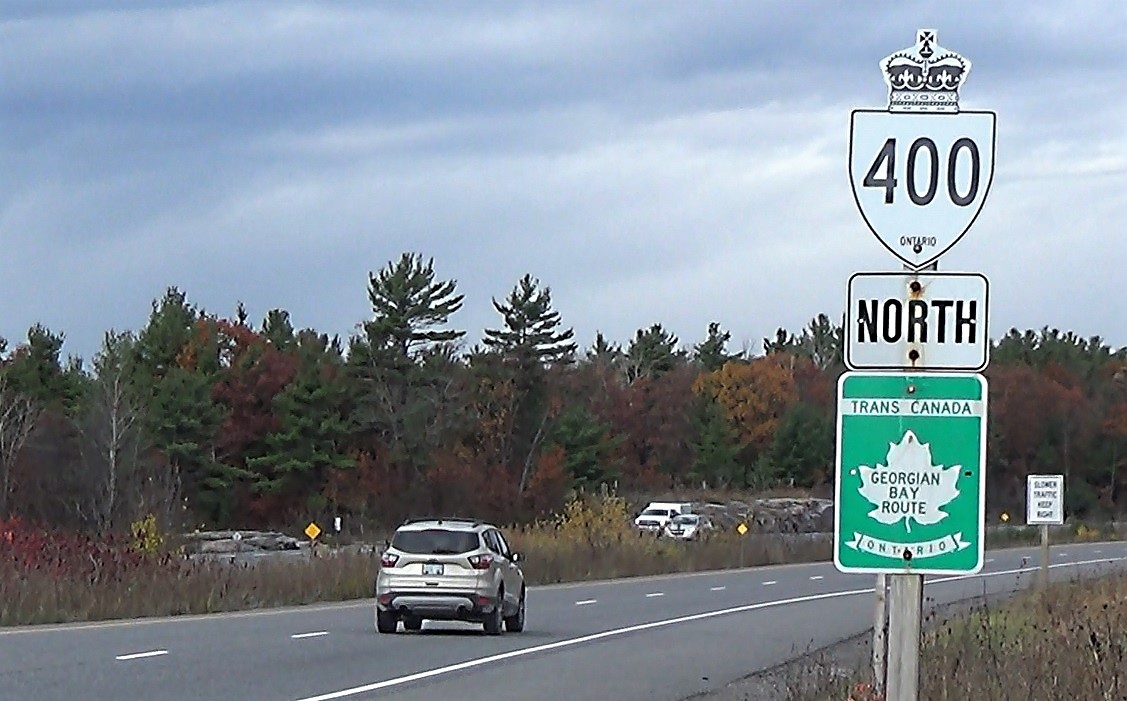
A Canadian provincial highway double-signed with a numberless, but named, national Trans-Canada marker

Canada is divided into provinces and territories, each of which maintains its own system of provincial or territorial highways, which form the majority of the country's highway network. There is also the national transcontinental Trans-Canada Highway system, which is marked by distinct signs, but has no uniform numeric designation across the country. In the eastern provinces, for instance, an unnumbered (though sometimes with a named route branch) Trans-Canada route marker is co-signed with a numbered provincial sign, with the provincial route often continuing alone outside the Trans-Canada Highway section. However, in the western provinces, the two parallel Trans-Canada routes are consistently numbered with Trans-Canada route markers; as Highways 1 and 16 respectively.

Canada also has a designated National Highway System, but the system is completely unsigned, aside from the Trans-Canada routes. This makes Canada unique in that national highway designations are generally secondary to subnational routes.

=== Germany ===
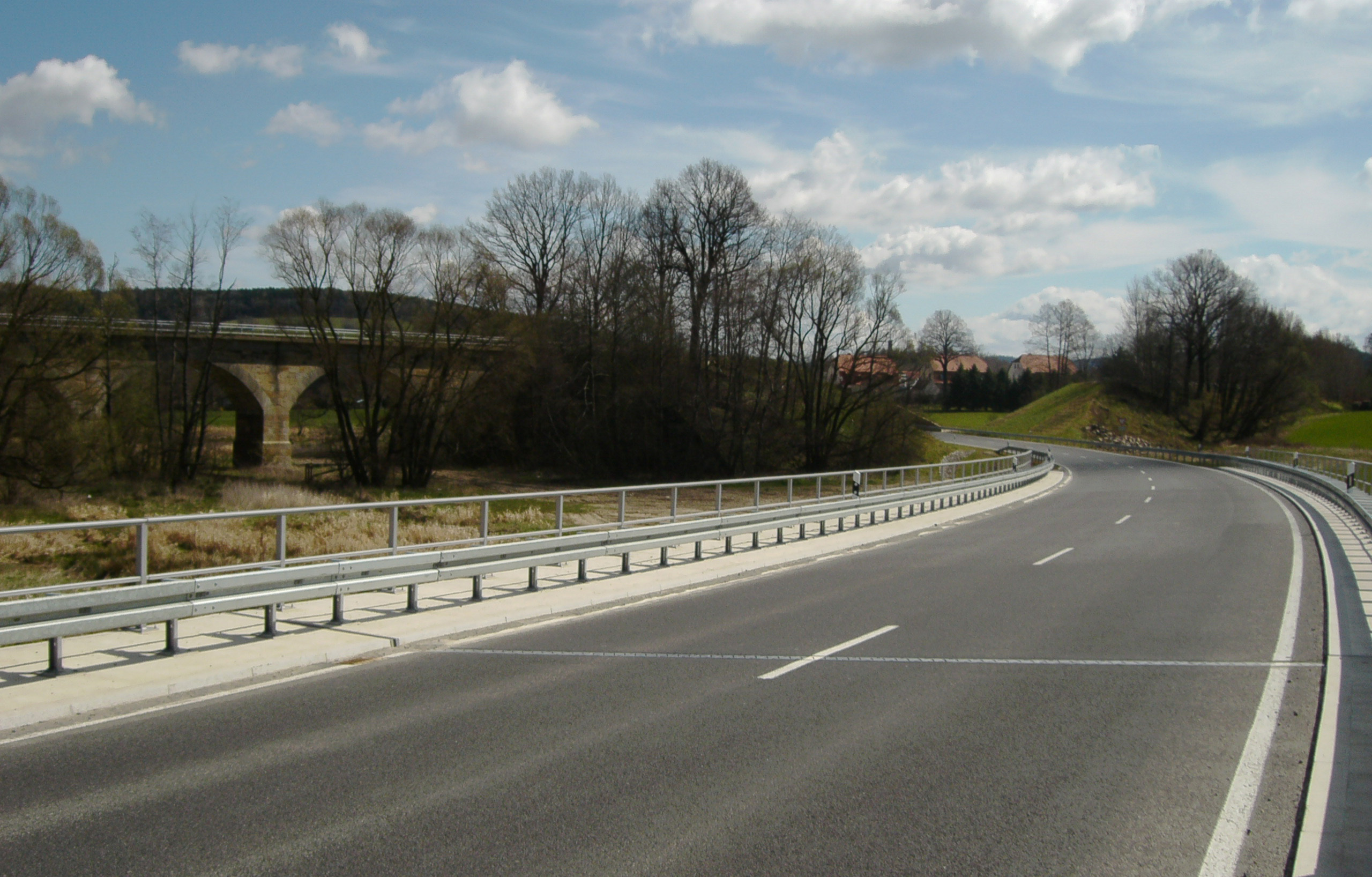
Staatsstrasse 156 in Saxony

In Germany, state roads (Landesstraßen or Staatsstraßen) are a road class which is ranking below the federal road network (Bundesstraßen). The responsibility for road planning, construction and maintenance is vested in the federal states of Germany.

Most federal states use the term Landesstraße (marked with 'L'), while for historical reasons Saxony and Bavaria use the term Staatsstraße (marked with 'S'). The appearance of the shields differs from state to state.

The term Land-es-straße should not be confused with Landstraße, which describes every road outside built-up areas and is not a road class.

=== Italy ===
Road marker for state highways in Italy

The Strade Statali, abbreviated SS, is the Italian national network of state highways. The total length for the network is about 25.000 km (15.534 mi). The Italian state highway network are maintained by ANAS. From 1928 until 1946 state highways were maintained by Azienda Autonoma Statale della Strada (AASS). The next level of roads below Strada Statali is Strada Regionale ("regional roads"). The routes of some state highways derive from ancient Roman roads, such as the Strada statale 7 Via Appia, which broadly follows the route of the Roman road of the same name. Other examples are the Strada statale 1 Via Aurelia (Via Aurelia) and the Strada statale 4 Via Salaria (Via Salaria).

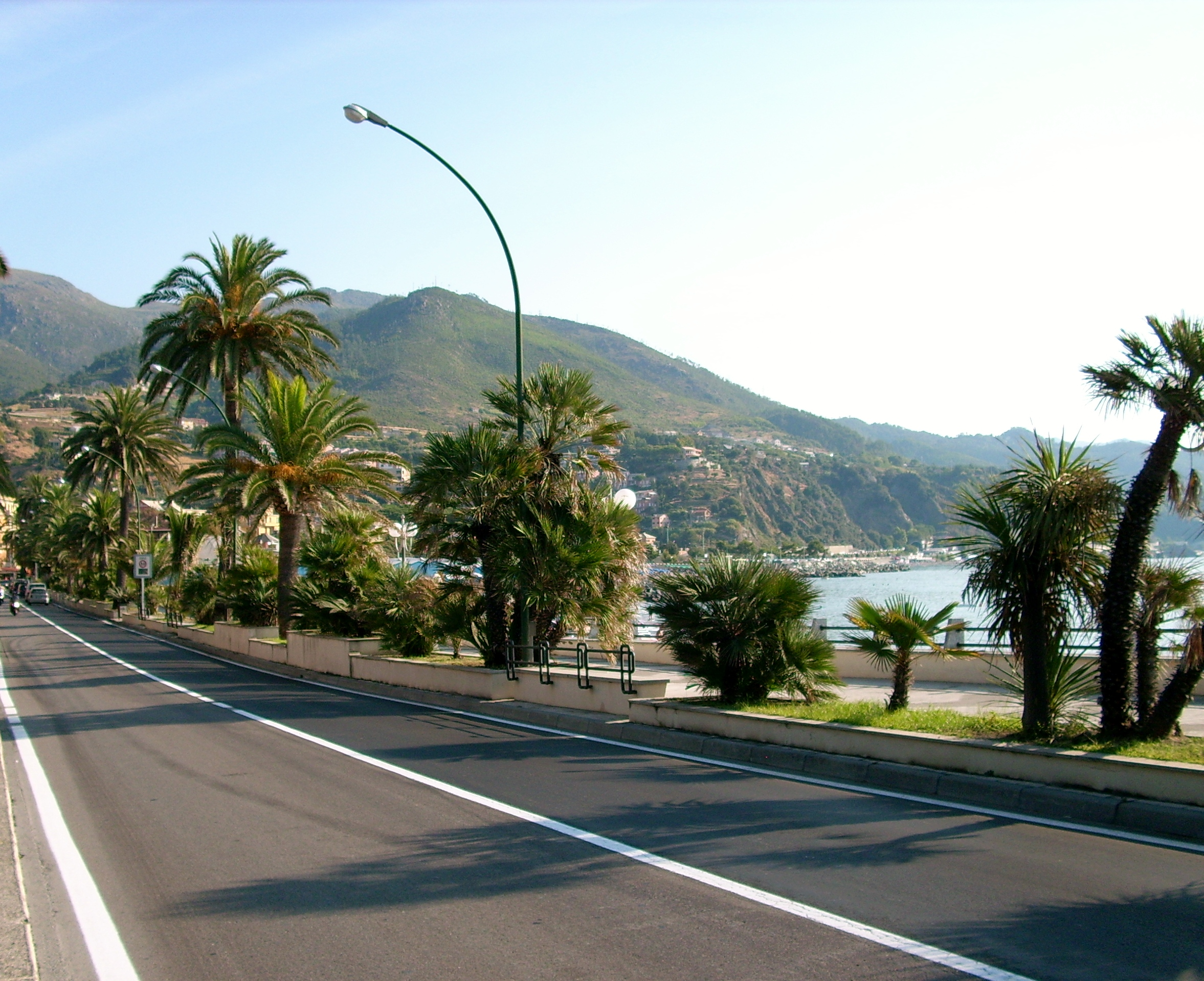
Strada statale 1 Via Aurelia in Arenzano. It is one of the most important state highways in Italy and derives from an ancient Roman consular road, the Via Aurelia.

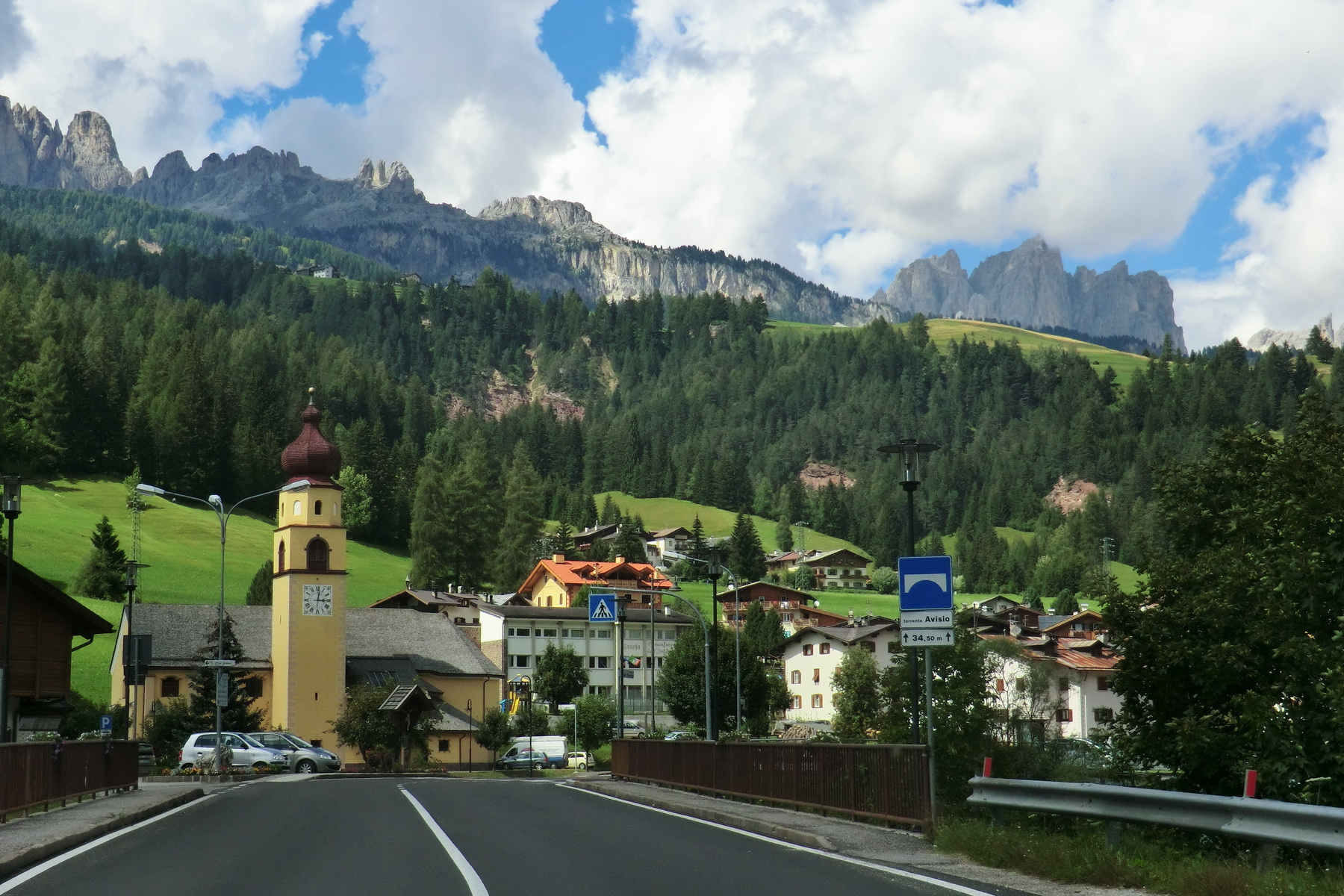
Strada statale 48 delle Dolomiti in Soraga. It is a mountainous road that runs through the Dolomites area from South Tyrol, through Trentino to Cadore.

Since the reforms following the birth of the Kingdom of Italy in 1861, the State took charge of the construction and maintenance of a primary network of roads for connections between the main cities; in 1865 the Lanza law introduced the classification of roads between national, provincial and municipal (see Annex F, art.10) and the Royal Decree of 17 November 1865, n. 2633 listed the first 38 national roads.

Italian state highways are identified by a number and a name. In road signs and maps the number is preceded by the acronym SS, an acronym for strada statale ("state road"). The nomenclature of the state highways managed by ANAS generally follows the SS n scheme, where n is a number ranging from 1 (Aurelia) up to 700 (of the Royal Palace of Caserta) depending on the date of establishment of the state highway. Newly built ANAS roads, not yet classified, are identified by the acronym NSA, an acronym for nuova strada ANAS ("new ANAS road").

State highways can be technically defined as main extra-urban roads (type B road) or as secondary extra-urban roads (type C road). State highways that cross towns with a population of at least 10,000 inhabitants are urban roads (type D and E) under the jurisdiction of the relevant municipalities. The state highway that cross towns or villages with a population of less than 10,000 inhabitants are urban roads (type D and E) under the jurisdiction of the municipality, subject to authorization from ANAS.

Notable state highways in Italy are the Strada statale 1 Via Aurelia, the Strada statale 4 Via Salaria, the Strada statale 4 dir, Strada statale 7 Via Appia, the Strada statale 12 dell'Abetone e del Brennero, the Strada statale 18 Tirrena Inferiore, the Strada statale 35 dei Giovi, the Strada statale 36 del Lago di Como e dello Spluga, the Strada statale 37 del Maloja, the Strada statale 38 dello Stelvio, the Strada statale 44 del Passo di Giovo, the Strada statale 44 bis Passo del Rombo, the Strada statale 48 delle Dolomiti, the Strada statale 72 di San Marino, the Strada statale 106 Jonica, the Strada statale 115 Sud Occidentale Sicula, the Strada statale 125 Orientale Sarda, the Strada statale 131 Carlo Felice, the Strada statale 131 Diramazione Centrale Nuorese, the Strada statale 148 Pontina, the Strada statale 163 Amalfitana, the Strada statale 336 dell'Aeroporto della Malpensa and the Strada statale 407 Basentana.

=== India ===
Road marker for state highways in India

Road marker for state highways in urban stretches of India

State highways in India are numbered highways that are laid and maintained by state governments.

=== Japan ===
Road marker for Fukuoka Prefecture Route 8

In Japan, prefectural roads are maintained by the governments of the prefecture they are in. By length, 10.7% of public roads in Japan were prefectural roads as of 2011; by usage, they carried more than 30% of all traffic volume on public roads as of 2007.

=== Mexico ===
Mexico's State Highway System is a system of urban and state routes constructed and maintained by each Mexican state. The main purpose of the state networks is to serve as a feeder system to the federal highway system. All states except the Federal District operate a road network. Each state marks these routes with a white shield containing the abbreviated name of the state plus the route number.

=== New Zealand ===
New Zealand state highway marker

New Zealand state highways are national highways – the word "state" in this sense means "government" or "public" (as in state housing and state schools), not a division of a country.

New Zealand's state highway system is a nationwide network of roads covering the North Island and the South Island. As of 2006, just under 100 roads have a "State Highway" designation. The NZ Transport Agency administers them. The speed limit for most state highways is 100 km/h, with reductions when one passes through a densely populated area.

The highways in New Zealand are all state highways, and the network consists of SH 1 running the length of both main islands, SH 2–5 and 10–59 in the North Island, and SH 6–8 and 60–99 in the South Island. National and provincial highways are numbered approximately north to south. State Highway 1 runs the length of both islands.

=== South Korea ===
In South Korea, local highways (Korean: 지방도; Hanja: 地方道; RR: Jibangdo; MR: Chipangdo) are the next important roads under the national highways. The number has two, three, or four digits. Highways with two-digit numbers are called state-funded local highways.

=== Turkey ===
Highway shield of the D.100, a major state highway in Turkey.

In Turkey, state roads (Turkish: devlet yolu) are primary roads, mostly under the responsibility of General Directorate of Highways (KGM) except in metropolitan city centers where the responsibility lies with local government. The roads have a three-digit number designation, preceded by D.

Provincial roads (Turkish: İl yolu) are secondary roads, maintained by respective local governments with the support of the KGM. The roads have a four-digit numbering grouped as two pairs separated by a dash. The first pair represents the license number of that province.

=== United States ===
Default U.S. state highway marker

In the United States, state highways are generally a mixture of primary and secondary roads, although some are freeways (for example, State Route 99 in California, which links many of the cities of the Central Valley, Route 128 in Massachusetts, or parts of Route 101 in New Hampshire). Each state has its own system for numbering and its own marker. The default marker is a white circle containing a black sans-serif number (often inscribed in a black square or slightly rounded square), according to the Manual on Uniform Traffic Control Devices (MUTCD). However each state is free to choose a different marker, and most states have. States may choose a design theme relevant to its state (such as an outline of the state itself) to distinguish state route markers from interstate, county, or municipal route markers. The longest state highway in the U.S. is Montana Highway 200.

== See also ==
- County highway
- Numbered street
- Highways in Australia
- United States:
  - List of longest state highways in the United States
  - Numbered highways in the United States
  - Interstate Highway System
  - United States Numbered Highway System
