= Strada statale 44 del Passo di Giovo =

State highway in Italy

State Highway 44
- Strada statale 44
- Passo di Giovo

Route information
- Maintained by ANAS
- Length: 57.82 km (35.93 mi)
- Existed: 1928–present

Major junctions
- From: Merano
- To: Vipiteno

Location
- Country: Italy
- Regions: Trentino-Alto Adige/Südtirol

Highway system
- Roads in Italy; Autostrade; State; Regional; Provincial; Municipal
← SS 43 dir/A	→ SS 44 bis

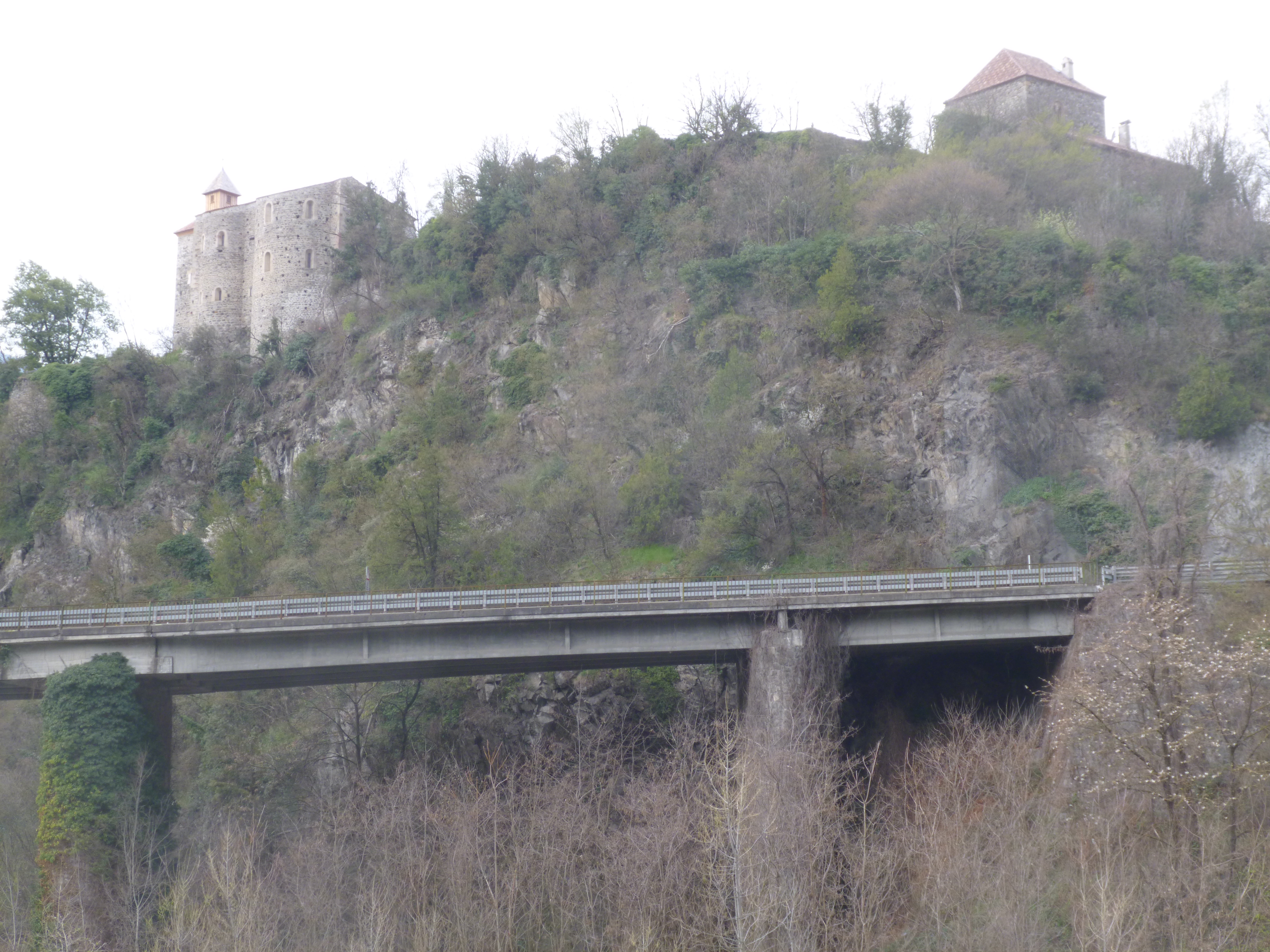
Strada statale 44 del Passo di Giovo in Merano with the Castel San Zeno in the background

Strada statale 44 del Passo di Giovo (SS 44) is an Italian state highway 57.829 kilometres (35.933 mi) long in Italy located in the region of Trentino-Alto Adige/Südtirol which connects Adige Valley with Isarco Valley passing through Passaria Valley.

It originates in Merano from the Strada statale 38 dello Stelvio and ends in Vipiteno joining the Strada statale 12 dell'Abetone e del Brennero. The road, detached from the SS 38 dello Stelvio, goes up Passaria Valley up to San Leonardo in Passiria; here begins the ascent to Monte Giovo Pass, whence the name, where it reaches its maximum altitude. The stretch between San Leonardo in Passiria and Vipiteno was built by the Austrian military in 1912. From here, the road descends to Jaufen Valley until it joins SS 12 del Brennero.

In San Leonardo in Passiria, the main valley branches off to the north-west, through which the SS 44 bis continues, leading to Rombo Pass and to the border with the Austria.

== See also ==
- State highways (Italy)
- Roads in Italy
- Transport in Italy

=== Other Italian roads ===
- Autostrade of Italy
- Regional road (Italy)
- Provincial road (Italy)
- Municipal road (Italy)
