= Ötztalstraße =

State road B186
- Landesstraße B186
- Ötztalstraße (Austrian German)
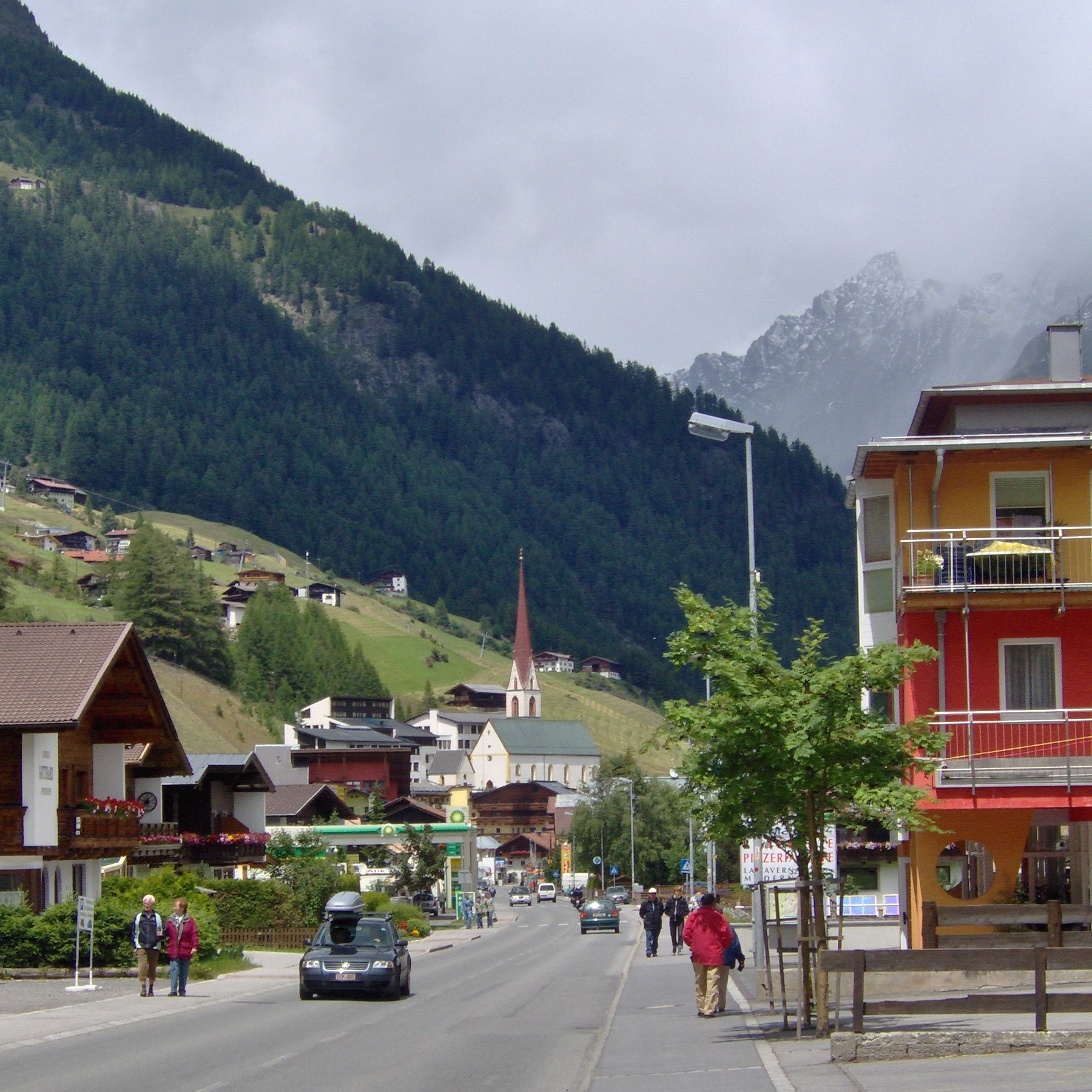
- The Ötztalstraße in Sölden

Route information
- Length: 48.44 km (30.10 mi)

Location
- Country: Austria
- Regions: Tyrol

Highway system
- Highways of Austria; Autobahns; Expressways; State Roads

Ötztalstraße (B 186) is a Landesstraße in Austria and connects the Tirol Inntal with the Ötztal.

== History ==
In the middle of the 19th century, the path into the Ötztal was only accessible to Längenfeld. In 1895 the Tiroler Landtag decided to build a new road through the Ötztal into the Passeier Valley. From 1898, the path was expanded to a road that could be driven on with the financial support of the state. In 1903, the Ötztalstraße to Sölden was completed, and in 1911, the continuation to Zwieselstein was completed. In 1926, the first post buses drove through the Ötztal. In 1936, the section from Zwieselstein to Gurgl was opened to traffic. The northern ramp of Timmelsjochstrasse was built from 1955 to 1959.

The Ötztal Straße to Zwieselstein has been part of the network of federal highways in Austria since 1 January 1949. Since 1 January 1973, the federal road has continued from Zwieselstein to Untergurgl, where the toll road Timmelsjoch High Alpine Road begins. On 1 April 2002, the Ötztalstrasse was taken over into the state administration like the other federal highways.

On 15 May 2002 the name was changed to Ötztalstraße by the Tyrolean State Parliament.
