= Timmelsjoch =

Mountain pass along the border between Austria and Italy

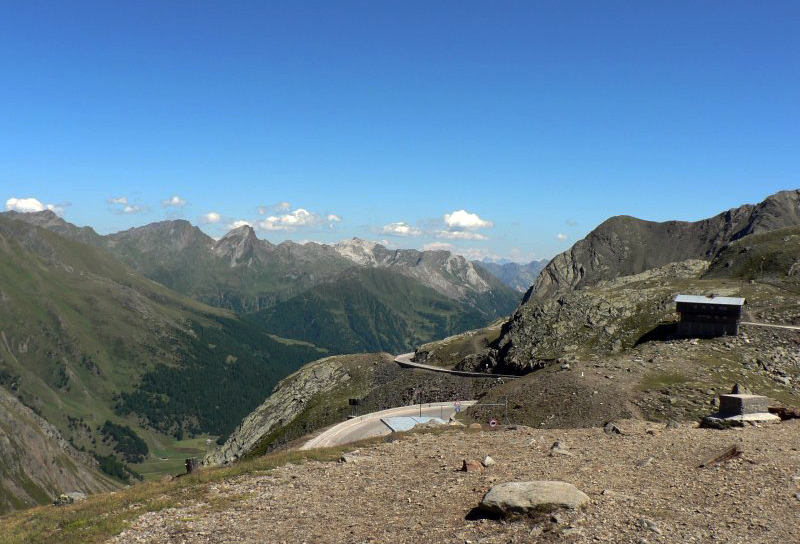
- View from Timmelsjoch to the South

- Location within Alps
- Elevation: 2,474 m (8,117 ft)

Location
- Location: Austria–Italy border
- Range: Ötztal Alps
- Coordinates: 46°54′19″N 11°5′48″E

Timmelsjoch (German pronunciation: [ˈtɪml̩sˌjɔx]; Italian: Passo del Rombo), (elevation 2,474 metres (8,117 ft)) is a high mountain pass that creates a link through the Ötztal Alps along the border between Austria and Italy.

The Timmelsjoch connects the Ötztal valley in the Austrian state of Tyrol to the Passeier Valley in the Italian province of South Tyrol, as it bridges the saddle point between the Jochköpfl (3,141 metres (10,305 ft)) and Wurmkogl (3,082 metres (10,112 ft)) peaks to its northeast and southwest, respectively. The pass is sometimes called the "secret passage" because it is little-used compared to the much easier and lower Brenner Pass some 25 kilometres (16 mi) to its east, and Reschen Pass some 60 kilometres (37 mi) to its west.

== History ==
During the early Stone Age, shepherds and their flocks lived in the Obergurgl area near Timmelsjoch. By the early Bronze Age, the glaciers of the last Ice Age were retreating and various hunters, adventurers, and wandering tribes entered the higher elevations in the area in search of game and treasure. The discovery of a brooch near the Schönbodenlacke dating from the La Tène period (around 300 BC) indicates that people were passing over the Timmelsjoch during this period.

By the Middle Ages, mining influenced the development of a road network in the area. Marble quarries, semiprecious stones, and oil shales were all exploited. The ancient path over the Timmelsjoch was one of many such roads in the Tyrol which helped facilitate trade and would have a profound social, cultural, political, and religious impact on the peoples of the region. The Timmelsjoch was a particularly important route because it provided one of the most direct routes between the upper Inntal valley and Meran, the regional capital at the time, as well as Tirol Castle and St. Leonhard in Passeier, where the road forks to the Jaufenpass, down to Sterzing, and on to the Brenner Pass road. During that time, cart tracks were relatively few, and travelers, peddlers, and people leading pack animals tended to choose the shortest route.

From the end of the thirteenth century to the beginning of the fifteenth century, the Timmelsjoch facilitated increased trade. Ötztaler Kraxenträger (basket bearers) transported flax, livestock, cured bacon, lard, vinegar, wine, and spirits across the pass. These early traders routes and techniques that would later inspire modern alpinists. The name "Thymelsjoch" first appeared in 1241 in a letter written by the Bavarian Count of Eschenlohe. For centuries, the spelling "Thimmeljoch" was widely used. The current spelling came into usage only in the twentieth century during the construction of the paved road.

== Timmelsjoch Hochalpenstrasse ==
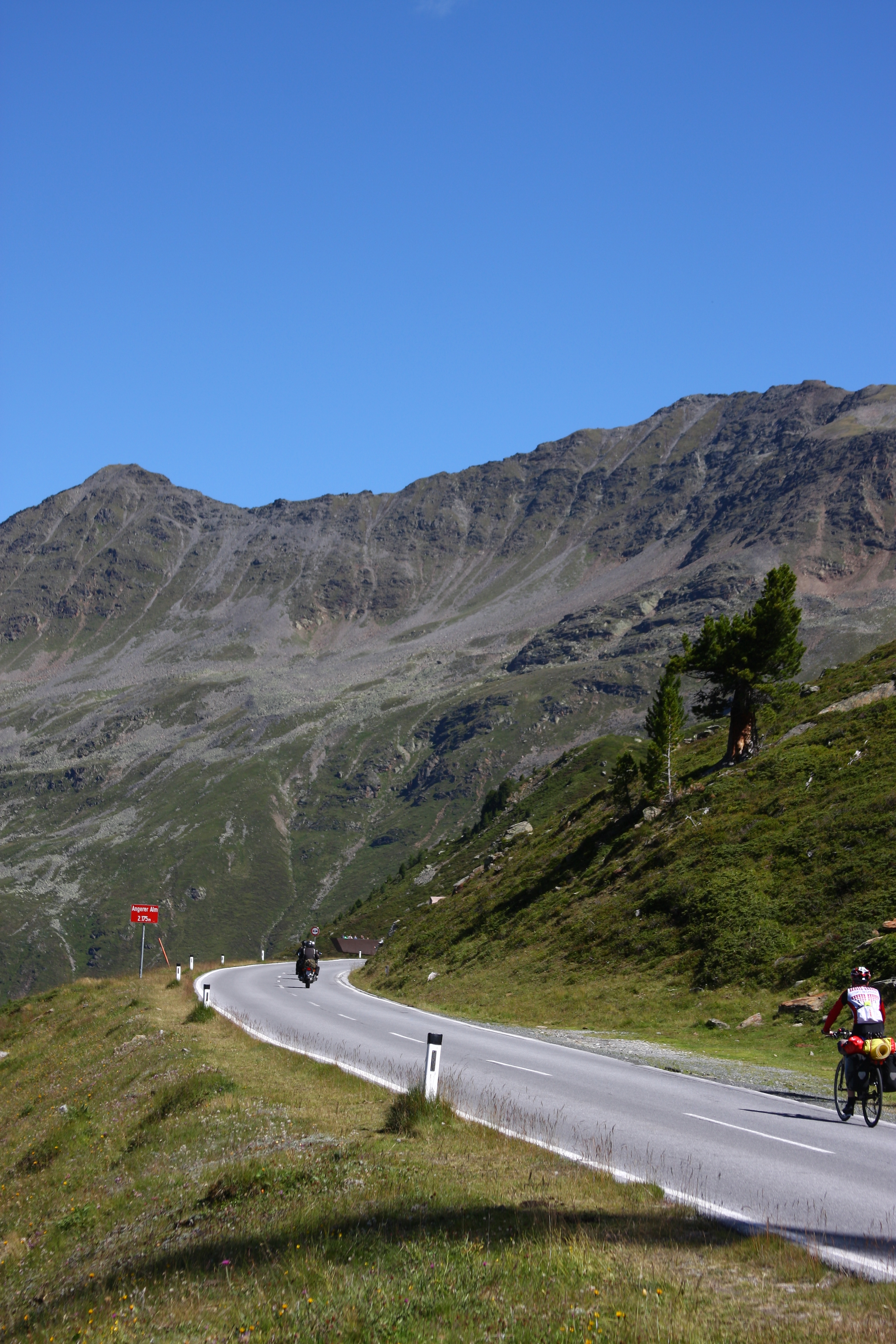
Timmelsjoch Hochalpenstrasse

The first plans to build a road across the Timmelsjoch were drawn up in 1897, when the Tyrolean Landtag (regional assembly) established a construction agenda which comprised the building of several "rival roads" including a road over the Timmelsjoch. Work would not begin until the autumn of 1955. On July 7, 1959, after four years of construction, the 12-kilometre (7.5 mi) road was finally opened to the public. The Timmelsjoch Hochalpenstrasse was well-engineered and integrated into the landscape.

While the road up from the Ötztal valley was built for tourism purposes, the situation in the Passeier Valley (on the southern side) was very different. As in many other parts of the Italian Alps, Mussolini, the ruler from 1922 to 1945, had numerous military roads built up towards Italy's international borders. Construction of the road from Moos in Passeier, 10 km southeast from the pass, commenced in the 1930s. After the meeting between Mussolini and Hitler on the Brenner in 1939, construction work ceased. The road was narrow and rough, but had almost been completed. The last 700-metre (2,300 ft) tunnel had been dug through; just the remaining 2 km stretch from its end to the pass had not been built. The tunnel partly collapsed in the following years. From 1939 to the mid-1960s, the unfinished, grassed-over road was only used for forestry purposes. Construction work resumed in the mid-1960s and the road was completed to the pass and opened to through traffic in 1967.

The road on the Ötztal valley side is called the Timmelsjoch Hochalpenstrasse. The pass is now popular with car and motorbike tourists. Due to its elevation, steepness, and narrow road, the Timmelsjoch pass is closed to lorries and vehicles with trailers. With its dramatic scenery, particularly on the southern side, the road has become popular with cyclists. On the last Sunday in August, several thousand cyclists take part in the Ötztaler Cycling Marathon crawl up the 29-kilometre (18 mi) section from St. Leonhard in Passeier (672 metres (2,205 ft)) to the pass, gaining 1,800 metres (5,900 ft)—the fourth and final pass included in the grueling 238-kilometre (148 mi) marathon.

== Timmelsjoch pass ==
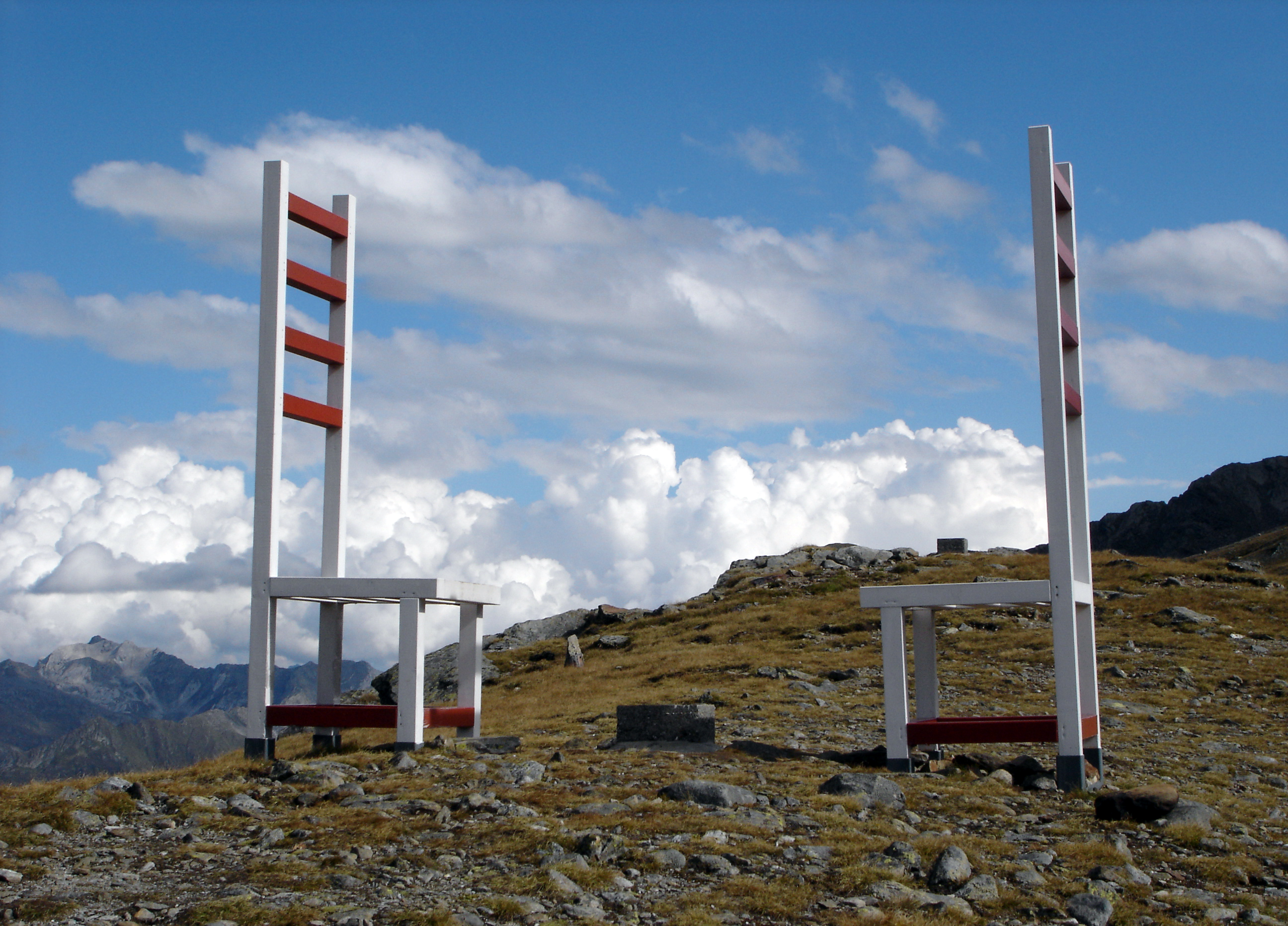
Large chairs at the pass, one on each side of the Austria-Italy border with a border marker in between

The Timmelsjoch pass is open to traffic from approximately the first half of June to the second half of October (the exact dates depend on snow conditions) daily from 7:00 am to 8:00 pm. The Ötztal valley side is subject to a toll charge. At the Timmelsjoch pass, the Rasthaus summit tavern offers travelers warm meals and drinks and a sun terrace. Overlooking the Rasthaus is a stone mountain hut with a summit cross nearby.

Several stone markers in the area indicate the Austria-Italy border.

== See also ==
- List of highest paved roads in Europe
- List of mountain passes

== Gallery ==
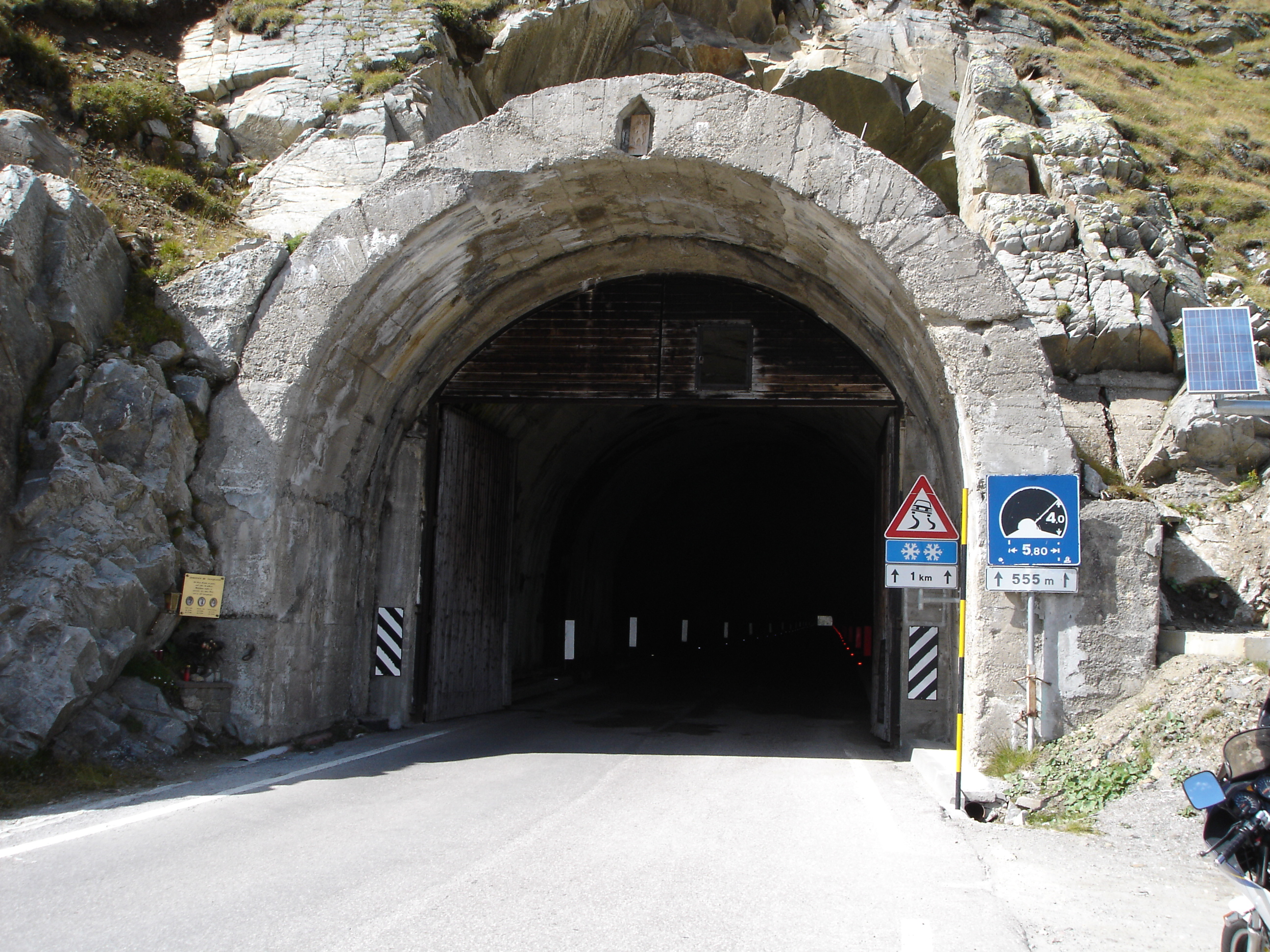
Tunnel leading to the pass from the Italian side

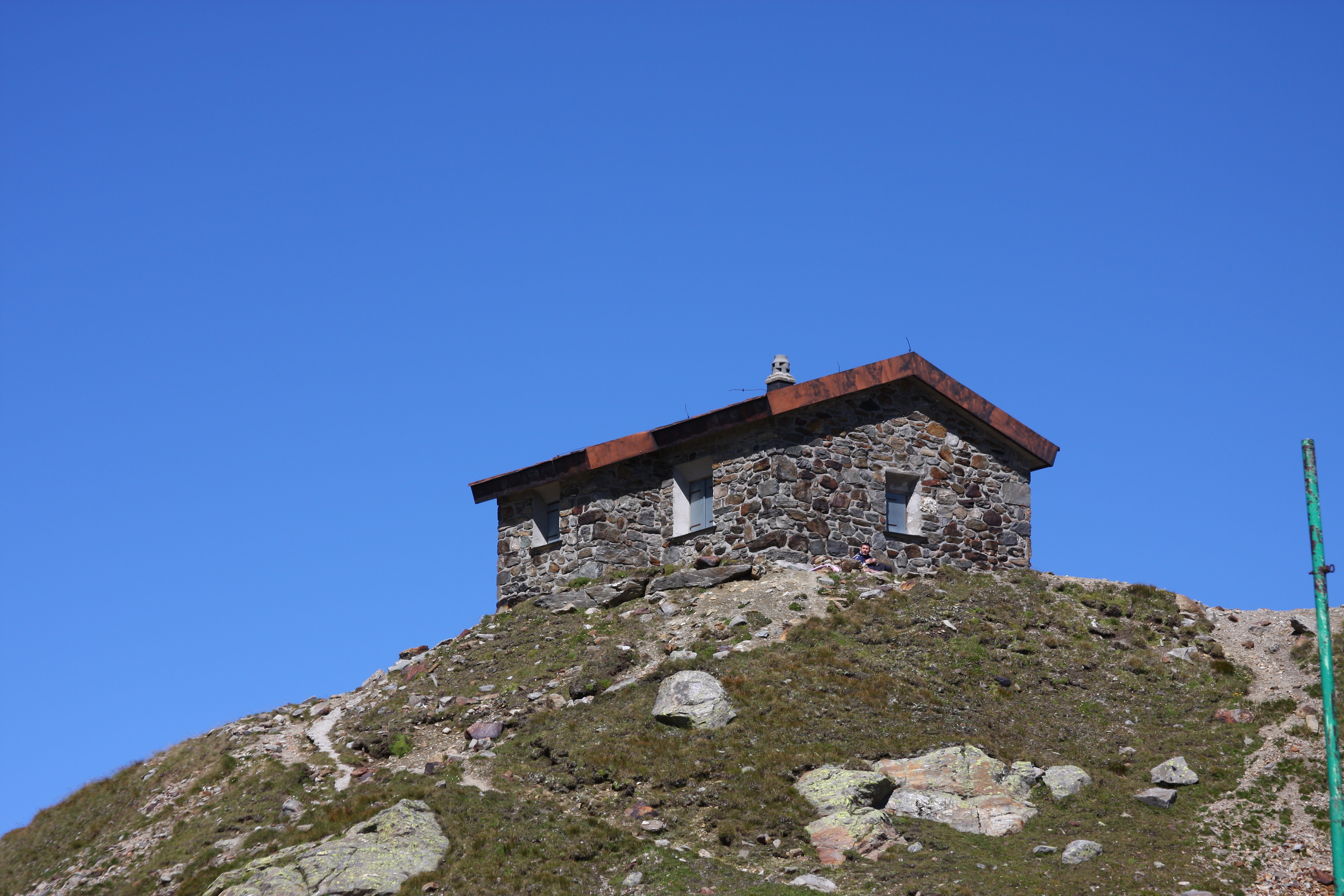
Stone mountain hut at the pass

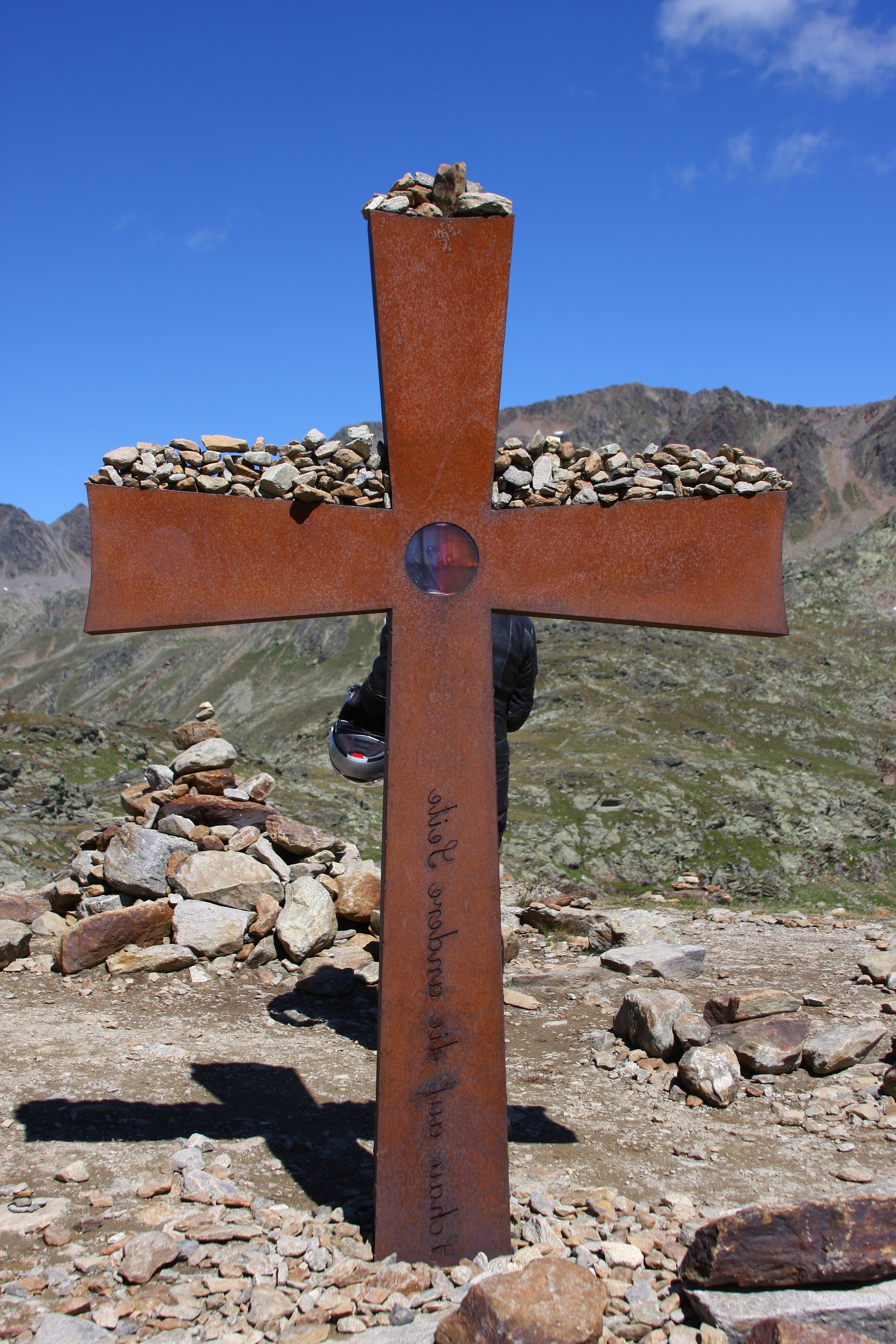
Summit cross at the pass

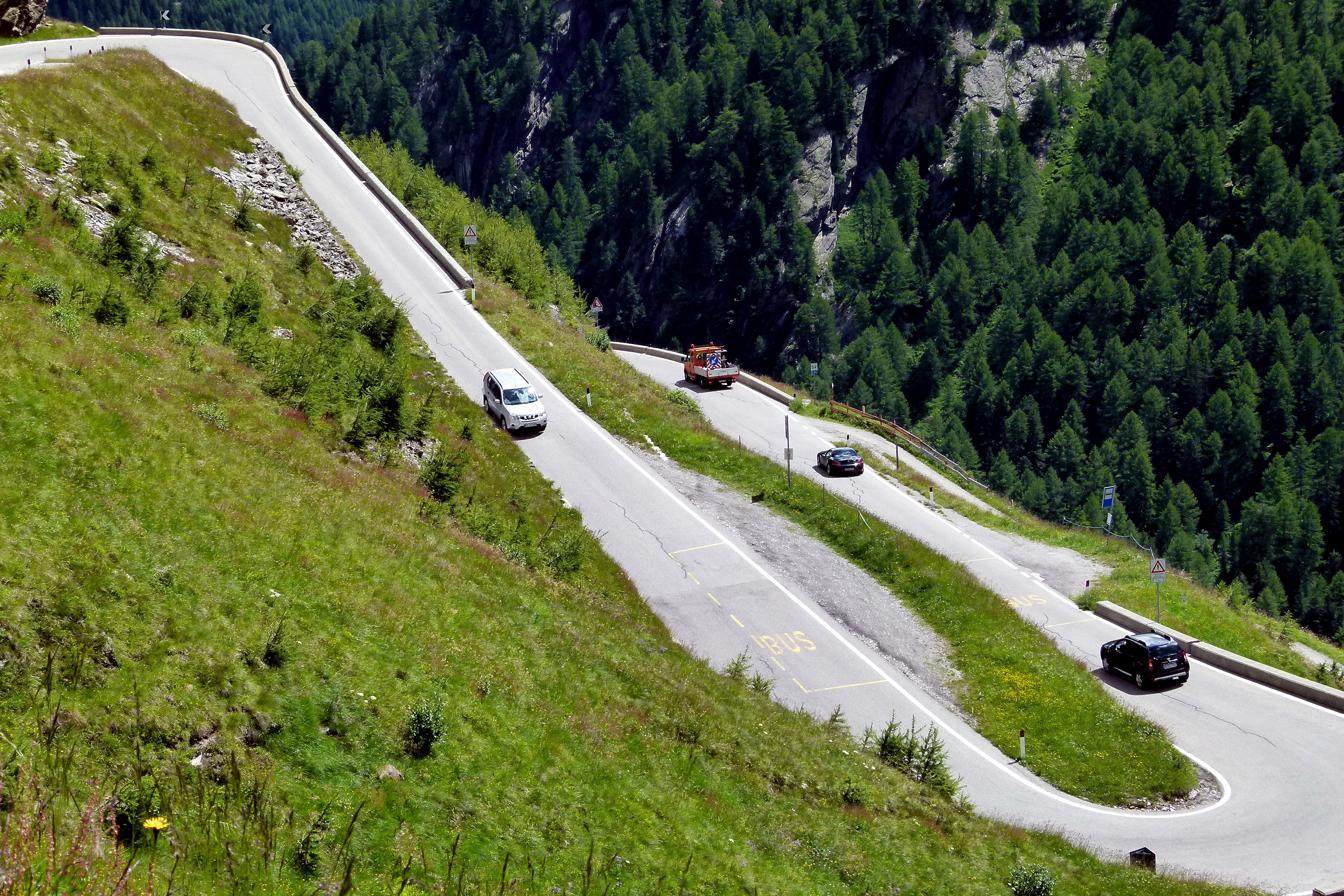
Hairpin turns

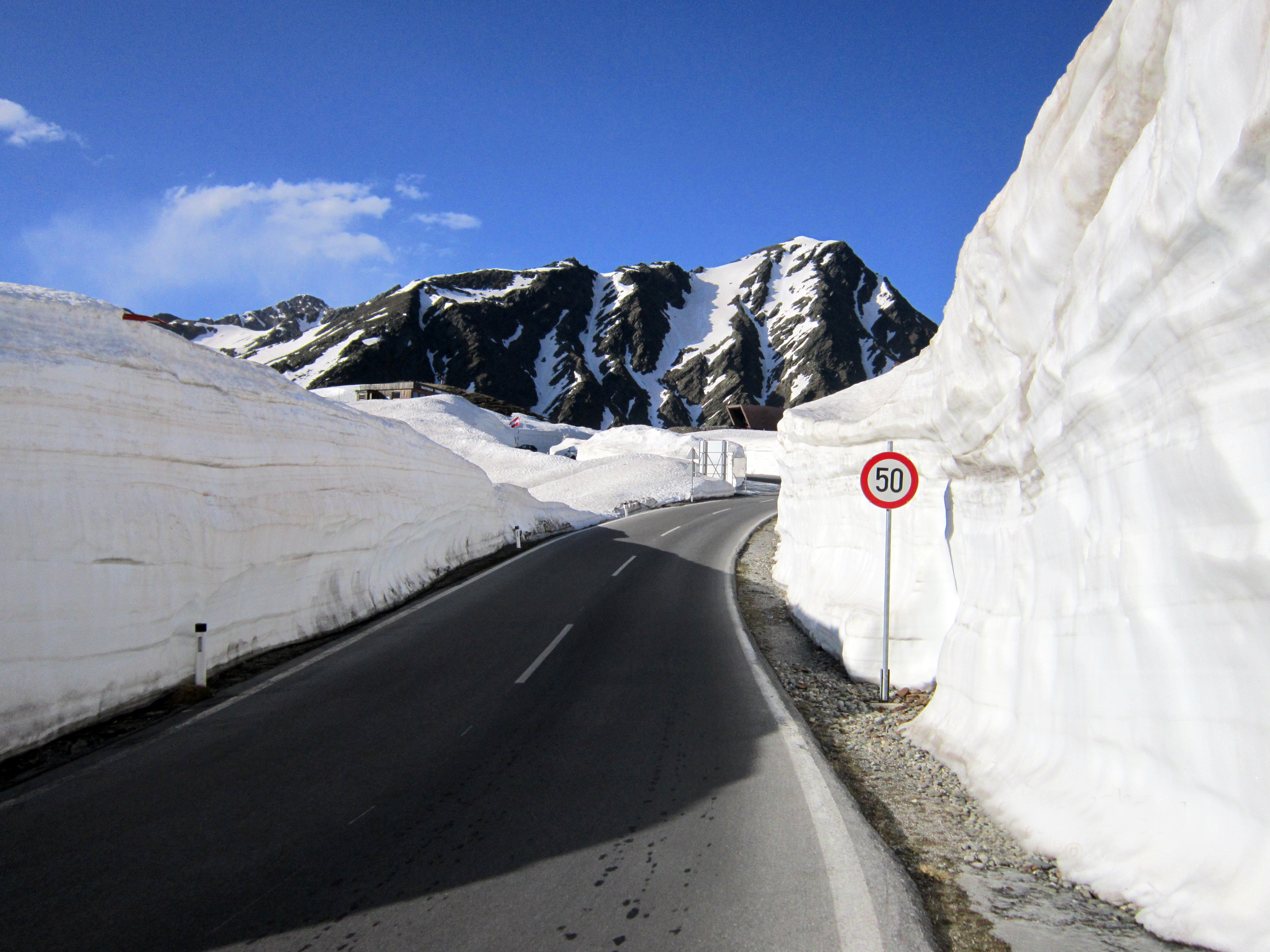
Timmelsjoch snow in early June

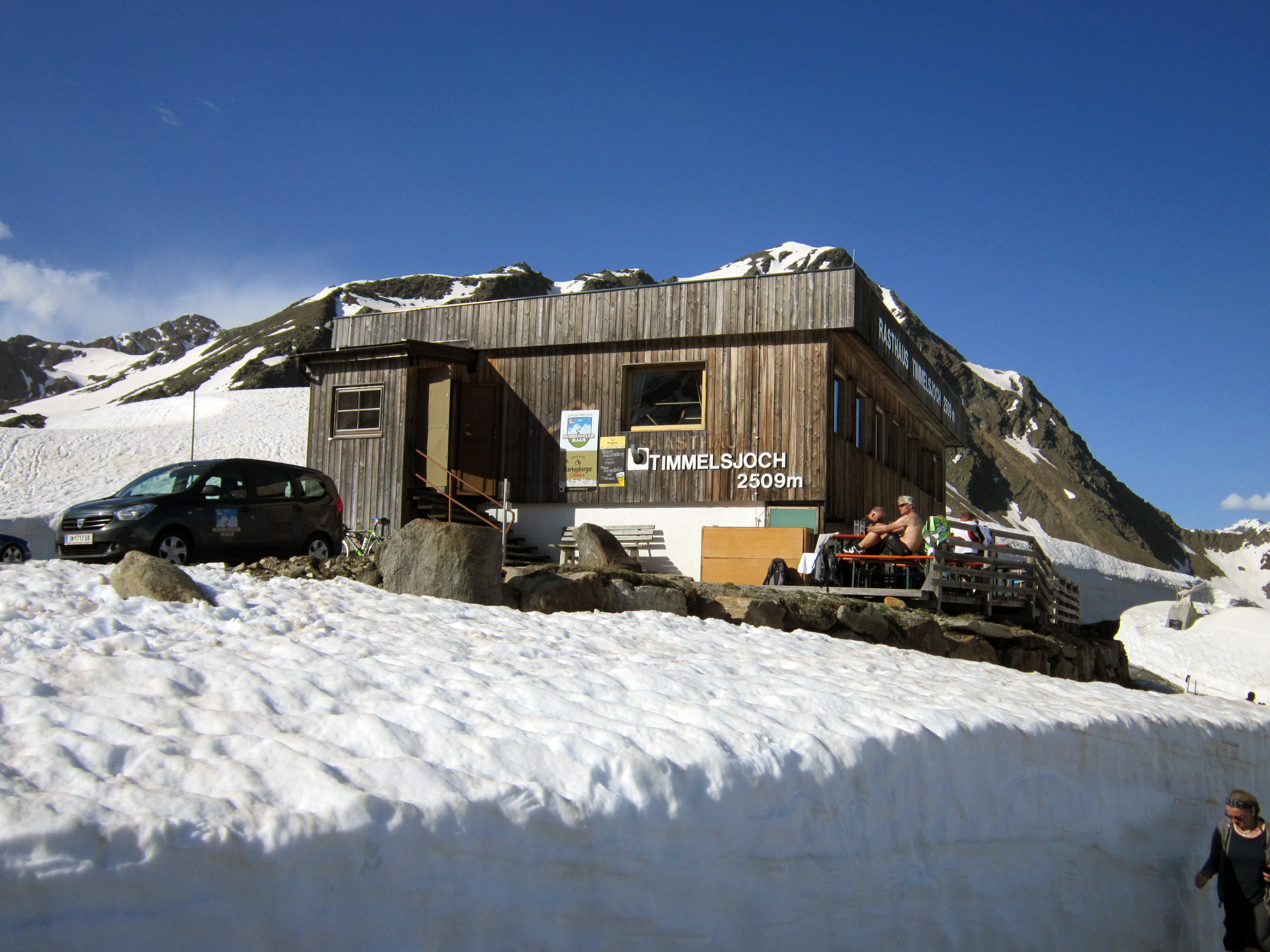
Rasthaus summit tavern at the pass

== Panorama ==
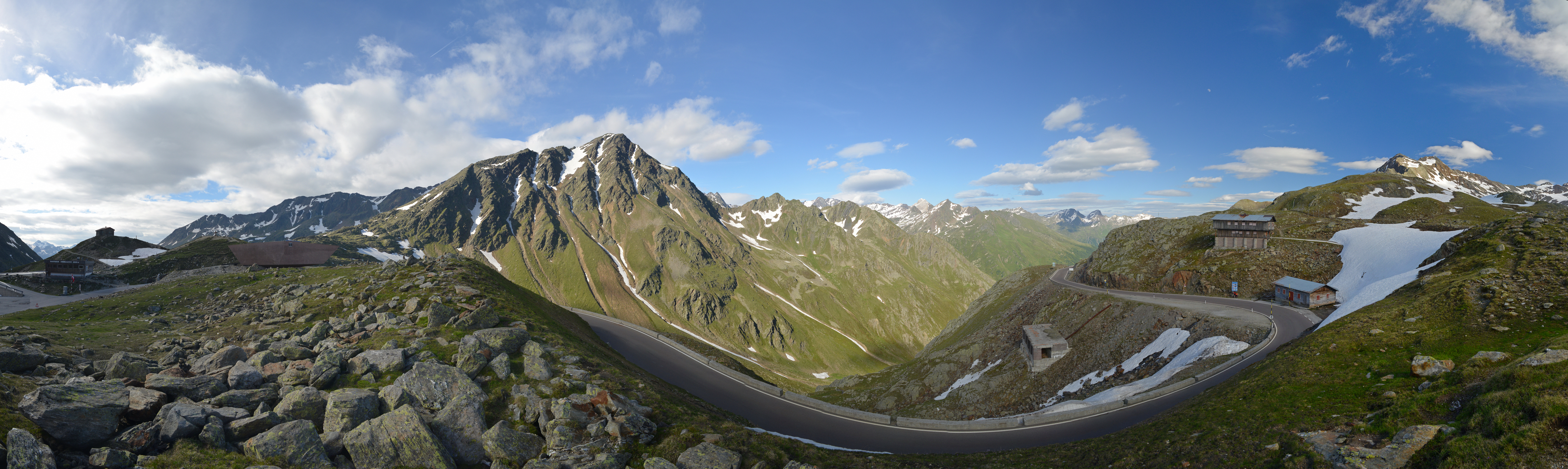
Timmelsjoch panorama
