= Jaufen Pass =

Mountain in Italy

- (Jaufenpass, Passo di Monte Giovo)
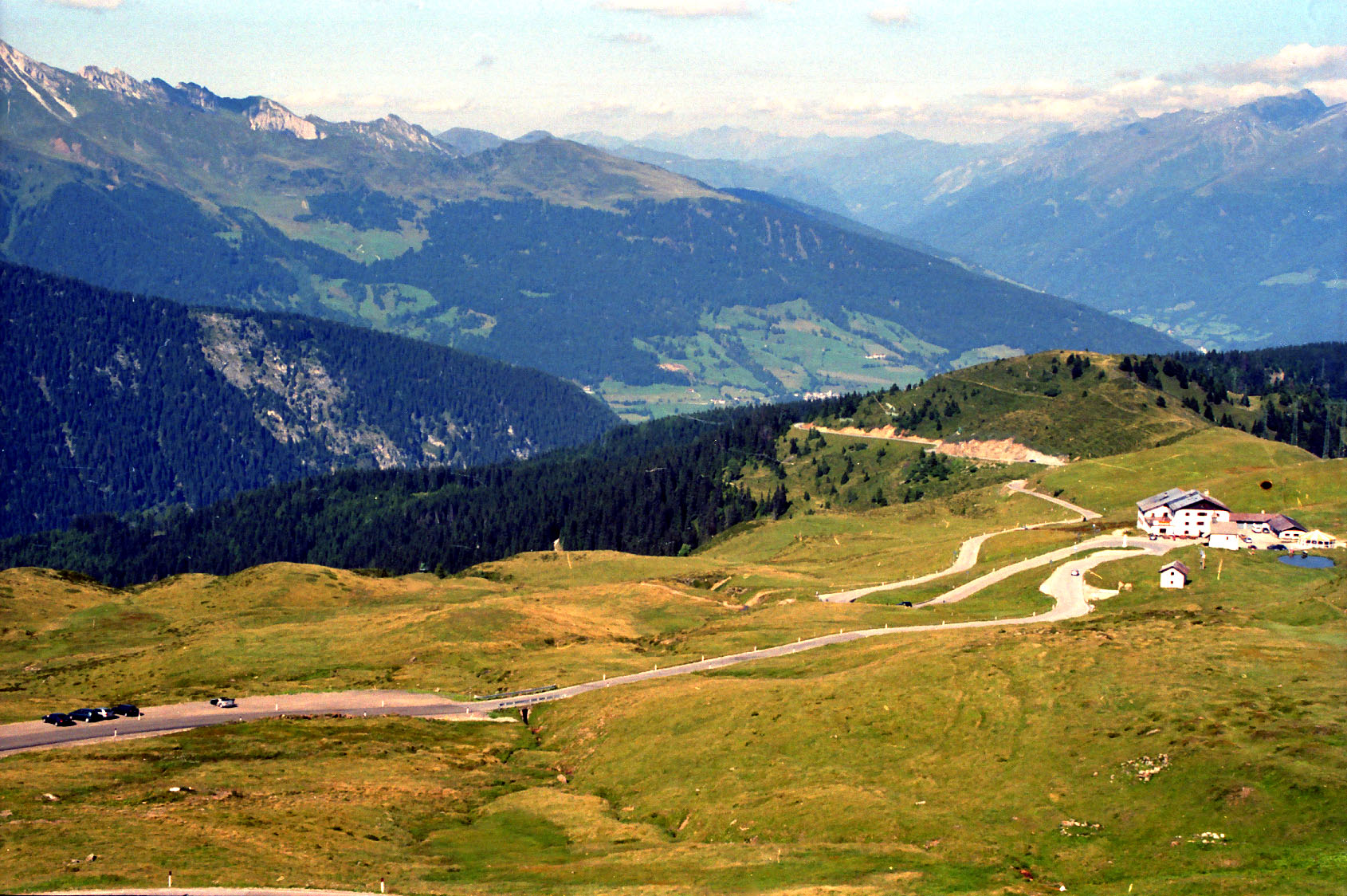
- The Jaufen Pass
- Interactive map of Jaufen Pass
- Elevation: 2,094 metres (6,870 ft)

Third Approach
- Location: South Tyrol, Italy
- Coordinates: 46°50′24″N 11°18′27″E

The Jaufen Pass (German: Jaufenpass, Italian: Passo di Monte Giovo) (el. 2,094 m.) is a high mountain pass in the Alps in the South Tyrol in Italy.

It connects Meran and Sterzing on the road to the Brenner Pass. It is the northernmost pass in the Alps that is completely in Italy. The pass road is very winding, with many switchbacks.

== Gallery ==
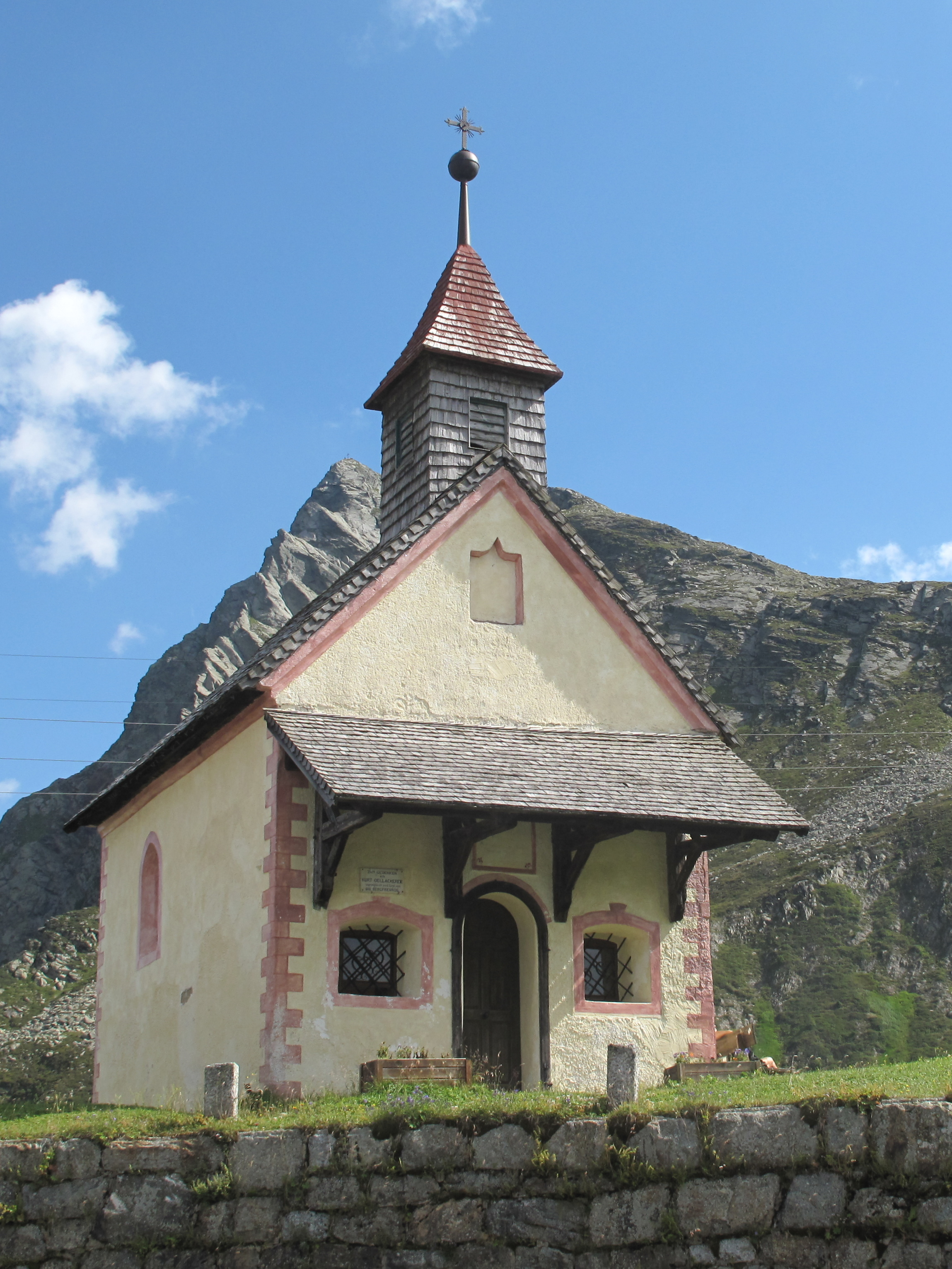
Chapel near Jaufenpass

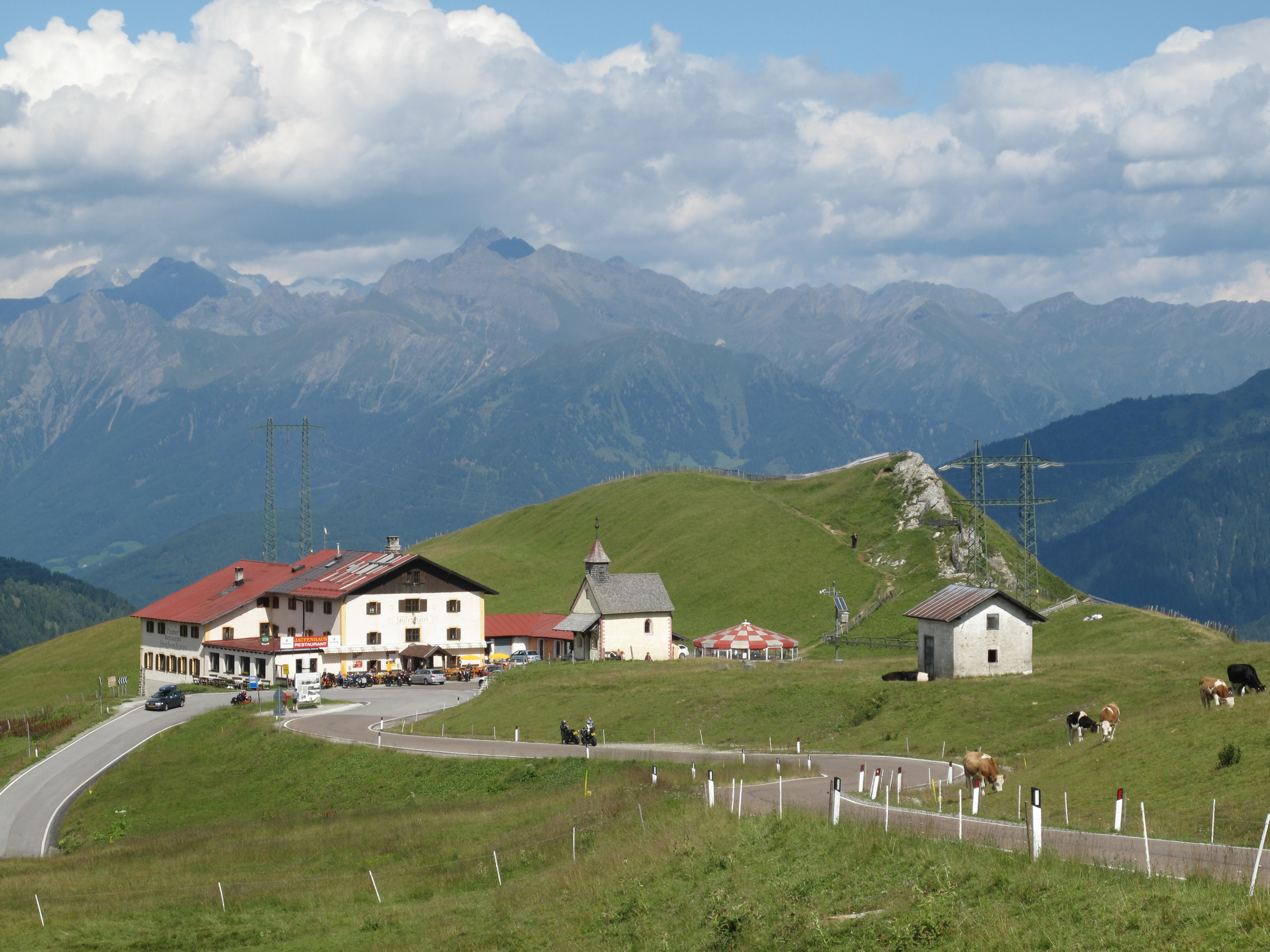
Panorama near Jaufenpass

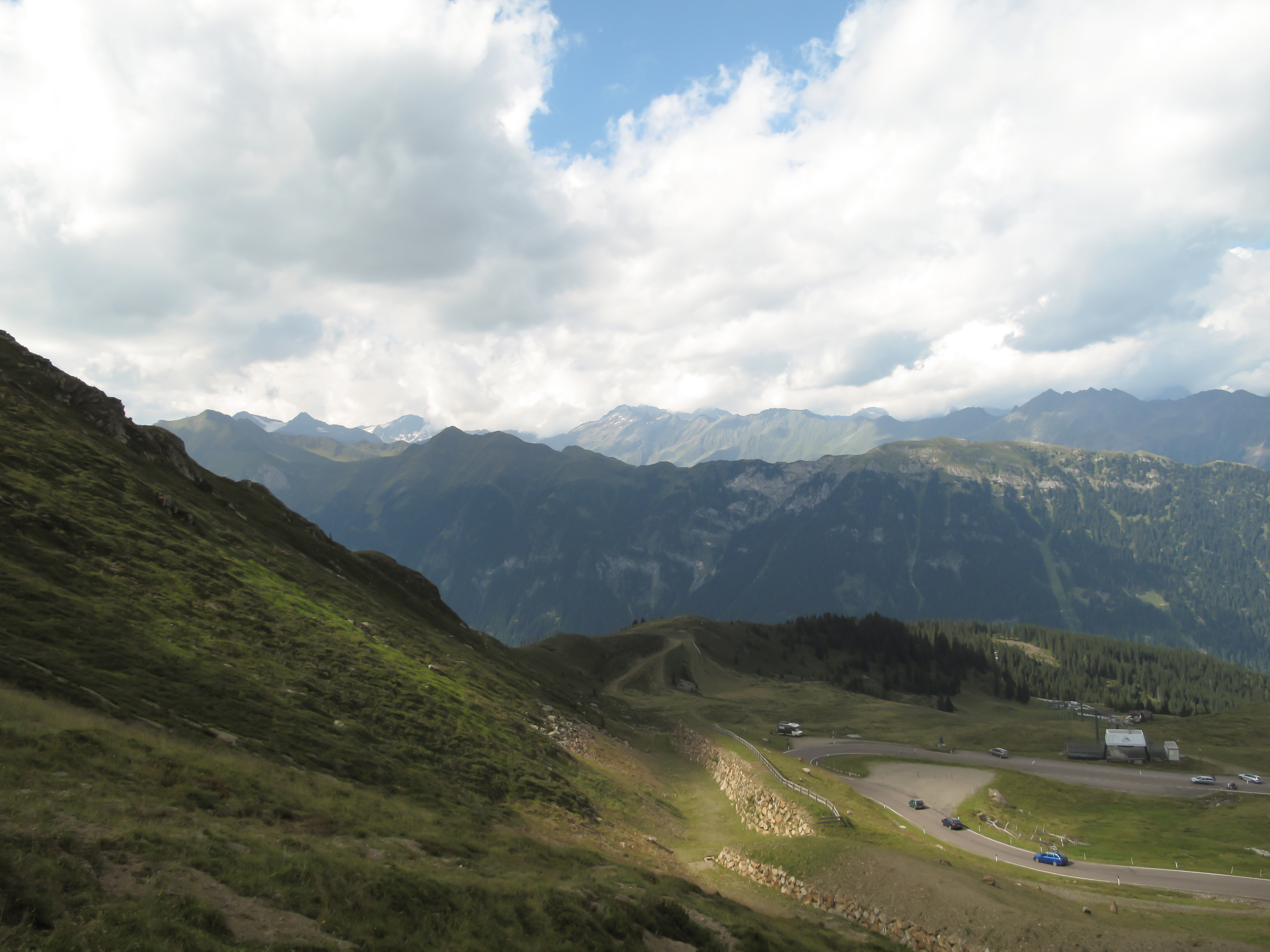
Panorama near Jaufenpass

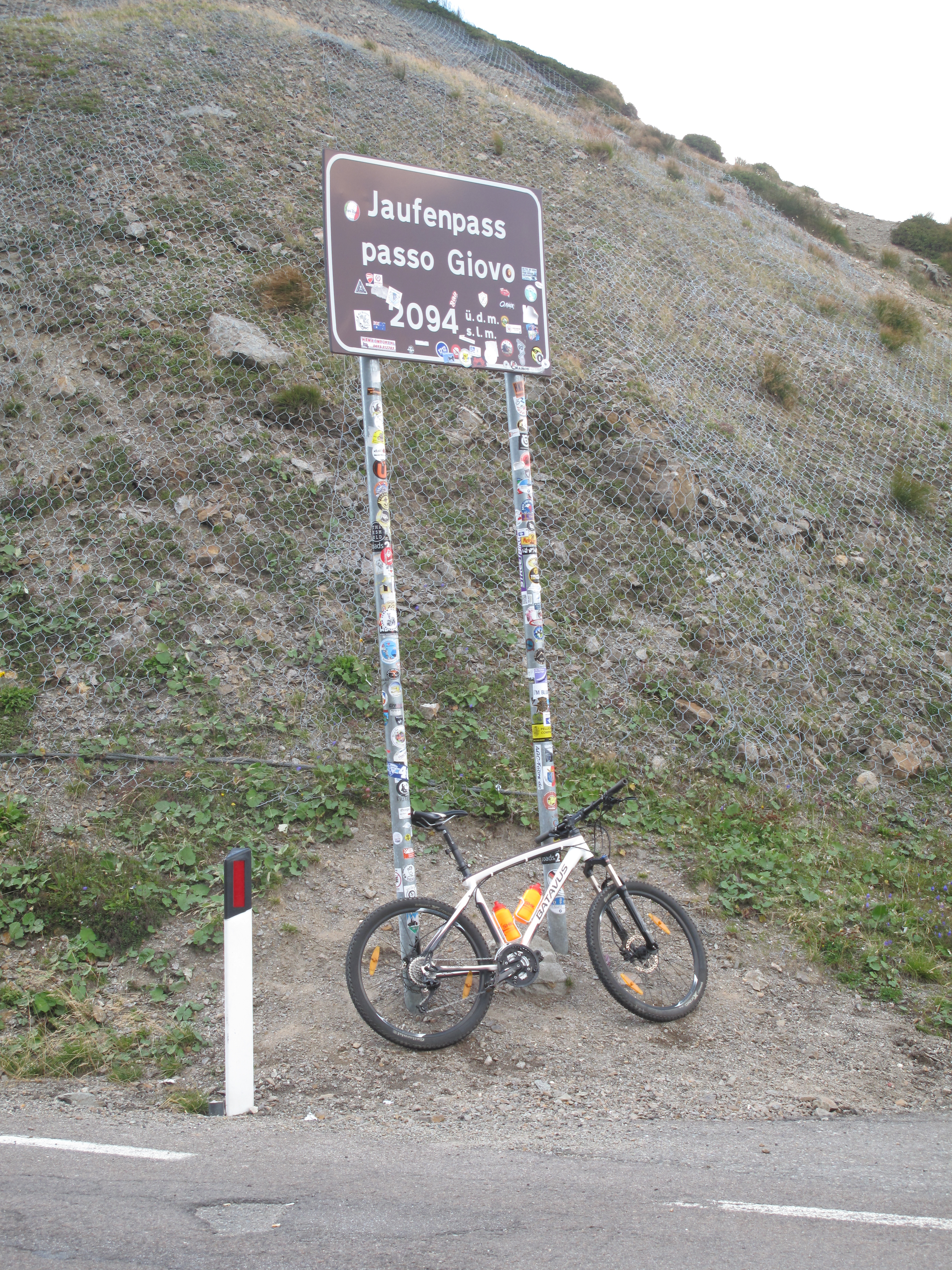
Name sign

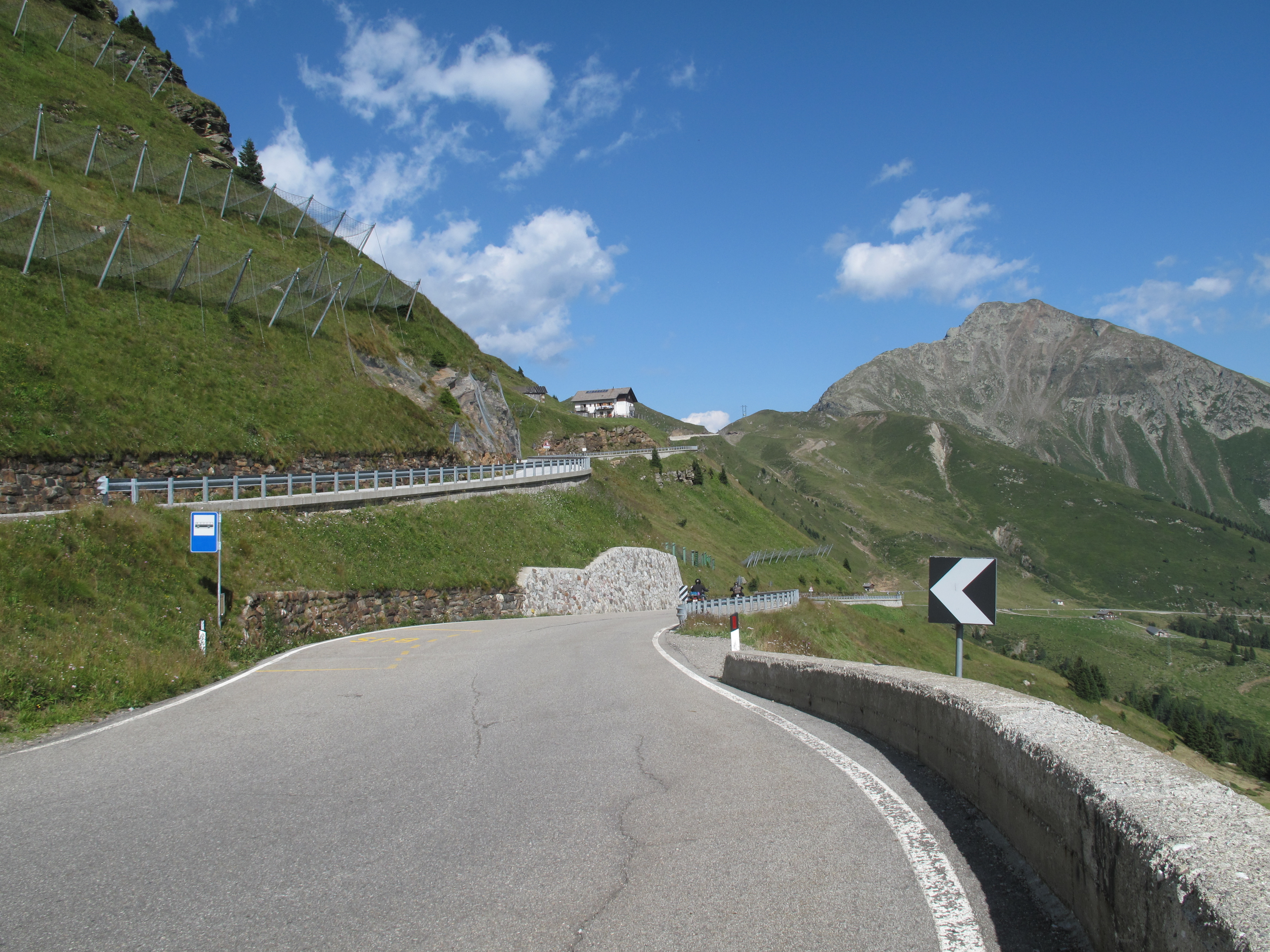
Road: from Jaufenpass to Sankt Leonhard

== See also ==
- List of highest paved roads in Europe
- List of mountain passes
