= Levati =

Levati is an Italian surname. Notable people with the surname include:

- Ambrogio Levati (1894–1963), Italian gymnast
- Giuseppe Levati (1739–1828), Italian painter
