= Villa Burba =

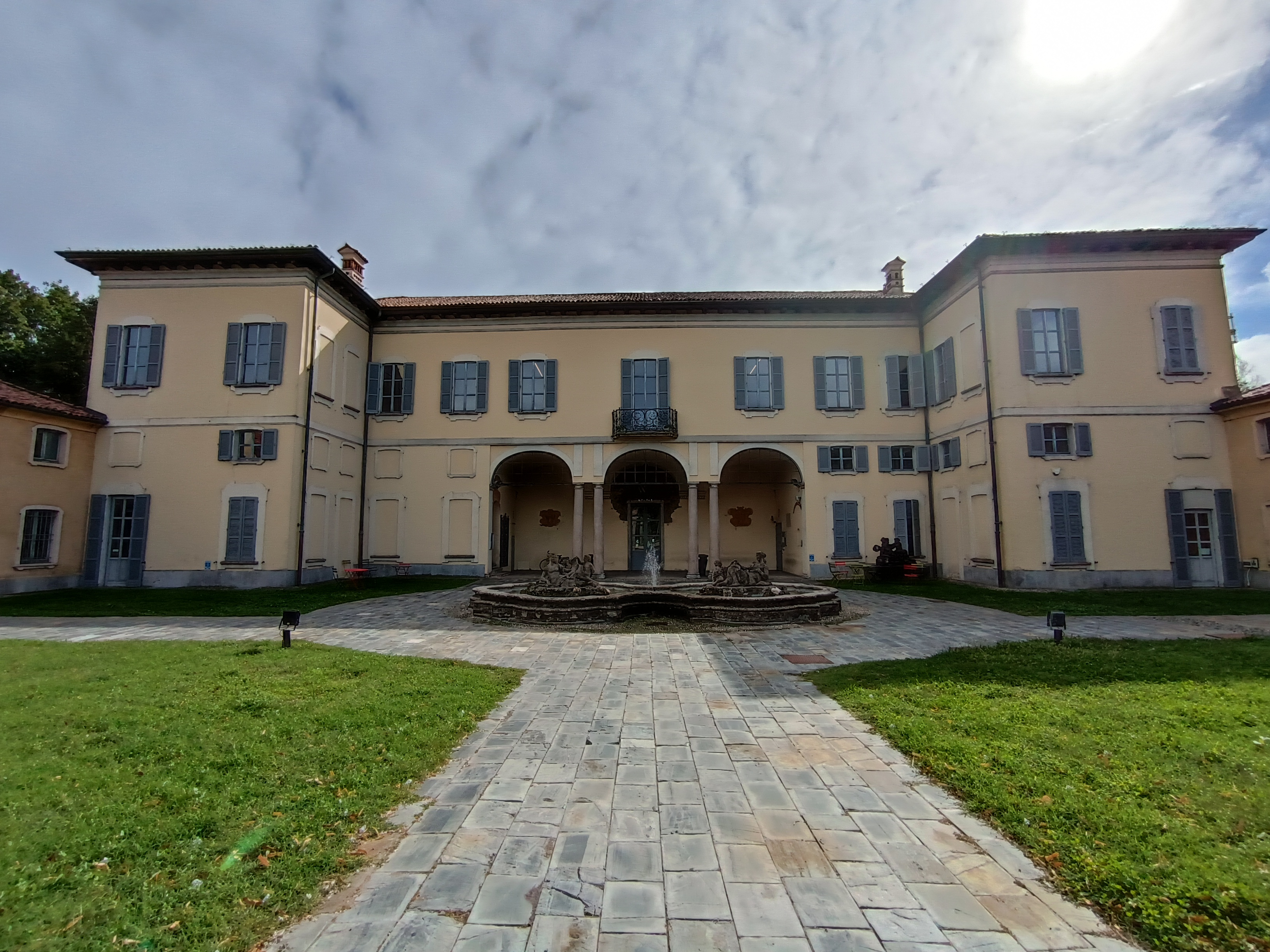
- Main facade of Villa Burba facing Corso Europa
- Click on the map for a fullscreen view

General information
- Type: Historic Villa
- Architectural style: Late-Baroque
- Location: Corso Europa, 291, Rho, Italy
- Coordinates: 45°32′0.7″N 9°1′41.5″E
- Construction started: 17th century

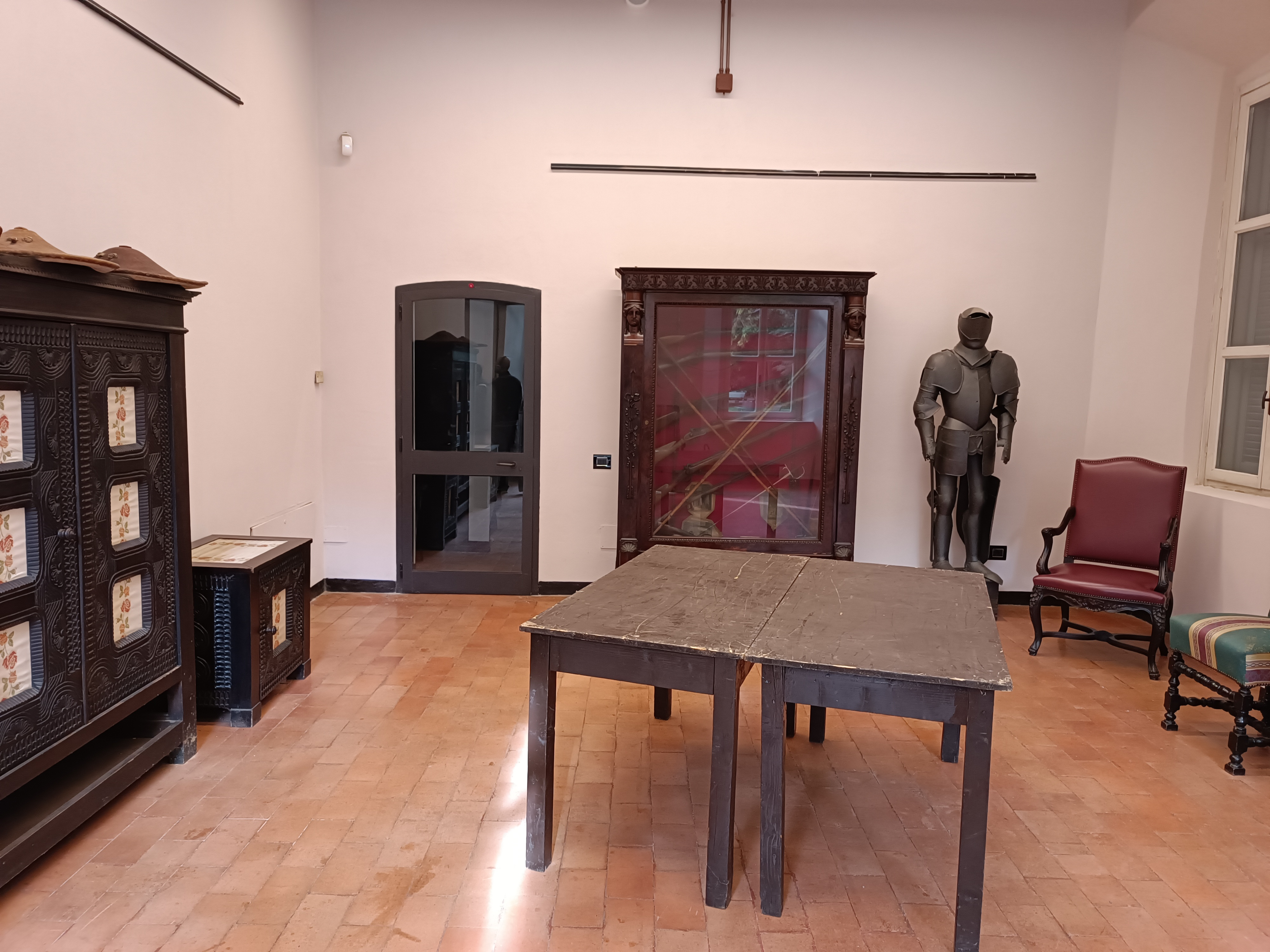
Interior room

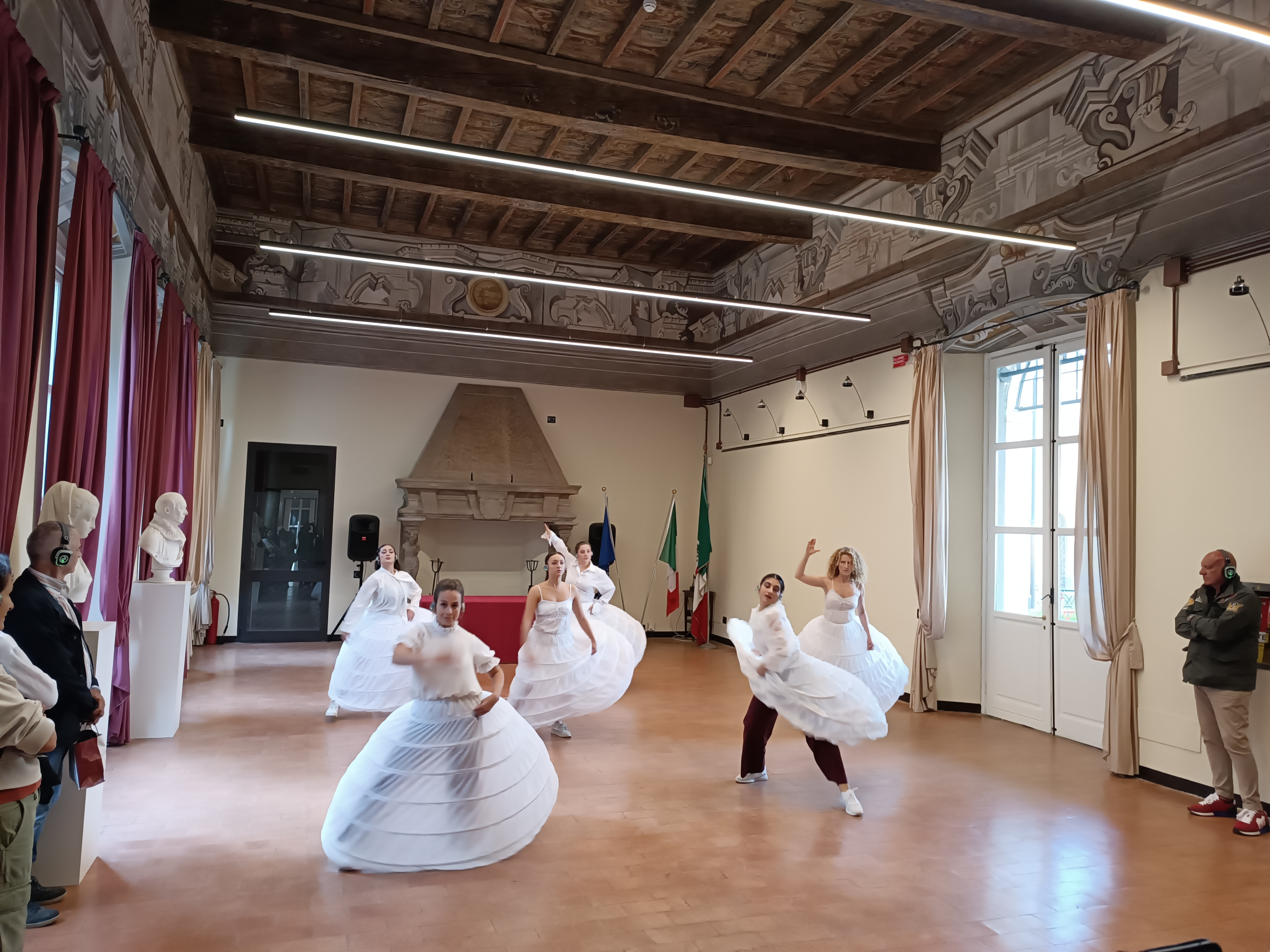
Cultural performance in the main hall

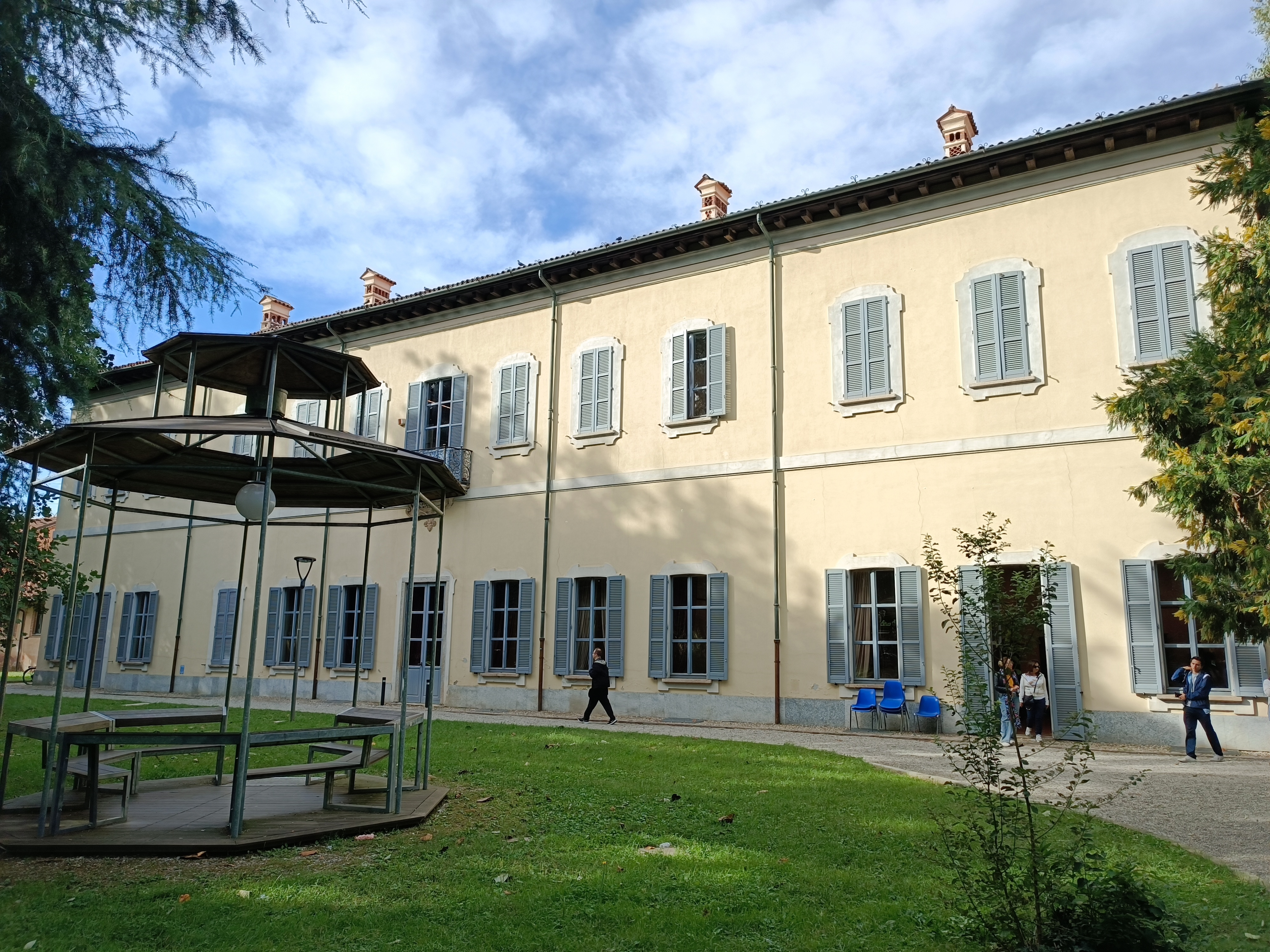
Rear facade of Villa Burba with the garden area

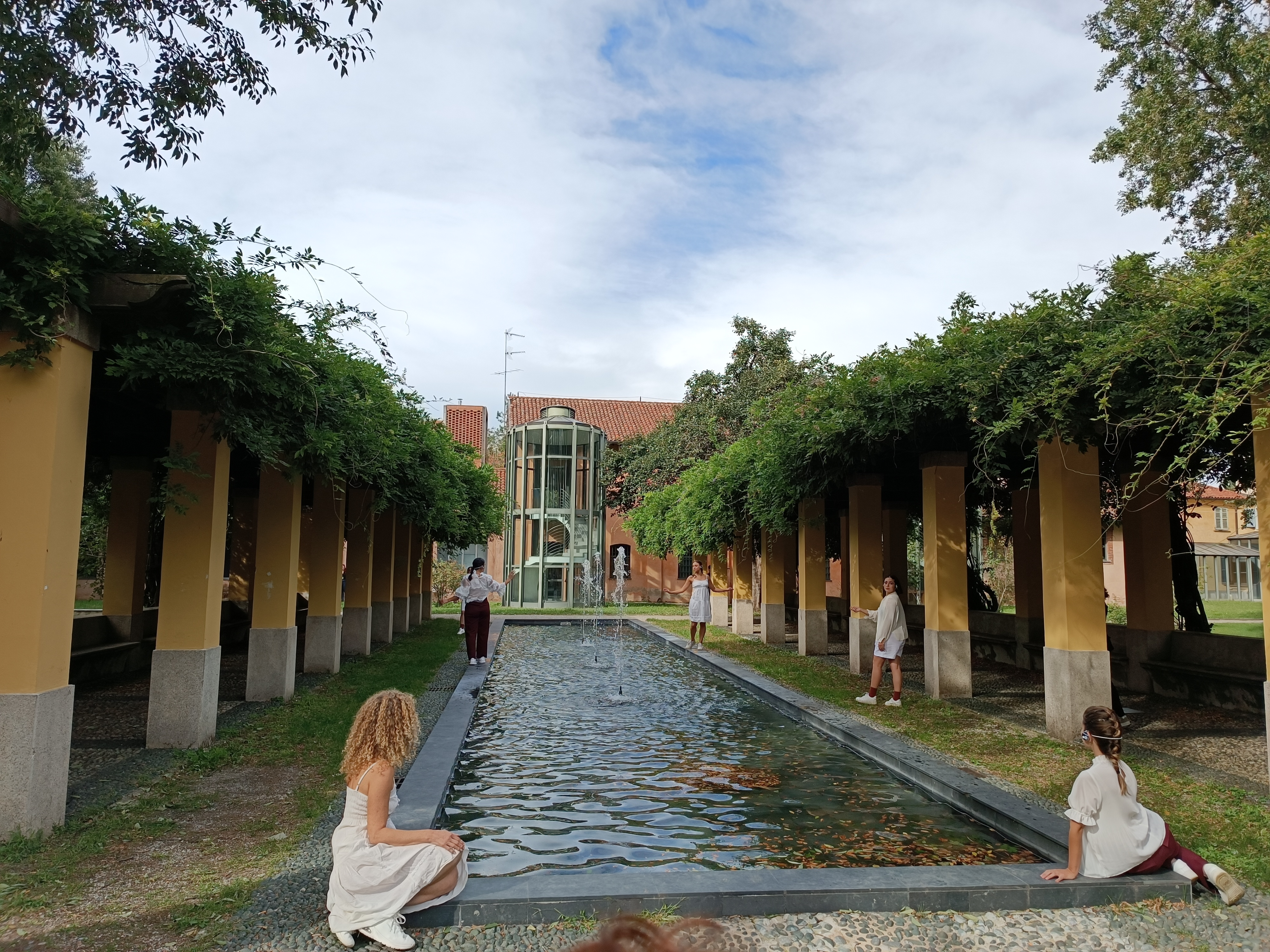
Fountain with granite benches in the historic garden

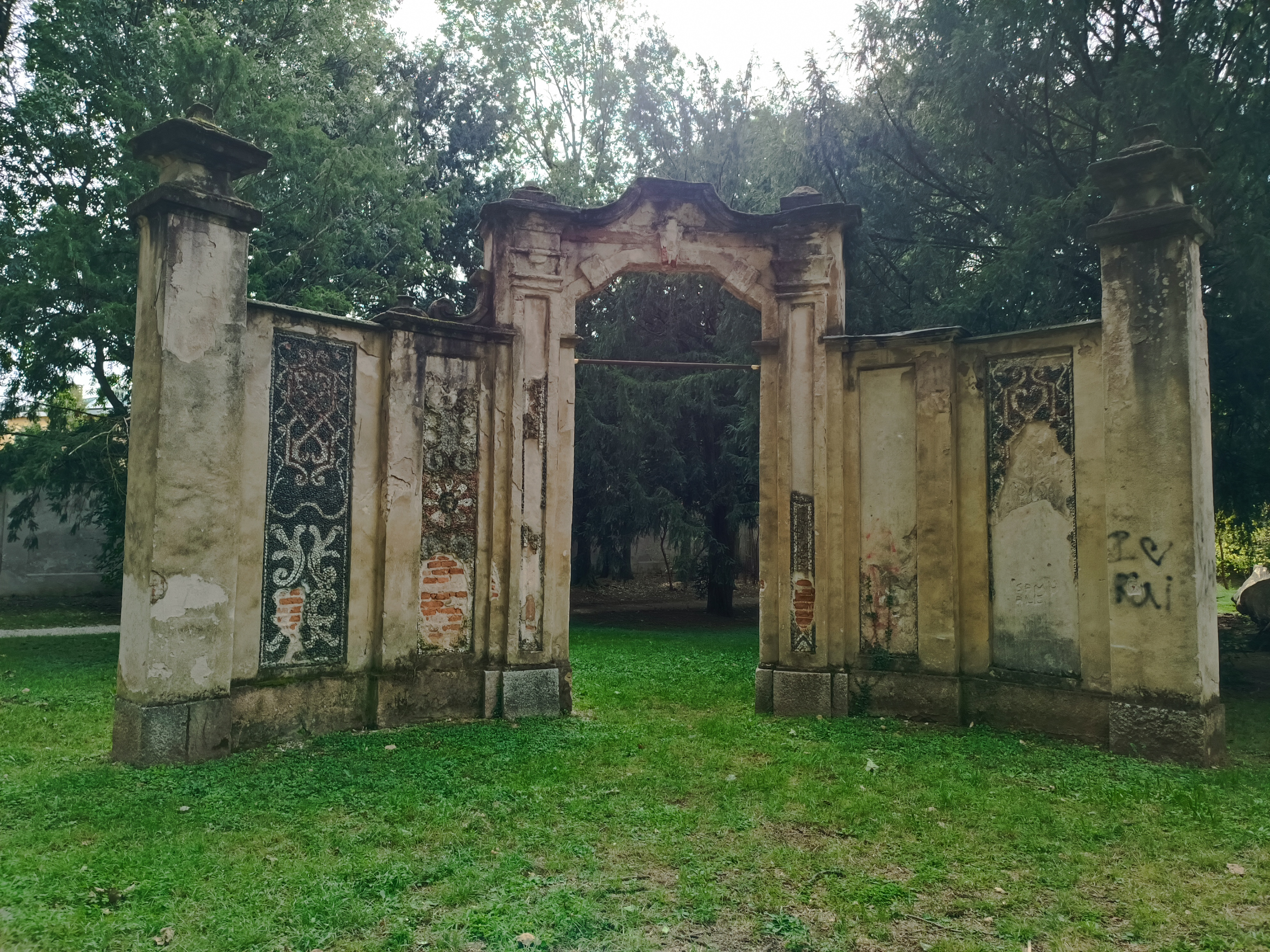
Baroque garden gateway with decorative stucco and ironwork

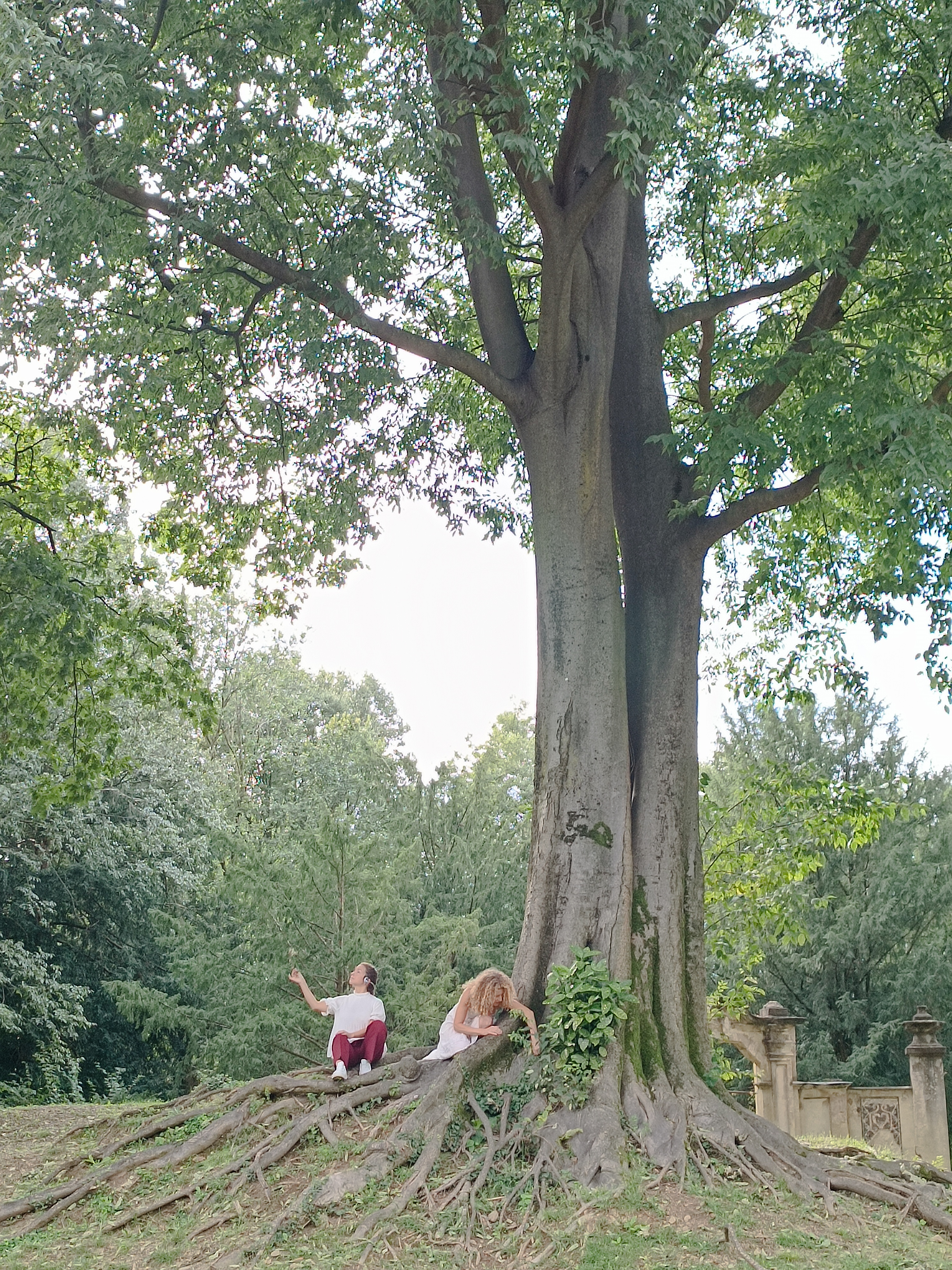
A centuries-old tree in the park

Villa Burba, also known as Villa Burba Cornaggia Medici, is a 17th-century villa and garden complex located in the town of Rho, within the Metropolitan City of Milan, Lombardy, in Northern Italy. The villa's date of completion (1665) is inscribed on a fireplace in its main hall. It was originally built as a rural residence for local nobility and was later acquired by the Cornaggia Medici family in 1873.

The villa features elements of Lombard Baroque architecture, including a U-shaped layout with a central portico supported by three arches and paired columns, as well as decorative wrought-iron balconies, gates and railings. The complex also includes ancillary buildings such as a chapel, barns and stables, all of which have been restored.

Adjacent to the villa is a historic garden designed in the Baroque tradition, featuring formal pathways and a variety of rare and centuries-old plant species. The garden, which is seasonally open to the public, is recognized for its landscape and botanical value and was included in the ReGIS (Rete dei Giardini Storici) network in 2019.

Today, Villa Burba is owned and managed by the Municipality of Rho. Its right wing houses the public library, while the central and left wings, along with the restored rustico buildings, are used for exhibitions, cultural programming, and community events.

== History ==
Villa Burba was established in the second half of the 17th century as a rural estate for a noble family from Milan, during a period when the countryside surrounding the city became a favored location for aristocratic villas. While its early ownership remains uncertain, the original function was tied to agricultural management and seasonal leisure, typical of the Lombard villa tradition.

Throughout the 18th and early 19th centuries, the property underwent several changes of ownership and internal modifications. In 1873, it was acquired by the Cornaggia Medici family, who maintained the estate as a private residence and preserved much of its Baroque character. The family held the property until the early 20th century.

After a period of decline and partial disuse, the villa was acquired by the Municipality of Rho in the second half of the 20th century. In the following decades, restoration work was carried out on the main building and ancillary structures, resulting in a gradual transformation of the site into a public cultural space. At the end of the 1990s, parts of the complex had been adapted for civic functions, including a public library and spaces for exhibitions and educational activities.

== Architecture and site layout ==
Villa Burba reflects the architectural conventions of 17th-century Lombardy, later enriched with Baroque elements. Its layout includes a central main building with two side wings forming a courtyard, aligned along Corso Europa. The structure features a central hall of particular note, as well as late Baroque decorations including iron balconies, wrought-iron gates, and railings.

There are two entrances to this villa. The formal main entrance is from Corso Europa, and the secondary entrance is accessed through the adjoining park at the end of Via Papa Giovanni XXIII. Several restored service buildings, such as barns and stables, are arranged around the complex. The interior includes a symmetrical series of rooms and a large central salon that historically served for social functions.

The surrounding grounds were once part of the villa's rural estate, now include a public park covering approximately 13,000 square meters, which contributes to the tranquil atmosphere of this site and serves as a gathering place for the local community.

== Historic garden ==
The garden part of Villa Burba is situated behind the main building, accessible both from the central courtyard and through a secondary entrance on Via Papa Giovanni XXIII. This part reflects features of formal Italian garden design with geometric gravel paths, tree-lined walkways, and ornamental plantings.

The space includes mature trees, rare botanical specimens, and scattered statuary, particularly busts of female figures. A rectangular fountain with a stone basin and granite benches enclosure and a small artificial pond further emphasize the historical landscape character of this villa. While adapted for modern public use as a park, the garden retains stylistic and spatial continuity with its 17th- and 18th-century origins.

== Current use and management ==
Since 1966, Villa Burba has been owned and managed by the Municipality of Rho. After a period of neglect following World War II, the property underwent extensive restoration aimed at preserving its architectural integrity while adapting it for public use.

Today, the right wing of the villa is used for the Rho municipal public library, providing educational and cultural services to the local community. The central and left wings are used for cultural events, exhibitions, and civic functions. The former agricultural buildings (rustico structures) have been repurposed as event and meeting spaces.

The adjacent outside park is open to the public on a seasonal basis. Maintained by local authorities, it functions as a recreational green space and gathering area, offering cultural, social, and educational value to residents and visitors alike.

== See also ==
- Villa Litta, Lainate
- Baroque architecture
- Cultural heritage
- Cultural landscape
