= Villa Litta, Lainate =

Villa in Lainate, Italy

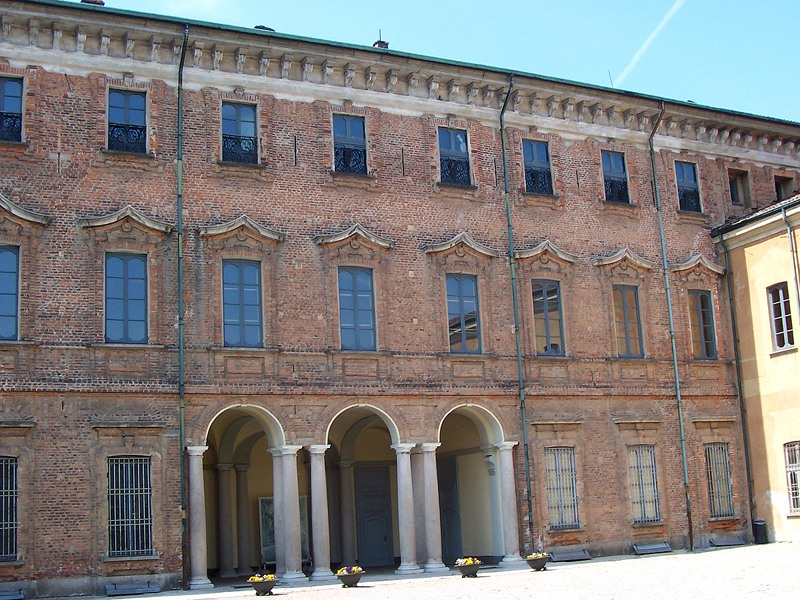
Facade of villa

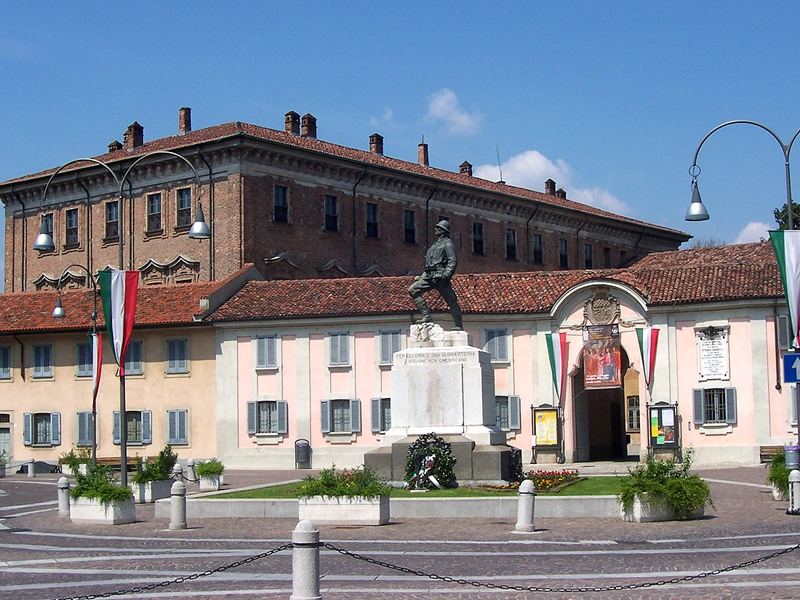
External entrance to villa, with three story brick main wing in background.

The Villa Lita, also called Villa Visconti Borromeo Litta is a 16th-century rural palace and park located in Lainate, just north of Milan, in the Province of Milan, Lombardy, Italy. It is known for its elaborate Nymphaeum integrated with water works and games.

== History ==
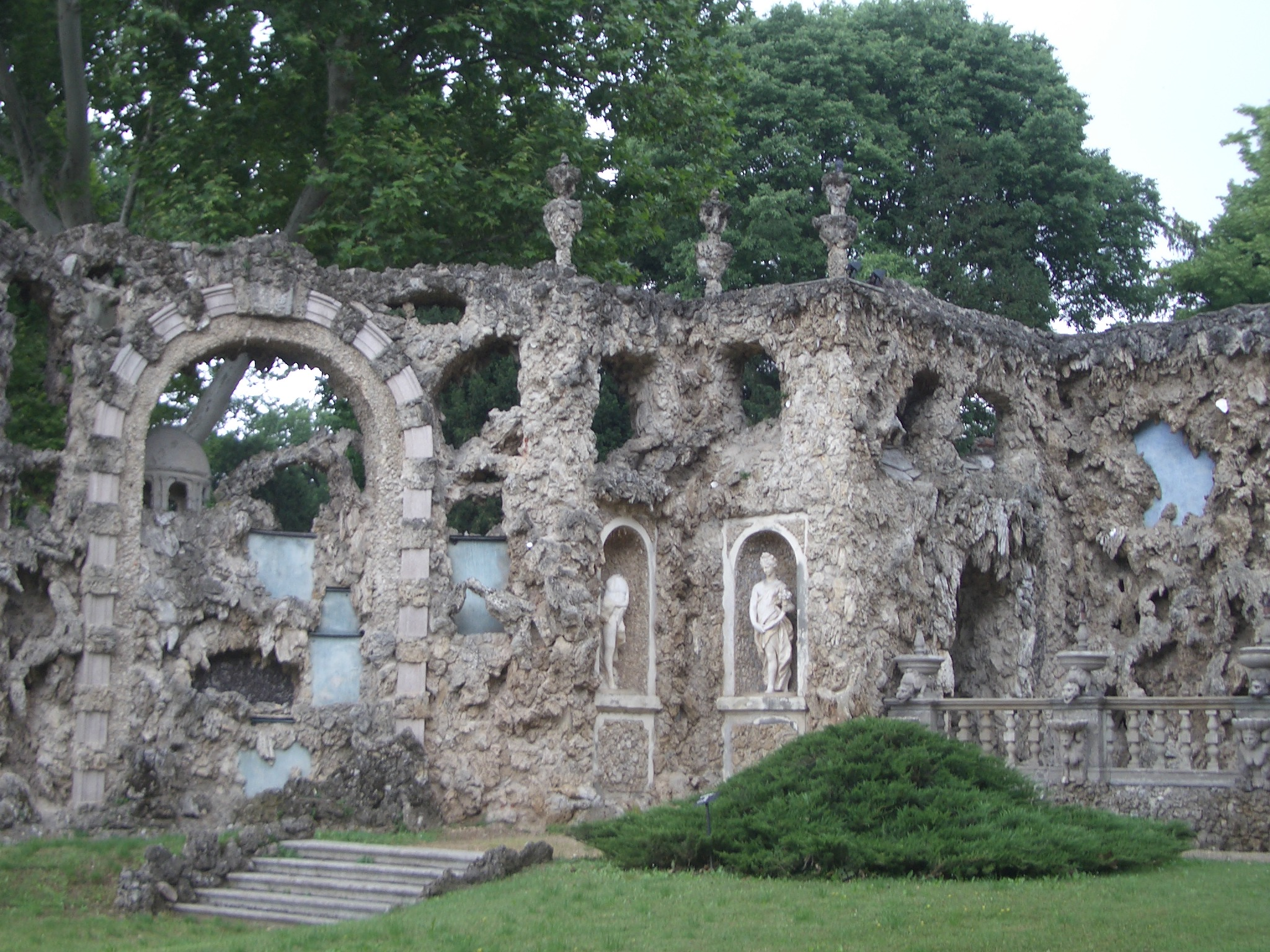
Portion of Nymphaeum

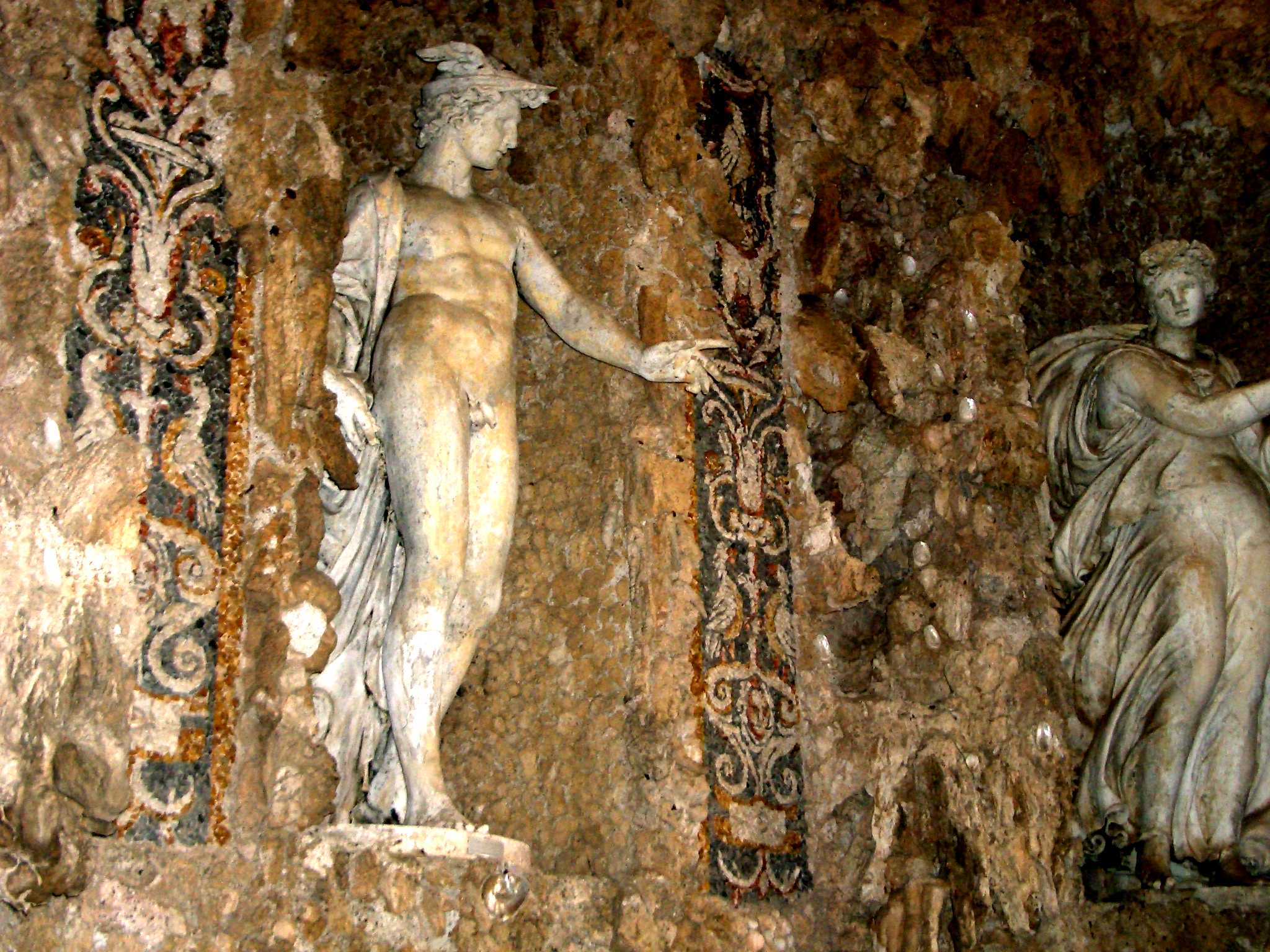
Atrium of Four Winds inside Nymphaeum

The villa was initially commissioned by Count Pirro the First Visconti Borromeo in the second half of the sixteenth century, build atop an older property. The count also built and conceived the Nymphaeum, designed by Martino Bassi and used to exhibit a collection of paintings, sculptures and curiosities. The mosaic decorations were designed by Camillo Procaccini, and the painter il Morazzone depicted the Mercury of the entrance hall.

Giulio Visconti Borromeo Arese, last heir of the dynasty, decided in the 1720s to build the "Quarto nuovo", closing the entrance courtyard, with a ballroom on the main floor. The Marquis Pompeo Litta, nephew of Giulio, in the 1750s rearranged the landscapes and hired Giuseppe Levati to decorate the dining room with stucco and frescoes. In the 19th century, the landscapes were rearranged to create an English landscape design, by Luigi Canonica.

The first restoration and re-activation of the water features are owed to Alberto Toselli who bought the property in 1932; however, the acquisition by the City of Lainate (1971) has opened the structure to the public.
