= Giuseppe Levati =

Italian painter (1739–1828)

Giuseppe Levati (1739–1828) was an Italian painter and designer of the late-Baroque and Neoclassicism period.

He was born at Concorezzo, near Milan. After initially working as a decorator, he specialized as an architectural landscape painter, attracted especially the perspectives of Bárbaro and Giampietro Zanotti. In 1802 he was elected director of the school of perspective at Milan. He executed architectural subjects and landscapes (vedute). He helped decorate the house of the Marquis Litta at Lainate; the residence of Count Borromeo, the archducal palace at Milan, and the palace at Monza. One of his pupils was Francesco Durelli.
