= Lombardy =

Region of Italy

Lombardy Lombardia (Italian) Lombardia (Lombard) (Note: Lombard spellings for the name include Lombardia in Classical Milanese orthography, some Eastern orthographies, Scriver Lombard and Noeuva Ortografia Lombarda; Lumbardia in Ticinese and Modern Western orthographies; and Lombardéa in other Eastern orthographies.)
- Region
- Flag Emblem

- Coordinates: 45°35′N 9°55′E
- Country: Italy
- Capital: Milan

Government
  - Type: Presidential system
  - Body: Regional Cabinet
  - President: Attilio Fontana (LN)
  - Legislature: Regional Council

Area
  - Total: 23,863.65 km^{2} (9,213.81 sq mi)

Population (2026)
  - Total: 10,065,694
  - Rank: 1st in Italy
  - Density: 421.8003/km^{2} (1,092.458/sq mi)
- Demonyms: English: Lombard; Italian: lombardo (man), lombarda (woman); Lombard: lombard (man), lombarda (woman)

GDP
  - Total: €504.730 billion (2024)
  - Per capita: €50,307 (2024)
- Time zone: UTC+1 (CET)
  - Summer (DST): UTC+2 (CEST)
- ISO 3166 code: IT-25
- HDI (2022): 0.920 very high · 4th of 21
- NUTS Region: ITC
- Website: regione.lombardia.it

Lombardy (Note: English pronunciation: /ˈlɒmbərdi, ˈlʌm-/ LOM-bər-dee, LUM-.) (Lombard and Italian: Lombardia; (Note: Italian pronunciation: [lombarˈdiːa], Western Lombard pronunciation: [lũbarˈdiːa], Eastern Lombard pronunciation: [lombarˈdi.a, -ˈde.a].) Romansh: Lumbardia) is an administrative region of Italy that covers 23,844 km^{2} (9,206 sq mi); it is located in northern Italy and with a population of about 10 million is the most populous region, constituting more than one-sixth of Italy's population. Lombardy is located between the Alps mountain range and tributaries of the river Po, and includes Milan, its capital and largest city, whose metropolitan area is the largest in the country and among the largest in the EU.

Its territory is divided into 1,501 municipalities (the region with the largest number of municipalities in the entire national territory), distributed among 12 administrative subdivisions (11 provinces plus the Metropolitan City of Milan). The region ranks first in Italy in terms of population, population density, and number of municipalities, while it is fourth in terms of surface area, after Sicily, Piedmont, and Sardinia.

It is the second-most populous region of the European Union (EU), and the second region of the European Union by nominal GDP. Lombardy is the leading region of Italy in terms of economic importance, contributing to approximately one-fifth of the national gross domestic product (GDP). It is also a member of the Four Motors for Europe, an international economic organization whose other members are Baden-Württemberg in Germany, Catalonia in Spain, and Auvergne-Rhône-Alpes in France. Milan is the economic capital of Italy and a global centre for business, fashion, and finance.

Of the 58 UNESCO World Heritage Sites in Italy, 11 are in Lombardy, tying it with Castile and León in northwest-central Spain.

== Etymology ==
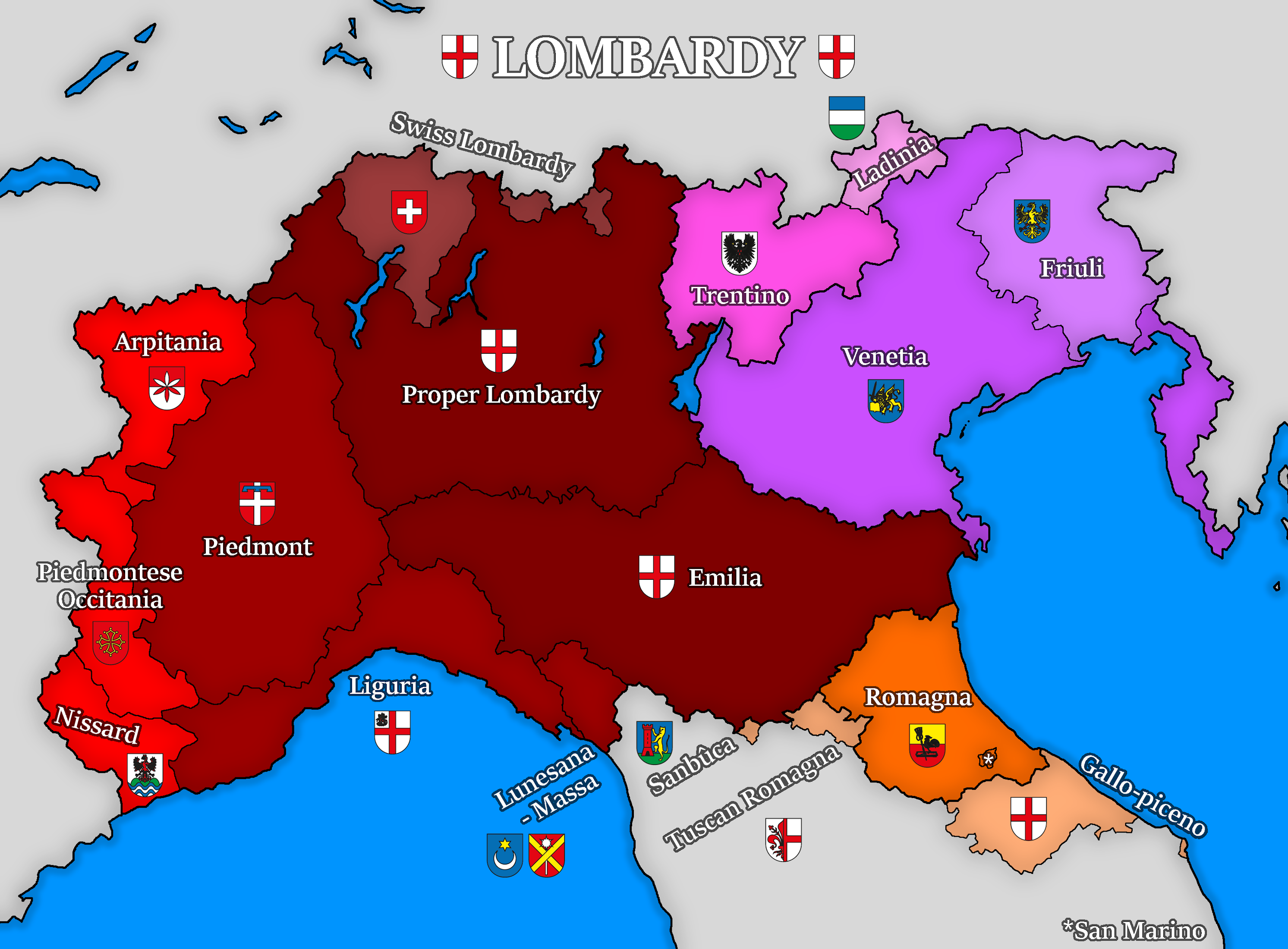
Map of Historical Lombardy

The name Lombardy comes from Lombard, which is derived from Late Latin Longobardus, Langobardus ("a Lombard"), which derived from the Proto-Germanic elements *langaz + *bardaz; equivalent to long beard. According to some scholars, the second element derives from Proto-Germanic *bardǭ, *barduz ("axe"), related to German Barte.

The name of the region derives from the name of the people of the Lombards who arrived in Italy in 568 and made Pavia their capital. During the Early Middle Ages, "Lombardy" referred to the Kingdom of the Lombards (Latin: Regnum Langobardorum). It was ruled by the Germanic Lombard raiders, who controlled most of early Christian Italy since the Lombard invasion of Italy of Byzantine Italy in 568, until the fall of Pavia, in 774 by Charlemagne on the Pope's behalf. As such, "Lombardy" and "Italy" were nearly interchangeable; by the mid-8th century, the Lombards ruled everywhere except the Papal possessions around Rome—roughly modern Lazio and northern Umbria—Venice and some Byzantine possessions in the south—southern Apulia and Calabria; some coastal settlements including Amalfi, Gaeta, Naples and Sorrento; Sicily and Sardinia; their culture is foundational to Italy in the Middle Ages. The term was also used until around 965 in the form Λογγοβαρδία (Longobardia) as the name for the territory roughly covering modern Apulia, which the Byzantines had recovered from the Lombard rump state Duchy of Benevento.

== History ==
=== Prehistory and antiquity ===
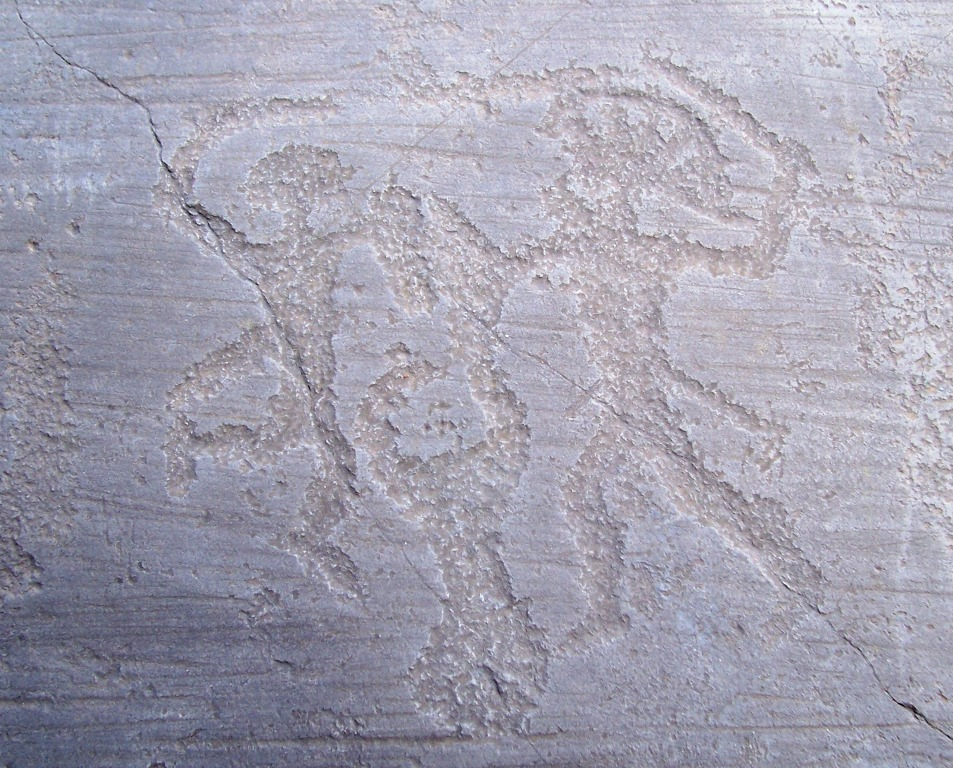
A couple in duel with a "symbol" in the middle depicted in the Rock Drawings in Valcamonica. The Rock Drawings in Valcamonica are the largest collections of prehistoric petroglyphs in the world.

From archaeological findings of ceramics, arrows, axes, and carved stones, the area of current-day Lombardy has been settled at least since the second millennium BC. Well-preserved rock drawings left by ancient Camuni in the Valcamonica depicting animals, people, and symbols were made over 8,000 years before the Iron Age, based on about 300,000 records.

The many artefacts found in a necropolis near Lake Maggiore and the Ticino demonstrate the presence of the Golasecca Bronze Age culture that prospered in western Lombardy between the ninth and the 4th centuries BC. In the following centuries, Lombardy was inhabited by different peoples; the Etruscans founded the city of Mantua and spread the use of writing. It was the seat of the Celtic Canegrate culture starting from the 13th century BC, and later of the Celtic Golasecca culture. From the 5th century BC, the area was invaded by more Celtic Gallic tribes coming from north of the Alps. These people settled in several cities including Milan and extended their rule to the Adriatic Sea. Celtic development was halted by the Roman expansion in the Po Valley from the 3rd century BC. After centuries of struggle, at the end of the 2nd century B.C., the entirety of modern-day Lombardy became a Roman province called Gallia Cisalpina—"Gaul on the inner side (with respect to Rome) of the Alps".

The Roman culture and language overwhelmed the former civilization in the following years, and Lombardy became one of the most developed and richest areas of Italy with the construction of roads and the development of agriculture and trade. Important figures were born here, such as Pliny the Elder (in Como) and Virgil (in Mantua). In late antiquity the strategic role of Lombardy was emphasised by the move of the capital of the Western Empire to Mediolanum (Milan). Here, in 313 AD, Roman Emperor Constantine issued the famous Edict of Milan, which gave freedom of confession to all religions within the Roman Empire.

=== Kingdom of the Lombards ===
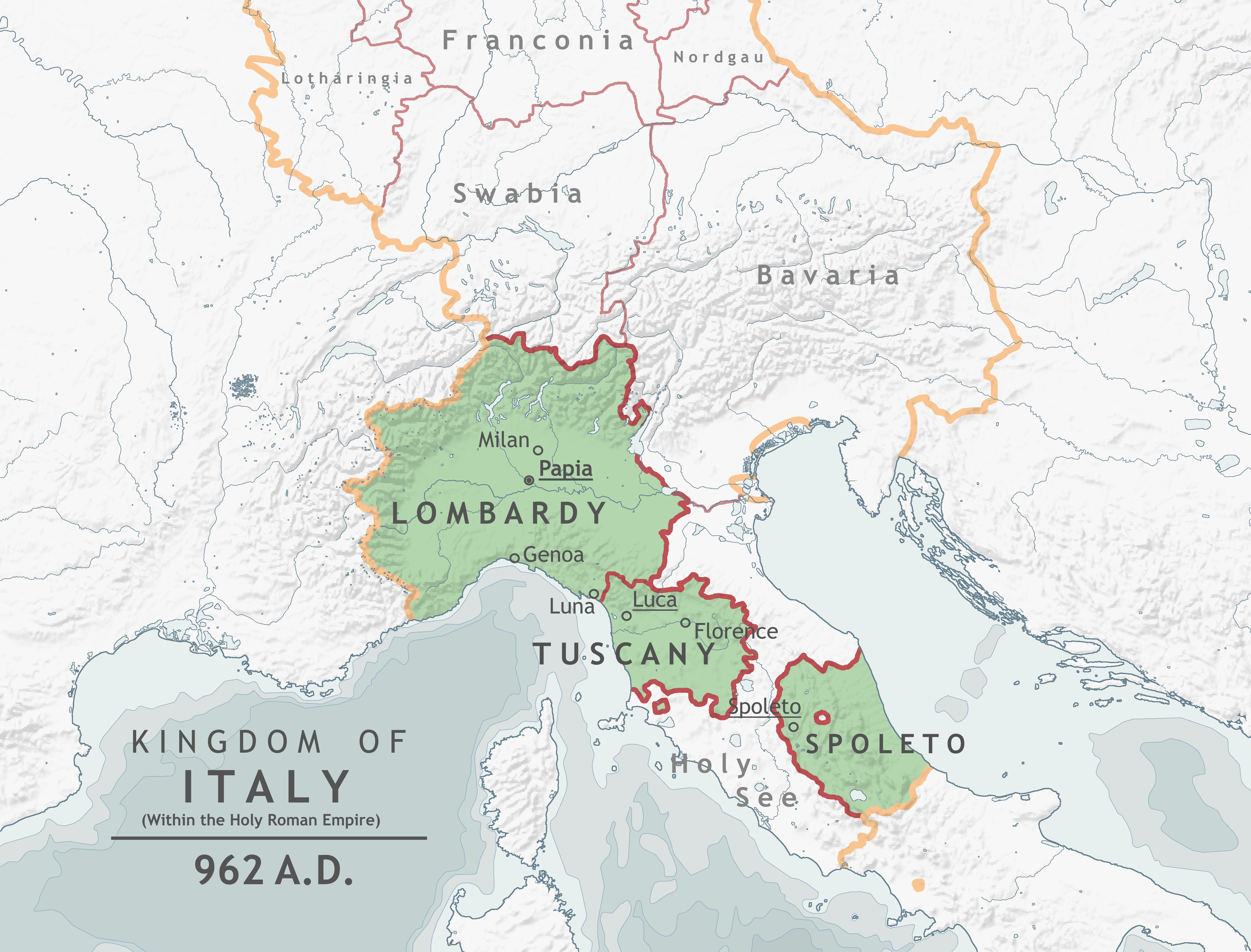
The Kingdom of Italy within the Holy Roman Empire in 962

During and after the fall of the Western Empire, Lombardy heavily suffered from destruction brought about by a series of invasions by tribal peoples. After 540, Pavia became the permanent capital of the Ostrogothic Kingdom, the fixed site of the court and the royal treasury. The last and most effective invasion was that of the Germanic Lombards or Longobards, whose nation migrated to the region from the Carpathian basin in fear of the conquering Pannonian Avars in 568. The Lombards' long-lasting reign, with its capital in Pavia, gave the current name to the region. There was a close relationship between the Frankish, Bavarian and Lombard nobility for many centuries.

After the initial struggles, relationships between the Lombard people and the Gallo-Roman peoples improved. The Lombard language and culture was integrated with the Latin culture, leaving evidence in many names, the legal code and laws. The Lombards became intermixed with the Roman population owing to their relatively smaller number. The end of Lombard rule came in 774, when the Frankish king Charlemagne conquered Pavia, deposed Desiderius the last Lombard king, and annexed the Kingdom of Italy—mostly northern and central present-day Italy—to his newly established Holy Roman Empire. Charlemagne was crowned by the Pope on 25 December 800. The former Lombard dukes and nobles were replaced by other German vassals, prince-bishops and marquises. The entire northern part of the Italian peninsula continued to be called "Lombardy" and its population "Lombards" throughout the following centuries.

=== Communes and the Empire ===
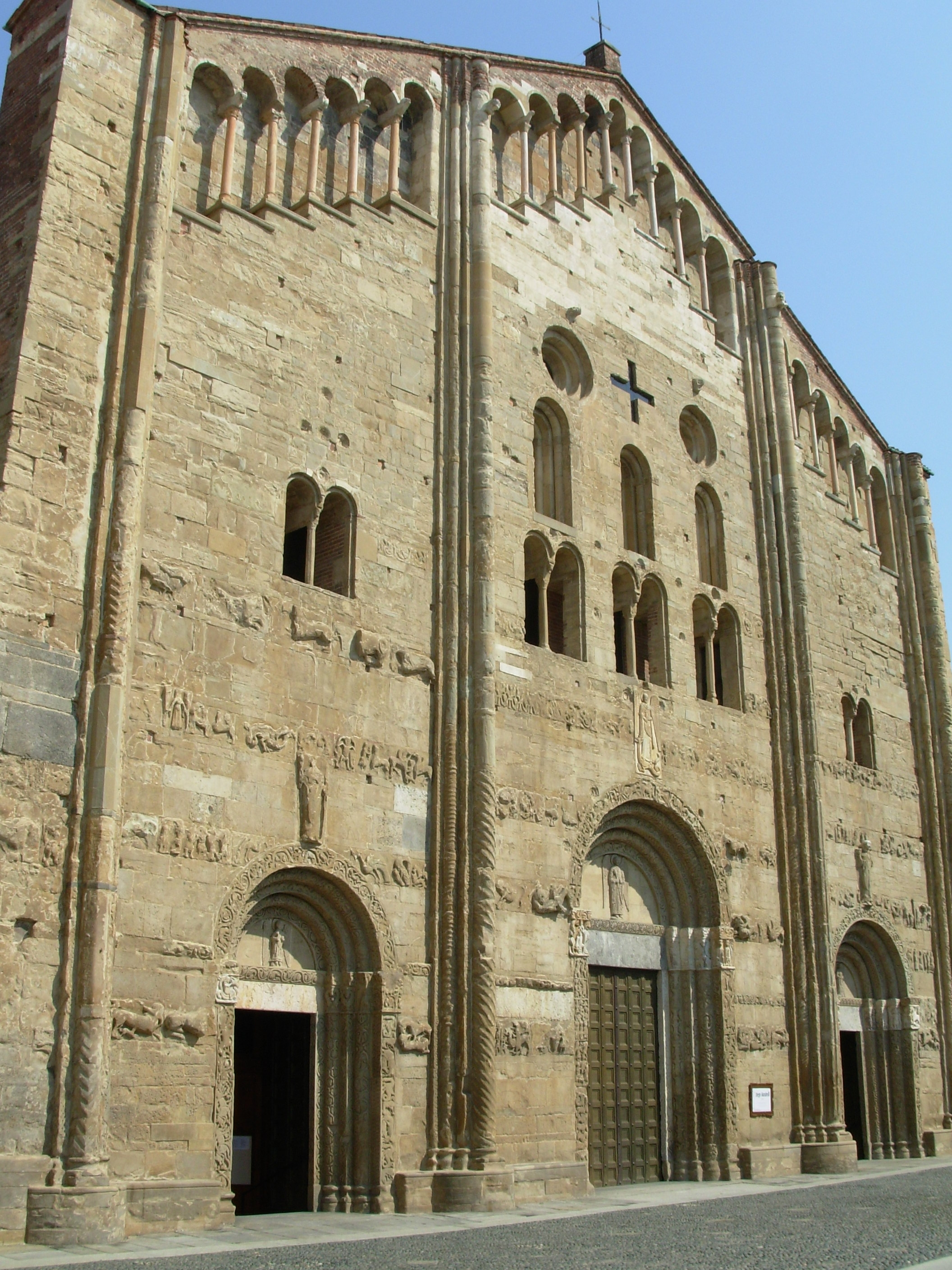
San Michele Maggiore, Pavia, where almost all the kings of Italy were crowned up to Frederick Barbarossa

In the 10th century, Lombardy, although formally under the rule of the Holy Roman Empire, was included in the kingdom of Italy, of which Pavia remained the capital until 1024. Starting gradually in the late-11th century, Lombardy became divided into many small, autonomous city-states, the medieval communes. Also in the 11th century, the region's economy underwent a significant boom due to improved trading, sartorial manufacturing of silk and wool, and agricultural conditions; arms manufacturing for the purpose of defensive army development, by the German imperial divisions of Guelphs (Welfen) defending the Pope and Ghibellins (Wibellingen) defending the Emperor, became a significant factor. As in other areas of Italy, this led to a growing self-acknowledgement of the cities, whose increasing wealth made them able to defy the traditional feudal supreme power that was represented by the German emperors and their local legates.

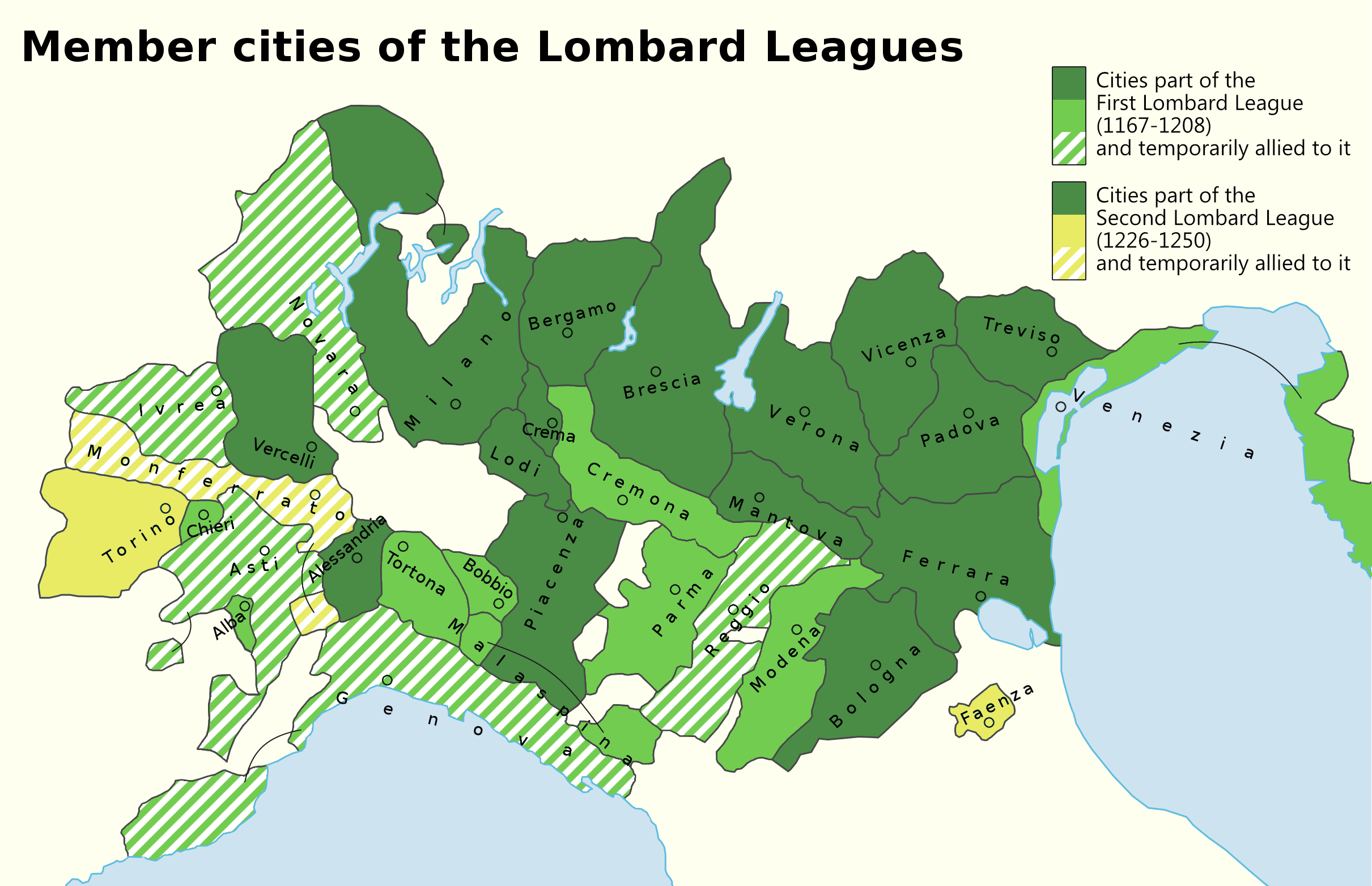
Member cities of the first and second Lombard League

This process peaked in the 12th and 13th centuries, when Lombard Leagues formed by allied cities of Lombardy, usually led by Milan, defeated the Hohenstaufen Emperor Frederick I, at Legnano but not his grandson Frederick II at Battle of Cortenuova. Although having the military purpose as preponderant, the Lombard League also had its own stable government, considered one of the first examples of confederation in Europe. Subsequently, among the local city-states, a process of consolidation took place, and by the end of the 14th century, two signoria emerged as rival hegemons in Lombardy; Milan and Mantua.

=== Renaissance duchies of Milan and Mantua ===
The Viscontis' dominions in the 14th century, before the foundation of the Duchy of Milan

In the 15th century, the Duchy of Milan was one of the wealthiest states during the Renaissance. Milan and Mantua became centres of the Renaissance, whose culture with people such as Leonardo da Vinci and Andrea Mantegna, and works of art such as da Vinci's The Last Supper were highly regarded. The enterprising class of the communes extended its trade and banking activities well into northern Europe; the metonym "Lombard" designated a merchant or banker from northern Italy, for example Lombard Street, London.

The name "Lombardy" came to denote the whole of northern Italy until the 15th century and sometimes later. From the 14th century onward, the instability created by the internal and external struggles ended in the creation of noble seigniories, the most significant of whom were the Viscontis (later Sforzas) in Milan and of the Gonzagas in Mantua. This wealth, however, attracted the now-more-organised armies of national powers such as France and Austria, which waged a lengthy battle for Lombardy in the late 15th to early 16th centuries.

=== Late-Middle Ages, Renaissance and Enlightenment ===
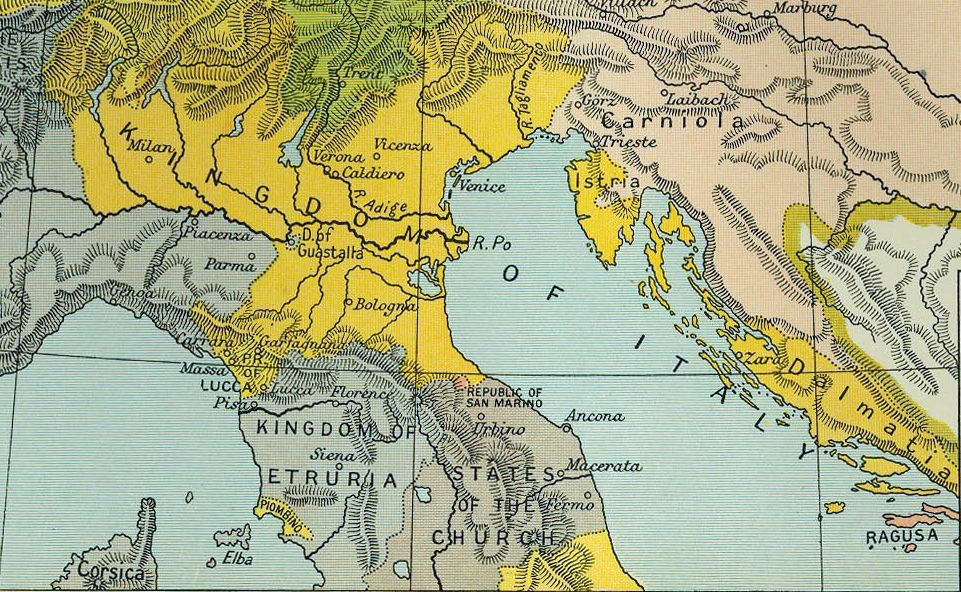
The Napoleonic Kingdom of Italy in 1807, having Milan as its capital, with Istria and Dalmatia, shown in yellow

After the Battle of Pavia, the Duchy of Milan became a possession of the Habsburgs of Spain. The eastern part of modern-day Lombardy, including the cities Bergamo and Brescia, was controlled by the Republic of Venice, which had begun to extend its influence in the area from the 14th century onwards. Between the mid-15th century and the battle of Marignano in 1515, the northern part of east Lombardy from Airolo to Chiasso (modern Ticino), and the Valtellina valley came under possession of the Old Swiss Confederacy.

Pestilences like that of 1628–1630, which Alessandro Manzoni described in his I promessi sposi (The Betrothed), and the general decline of Italy's economy in the 17th and 18th centuries halted further development of Lombardy. In 1706 the Austrian Empire came to power.

Austrian rule was interrupted in the late-18th century by the French; under Napoleon, Lombardy became the centre of the Cisalpine Republic and of the Kingdom of Italy, both of which were puppet states of France's First Empire, with Milan as capital and Napoleon as head of state. During this period, Lombardy regained Valtellina from Switzerland.

=== Modern era ===
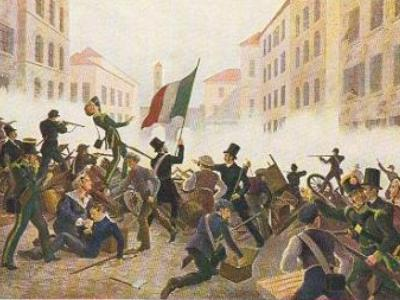
The Five Days of Milan, 1848

The restoration of Austrian rule in 1815 as the Kingdom of Lombardy–Venetia was characterised by a struggle with the new ideals introduced by the Napoleonic era. Lombardy was then an important centre of the Risorgimento, with the Five Days of Milan in March 1848, the Ten Days of Brescia in 1849, the Belfiore martyrs in Mantua in the years between 1851 and 1853. The annexation of Lombardy to the Kingdom of Piedmont-Sardinia occurred following the Second Italian War of Independence in 1859, a war during which Lombardy was the main theatre of battle (battles of Montebello, Palestro, Magenta, Solferino and San Fermo).

In 1861, with the proclamation of the Kingdom of Italy, Lombardy became part of the modern Italian state, except for the central-eastern part of the province of Mantua which was annexed in 1866 after the Third Italian War of Independence. Regarding the battle of Solferino, it was during this conflict that Henry Dunant took the initiative to create the Red Cross. After the annexation of Mantua, Lombardy achieved its present-day territorial shape by adding the Oltrepò Pavese, formerly the southern part of the Province of Novara, to the Province of Pavia.

=== Contemporary era ===
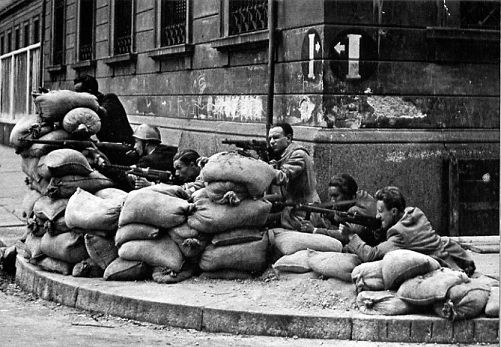
Italian partisans in Milan during the liberation of Italy, April 1945

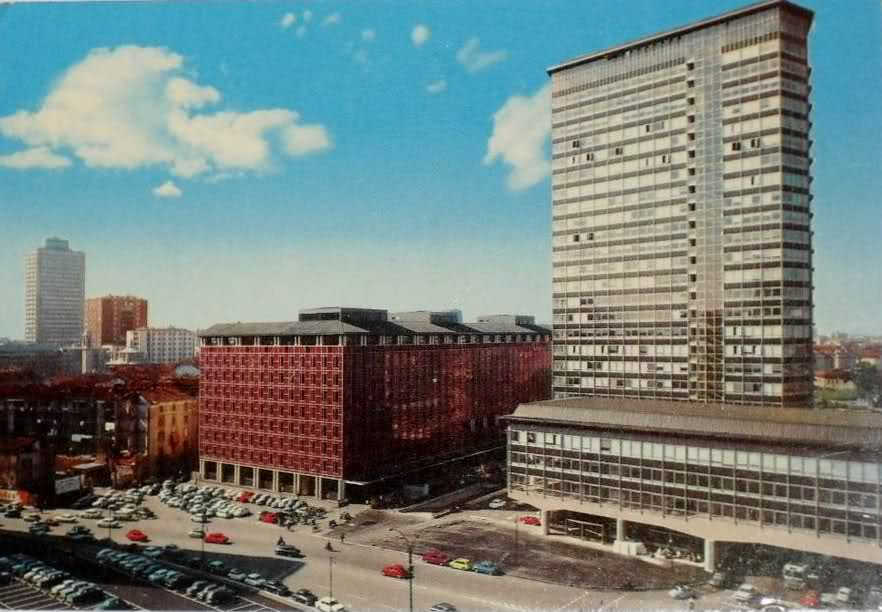
Skyscrapers and large buildings in the 1960s, such as that of the Centro Direzionale di Milano, iconographically represent the Italian economic miracle.

The Alpine front of World War I crossed the eastern Lombardy Alpine side, and in the post-war period Milan was the centre of the Italian Fasces of Combat. Milan then became the Gold Medal of Military Valor for the Italian resistance movement during the Italian Civil War after its liberation from fascism during the World War II, while the partisan resistance spread across the valleys and provinces.

Following the historical borders, in 1948 the administrative region of Lombardy was prefigured as part of the newly formed Italian Republic. In the years of the Italian economic miracle, Milan was one of the poles of the "industrial triangle" of northern Italy formed by the cities of Turin-Milan-Genoa. The Years of Lead had wide relevance in Lombardy, with the Piazza Fontana bombing in Milan in 1969 and the Piazza della Loggia bombing in Brescia in 1974.

In the 1980s, Milan became a symbol of the country's economic growth, and a symbol of the economic-financial rampantism of the so-called "Milano da bere", literally "Milan to be drunk", while the Milanese socialist group of Bettino Craxi was in the national government. The city of Milan, in the early 1990s, was the origin of the series of scandals known as Tangentopoli which emerged from the judicial investigations of the Milanese prosecutor's office known as Mani pulite, which then spread to the rest of the country.

In early 2020, Lombardy was severely affected by the COVID-19 pandemic, in which Italy was one of the worst-affected countries in Europe. Several towns were quarantined from 22 February after community transmission was documented in Lombardy and Veneto the previous day. The entirety of Lombardy was placed under lockdown on 8 March, followed by all of Italy the following day, making Italy the first country to implement a nationwide lockdown in response to the epidemic, which the World Health Organization (WHO) declared a pandemic on 11 March. The lockdown was extended twice, and the region toughened restrictions on 22 March, banning outdoor exercise and the use of vending machines, but from the beginning of May, following a reported decrease in the number of active cases, restrictions were gradually relaxed.

== Geography ==
Lombardy has a surface area of 23,861 km^{2} (9,213 sq mi), and is the fourth-largest region of Italy, after Sicily, Piedmont, and Sardinia. It is bordered by Canton Ticino and Canton Grisons of Switzerland to the north, and by the Italian regions of Trentino-Alto Adige/Südtirol and Veneto to the east, Emilia-Romagna to the south and Piedmont to the west.

Lombardy's northern border lies between the Valtellina and the valleys of the Rhine and the Inn. To the east, Lake Garda and the Mincio separate Lombardy from the other Italian regions, as does the Po River in the south, with the exception of the province of Mantua and Oltrepò Pavese. The western boundary is formed by the Lake Maggiore and the Ticino river, except for Lomellina. Lombardy has three natural zones: mountains, hills and plains—the last being divided into Alta (high plains) and Bassa (low plains).

=== Soils ===
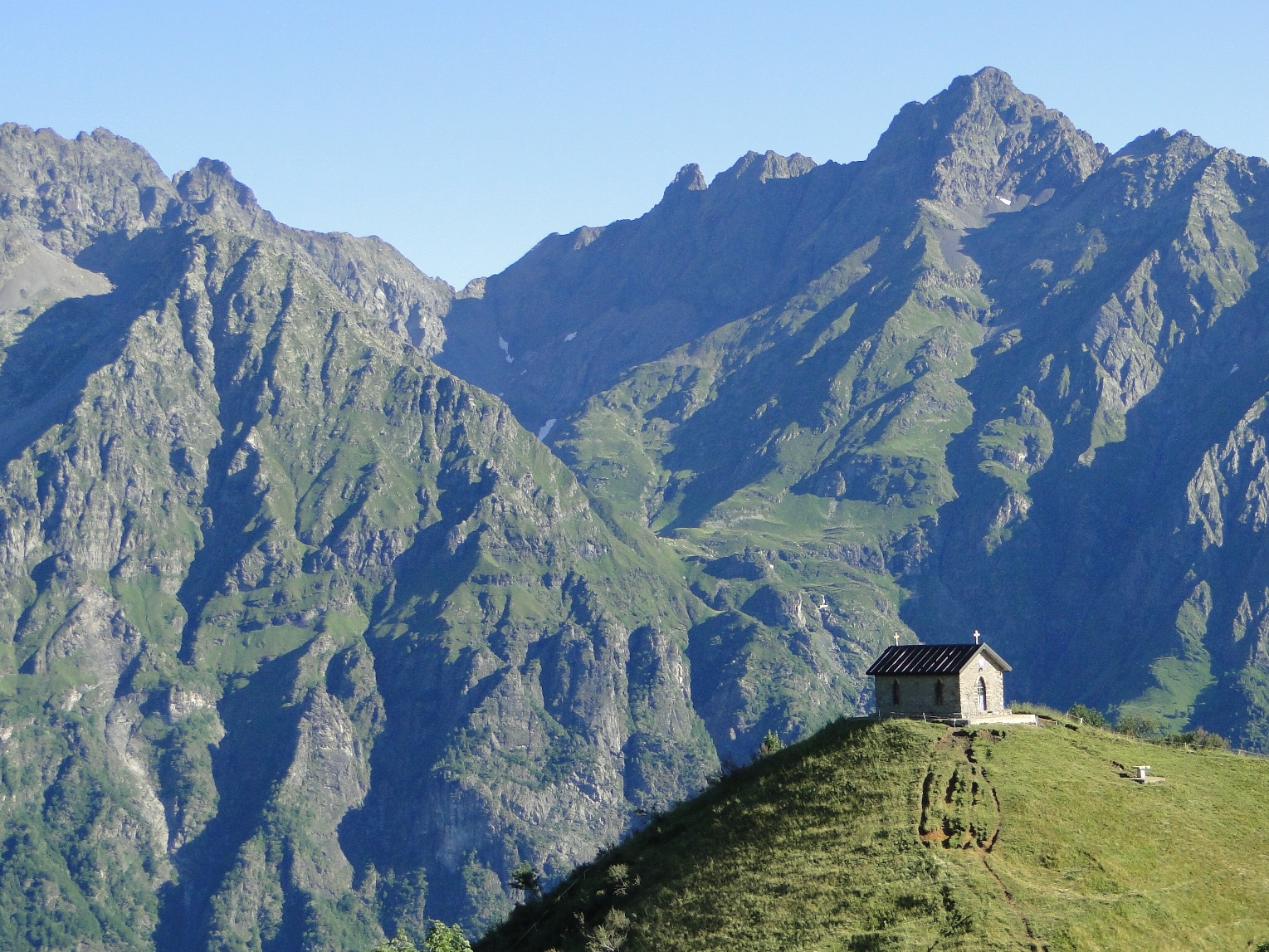
Pizzo Coca is the highest peak in the Orobic Alps (3,050 m (10,010 ft)).

The surface area of Lombardy is divided almost equally between the plains (which represent approximately 47% of the territory) and the mountainous areas (which represent 41%). The remaining 12% of the region is hilly.

The orography of Lombardy is characterised by three distinct belts; a northern mountainous belt constituted by the Alpine relief, a central piedmont area of mostly alluvial pebbly soils, and the Lombard section of the Padan Plain in the south of the region. The main valleys are Val Camonica, Val Trompia, Valle Sabbia, Valtellina, Val Seriana, Val Brembana, Valsassina, and Valassina.

The most important mountainous area is the Alpine zone, which includes the Lepontine and Rhaetian Alps (4,020 m (13,190 ft)), which derive their name, respectively, from the Raeti, a population of Etruscan origin who took refuge in the Central Alps during the Celtic invasion of the Italian peninsula, and from the Ligurian population of the Lepontii, who were settled in this area and then subjugated by the Roman emperor Augustus, the Orobic Alps (3,050 m (10,010 ft)) which derive their name from the Orobii, population of Ligurian or perhaps Celtic origin, the Ortler Alps and the Adamello massif. It is followed by the Alpine foothills zone Prealps, which are followed by hills that smooth the transition from the mountain to the Po Valley, the main peaks of which are the Grigna Group (2,410 m (7,910 ft)), Resegone 1,875 m (6,152 ft), and Presolana (2,521 m (8,271 ft)).

The plains of Lombardy, which are formed by alluvial deposits, can be divided into the Alta—an upper, permeable ground zone in the north—and the Bassa, a lower zone dotted by the line of fontanili, where spring waters rise from impermeable ground. Inconsistent with the three distinctions above is the small sub-region of Oltrepò Pavese, which is formed by the Apennine foothills beyond the Po, and Lomellina, an area particularly renowned for its rice paddies.

=== Hydrography ===
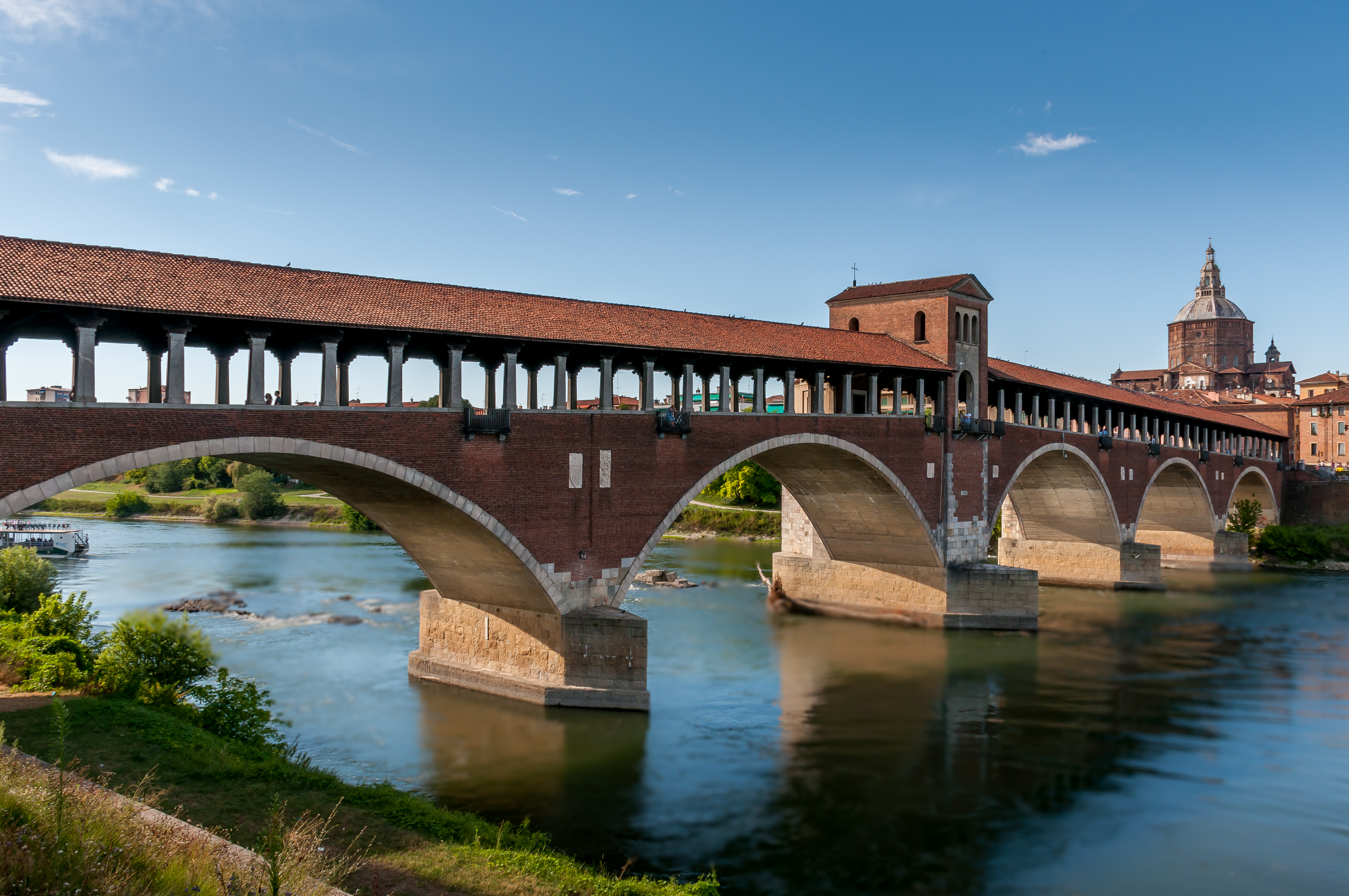
Ponte Coperto in Pavia over the Ticino river

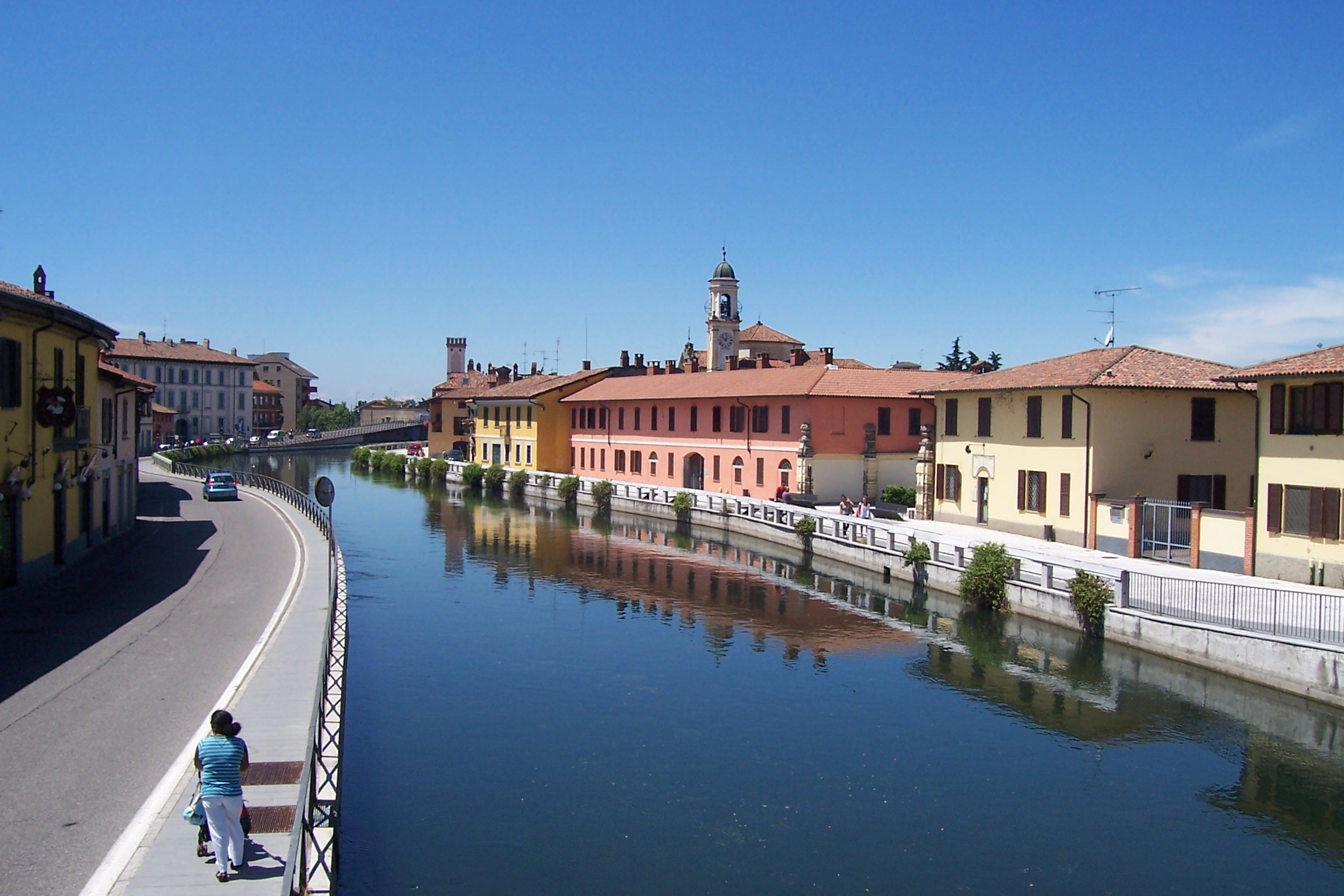
Naviglio Grande in Gaggiano

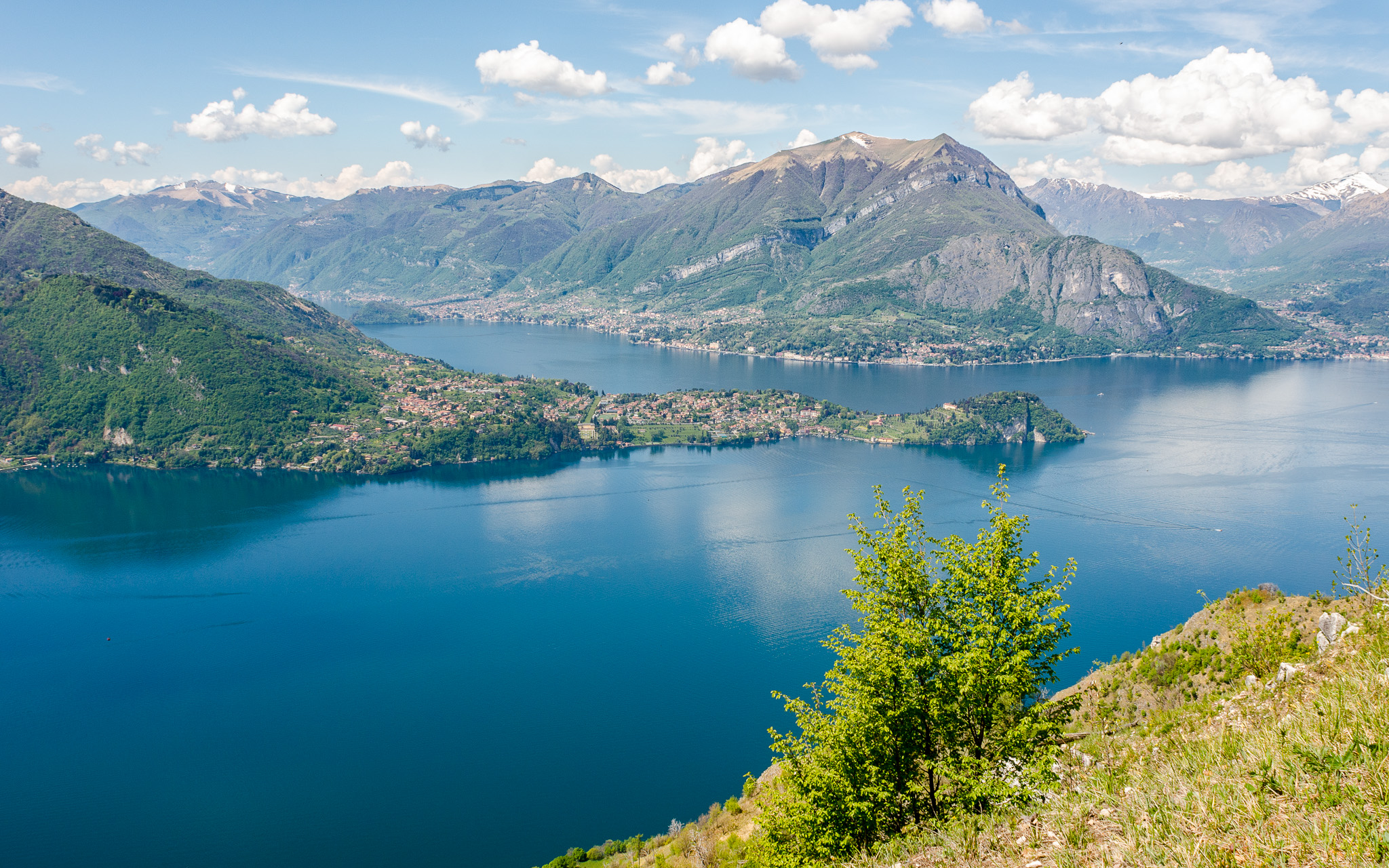
Panoramic view of Lake Como with the Alps and Bellagio

The Po marks the southern border of the region for approximately 210 km (130 mi); its major tributaries are the Ticino, which rises in the Val Bedretto in Switzerland and joins the Po near Pavia, the Olona, the Lambro, the Adda, the Oglio and the Mincio.

The numerous lakes of Lombardy are all of glacial origin and are located in the northern highlands. From west to east, these lakes are: Lake Maggiore, Lake Lugano (both shared with Switzerland), Lake Como, Lake Iseo, Lake Idro, and Lake Garda (the largest lake in Italy). South of the Alps lies a succession of low hills of morainic origin that were formed during the Last Glacial Period, as well as small, barely fertile plateaux with typical heaths and conifer woods. A minor mountainous area, the Oltrepò Pavese lies in the Apennines range south of the Po.

The navigli are a system of interconnected canals in and around Milan, dating back as far as the Middle Ages. The system consists of five canals: Naviglio Grande, Naviglio Pavese, Naviglio Martesana, Naviglio di Paderno, and Naviglio di Bereguardo. The first three were connected through Milan via the Fossa Interna, also known as the Inner Ring. The urban section of the Naviglio Martesana was covered over at the beginning of the 1930s, together with the entire Inner Ring, thus sounding the death knell for the northeastern canals.

=== Alpine passes ===
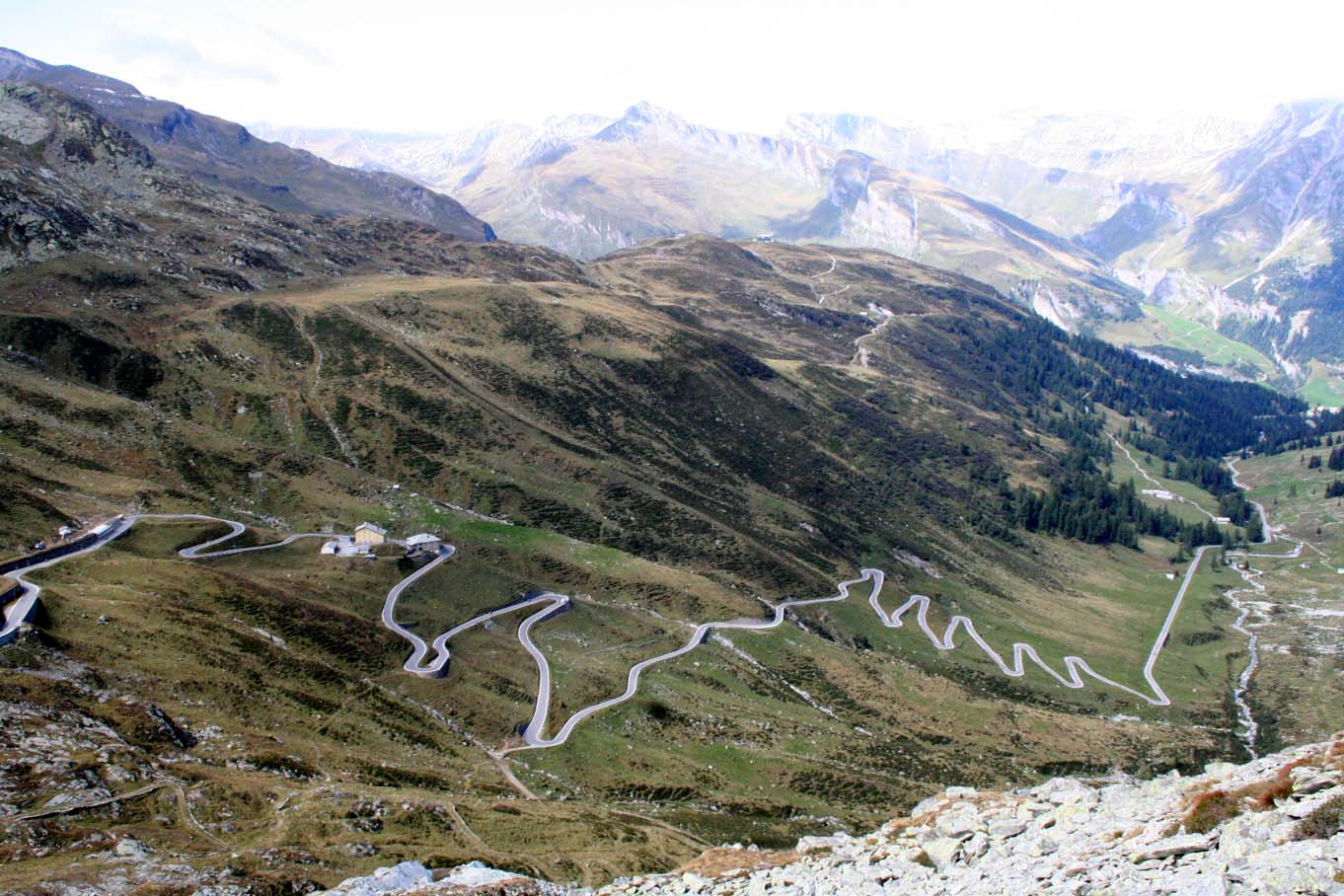
The northern side of the Splügen Pass

The Lombard Alpine valleys are wider than those found in the Alps in Piedmont and Aosta Valley. Most of them are crossed by streams that descend towards the Po Valley, forming rivers that then flow into the Po on the hydrographic left. Thanks to the width of their valleys, the Lombard Alpine passes, although they are at a high altitude, are easily accessible.

The most important international passes found in the Lombard Alps, which connect the region with Switzerland are the Splügen Pass (2,118 m (6,949 ft)), the Maloja Pass (1,815 m (5,955 ft)) and the Bernina Pass (2,323 m (7,621 ft)), with the latter two which are located in Swiss territory. The most important national passes are the Stelvio Pass (2,759 m (9,052 ft)) and the Tonale Pass (1,883 m (6,178 ft)), which connect Lombardy with Trentino-Alto Adige. These Alpine passes are also of great importance from a historical point of view, given that they have always allowed easy communication between Lombardy and its bordering territories. This has resulted in constant commercial traffic, which contributed to the development of the region.

=== Flora and fauna ===
The protected areas of Lombardy

The plains have been intensively cultivated for centuries, and little of the original environment remains. The most common trees are elm, alder, sycamore, poplar, willow, and hornbeam. In the area of the foothills lakes, however, olive, cypresses, and larches grow, as do varieties of subtropical flora such as magnolia, azalea and acacia. Numerous species of endemic flora in the Prealpine area include some species of saxifrage, Lombardy garlic, groundsel, and bellflowers.

The highlands are characterised by the typical vegetation of the Italian Alps. At and below approximately 1,100 m (3,600 ft), oaks or broadleaf trees grow; on the mountain slopes between 2,000 and 2,100 m (6,600 and 6,900 ft), beech trees grow at the lowest limits, with conifer woods higher up. Shrubs such as rhododendron, dwarf pine, and juniper are native to the summit zone beyond 2,200 m (7,200 ft).

Lombardy includes many protected areas. The most important is Stelvio National Park, established in 1935—the fourth-largest Italian natural park, with typically alpine wildlife such as red deer, roe deer, ibex, chamois, foxes, ermine, and golden eagles; and the Parco naturale lombardo della Valle del Ticino, which was instituted in 1974 on the Lombard side of the River Ticino to protect one of the last major examples of fluvial forest in northern Italy. There have also been efforts to protect the endangered Italian agile frog. The Parco naturale lombardo della Valle del Ticino is the first Italian regional park to be established as well as the first European river park. In 2022, the two parks were included by UNESCO in the World Network of Biosphere Reserves.

Other parks in the region are the Campo dei Fiori and the Cinque Vette Park, both of which are located in the Province of Varese. The system of protected areas in Lombardy consists of one national park, 24 regional parks, 65 natural reserves and 30 natural monuments. In total, protected areas cover more than 27% of the regional territory.

=== Climate ===
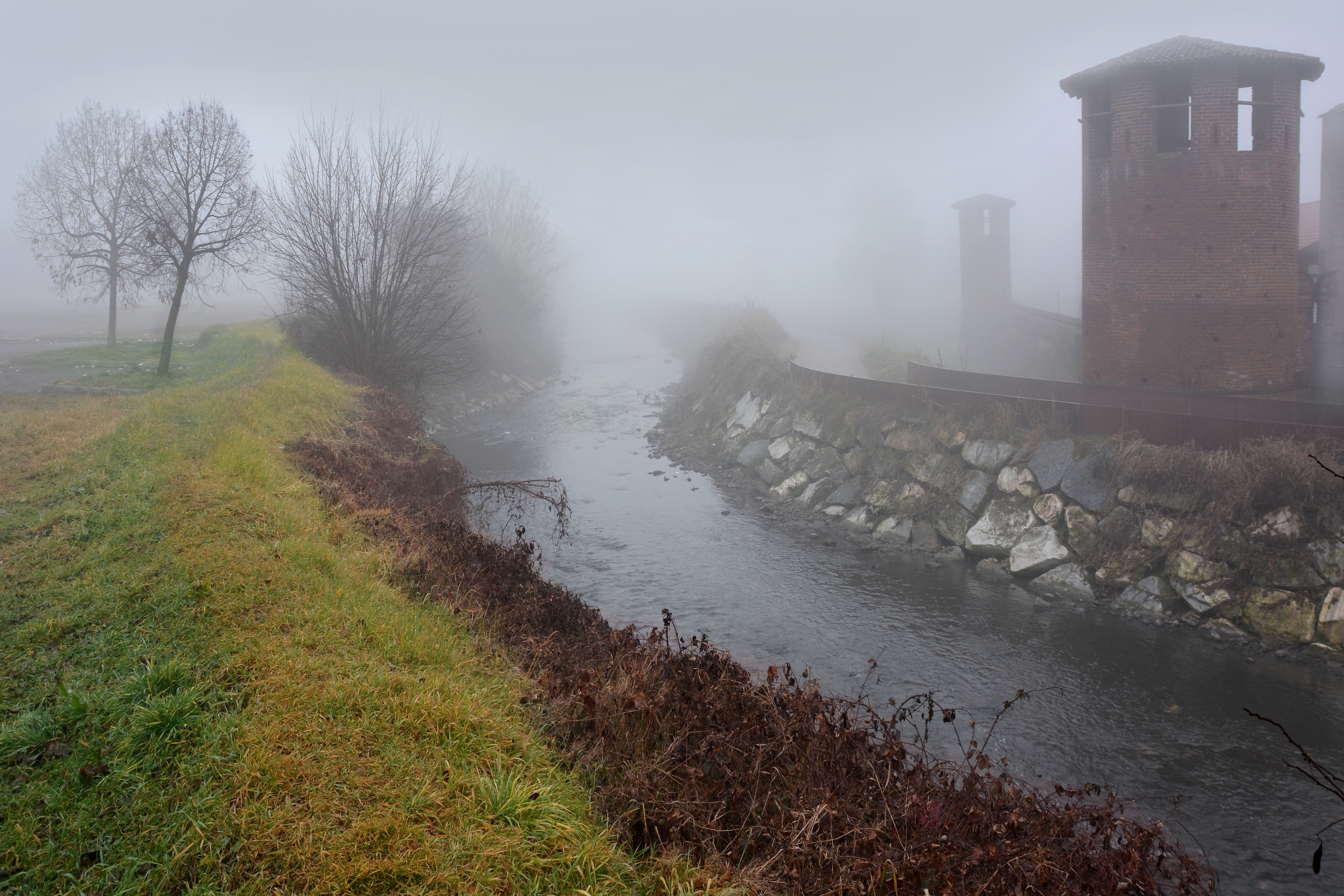
Fog at the Visconti Castle of Legnano

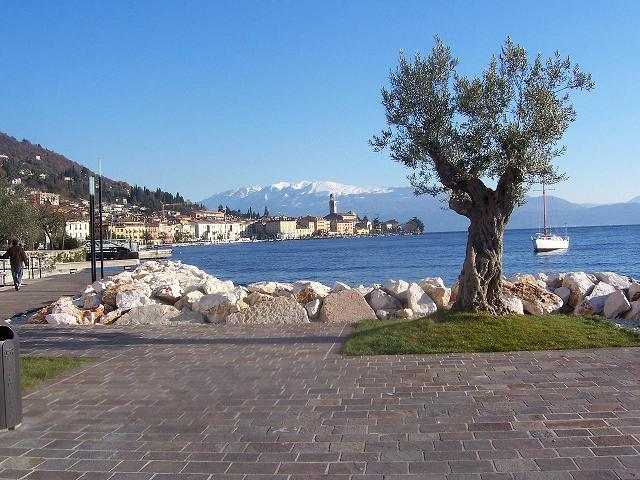
An olive tree on the shores of Lake Garda. On Lake Garda, there is a "Mediterranean" microclimate which allows the cultivation of olive trees and the production of olive oil.

Lombardy has a wide array of climates due to variations in elevation, proximity to inland water basins, and large metropolitan areas. The climate is mainly humid subtropical (Köppen Cfa), especially in the plains, though with significant variations from the Köppen model, especially in the normally long, damp, and cold winters. There is high seasonal temperature variation; in Milan, the average temperature is 2.5 °C (36.5 °F) in January and 24 °C (75 °F) in July. The plains are often subject to fog during the coldest months.

In the Alpine foothills with an oceanic climate (Köppen Cfb), numerous lakes have a mitigating influence, allowing typically Mediterranean crops (such as olive and citrus fruit) to grow. In the hills and mountains, the climate is humid continental (Köppen Dfb). In the valleys, it is relatively mild, while it can be severely cold with copious snowfalls above 1,500 m (4,900 ft).

Precipitation is more intense in the Prealpine zone, with up to 1,500 to 2,000 mm (59.1 to 78.7 in) annually, but it is also abundant in the plains and alpine zones, with an average of 600 to 850 mm (23.6 to 33.5 in) annually. The average annual rainfall is 827 mm (32.6 in). Lake Garda, thanks to its size and position, mitigates the climate of its coasts, creating a "Mediterranean" microclimate that makes the cultivation of olive trees and the production of olive oil possible; the so-called "Lombard oil" is also produced in other Lombard lake areas.

=== Geology ===
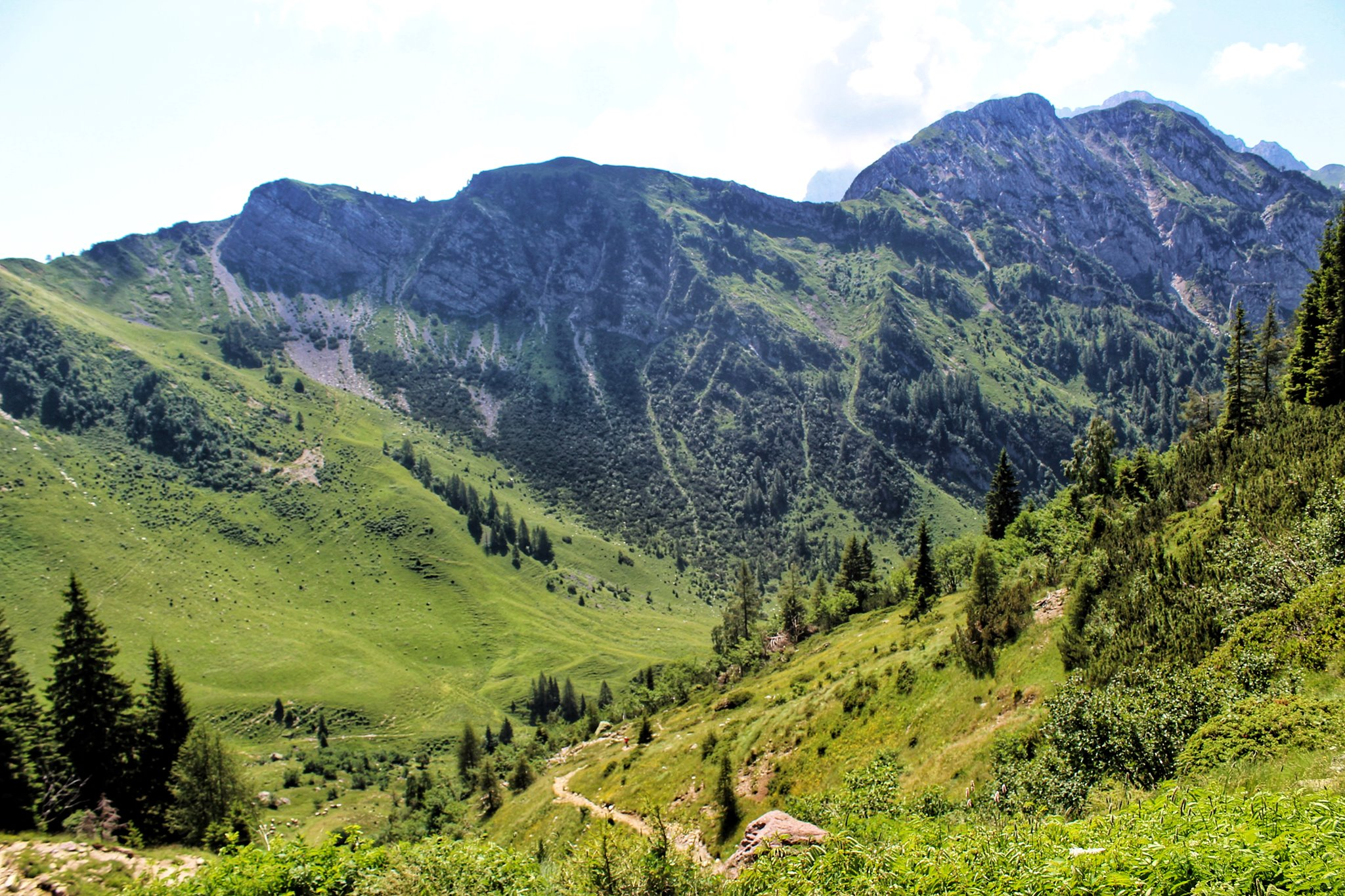
Val Brembana

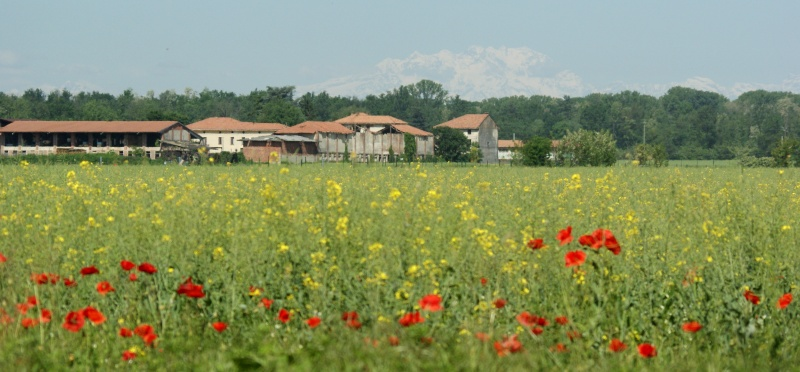
Po Valley in Origgio, in the Alto Milanese. In the background Mount Rosa

The geological structure of Lombardy derives from the orogeny of the Alps, resulting from the collision between the African and Eurasian plates, which generated the Alpine chain from the Upper Cretaceous to the Miocene.

The Po Valley, on the other hand, is of more recent origin, formed by the deposit of detrital material on the continental shelf, coming from the erosion caused by surface waters that accompanied the lifting of the Alpine chain, which rose to the west and north of the plain, and of the Apennine chain to the south, filling the marine gulf that existed in the Pliocene, created by the uplift of the two mountain chains.

=== Pollution ===
Lombardy is one of the most air-polluted areas of Europe. Because of high levels of industrialisation and the lack of wind due to the region being enclosed between mountain ranges, air pollution remains a severe problem in Lombardy and northern Italy.

In March 2019, the European Space Agency (ESA) published images taken from its satellites, showing a large stain composed of nitrogen dioxide and fine particles above the Po Valley area. Lombardy is the geographic and economic centre of this area, with more than 10 million residents and the highest GRP per inhabitant in the country. Most of its major cities are located in the Po River basin, which crosses the region. The stain analysed by ESA is the main reason Po Valley air pollution levels are so high. Milan also has high levels of ozone and nitrogen oxides, which are mainly produced by diesel and petrol engines in cars.

According to the Chicago Energy Policy Institute, which has recently developed the Air Quality Life Index (AQLI), Po Valley air pollution reduces life expectancy by approximately six months. Air pollution in the Po Valley is linked to livestock and factories. The use of NPK fertilizers, composed of nitrogen, phosphorus, and potassium, along with manure emissions from intensive breeding and high levels of nitrogen dioxide released by diesel and petrol engines are all contributing factors to pollution in Northern Italy. Lombardy also produces vast amounts of animal waste, a significant contributor to pollution. Lombardy produces more than 40% of Italy's milk, and over half of the Italian pig production is located in the Po Valley.

According to research published in The Lancet Planetary Health, in January 2021, Brescia and Bergamo had the highest death rate from fine particulate matter (PM_{2.5}) in Europe.

The data show that many cities in Lombardy and the Po Valley suffer from the most serious impact of poor air quality in Europe, primarily the metropolitan area of Milan, which ranks 13th in terms of fine particulate impact, with an annual premature death rate of 3,967, accounting for approximately 9% of the total.

== Demographics ==
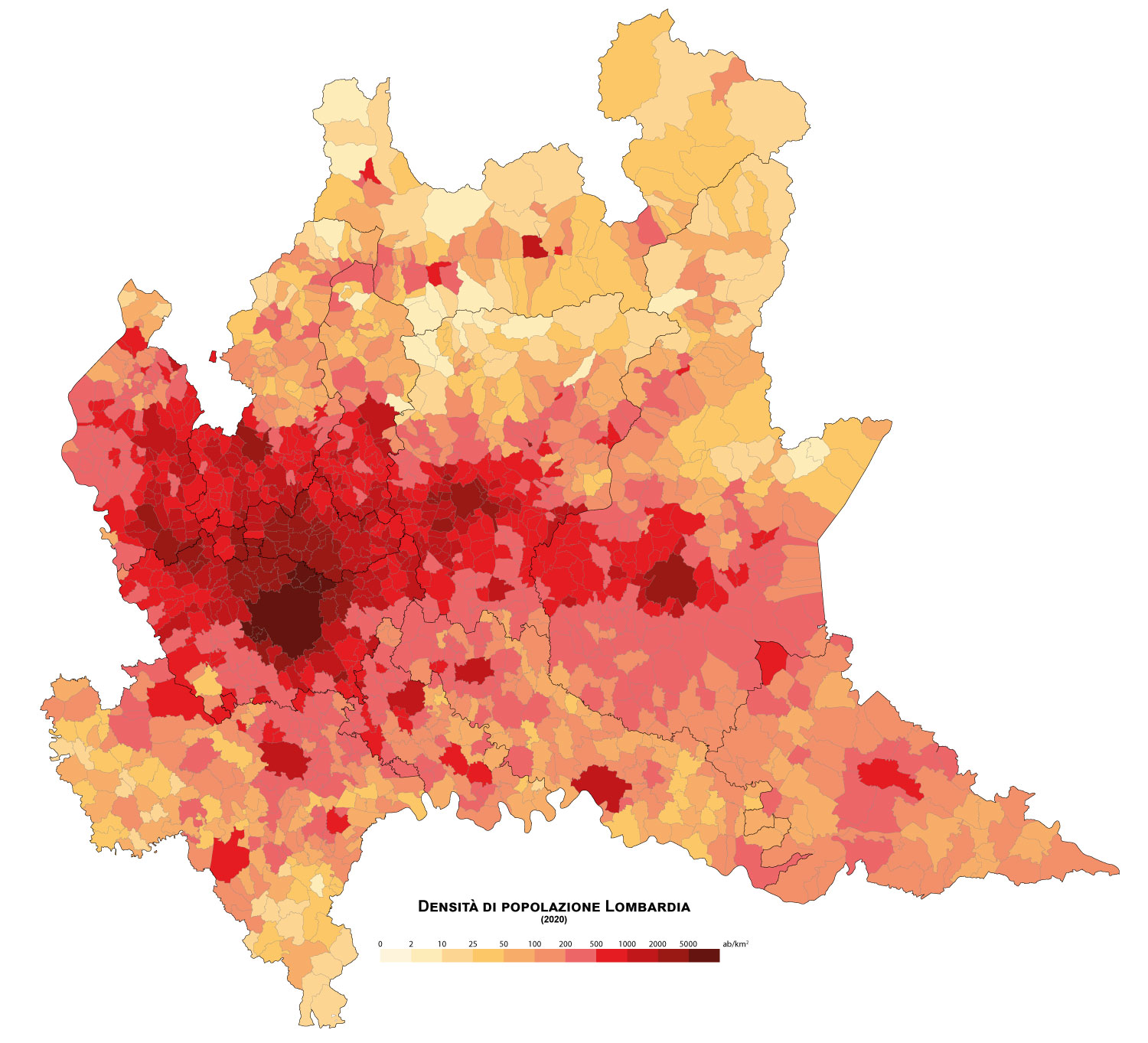
Population density in Lombardy (2020)

Historical population
| Year | Pop. | ±% |
|---|---|---|
| 1861 | 3,160,481 | — |
| 1871 | 3,529,732 | +11.7% |
| 1881 | 3,729,927 | +5.7% |
| 1901 | 4,313,893 | +15.7% |
| 1911 | 4,889,178 | +13.3% |
| 1921 | 5,186,288 | +6.1% |
| 1931 | 5,595,915 | +7.9% |
| 1936 | 5,836,342 | +4.3% |
| 1951 | 6,566,154 | +12.5% |
| 1961 | 7,406,152 | +12.8% |
| 1971 | 8,543,387 | +15.4% |
| 1981 | 8,891,652 | +4.1% |
| 1991 | 8,856,074 | −0.4% |
| 2001 | 9,032,554 | +2.0% |
| 2011 | 9,704,151 | +7.4% |
| 2021 | 9,943,004 | +2.5% |
Source: ISTAT

As of 2026, the population is 10,065,694, of which 49.4% are male, and 50.6% are female. Minors make up 14.9% of the population, and seniors make up 24.2%.

One-sixth of the Italian population, about 10 million people, live in Lombardy (17.1% of the national population; 2.2% of the European Union population). Lombardy is the second most populous region in the European Union.

The population is highly concentrated in the Milan metropolitan area (2,029 inh./km^{2}) and the Alpine foothills that compose the southern section of the provinces Varese, Como, Lecco, Monza and Brianza and Bergamo, (1,200 inh./km^{2}). A lower average population density (250 inh./km^{2}) is found in the Po Valley and the lower Brescia valleys; much lower densities (fewer than 60 inh./km^{2}) inhabit the northern mountain areas and the southern Oltrepò Pavese subregion.

The growth of the regional population was particularly sustained during the 1950s–1960s, due to a prolonged economic boom, high birth rates and strong migration inflows—especially from southern Italy. Since the 1980s, Lombardy has become the destination of a large number of international migrants, to the point where they now make up 14.9% of the population.

=== Religion ===
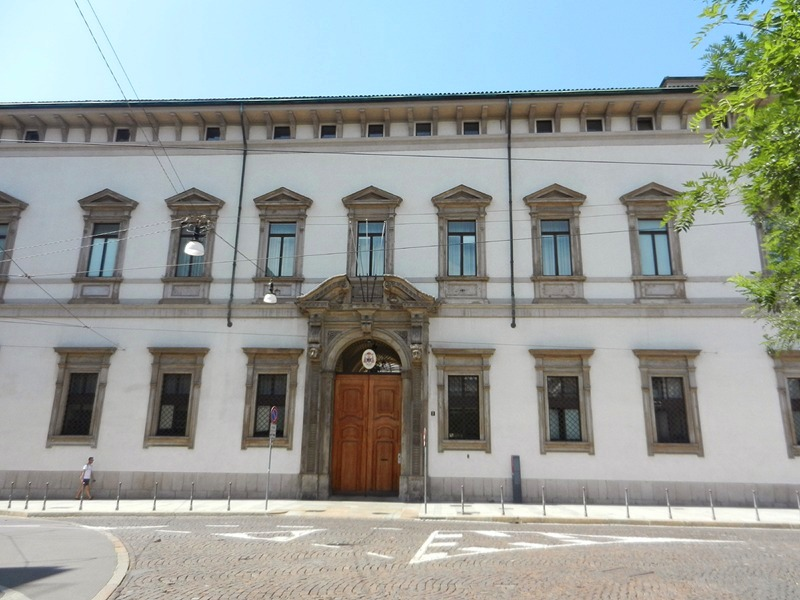
Palazzo Arcivescovile in Milan, the official residence of the Archbishop of Milan

The primary religion is Roman Catholicism. Over the centuries, the Catholic dioceses of Lombardy have given birth to ten popes: Pope John XIV, Pope Alexander II, Pope Urban III, Pope Celestine IV, Pope Pius IV, Pope Gregory XIV, Pope Innocent XI, Pope Pius XI, Pope John XXIII and Pope Paul VI.

The structure of the Lombard Catholic dioceses is historical. Of the ten dioceses, eight date back to the Roman Empire, only Crema and Vigevano were created in the 16th century to reflect political needs, (Note: Crema belonged to the part of the territory of Cremona conquered for more than a century by the Republic of Venice, whereas Vigevano reunified an area formerly from Novara which over the centuries had been fragmented due to the powerful influence of nearby Pavia.) and it does not appear that any diocesan seat was ever suppressed. The diocese of Lugano was created in the 19th century to separate the Swiss parishes which since ancient times had been dependent on the dioceses of Como and Milan.

In Lombardy there are two main Catholic liturgical rites: the Ambrosian Rite (used in the Milanese archdiocese, but also used in the parishes of Val Taleggio in the province of Bergamo) and the Roman Rite. The Milanese diocese, comprising approximately half of the faithful of the region, is the metropolitan see, while the others are its suffragans.

Significant religious minorities in Lombardy include Evangelicals, Orthodox Christians, as well as Jews, Buddhists, Sikhs and Muslims.

=== Immigration ===
As of 2025, immigrants make up 14.9% of the population, the 3rd-largest proportion of all Italian regions. The 5 largest foreign countries of birth are Romania, Albania, Egypt, Morocco, and Ukraine.

Foreign population by country of birth (2025)
| Country of birth | Population |
|---|---|
| Romania | 132,919 |
| Albania | 117,282 |
| Egypt | 115,261 |
| Morocco | 110,870 |
| Ukraine | 73,614 |
| India | 63,502 |
| Peru | 60,754 |
| China | 57,560 |
| Pakistan | 51,895 |
| Philippines | 50,009 |
| Senegal | 39,955 |
| Moldova | 38,711 |
| Brazil | 37,444 |
| Ecuador | 35,070 |
| Bangladesh | 31,717 |

== Government and politics ==
=== Government ===
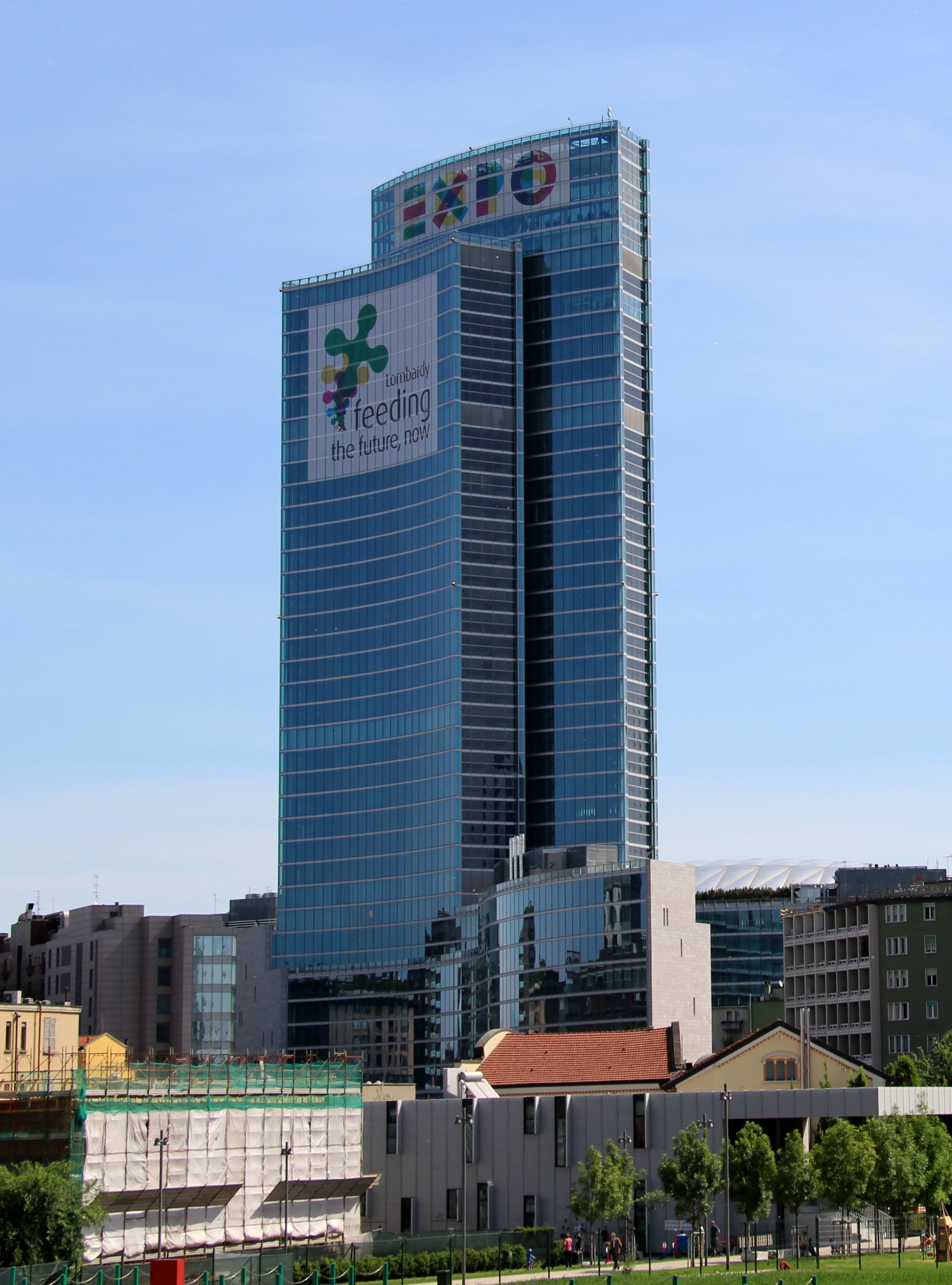
Palazzo Lombardia in Milan, headquarters of the regional government of Lombardy

Lombardy has a system of representative democracy in which the President of the Region (Presidente della Regione) is the head of government and of a pluriform multi-party system. Executive power is vested in the regional government (Giunta Regionale) and legislative power is vested in the Regional Council (Consiglio Regionale).

Like the other regions of Italy with ordinary statutes, the region has been provided for since 1948 by articles 114 and 115 of the Constitution of Italy, but only with law no. 281 of 16 May 1970 having as its object "Financial measures for the implementation of the Regions with ordinary statute", did it implement its functions. The law, which aimed to implement the process of administrative decentralization envisaged by article 5 and article 118 of the Constitution, started the process.

The Council is elected for a five-year term, but, if the President suffers a vote of no confidence, resigns or dies, under the simul stabunt, simul cadent clause introduced in 1999 (literally they will stand together or they will fall together), also the Council is dissolved and a snap election is called. The Regional Cabinet (Giunta Regionale) is presided by the President of the Region (Presidente della Regione), who is elected for a five-year term, and is currently composed by 17 members: the President and 16 regional Assessors, including a Vice President (Vice Presidente), while 4 under-secretaries (Sottosegretari) help the President but have no voting rights in the cabinet meetings.

=== Politics ===
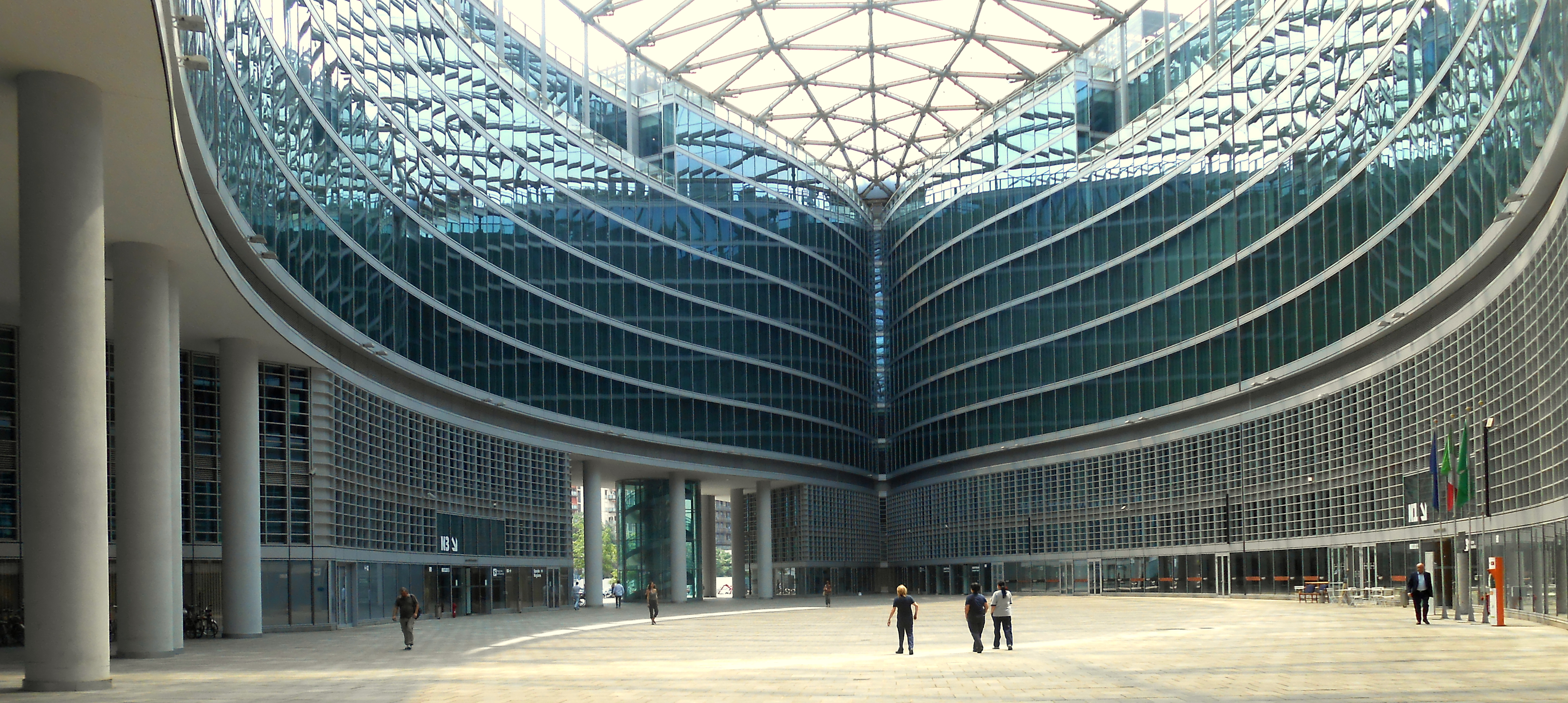
Internal view of Palazzo Lombardia

From 1945 to the early 1990s, the moderate Christian Democrats maintained a large majority of the popular support and control of the most important cities and provinces from the end of the Second World War. The opposition Italian Communist Party was a considerable presence only in southern Lombardy and in the working-class districts of Milan; their base, however, was increasingly eroded by the rival centrist Italian Socialist Party until the Mani Pulite corruption scandal, which spread from Milan to the whole of Italy, almost completely erased the old political class.

This, together with general disaffection for the central government, led to the sudden growth of the secessionist Northern League. Since 2002, Lombardy has remained strongly conservative in six general elections. The regional capital Milan elected progressive Giuliano Pisapia at the 2011 municipal elections and the 2013 regional elections saw a narrow victory for the centre-right coalition.

On 22 October 2017, a non-binding autonomy referendum took place in Lombardy. The turnout was 38.3%, of which 95.3% voted in favour.

=== Administrative divisions ===
Lombardy is divided into 1,501 municipalities (the region with the largest number of municipalities in the entire national territory), distributed in twelve administrative subdivisions (eleven provinces plus the Metropolitan City of Milan). The largest province is that of Brescia, the smallest that of Monza and Brianza. The exclave of Campione d'Italia also belongs to the region, a municipality entirely surrounded by Swiss territory and part of the province of Como.

The provinces/metropolitan cities of Lombardy

| Province Metropolitan city | Population (2026) | Area (km2) | Density (inh./km^{2}) | Municipalities |
|---|---|---|---|---|
| Province of Bergamo | 1,119,233 | 2,745.94 | 407.6 | 243 |
| Province of Brescia | 1,271,759 | 4,785.62 | 265.7 | 205 |
| Province of Como | 598,562 | 1,279.04 | 468.0 | 147 |
| Province of Cremona | 355,134 | 1,770.46 | 200.6 | 113 |
| Province of Lecco | 334,211 | 814.58 | 410.3 | 84 |
| Province of Lodi | 231,481 | 782.99 | 295.6 | 60 |
| Province of Mantua | 408,715 | 2,341.44 | 174.6 | 64 |
| Metropolitan City of Milan | 3,253,111 | 1,575.65 | 2,064.6 | 133 |
| Province of Monza and Brianza | 883,396 | 405.41 | 2,179.0 | 55 |
| Province of Pavia | 546,023 | 2,968.64 | 183.9 | 184 |
| Province of Sondrio | 179,268 | 3,195.76 | 56.1 | 77 |
| Province of Varese | 884,801 | 1,198.11 | 738.5 | 136 |

Largest cities or towns in Lombardy ISTAT - January 2026
| Rank | | Province | Pop. | Rank | | Province | Pop. |
|---|---|---|---|---|---|---|---|
| 1 | Milan | Milan | 1,362,863 | 11 | Cremona | Cremona | 71,093 |
| 2 | Brescia | Brescia | 201,342 | 12 | Vigevano | Pavia | 63,480 |
| 3 | Monza | Monza | 123,672 | 13 | Legnano | Milan | 60,980 |
| 4 | Bergamo | Bergamo | 120,629 | 14 | Gallarate | Varese | 53,023 |
| 5 | Busto Arsizio | Varese | 84,595 | 15 | Rho | Milan | 51,000 |
| 6 | Como | Como | 83,035 | 16 | Mantua | Mantua | 50,215 |
| 7 | Varese | Varese | 79,100 | 17 | Paderno Dugnano | Milan | 47,938 |
| 8 | Sesto San Giovanni | Milan | 78,850 | 18 | Lecco | Lecco | 47,326 |
| 9 | Cinisello Balsamo | Milan | 75,154 | 19 | Cologno Monzese | Milan | 47,179 |
| 10 | Pavia | Pavia | 71,811 | 20 | Lissone | Monza | 46,792 |

=== Symbols ===
The flag of Lombardy

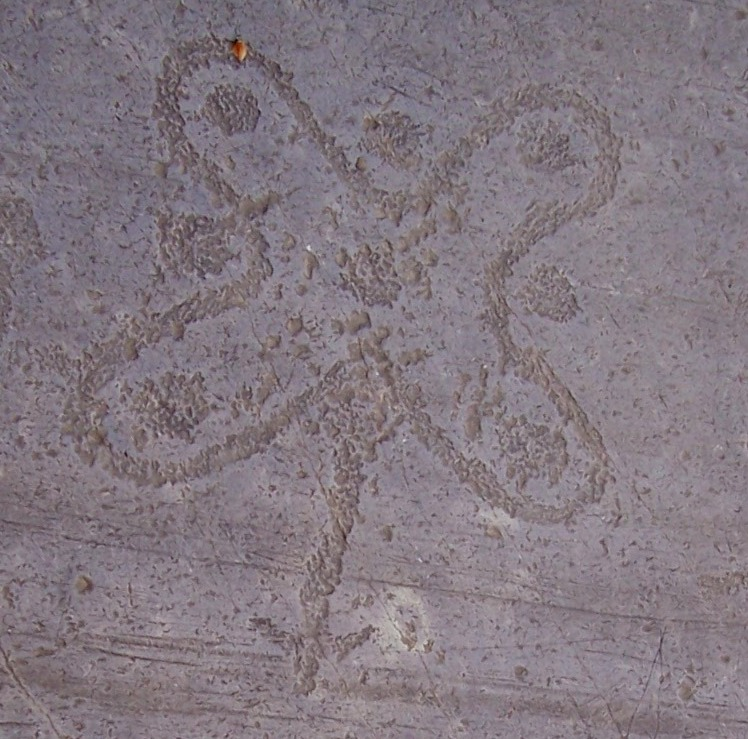
One of the Camunian roses depicted in the Rock Drawings in Valcamonica, in the province of Brescia

The symbols of Lombardy are, pursuant to the region's statute of autonomy, the flag, the coat of arms, the banner and the celebration of 29 May.

The official coat of arms of Lombardy consists of a Camunian rose, an ancient solar symbol common to some proto-Celtic peoples, present in 94 of the approximately 140,000 Rock Drawings in Valcamonica, in the province of Brescia. These engravings were made from the Mesolithic (approximately 8th-6th millennium BC) to the Iron Age (1st millennium BC) by various ancient peoples, including the Camunni. The engravings made by the latter, including the rose of the same name, were made during the Iron Age.

The Camunian rose on the region's coat of arms is made of argent, symbolizing light. In the background, the green colour represents the Po Valley. Officially adopted together with the banner with regional law n. 85 of 12 June 1975, the coat of arms was introduced on the proposal of the then councilor for culture Alessandro Fontana and was designed in the same year by Pino Tovaglia, Bob Noorda, Roberto Sambonet and Bruno Munari.

The banner consists of a reproduction of the Carroccio, a large four-wheeled chariot bearing the city insignia around which the militias of the Medieval communes of northern Italy gathered and fought, whose autonomy it represented, and of the coat of arms of the region. The dimensions of the Lombardy banner are 3 m × 2 m (9.8 ft × 6.6 ft) and the ribbons and tie are in the national colours of Italy.

Since 29 January 2019 the Lombardy region has adopted the coat of arms with the Camunian rose as its official flag, thus attesting to the established practice in public offices and events.

The regional festival of Lombardy, which was established with regional law n. 15 of 26 November 2013, is celebrated on 29 May in memory of the victory of the Lombard League over the imperial troops of Frederick Barbarossa in the battle of Legnano, an armed clash which took place on 29 May 1176 in the surroundings of the city of the same name which ended to the hegemonic plan of the German emperor over the medieval municipalities of northern Italy. After the decisive defeat of Legnano, the emperor accepted a six-year armistice (the so-called "Venice truce"), until the Peace of Constance, following which the medieval municipalities of northern Italy agreed to remain faithful to the Empire in exchange for full local jurisdiction over their territories.

== Culture ==
=== Cuisine ===
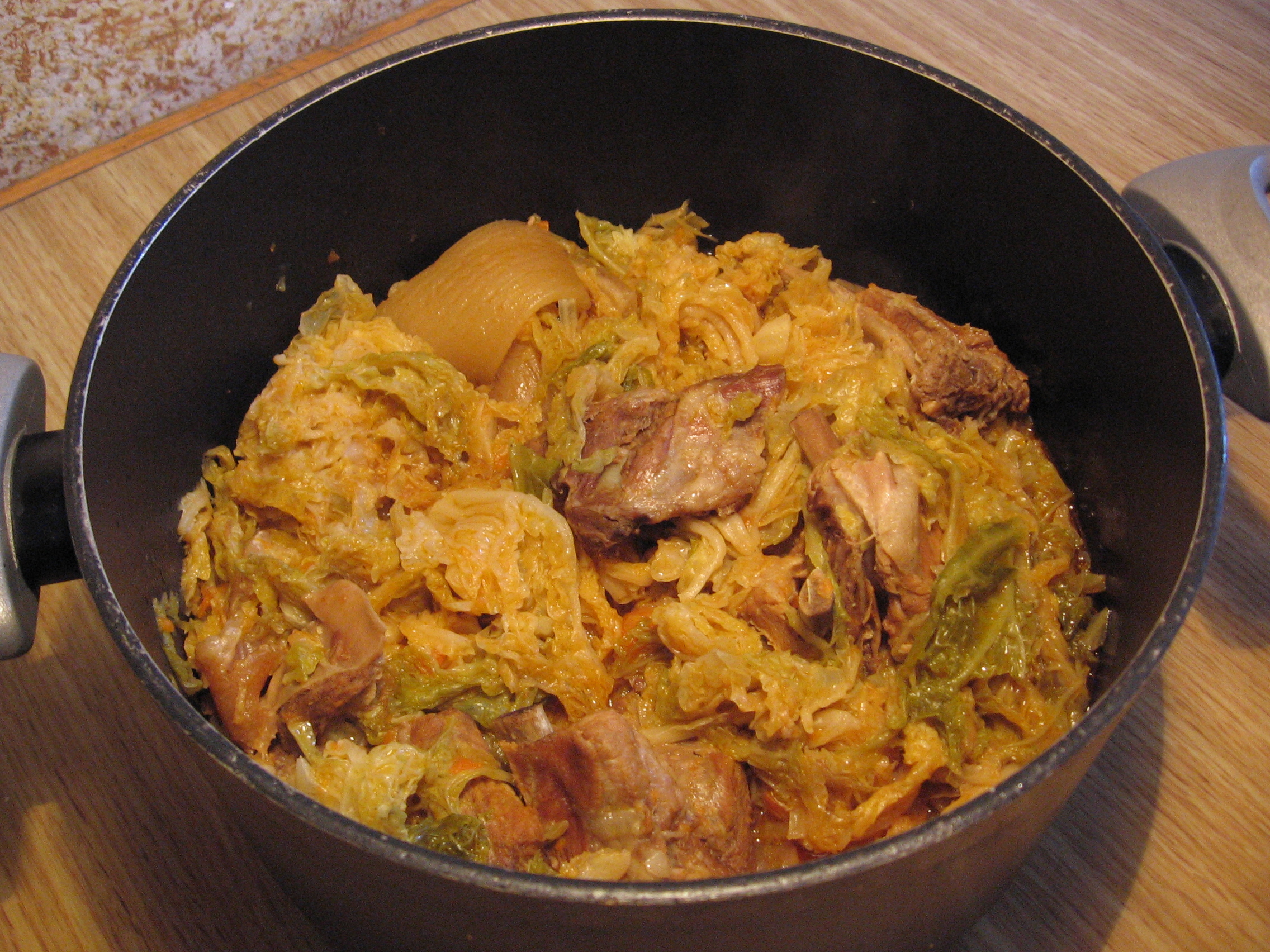
A crockpot of cassœula. It is a typical dish of the popular tradition, a main dish of many Lombard sagre.

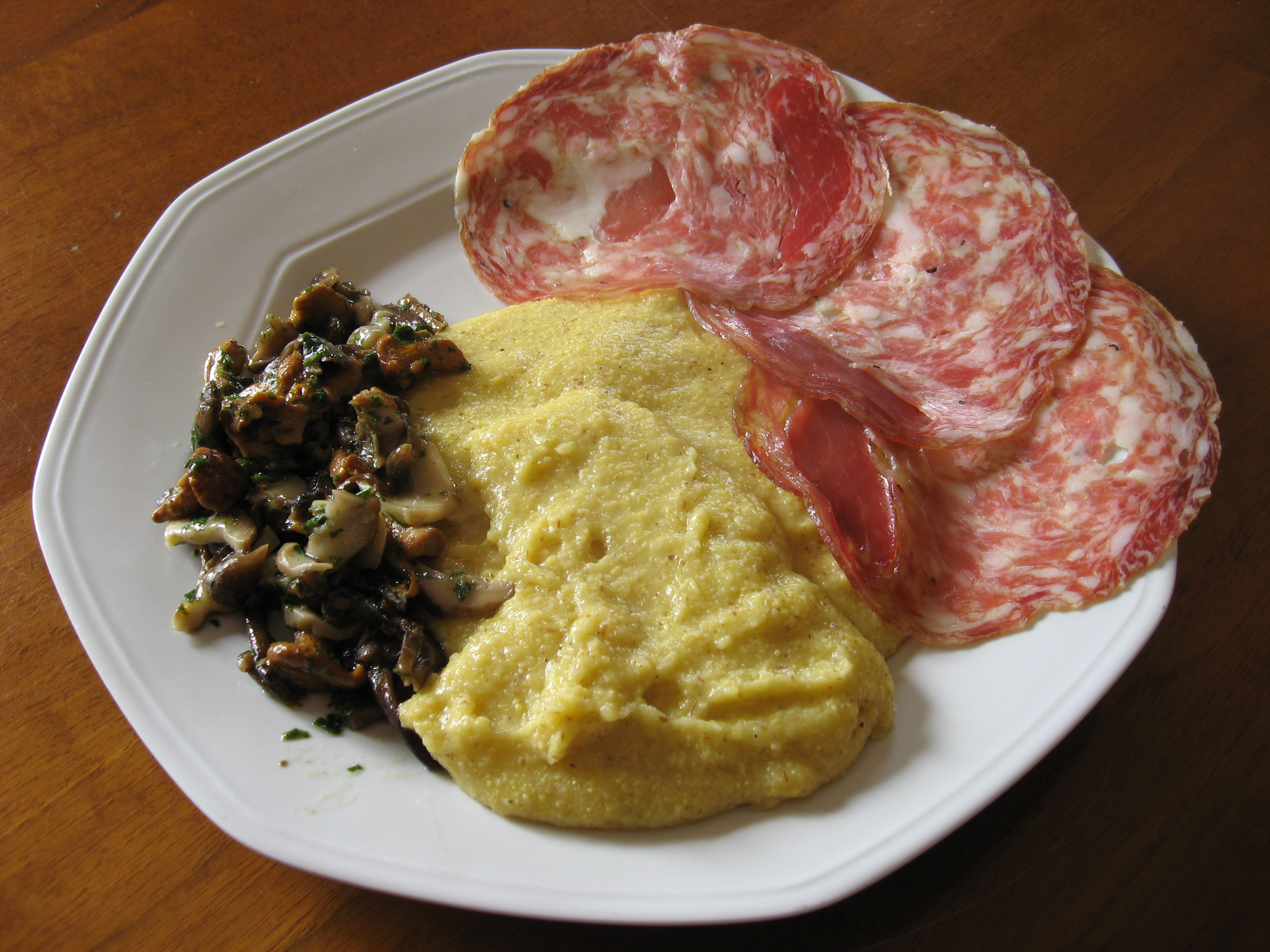
Polenta porridge, one of the typical dishes of Lombardy, served with salami and mushrooms

Lombard cuisine is the style of cooking in the Northern Italian region of Lombardy. The historical events of its provinces and the diversity of its territories resulted in a varied culinary tradition. First courses in Lombard cuisine range from risottos to soups and stuffed pasta (in broth or not), and a large choice of second-course meat or fish dishes, due to the many lakes and rivers of Lombardy.

The cuisine of the various Lombardy provinces can be united by the following traits: prevalence of rice and stuffed pasta over dry pasta, both butter and olive oil for cooking, dishes cooked for a long time, as well as the widespread use of pork, milk and dairy products, and egg-based preparations; to which is added the consumption of polenta, common to the whole Northern Italy.

Rice is popular in Lombardy; the region is the largest in Europe for rice production and in particular the province of Pavia, where over 84,000 ha (210,000 acres) are cultivated. Rice is often used in soups and risotti, such as "risotto alla milanese", with saffron. In Monza, a popular recipe adds pieces of sausages to the risotto, while in Pavia they eat Carthusian risotto, according to the legend created by the monks of the Certosa, which is based on crayfish, carrots and onions. They also eat risotto with eye beans, a version with sausage and bonarda, and risotto with common hops (ürtis in Pavese dialect). Polenta is common throughout the region.

Regional cheeses include Robiola, Crescenza, Taleggio, Gorgonzola and Grana Padano. Butter and cream are used. Single-pot dishes, which take little work to prepare, are popular. Common types of pasta include Casoncelli in Brescia and Bergamo and Pizzoccheri in Valtellina. In Mantua, festivals feature tortelli di zucca (ravioli with pumpkin filling) accompanied by melted butter and followed by turkey stuffed with chicken or other stewed meats. Among typical regional desserts is Nocciolini di Canzo—dry biscuits. Common in the whole Insubria area are bruscitti, originating from Altomilanese, which consist of a braised meat dish cut very thin and cooked in wine and fennel seeds, historically obtained by stripping leftover meat.

==== Typical dishes and products ====
- Amaretti di Saronno
- Bitto
- Bresaola
- Bruscitti
- Casoncelli
- Cassoeula
- Colomba di Pasqua
- Cotoletta (cutlet) alla milanese
- Gorgonzola cheese
- Grana Padano cheese
- Lo Spiedo Bresciano – spit roast of different cuts of meat with butter and sage
- Mascarpone
- Mostarda
- Ossobuco
- Panettone
- Pavese agnolotti
- Pizzoccheri (tagliatelle of buckwheat and wheat, laced with butter, green vegetables, potatoes, sage and garlic, topped with Casera cheese)
- Polenta (eaten also in its taragna variant in the Northern part of the region)
- Risotto alla milanese
- Rosa Camuna cheese
- Salame d'oca di Mortara (goose salami)
- Salamella (sausage, always served grilled)
- Sbrisolona cake
- Stracchino cheese
- Taleggio cheese
- Torrone
- Tortelli di zucca (pumpkin-filled pasta)
- Zuppa pavese
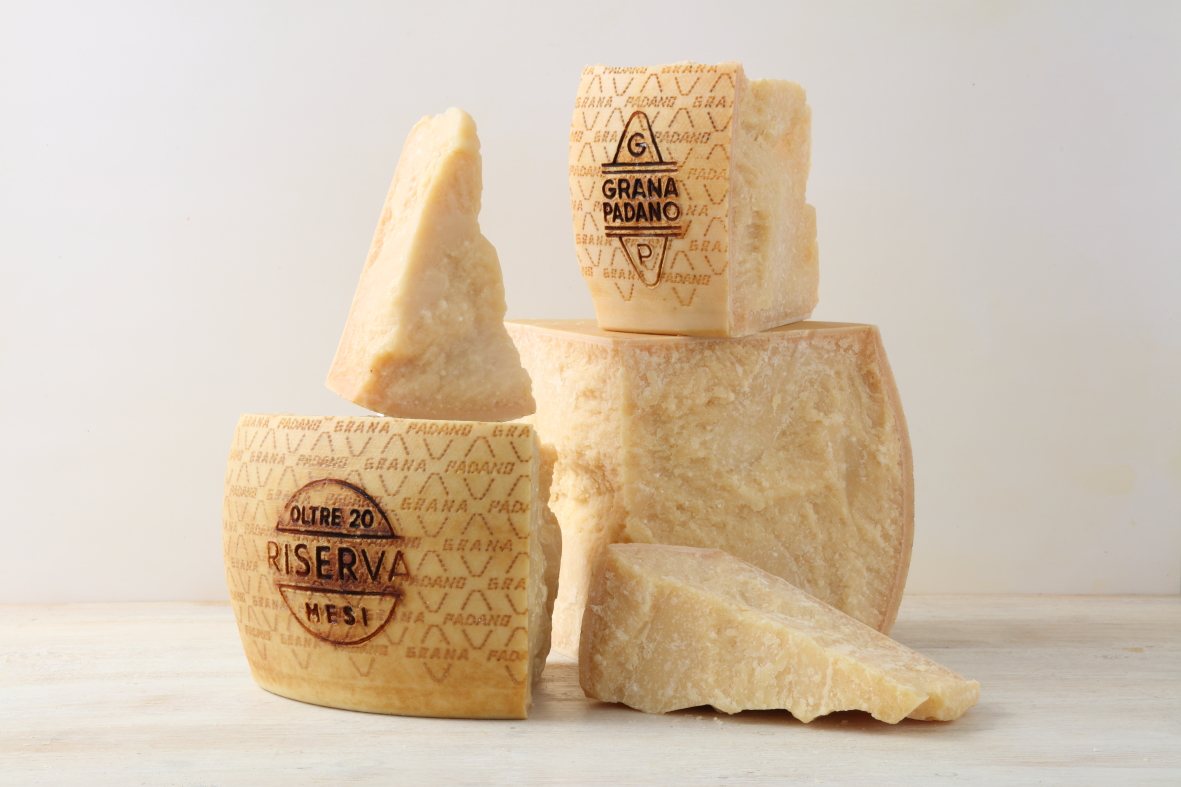
Grana Padano DPO

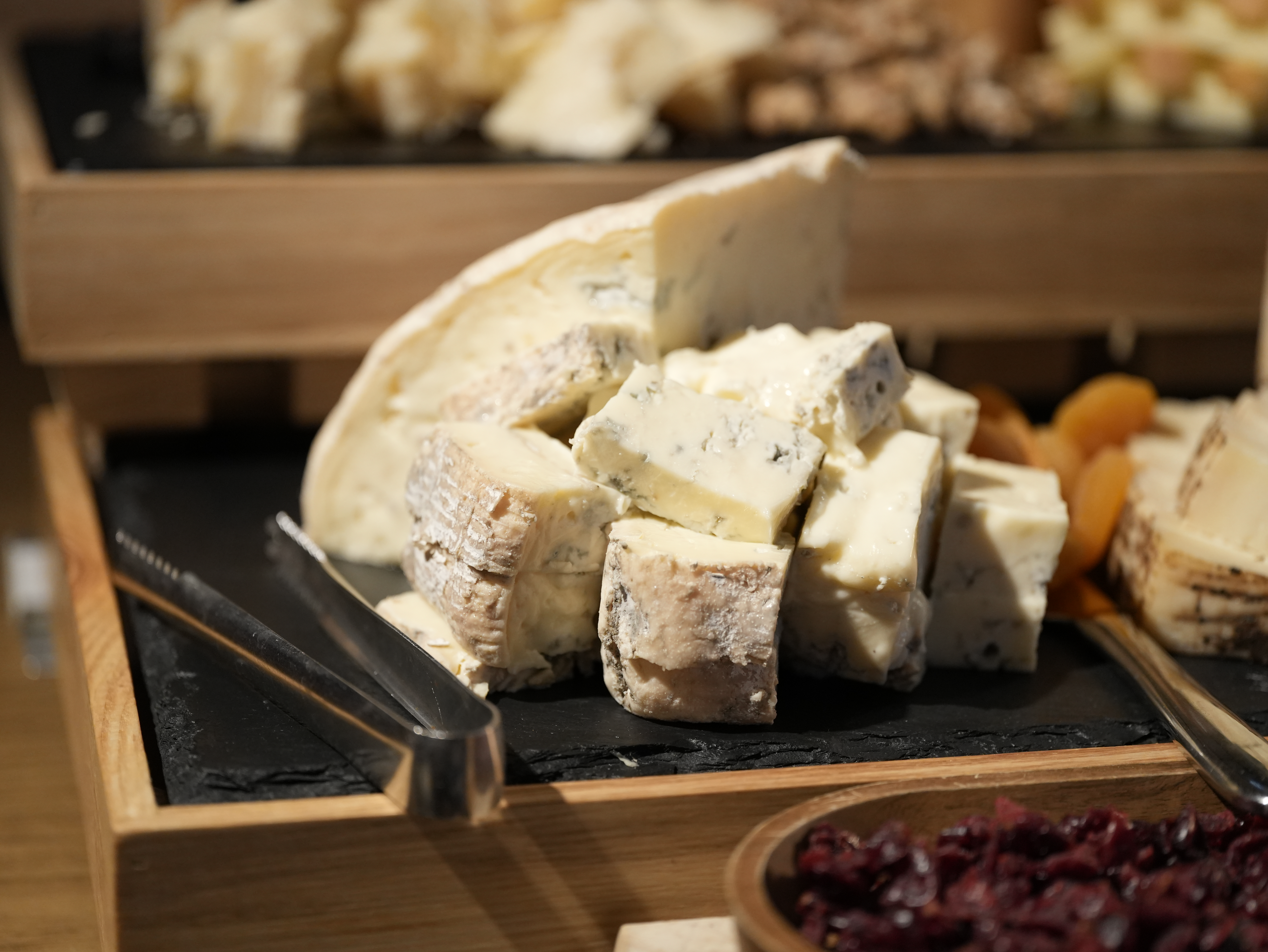
Gorgonzola cheese takes its name from the homonymous town near Milan.

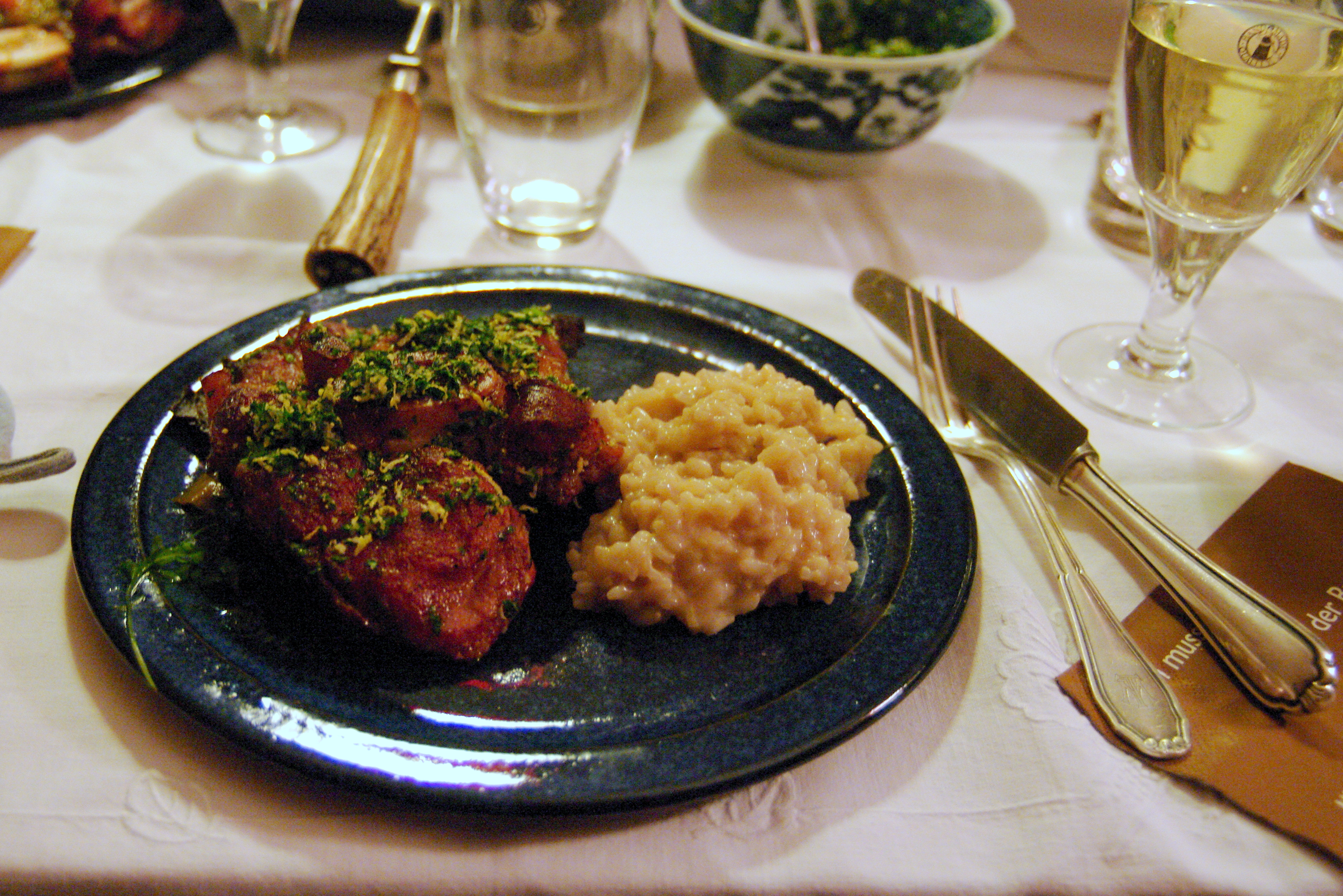
Ossobuco with risotto alla milanese

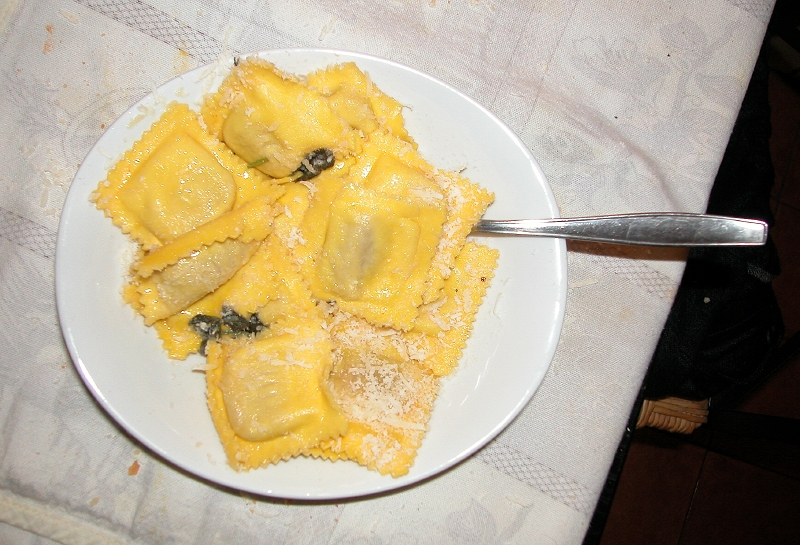
Tortelli di zucca (pumpkin-filled pasta) with butter and sage

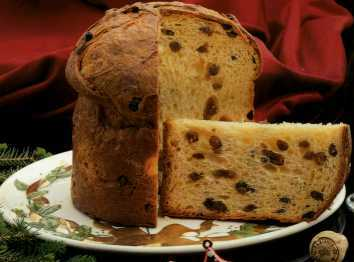
Panettone cut over a Christmas plate

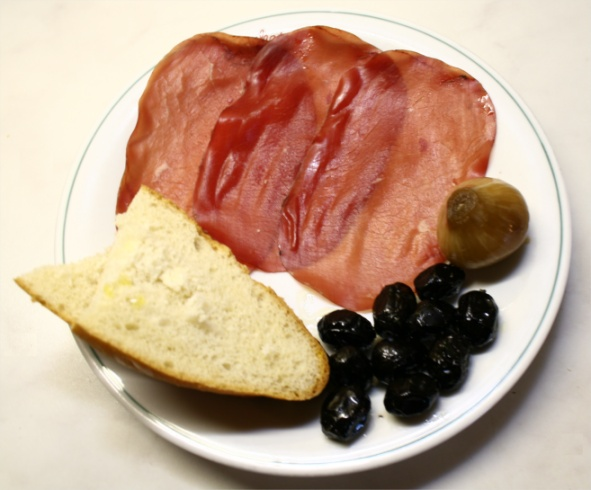
Bresaola della Valtellina served with bread, olives and onions

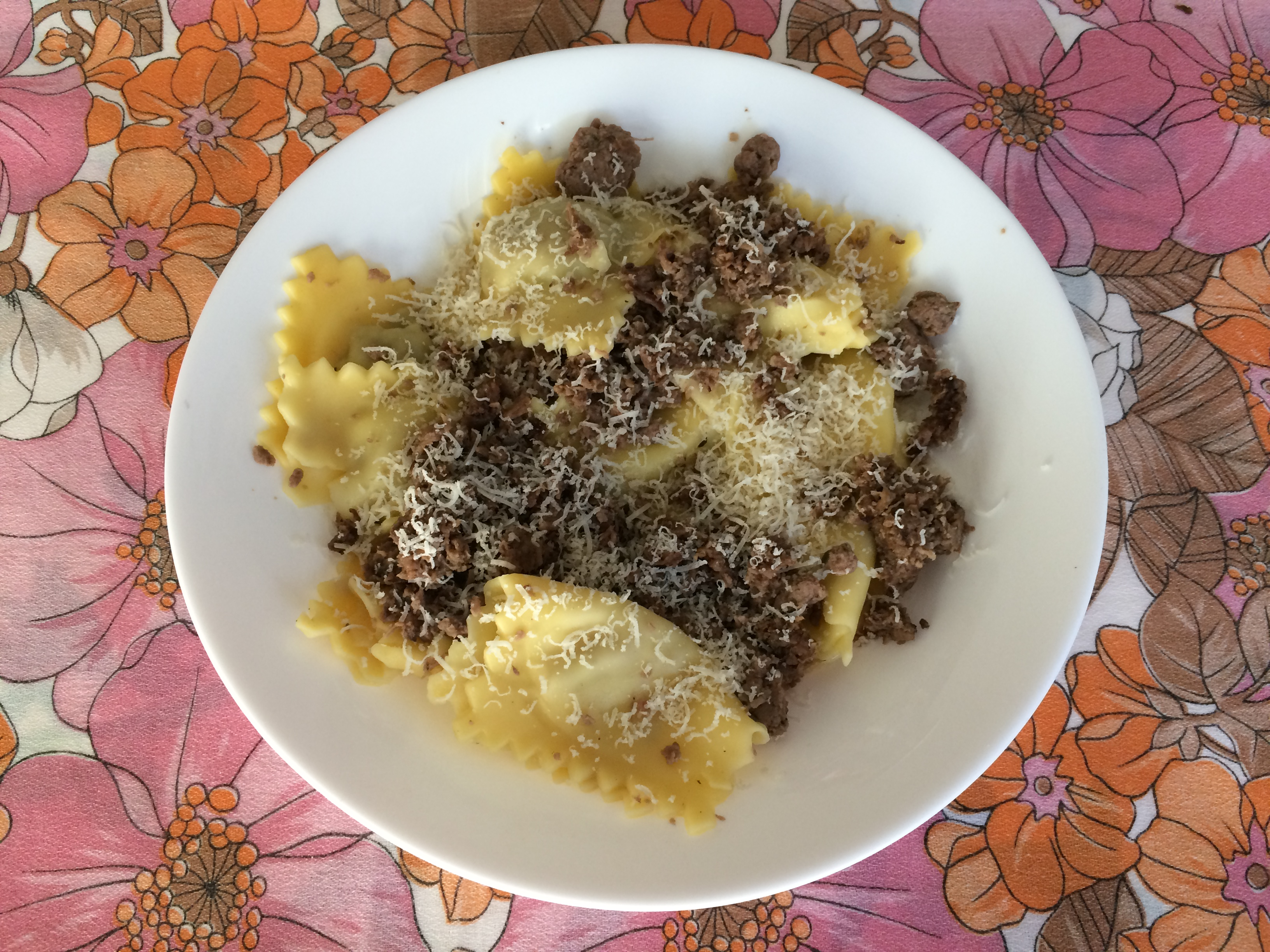
A dish of dry Pavese agnolotti, a type of stuffed pasta, with a Pavese stew-based sauce

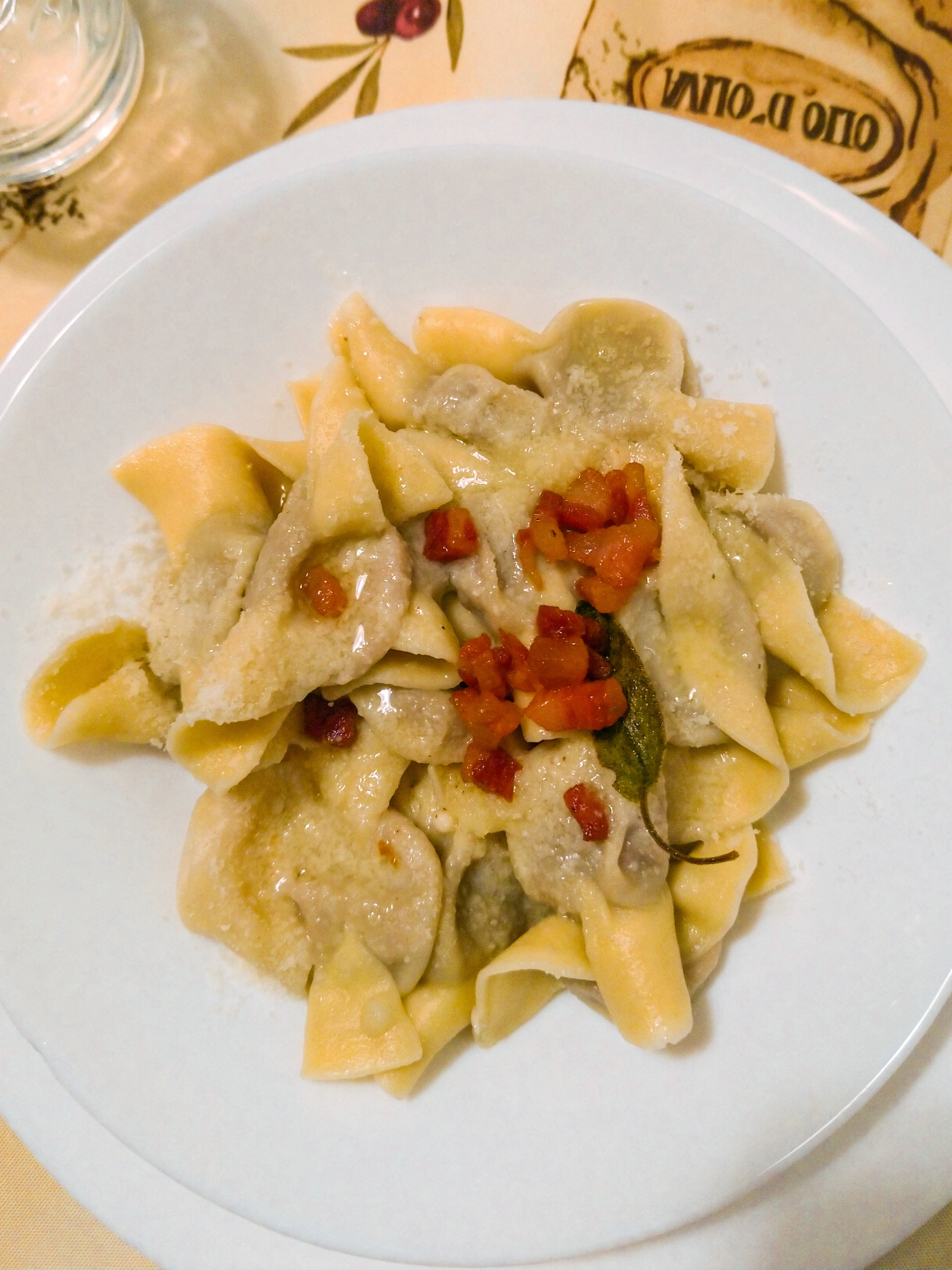
Casoncelli

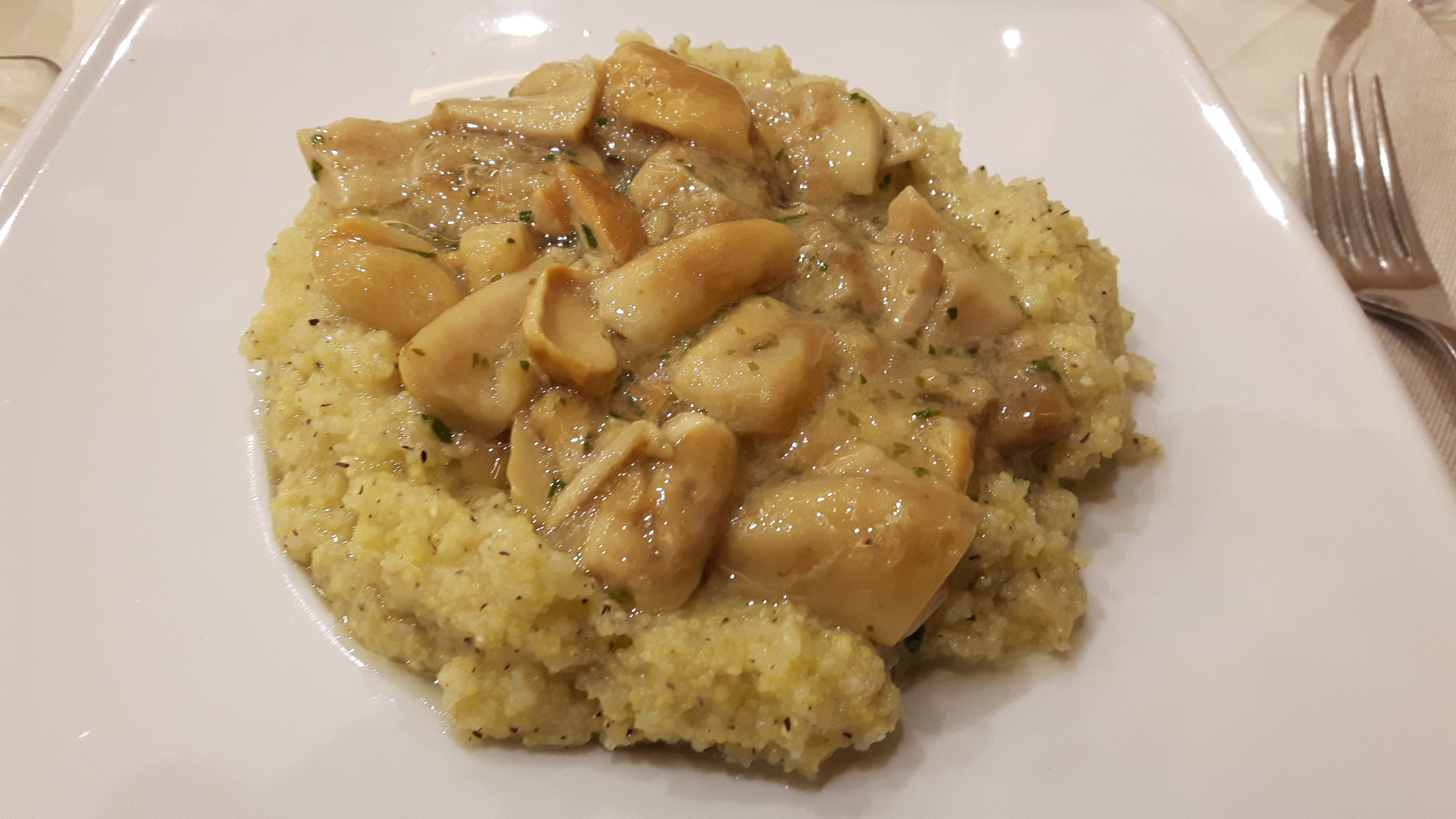
Polenta with mushrooms

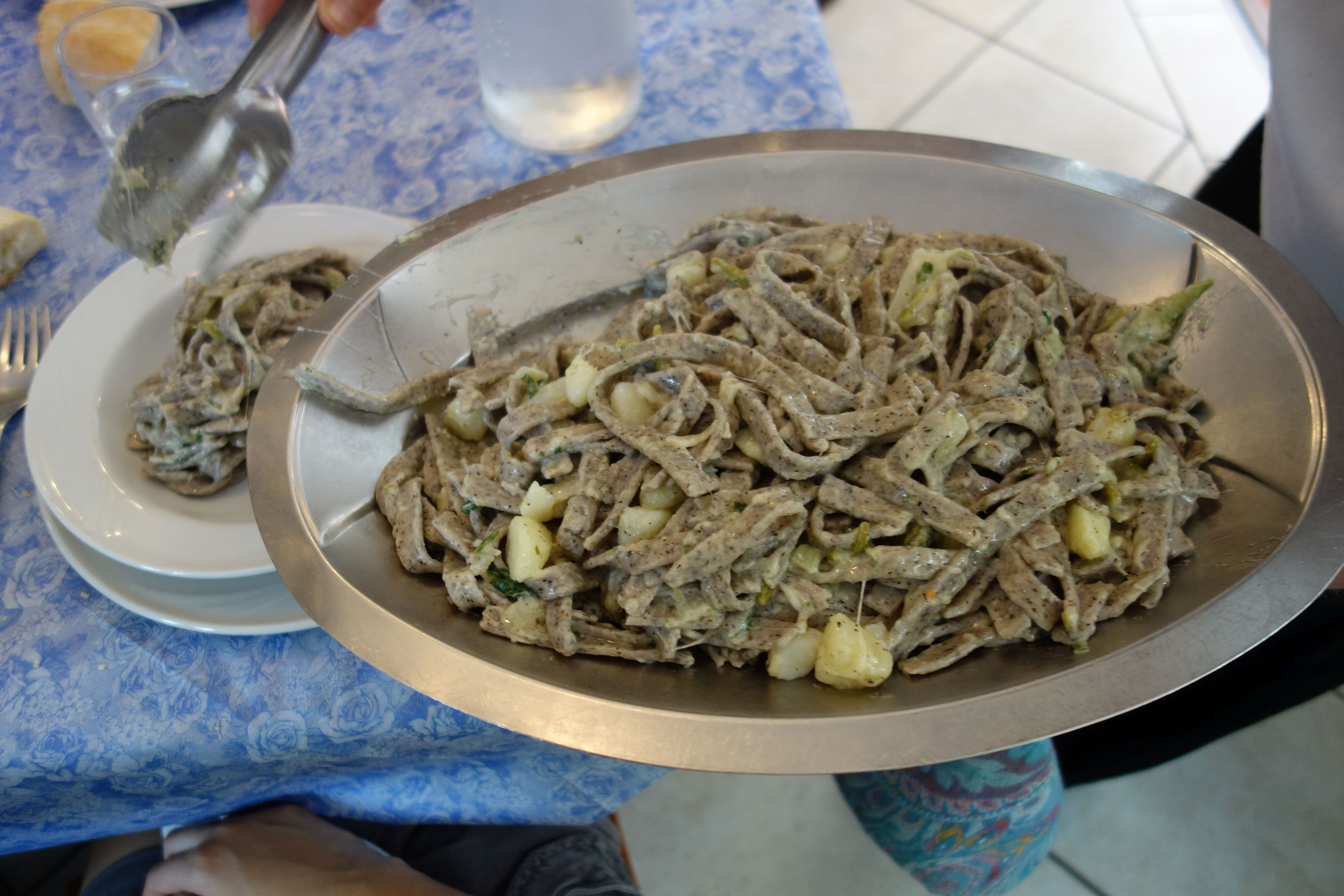
Pizzoccheri

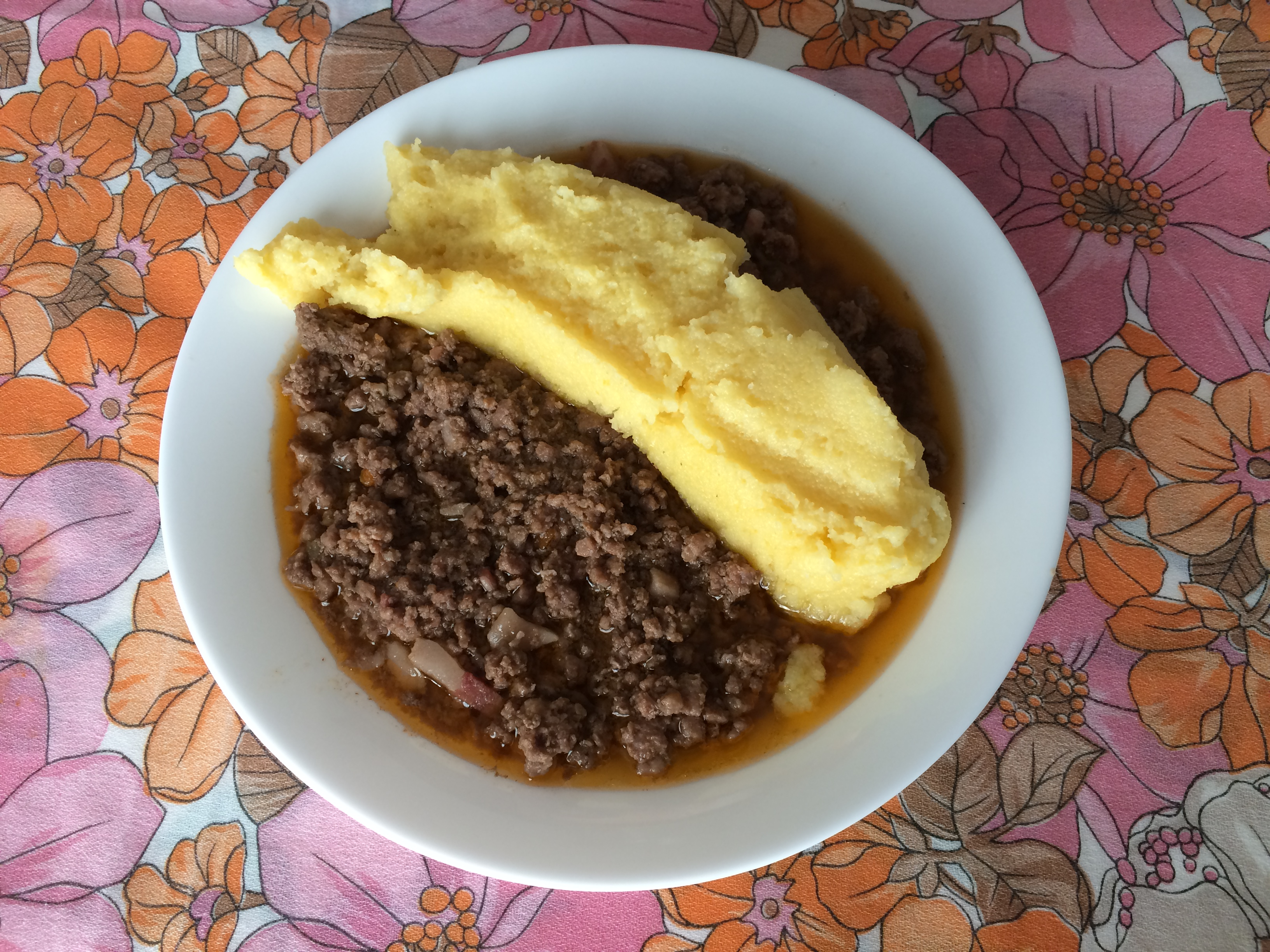
Bruscitti served with polenta porridge

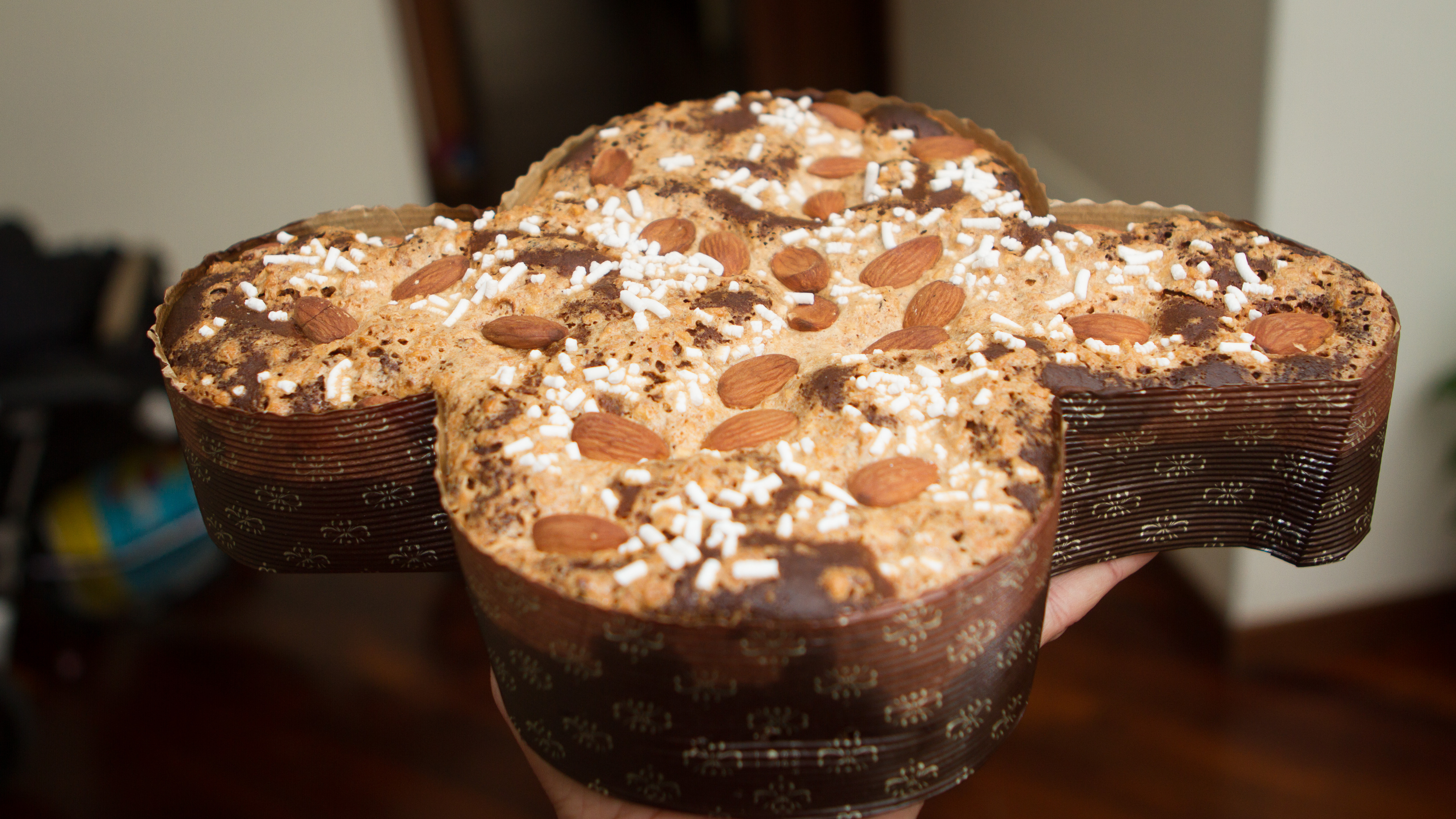
Italian Easter bread, the Colomba di Pasqua. It is the Easter counterpart of the two well-known Italian Christmas desserts, panettone and pandoro.

==== Wines ====
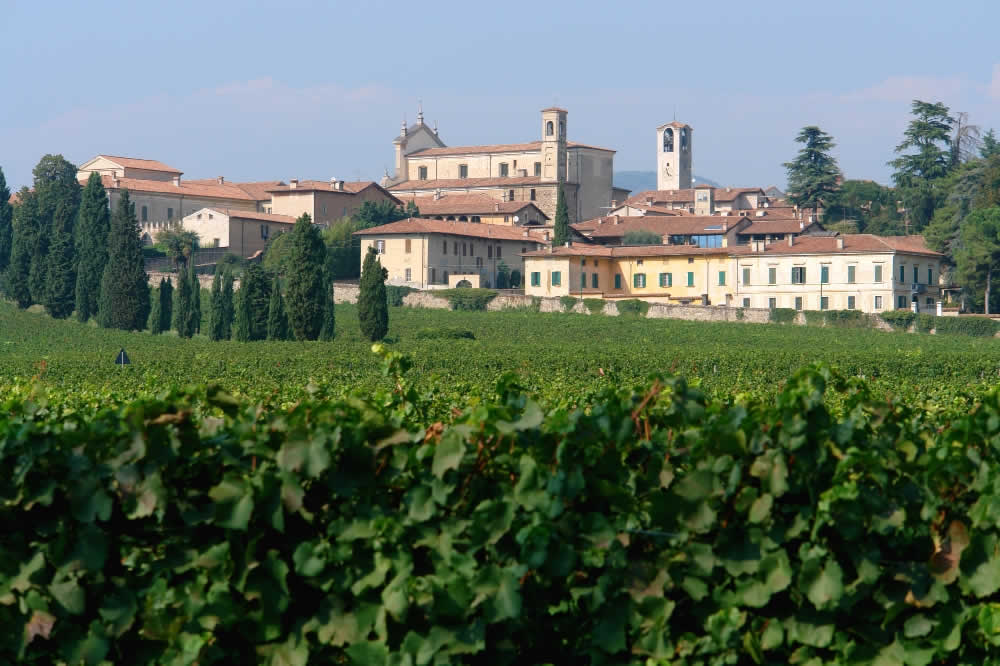
Franciacorta vineyard in Erbusco

Lombardy wine is the Italian wine produced in Lombardy. The region is known particularly for its sparkling wines made in the Franciacorta and Oltrepò Pavese areas. Lombardy also produces still red, white and rosé wines made from a variety of local and international grapes, including Nebbiolo wines in the Valtellina region and Trebbiano di Lugana white wines produced with the Chiaretto style rosé along the shores of Lake Garda. The wine region currently has 22 denominazione di origine controllata (DOC), 5 denominazione di origine controllata e garantita (DOCG) and at least 13 indicazione geografica tipica designations.

- Franciacorta
- Nebbiolo red
- Bellavista
- Santi
- Nino Negri
- Bonarda Lombardy
- Trebbiano di Lugana
- Inferno (Valtellina)
- Grumello (Valtellina)
- Sassella (Valtellina)

=== Languages ===
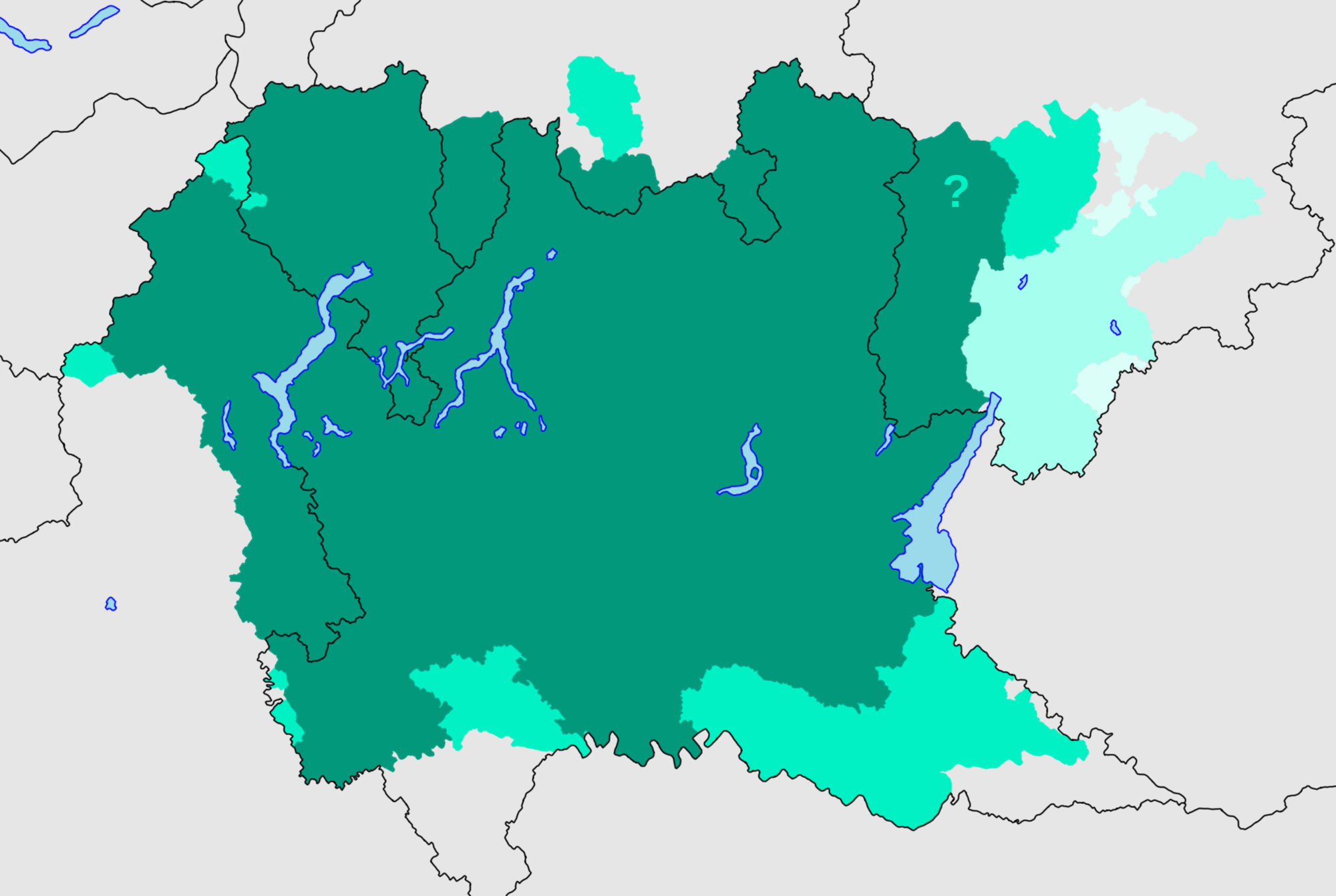
Lombard language distribution in Europe: Areas where Lombard is spoken Areas where Lombard is spoken alongside other languages (Alemannic, Ladin and Romansh) and areas of linguistic transition (with Piedmontese, with Emilian and with Venetian) Areas of influence of Lombard (Tridentine dialect)

Lombard language is widely used in Lombardy, in diglossia with Italian. Lombard is a language belonging to the Gallo-Italic group within the Romance languages characterized by a Celtic linguistic substratum and a Lombardic linguistic superstratum. It is a cluster of homogeneous varieties used by at least 3,500,000 native speakers in Lombardy and some areas of neighbouring regions, such as the eastern part of Piedmont and the southern Switzerland cantons of Ticino and Grisons. The language is also spoken in Santa Catarina in Brazil by Lombard immigrants from the Province of Bergamo, in Italy.

The Celtic linguistic substratum of modern Lombard and the neighbouring languages of Northern Italy is self-evident and so the Lombard language is classified as a Gallo-Italic language (from the ancient Roman name for the Celts, Gauls). Roman domination shaped the dialects spoken in the area, which was called Cisalpine Gaul by the Romans, and much of the lexicon and grammar of the Lombard language have their origin in Latin. However, that influence was not homogeneous since idioms of different areas were influenced by previous linguistic substrata, and each area was marked by a stronger or weaker Latinisation or the preservation of ancient Celtic characteristics.

The main varieties of the Lombard language are Western Lombard (spoken in the provinces of Varese, Como, Lecco, Sondrio, Monza and Brianza, Milan, Lodi and Pavia), Eastern Lombard (in the provinces of Bergamo and Brescia, in Cremasco, in Upper Mantua and in the Lecco municipalities of Val San Martino), the Alpine Lombard (in Ticino and in Italian Grisons, in the north of Lombardy and Piedmont and in some areas of Trentino) and the Southern Lombard, in transition with the Emilian language (in the provinces of Cremona and Mantua); in the southern part of the province of Mantua and in Casalasco (south-eastern area of the province of Cremona) Emilian language is spoken.

The Lombard language should not be confused with that of the Lombards – Lombardic language, a Germanic language extinct since the Middle Ages. Lombard is considered a minority language that is structurally separate from Italian by both Ethnologue and the UNESCO Red Book on Endangered Languages. However, Italy and Switzerland do not recognize Lombard speakers as a linguistic minority. Traditionally, the Lombard dialects have been classified into the Eastern, Western, Alpine and Southern Lombard dialects.

=== Art and architecture ===
==== From prehistory to the classical era ====
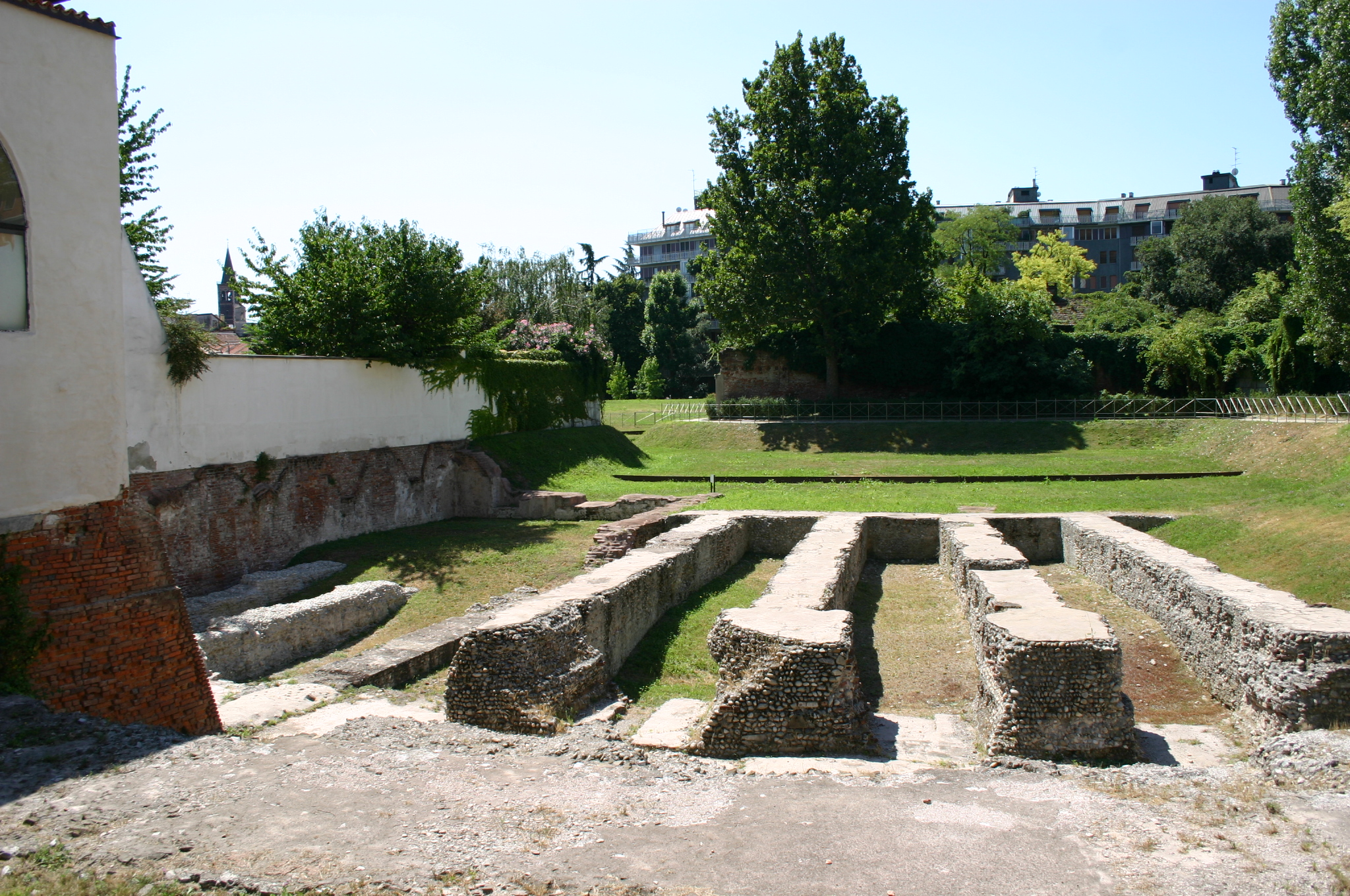
The remains of the Milan amphitheatre, which can be found inside the archaeological park of the Antiquarium in Milan

The first artistic evidence in Lombardy dates back to the Mesolithic period when, at the end of the Würm glaciation, the historical cycle of the Rock Drawings in Valcamonica began, which continued and subsequently expanded in the Neolithic and the Copper Age to end only in Roman and medieval times. The Camunian cycle is considered one of the most important testimonies of prehistory worldwide and is therefore included in the list of World Heritage Site.

Furthermore, further finds have been found of the presence of prehistoric populations in the Lombardy territory, also included in the world heritage of humanity with the serial site of the "Prehistoric pile dwellings around the Alps", with several locations located in Lombardy.

The Celts left evidence scattered throughout the archaeological museums of the region, while the Etruscan presence is attested in the Mantua area. Following the Roman conquest, the artistic evolution of the region veered towards the styles of the conquerors from the late republican period to the Roman imperial era: monumental remains of this historical era can be seen in Brescia (Latin: Brixia) and Milan (Latin: Mediolanum).

==== From late antiquity to the modern era ====
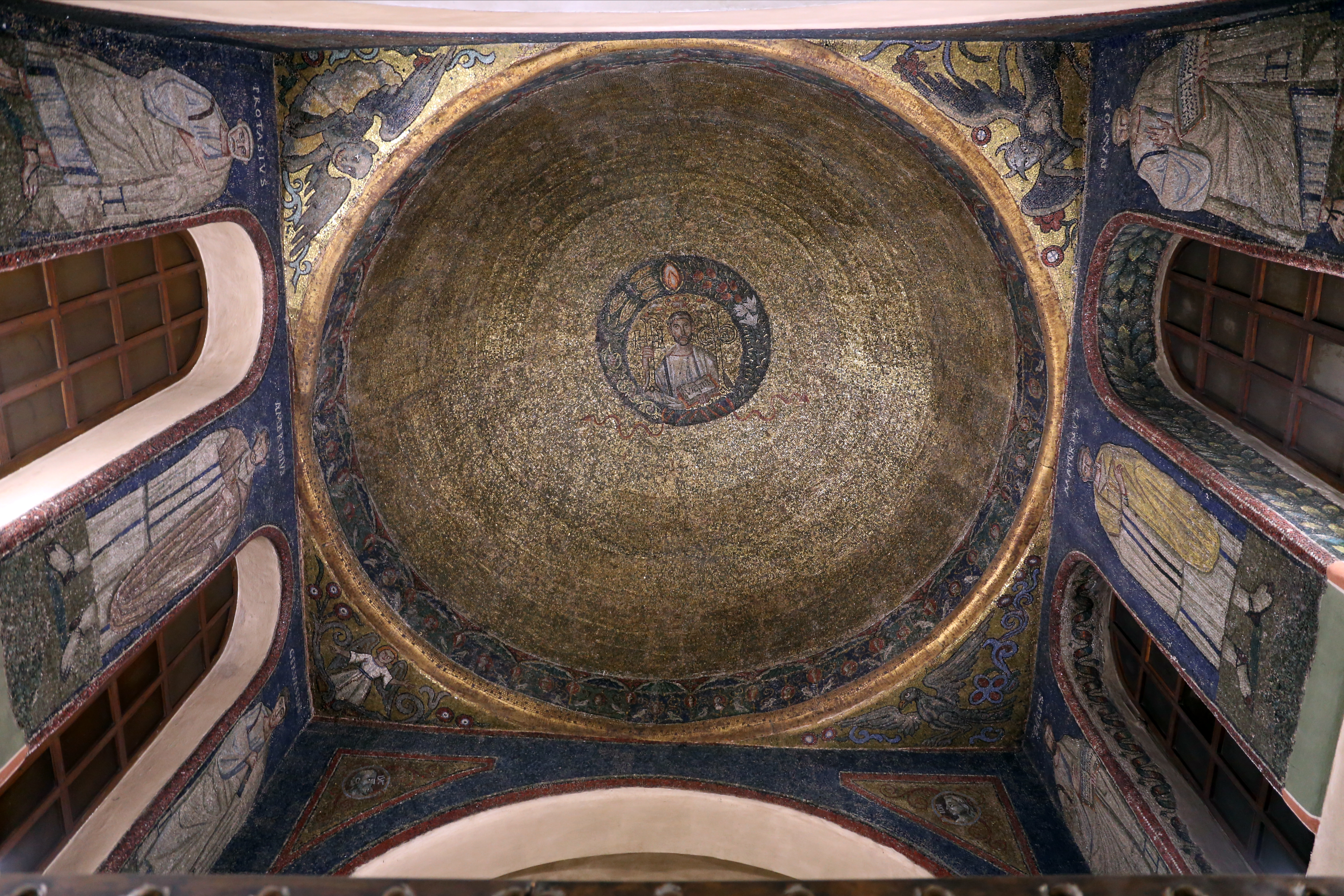
Early Christian chapel located inside the Basilica of Sant'Ambrogio in Milan

In the late ancient period, the Lombardy territory acquired importance, with Milan being the capital of the Western Roman Empire, and consequently, the artistic production also increased, of which evidence remains especially in sacred architecture with the construction of Early Christian churches, particularly in Milan.

The subsequent early medieval period, coeval with and following the Migration Period, will be of capital importance for the development of regional art: the stylistic features of barbarian art introduced by the new populations in fact brought a decisive contribution, merging with late ancient models (which are maintained with continuity) as well as thanks to Byzantine influences, for the creation of a truly Lombard art. In fact, upon leaving the early medieval period, we began to talk about artistic styles specific to Lombardy such as the Lombard Romanesque.

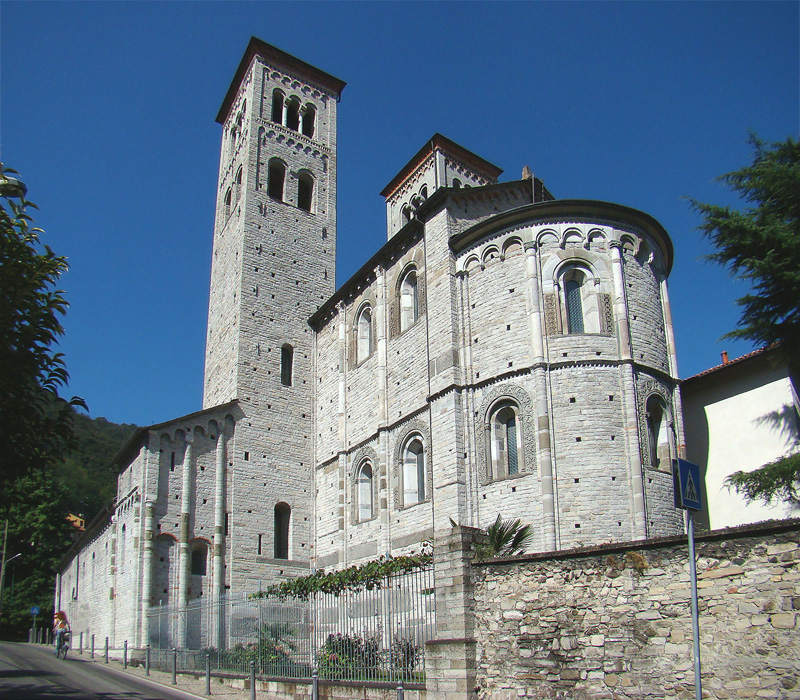
Basilica of Sant'Abbondio in Como

Noteworthy examples of the Lombard Romanesque style are the work of the Comacine masters, in particular in the Basilica of Sant'Ambrogio and Basilica of San Michele Maggiore and in the Basilica of Sant'Abbondio, in the Como area. The most important contribution between the 6th and 8th centuries came from the Lombards who, occupying a large part of Italy, established their capital in Pavia and made Lombardy the fulcrum of their kingdom bringing their art with them, of which there remain both significant testimonies (in particular in Brescia, Monza, Pavia and Castelseprio) and a substantial influence on subsequent artistic developments.

In the Lombard area, the Carolingian period saw substantial artistic continuity with the previous Lombard period. The lower production of monumental buildings typical of these centuries is counterbalanced by numerous minor artefacts of great value, such as the Cross of Agilulf, the Cross of Desiderius and the Gospel Book of Theodelinda. Also in Lombardy are some of the greatest expressions of Lombard sculpture, such as the slab with peacock in the Museum of Santa Giulia in Brescia or the Plutei of Theodota in the Pavia Civic Museums. The following centuries, as already mentioned, were characterized by artistic styles typical of Lombardy such as the Lombard Romanesque, the Lombard Gothic, the Lombard Renaissance and the Lombard Seicento. Finally, we must not forget, especially during the Renaissance, the contributions and stimuli left in local art by some great Renaissance masters who worked in Milan at the Sforza court, such as Filarete, Donato Bramante and Leonardo da Vinci and in Mantua at the Gonzaga court, like Andrea Mantegna and Giulio Romano.

==== Contemporary age ====
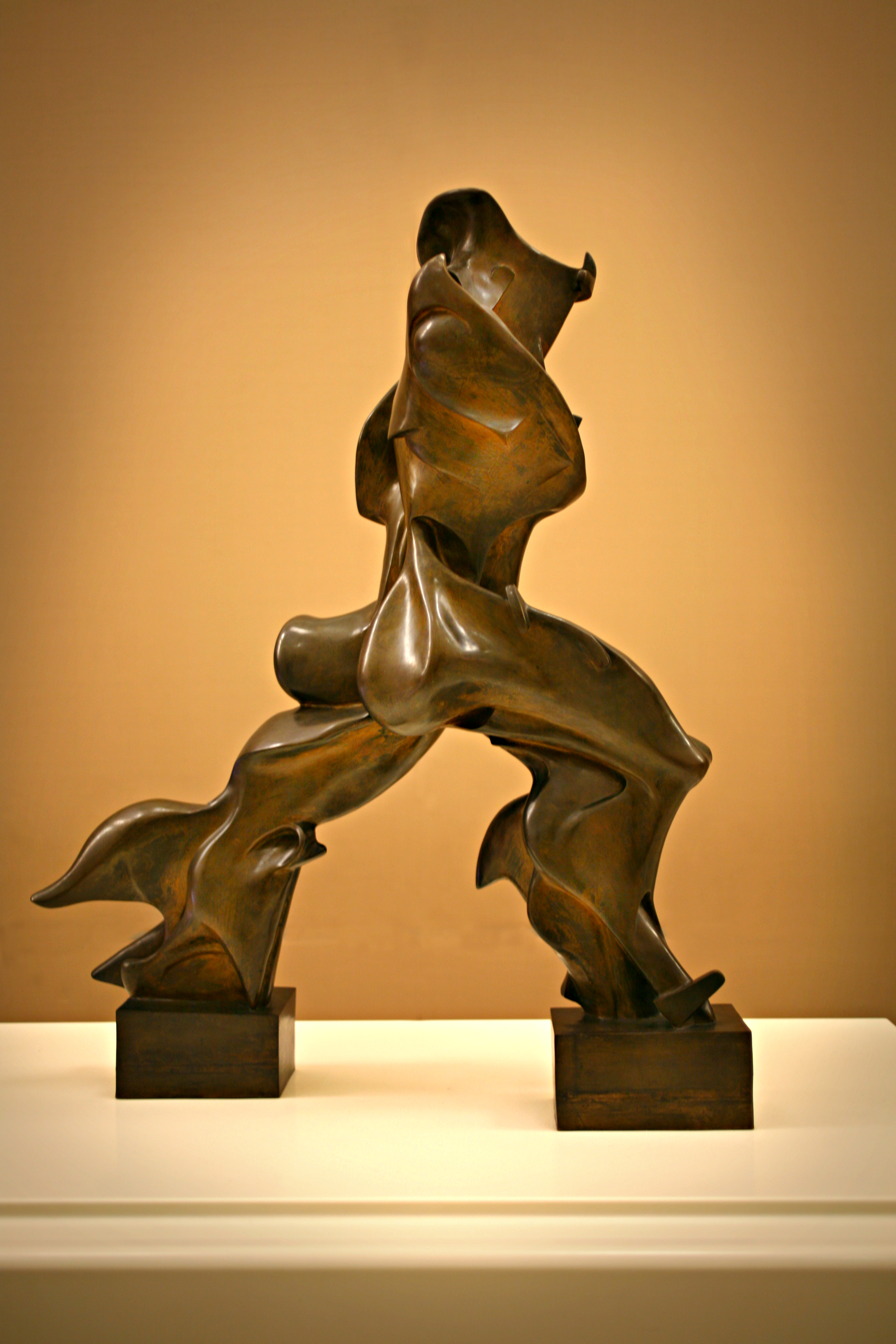
Umberto Boccioni, Unique Forms of Continuity in Space, example from 1949 exhibited at the Museo del Novecento in Milan

In February 1910 the painters Umberto Boccioni, Carlo Carrà, Giacomo Balla, Gino Severini and Luigi Russolo signed the Manifesto dei pittori futuristi in Milan and in April of the same year the Manifesto tecnico della pittura futurista,, which they contributed, together with others posters signed in other Italian cities, to found the artistic movement of Futurism. Upon the death of Umberto Boccioni in 1916, Carrà and Severini found themselves in a phase of evolution towards cubist painting, consequently, the Milanese group disbanded, moving the headquarters of the movement from Milan to Rome, with the consequent birth of the "second Futurism".

Lombardy was the birthplace of another important artistic movement of the 20th century, the Novecento, which was born in Milan at the end of 1922. It was started by a group of artists composed of Mario Sironi, Achille Funi, Leonardo Dudreville, Anselmo Bucci, Emilio Malerba, Pietro Marussig and Ubaldo Oppi who, at the Pesaro Gallery in Milan, joined together in the new movement baptized Novecento by Bucci. These artists, who felt they were translators of the spirit of the 20th century, came from different experiences and artistic currents, but linked by a common sense of "return to order" in art after the avant-garde experiments especially of Futurism: in this sense this artistic movement also adopted the name of simplified Neoclassicism. The Novecento movement also manifested itself in literature with Massimo Bontempelli and above all in architecture with the famous architects Giovanni Muzio, Giò Ponti, Paolo Mezzanotte and others. Some of the works of the major Lombard artists of the 20th century are exhibited at the Museo del Novecento in Milan.

=== Historical and artistic villages ===
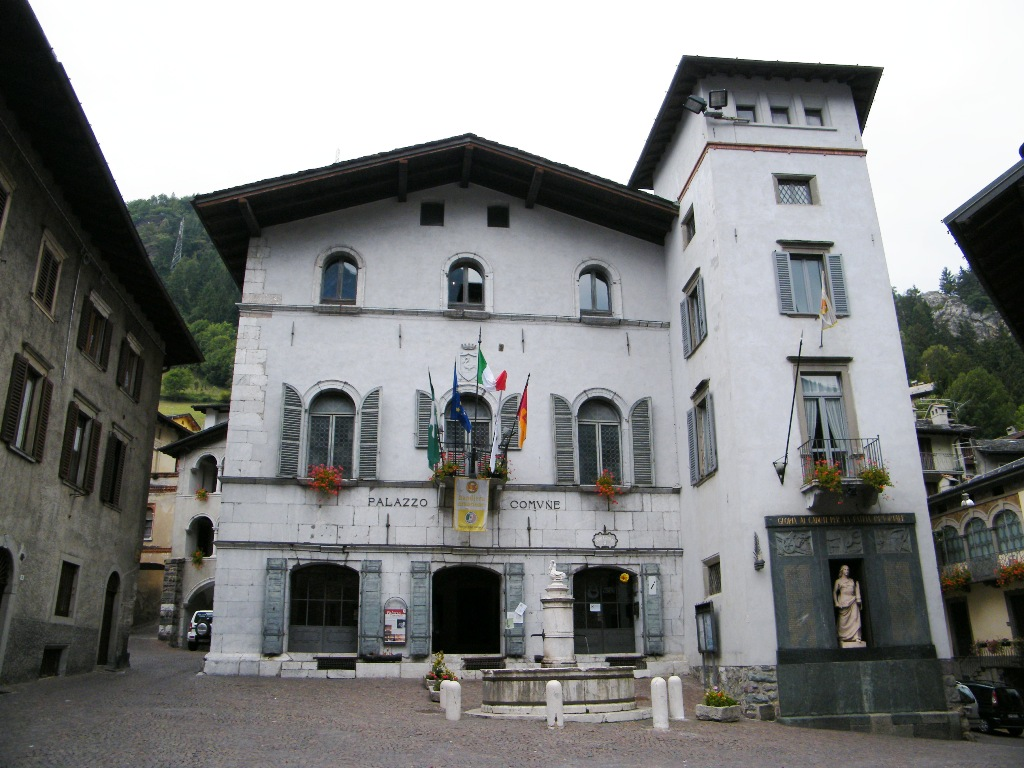
Gromo

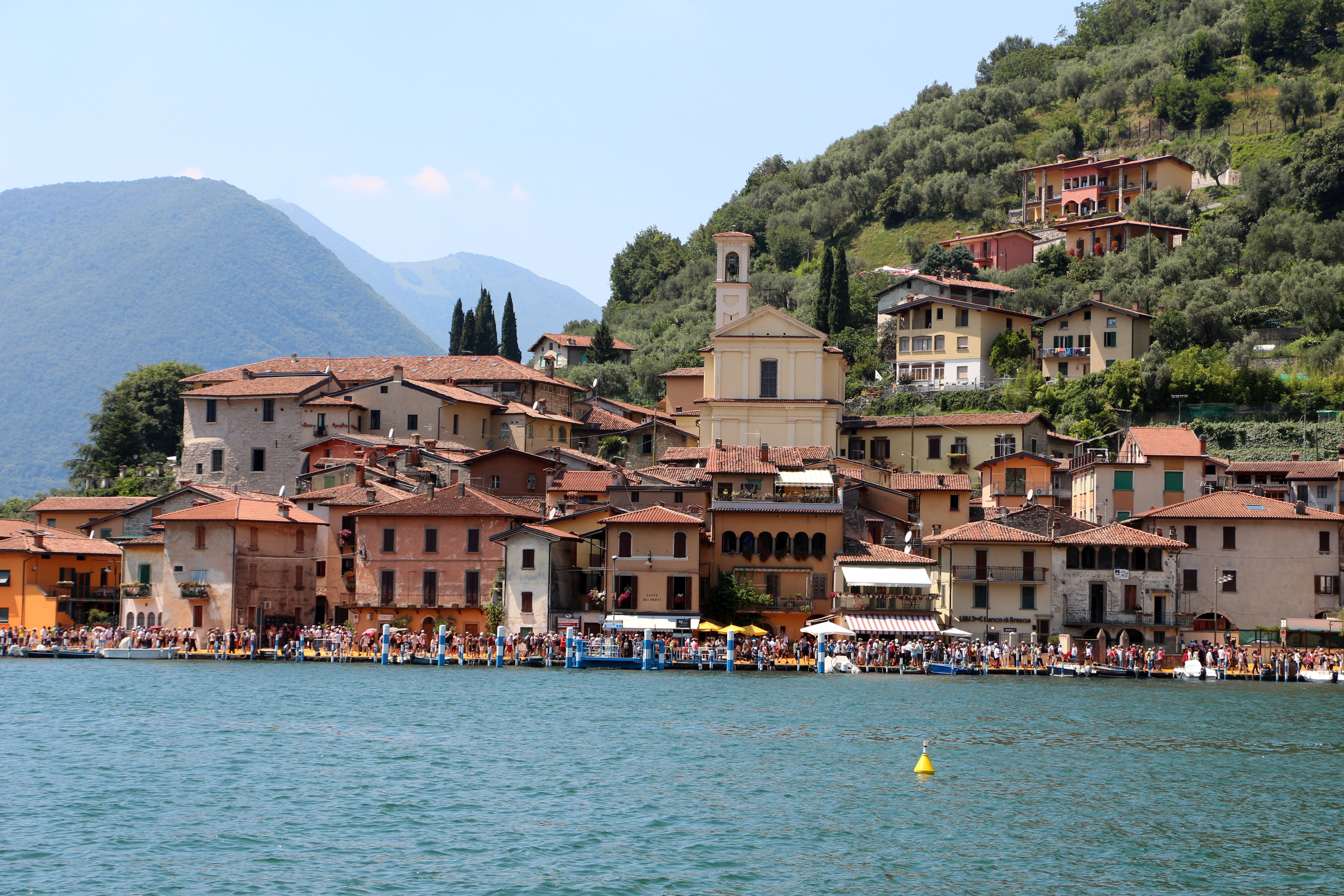
Monte Isola

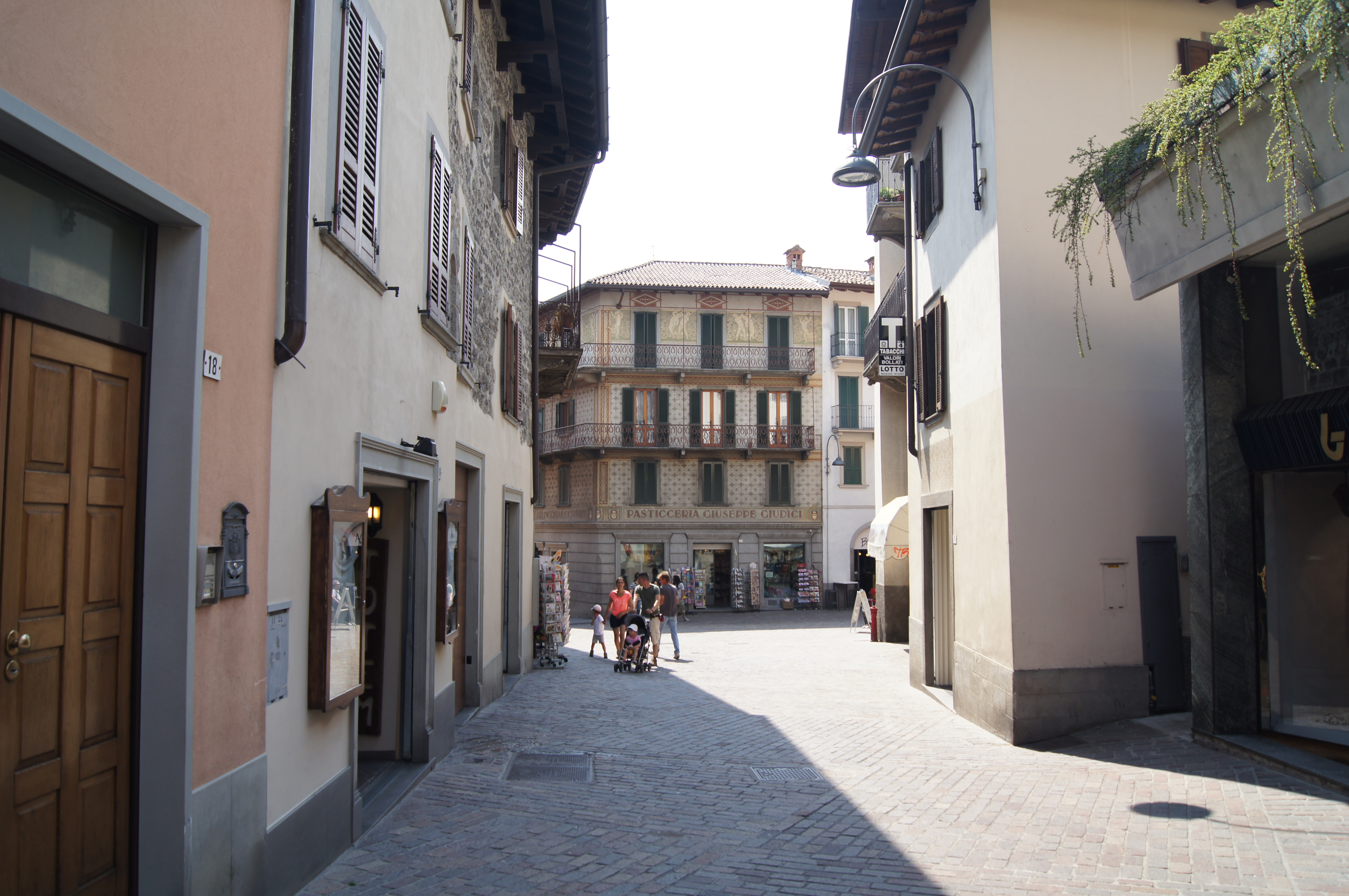
Clusone

Lombardy has many small and picturesque villages, 26 of them have been selected by I Borghi più belli d'Italia (English: The most beautiful villages of Italy), a non-profit private association of small Italian towns of strong historical and artistic interest, that was founded on the initiative of the Tourism Council of the National Association of Italian Municipalities. The Lombard villages that are members of the association I Borghi più belli d'Italia ("The most beautiful villages in Italy") are:

- Bellano
- Bienno
- Borgo Santa Caterina
- Cassinetta di Lugagnano
- Castellaro Lagusello
- Castelponzone
- Clusone
- Cornello dei Tasso
- Fortunago
- Gardone Riviera
- Golferenzo
- Gradella
- Grazie
- Gromo
- Lovere
- Maccagno Imperiale
- Monte Isola
- Morimondo
- Pomponesco
- Sabbioneta
- San Benedetto Po
- Soncino
- Tremezzo
- Tremosine sul Garda
- Varzi
- Zavattarello

=== Literature ===
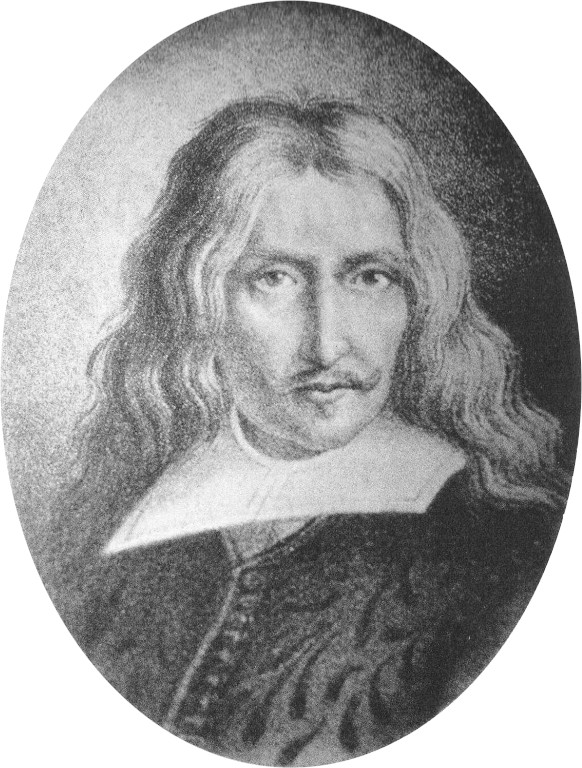
Carlo Maria Maggi

The first texts written in the vernacular Lombard language date back to the 13th century. These are mainly works of a didactic-religious nature; an example is the Sermon Divin by Pietro da Barsegapè, which narrates the Passion of Jesus. Very important is the contribution to Lombard literature of Bonvesin de la Riva, who wrote, among other works, the Liber di Tre Scricciur, the De magnalibus urbis Mediolani ("The Wonders of Milan"), and an etiquette, the De quinquaginta curialitatibus ad mensam ("Fifty table courtesies").

From the 15th century, the prestige of literary Tuscan began to supplant the use of northern vernaculars which had been used, although influenced by the Florentine vernacular, also in chancellor and administrative contexts. Despite this, starting from this century, there began to be the first signs of a true Lombard literature, with literary compositions in the Lombard language both in the western part of the region and in the eastern one.

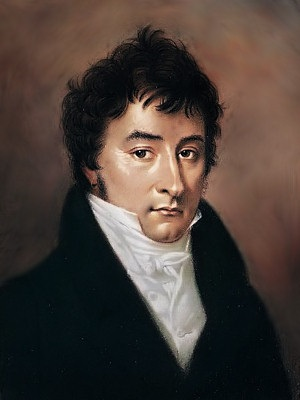
Carlo Porta

The 17th century also saw the emergence of the figure of the playwright Carlo Maria Maggi, who created, among other things, the Milanese mask of Meneghino. Also in the 17th century, the first bosinade were born, occasional popular poems written on loose sheets of paper and posted in squares or read (or even sung) in public; they had great success and widespread diffusion until the first decades of the 20th century. Milanese literature had a strong development in the 18th century: some important names emerged, including the famous poet Giuseppe Parini, who wrote some compositions in the Lombard language.

The beginning of the 19th century was dominated by the figure of Carlo Porta, recognized by many as the most important author of Lombard literature, and also included among the greatest poets of Italian national literature. With him, some of the highest peaks of literary expressiveness in the Lombard language were reached, which clearly emerged in works such as La Ninetta del Verzee, Desgrazzi de Giovannin Bongee, La guerra di pret e Lament del Marchionn de gamb avert. Milanese poetic production took on such important dimensions that in 1815 the scholar Francesco Cherubini published a four-volume anthology of Lombard literature, which included texts written from the 17th century to his day.

=== Main sights ===
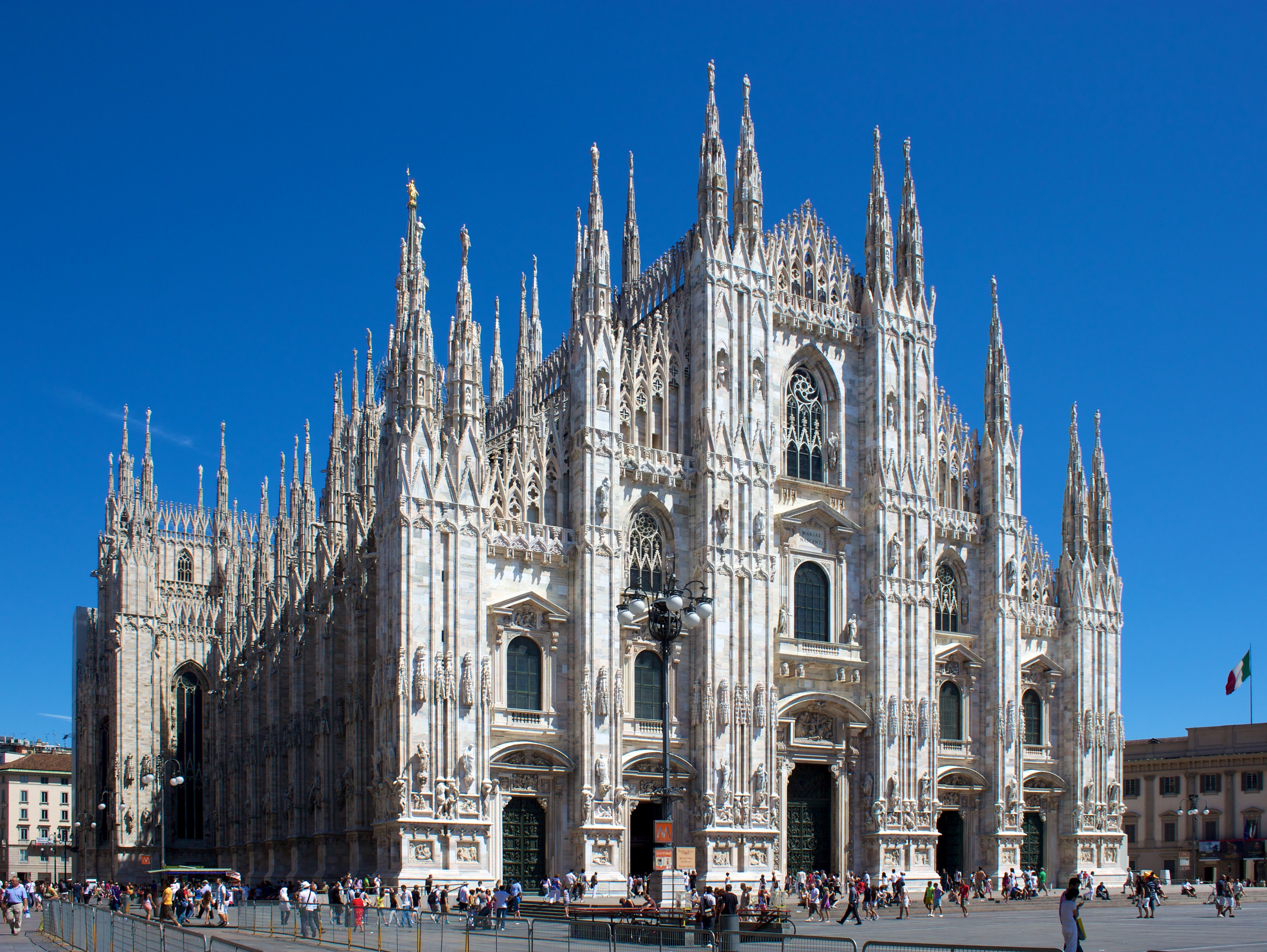
Milan Cathedral is the largest church in the Italian Republic—the larger St. Peter's Basilica is in the State of Vatican City, a sovereign state—and the third largest in the world.

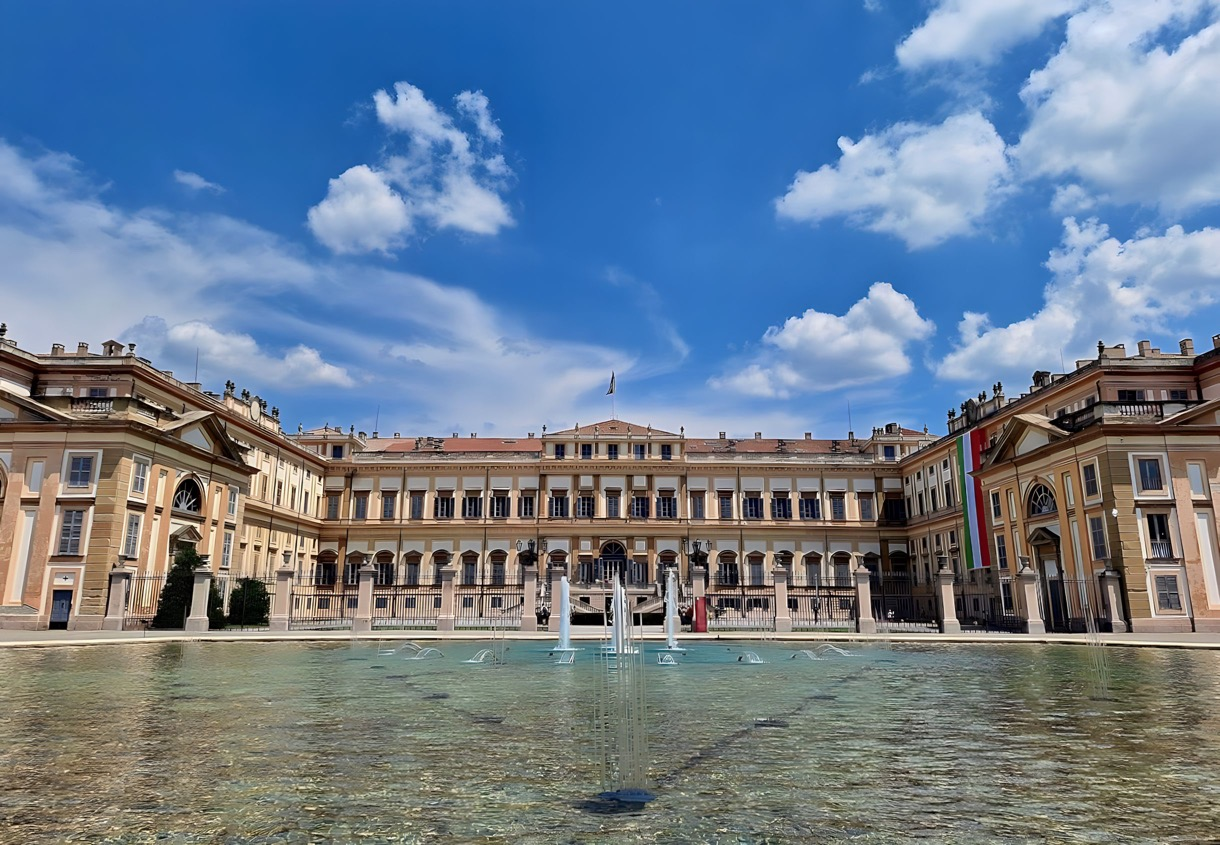
Royal Villa of Monza

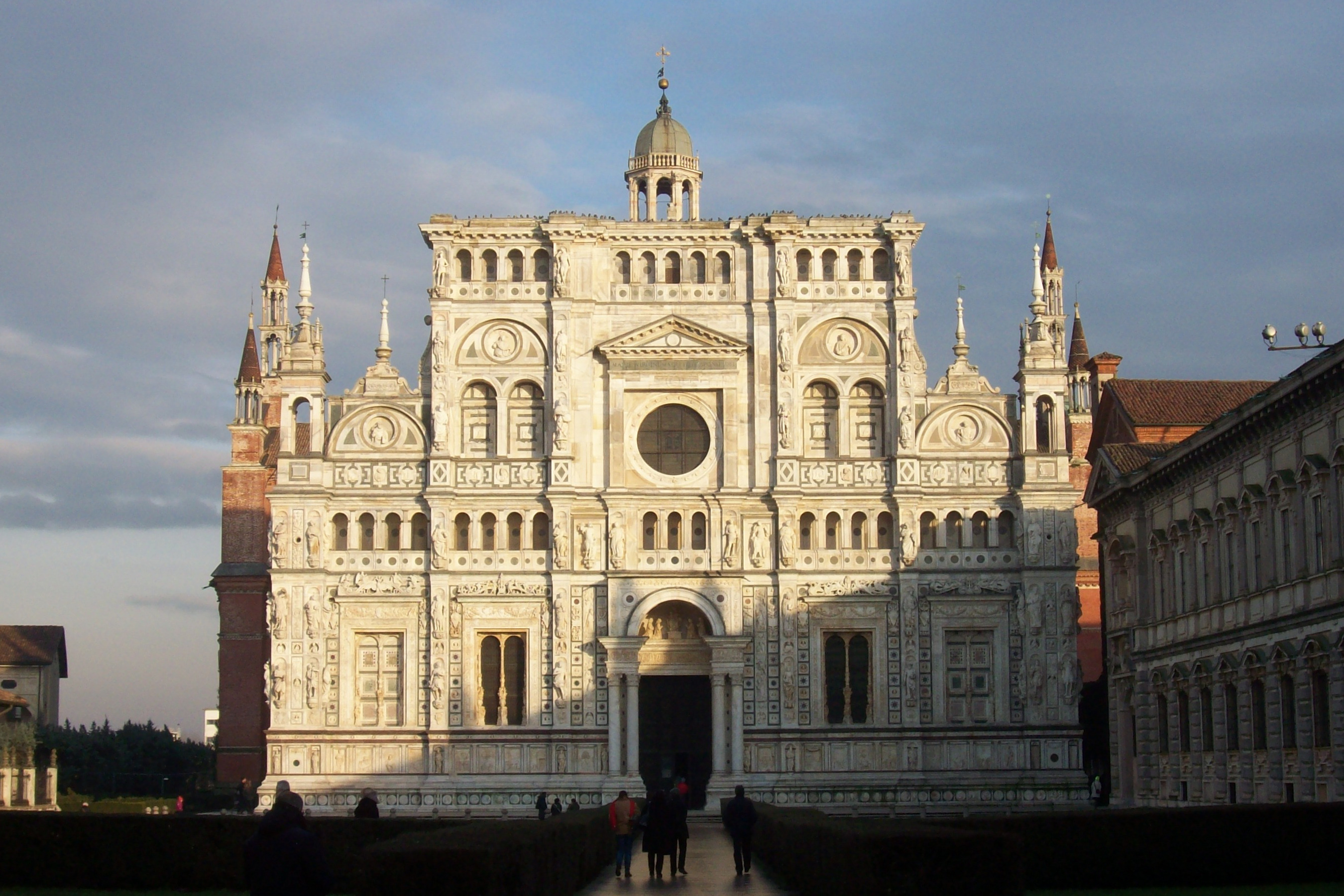
Certosa di Pavia

- Accademia Carrara, Bergamo
- Archaeological park of Castelseprio, Castelseprio
- Basilica of San Lorenzo, Milan
- Basilica di Sant'Ambrogio, Milan
- Basilica of Sant'Eustorgio, Milan
- Bellagio
- Brera Gallery, Milan
- Castello Sforzesco, Milan
- Castelseprio archaeological site
- Duomo and Torrazzo, Cremona
- Cathedral of Milan
- Cathedral of Pavia
- Certosa di Pavia
- Como Cathedral and Basilica of Sant'Abbondio, Como
- Duomo Nuovo, Brescia
- The fortified Venetian walls, Bergamo
- Lake Como
- Lake Garda
- Lake Iseo
- Roman and Longobard monuments in Brescia
- Royal Villa of Monza
- San Michele Maggiore, Pavia
- San Pietro in Ciel d'Oro, Pavia
- Santa Maria del Carmine, Pavia
- Santa Maria Maggiore and Cappella Colleoni, Bergamo
- Teatro alla Scala, Milan
- Tempio Civico della Beata Vergine Incoronata, Lodi
- Villa Toeplitz, Varese
- Visconti Castle, Pavia

=== Museums and art galleries ===
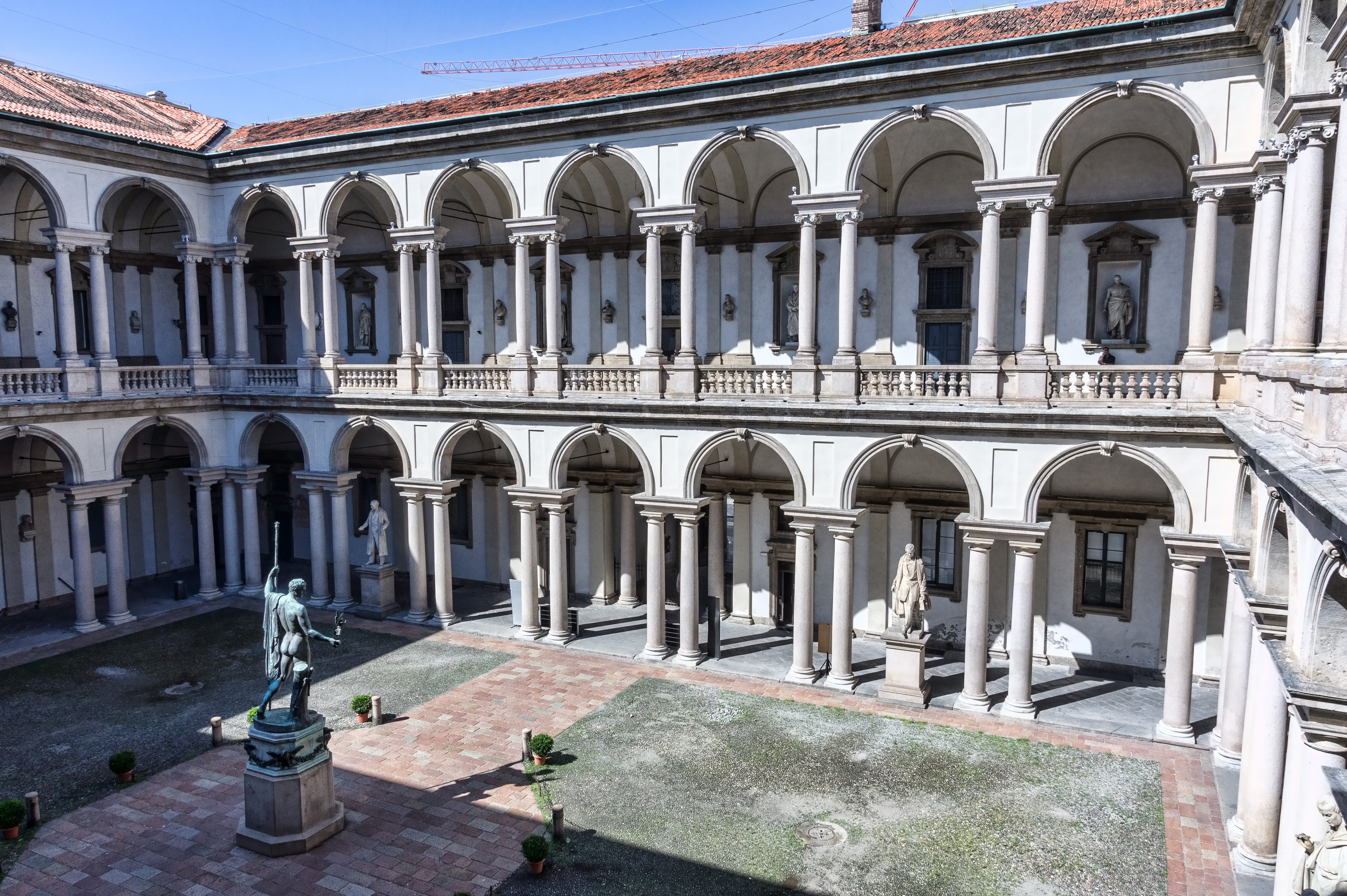
Pinacoteca di Brera in Milan

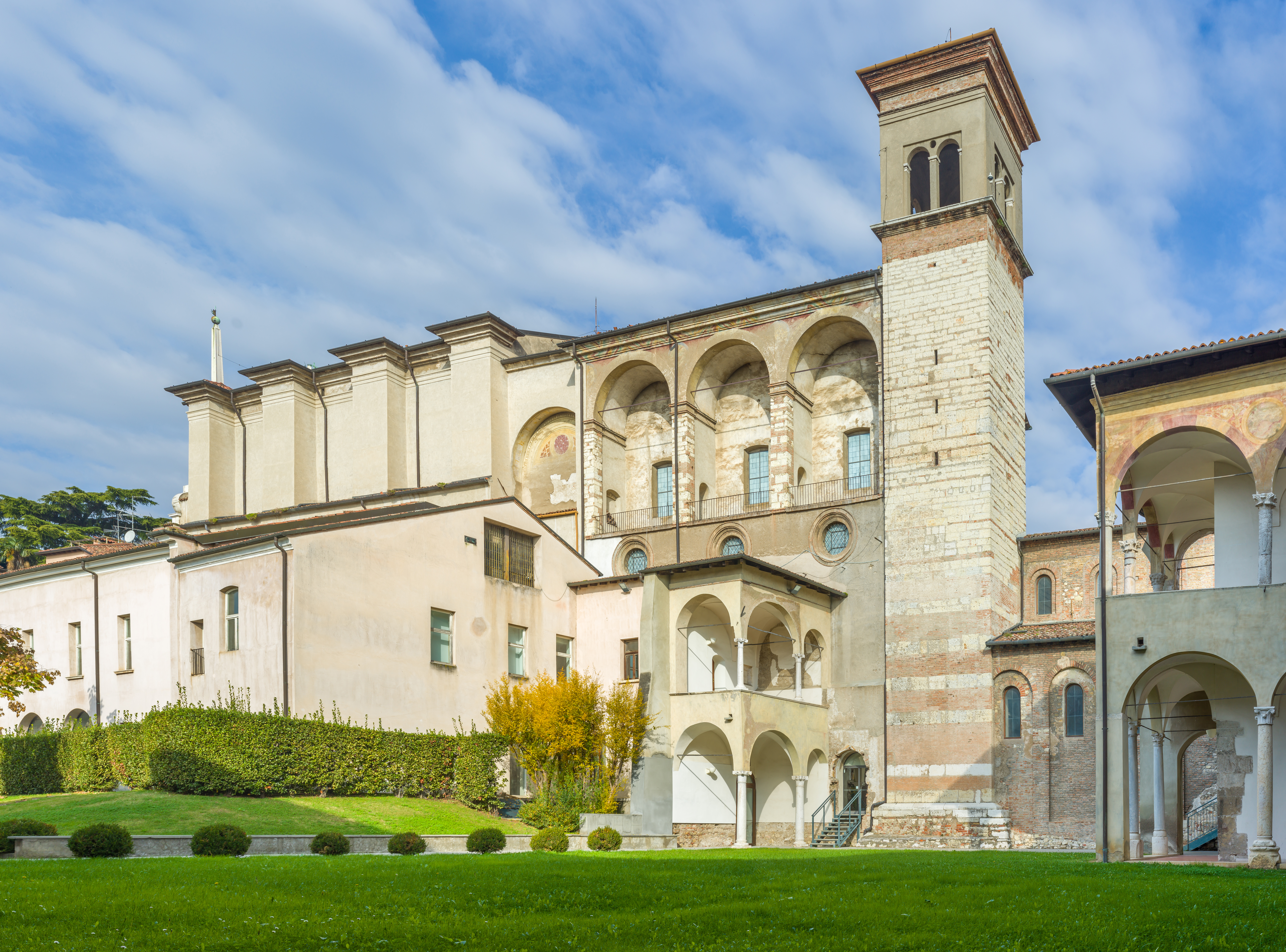
Santa Giulia Museum in Brescia

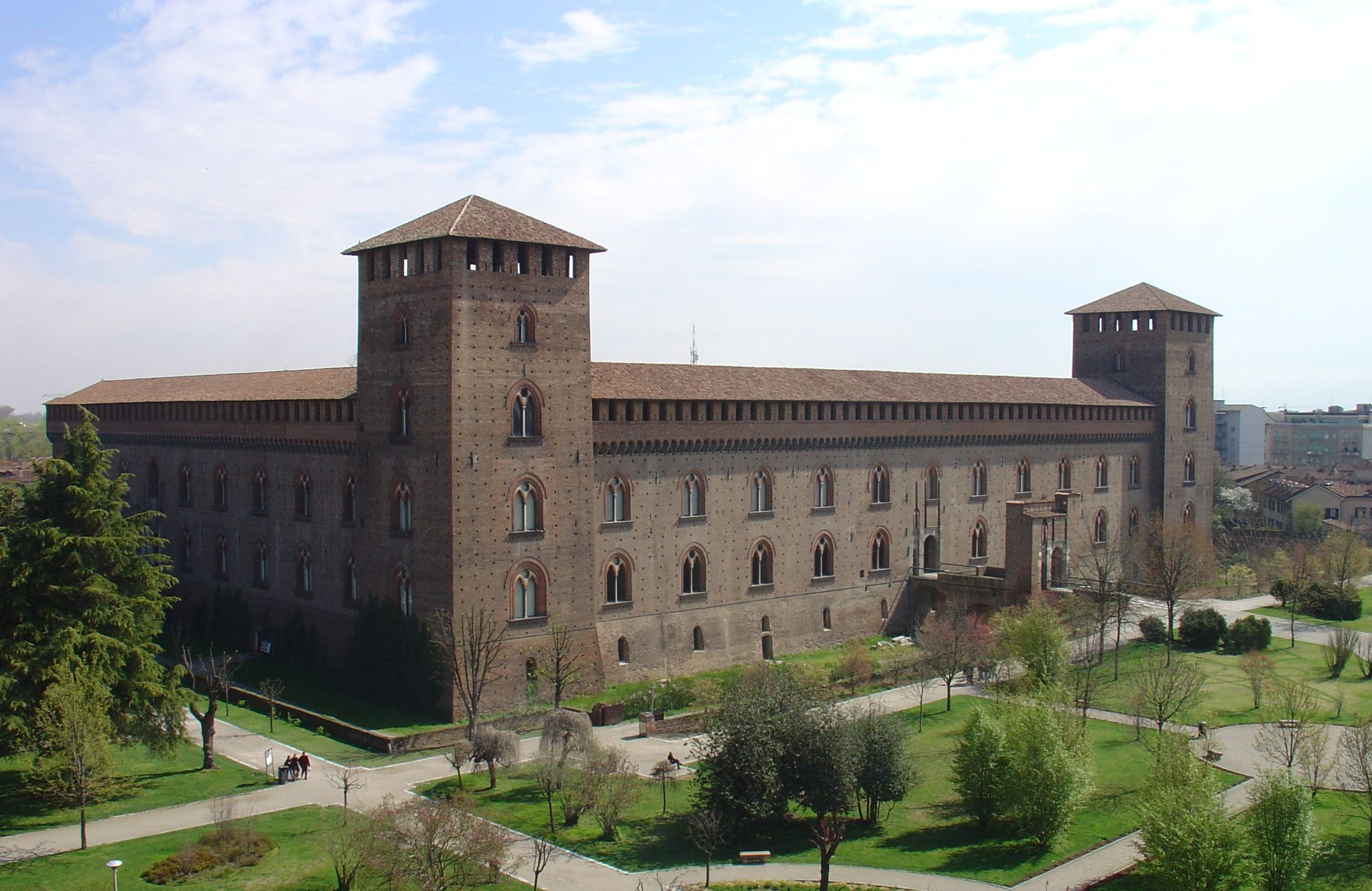
The Visconti Castle of Pavia, seat of the Pavia Civic Museums

Lombardy has more than 300 museums in subjects such as ethnographic, historical, technical-scientific, artistic and naturalistic fields. Among the region's most famous museums are:

- Accademia Carrara (Bergamo)
- Accademia Nazionale Virgiliana (Mantua)
- Antique Furniture & Wooden Sculpture Museum (Milan)
- Applied Arts Collection (Milan)
- Archaeological Museum (Milan)
- Civic Museum of Crema (Crema)
- Egyptian Museum (Milan)
- Gallerie di Piazza Scala (Milan)
- Mille Miglia (Brescia)
- Modern Art Gallery (Milan)
- Museum Sacred Art of the Nativity (Gandino)
- Museo Bagatti Valsecchi (Milan)
- Museo Diocesano (Milan)
- Museo Diocesano Adriano Bernareggi (Bergamo)
- Museum of Musical Instruments (Milan)
- Museo del Motociclo Moto Guzzi (Mandello al Lario)
- Museo del Novecento (Milan)
- Museo del Risorgimento (Milan)
- National Museum of Science and Technology "Leonardo da Vinci" (Milan)
- Museo di Palazzo d'Arco (Mantua)
- Museo di Palazzo Te (Mantua)
- Museo Etnografico Tiranese (Tirano)
- Museo Giuseppe Gianetti (Saronno)
- Museo Poldi Pezzoli (Milan)
- Museo storico Alfa Romeo (Arese)
- Museo Teatrale alla Scala (Milan)
- Natural History Museum of Milan (Milan)
- Natural History Museum of Pavia (Pavia)
- Padiglione d'Arte Contemporanea (Milan)
- Pavia Civic Museums (Pavia)
- Pinacoteca Ambrosiana (Milan)
- Pinacoteca di Brera (Milan)
- Royal Villa of Monza (Monza)
- Santa Giulia Museum (Brescia)
- Sforza Castle Pinacoteca (Milan)
- Volta Temple (Como)
- The Museum of Ancient Art (Milan)
- Triennale (Milan)
- University History Museum, University of Pavia
- Villa Olmo (Como)

=== Music ===
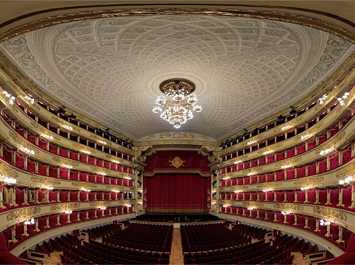
Founded in 1778, La Scala in Milan is the world's most famous opera house.

Each of Lombardy's 12 provinces has its own musical traditions. Bergamo is famous for being the birthplace of Gaetano Donizetti and home of the Teatro Donizetti; Brescia hosts the 1709 Teatro Grande; Cremona is regarded as the origin of the violin and is home to several of the most prestigious luthiers; and Mantua was one of the founding and most important cities in 16th- and 17th-century opera and classical music.

Other cities such as Lecco, Lodi, Varese and Pavia (Teatro Fraschini) also have rich musical traditions, but Milan is the centre of the Lombard musical scene. It was the workplace of Giuseppe Verdi, one of the most famous and influential 19th-century opera composers. The province has acclaimed theatres, such as the Piccolo Teatro and the Teatro Arcimboldi; however, the most famous is the 1778 Teatro alla Scala (popularly La Scala), the world's most famous opera house.

=== UNESCO World Heritage Sites ===
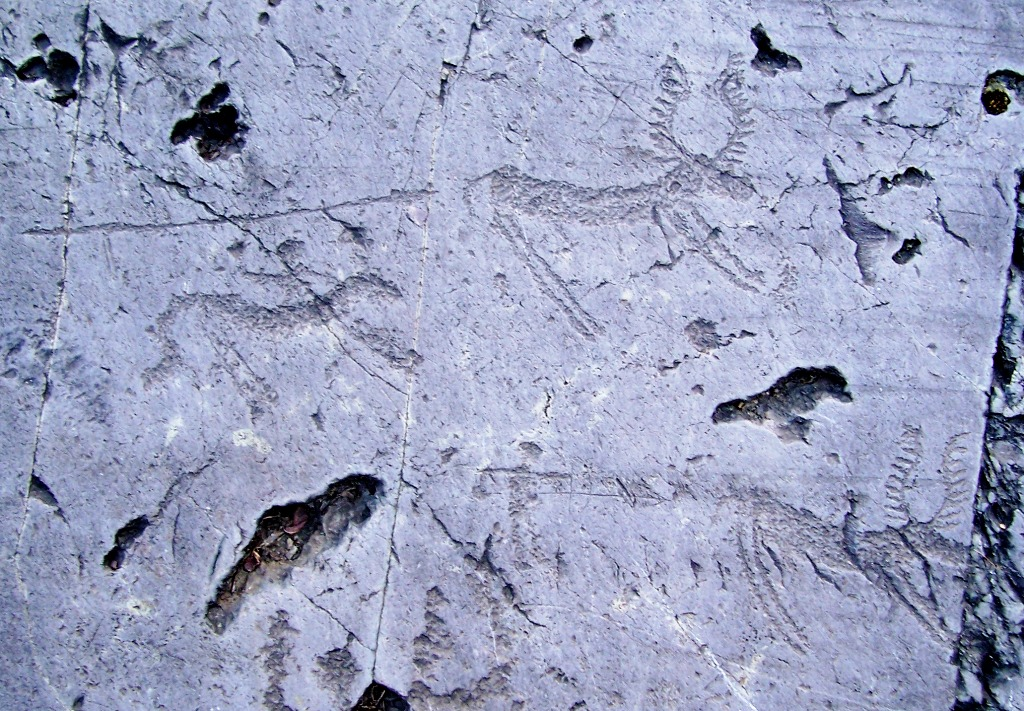
Deer hunting scene depicted in the Rock Drawings in Valcamonica

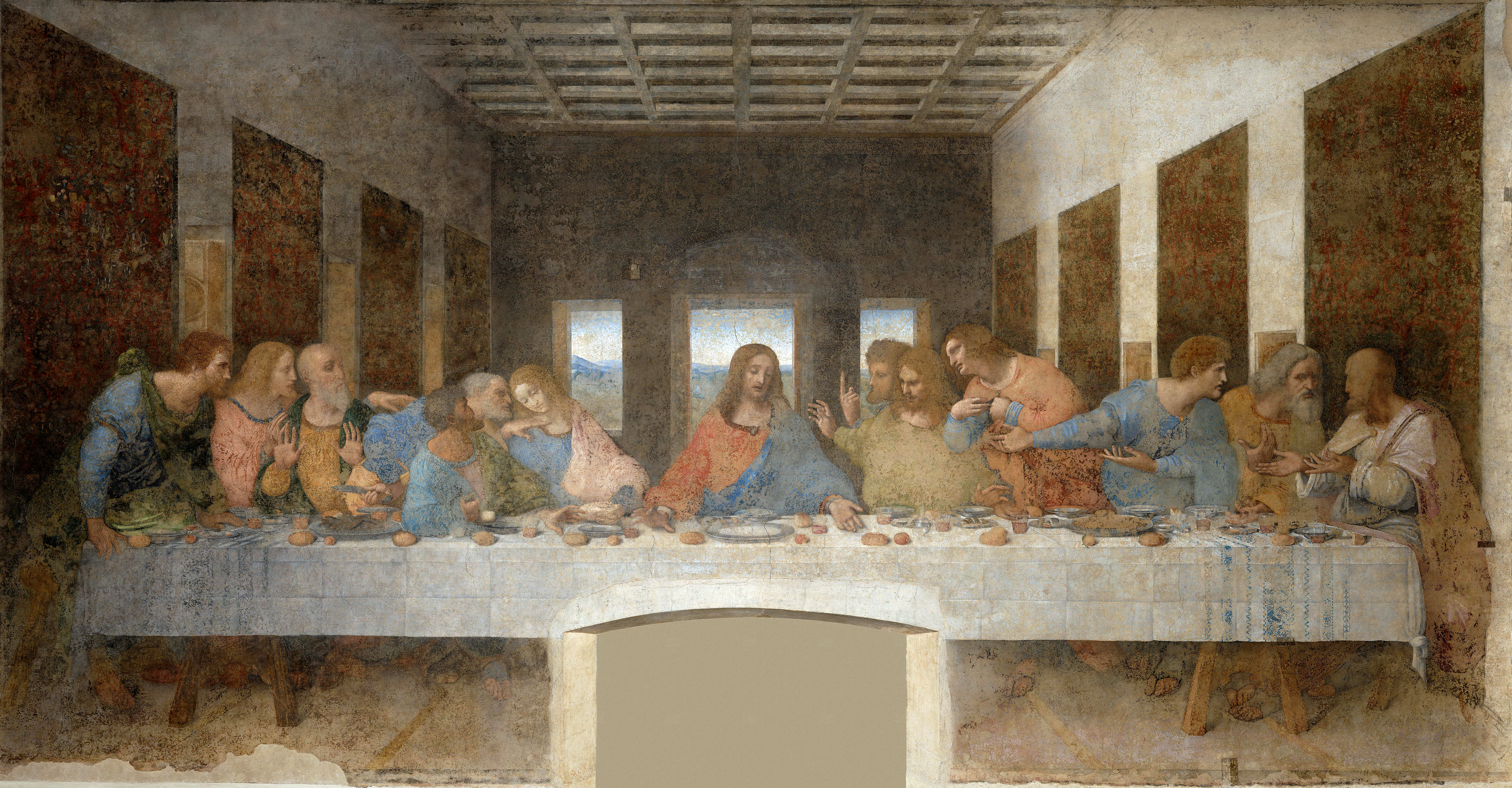
The Last Supper, Convent of Sta. Maria delle Grazie, Milan, Italy (1499), by Leonardo da Vinci

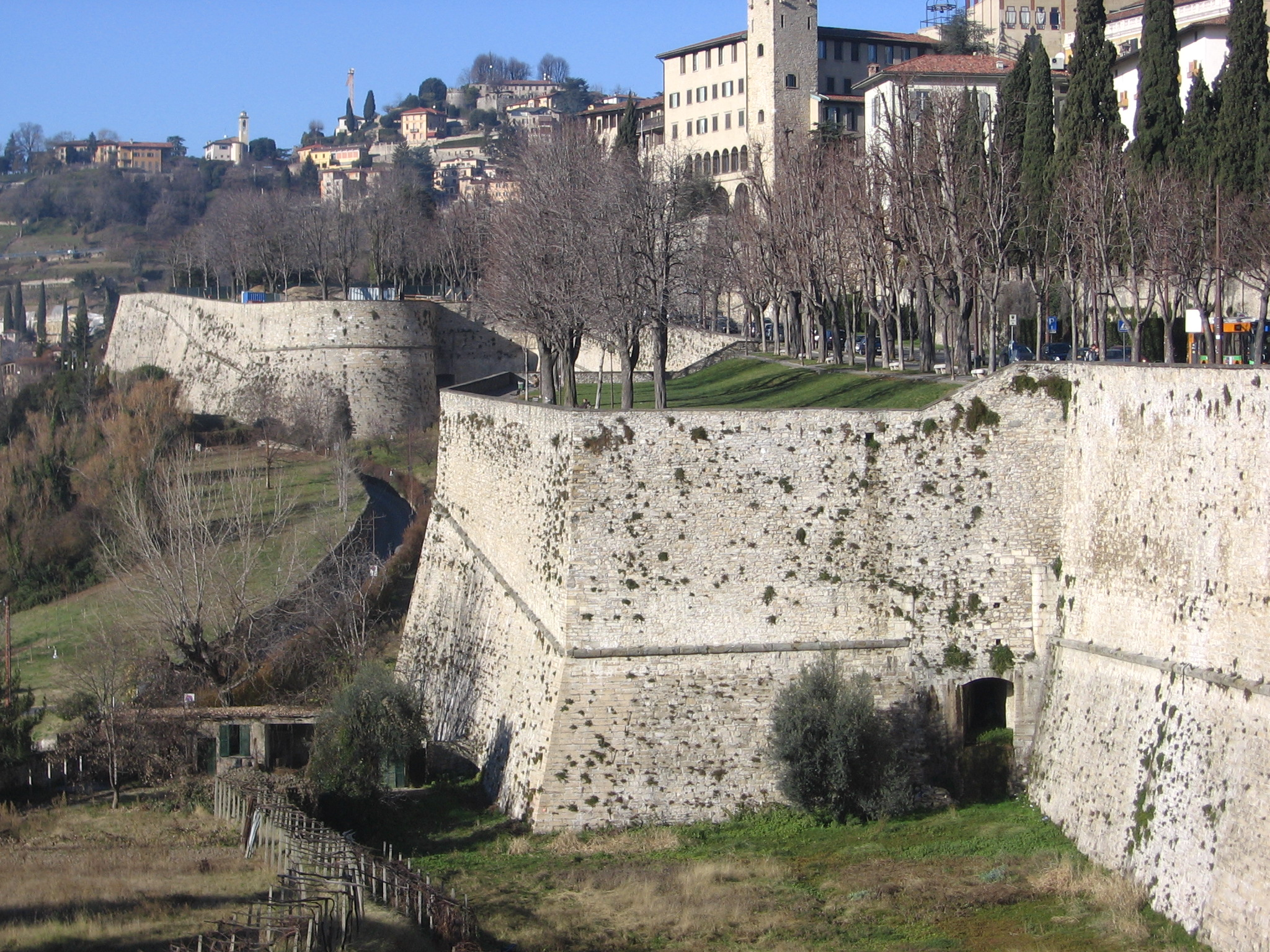
The Fortified City of Bergamo

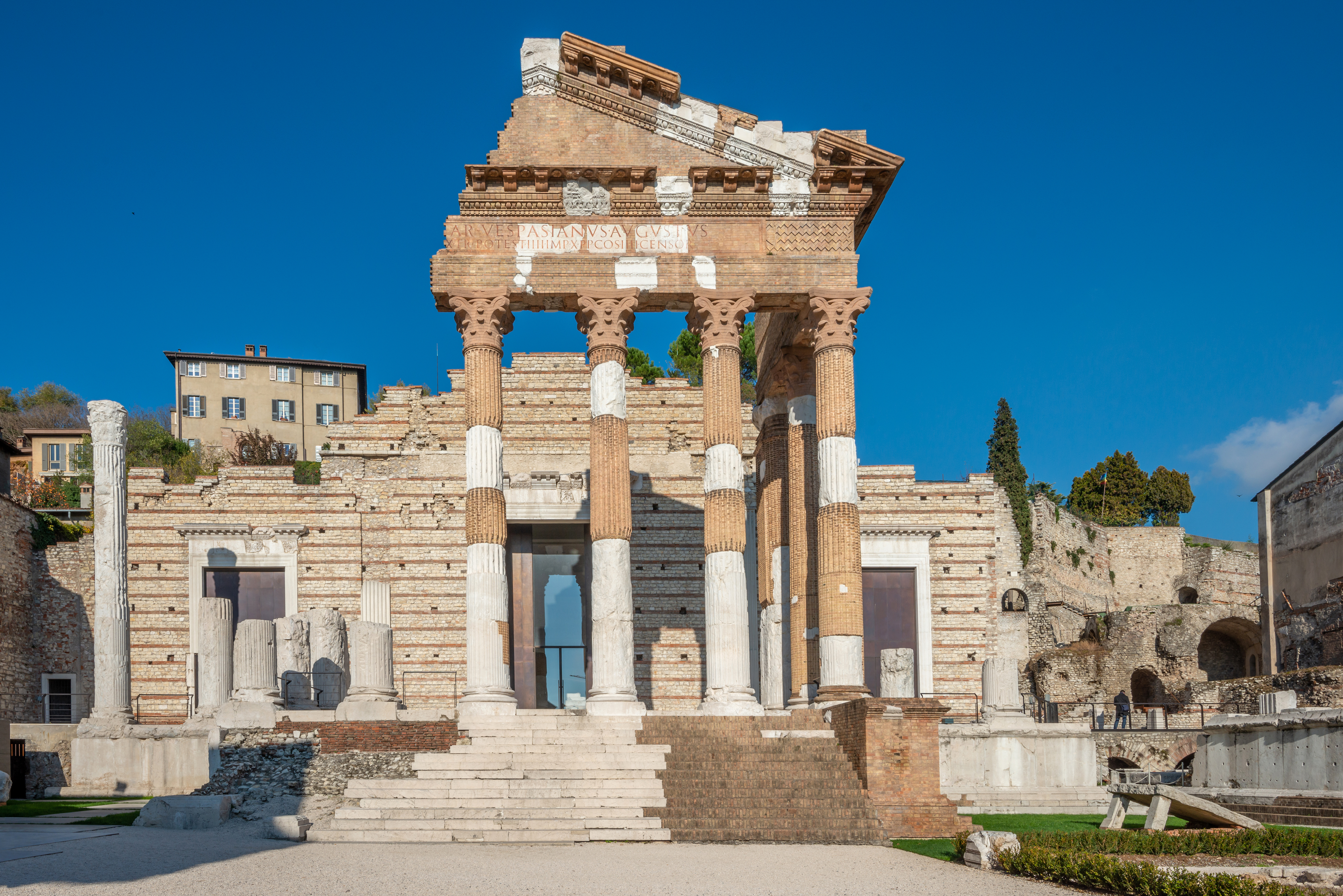
Remains of Roman forum in Brescia

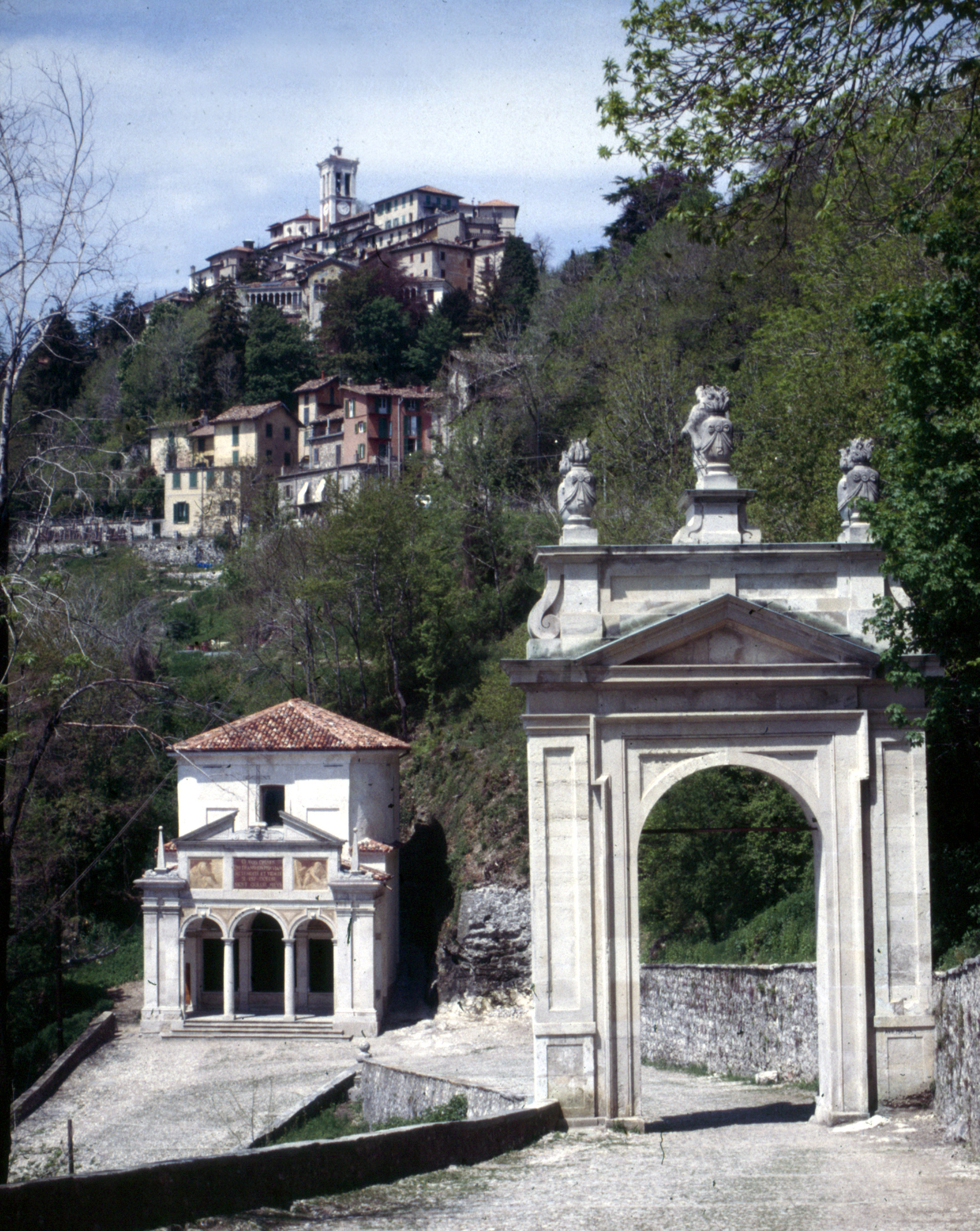
Sacro Monte di Varese

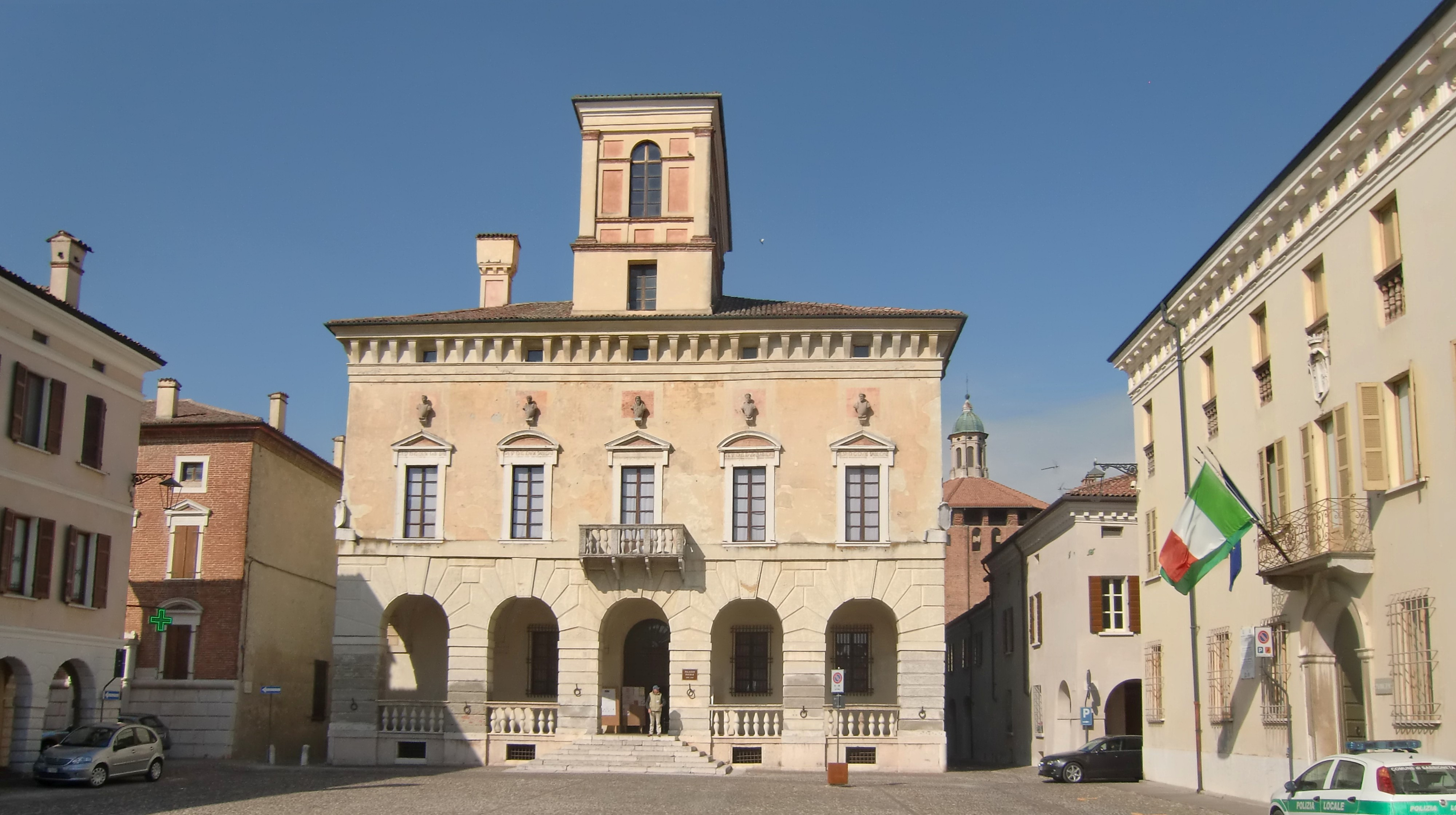
Sabbioneta, a town and comune in the province of Mantua

There are ten UNESCO World Heritage sites wholly or partially located in Lombardy. Some of these comprise several individual objects in different locations. One of the entries has been listed as natural heritage and the others are cultural heritage sites.

At Monte San Giorgio on the border with Swiss canton Ticino just south of Lake Lugano, a wide range of marine Triassic fossils have been found. During the Triassic period, 245–230 million years ago, the area was a shallow tropical lagoon. Fossils include reptiles, fish, crustaceans and insects.

The Rock Drawings in Valcamonica date to between 8000 BC and 1000 BC, covering prehistoric periods from the Epipaleolithic and Mesolithic to the Iron Age, and constitute the largest collections of prehistoric petroglyphs in the world. The collection was recognized by UNESCO in 1979 and was Italy's first recognized World Heritage Site. UNESCO has formally recognized more than 140,000 figures and symbols, but new discoveries have increased the number of catalogued incisions to between 200,000 and 300,000. The petroglyphs are spread on all surfaces of the valley, but concentrated in the areas of Darfo Boario Terme, Capo di Ponte, Nadro, Cimbergo and Paspardo.

Prehistoric pile dwellings around the Alps are a series of prehistoric pile dwelling (or stilt house) settlements in and around the Alps built from about 5000 to 500 BC on the edges of lakes, rivers or wetlands. In 2011, 111 sites located variously in Switzerland (56), Italy (19), Germany (18), France (11), Austria (5) and Slovenia (2) were added to the UNESCO World Heritage Site list. In Slovenia, these were the first World Heritage Sites to be listed for their cultural value. Excavations conducted at some of the sites have yielded evidence regarding prehistoric life and the way communities interacted with their environment during the Neolithic and Bronze Ages in Alpine Europe. These settlements are a unique group of exceptionally well-preserved and culturally rich archaeological sites, which constitute one of the most important sources for the study of early agrarian societies in the region.

Another multi-centred site, Longobards in Italy, Places of Power (568–774 A.D.) consists of seven locations across mainland Italy which illustrate the history of the Lombard period. Two of the sites are in modern-day Lombardy: the fortifications (the castrum and the Torba Tower), and the church of Santa Maria foris portas ("outside the gates") has Byzantinesque frescoes at Castelseprio, and the monastic complex of San Salvatore-Santa Giulia at Brescia. The UNESCO site at Brescia also includes the remains of its Roman forum, the best-preserved in northern Italy.

The Church and Dominican Convent of Santa Maria delle Grazie in Milan with The Last Supper by Leonardo da Vinci represent architectural and painting styles of the 15th-century Renaissance period. The towns Mantua and Sabbioneta are also listed as a combined World Heritage site relating to this period, here focussing more on town-planning aspects of the time than on architectural detail. While Mantua was rebuilt in the 15th and 16th centuries, according to Renaissance principles, Sabbioneta was planned as a new town in the 16th century.

The Sacri Monti of Piedmont and Lombardy are a group of nine sites in northwest Italy, two of which are in Lombardy. The concept of holy mountains can be found elsewhere in Europe. These sites were created as centres of pilgrimage by placing chapels in the natural landscape and were loosely modelled on the topography of Jerusalem. In Lombardy, Sacro Monte del Rosario di Varese and Sacro Monte della Beata Vergine del Soccorso, which were built in the early-to mid-17th century, mark the architectural transition from the late Renaissance to the Baroque style.

Crespi d'Adda is a historic settlement and an outstanding example of the 19th and early 20th-century "company towns" built in Europe and North America by enlightened industrialists to meet the workers' needs. The site is still intact and is partly used for industrial purposes, although changing economic and social conditions now threaten its survival. Since 1995 it has been on UNESCO's list of World Heritage Sites.

Mantua and Sabbioneta represent two approaches of Renaissance period town planning. Mantua (pictured), originating in Roman times and preserving structures from the 11th century, was renovated in the 15th and 16th centuries. On the other hand, Sabbioneta was founded in the second half of the 16th century by Vespasiano I Gonzaga and built with a grid plan, according to the period's vision of an ideal city.

The Rhaetian Railway in the Albula/Bernina Landscapes is mostly located in the Swiss canton Grisons, but extends over the border into Tirano. The site is listed because of the complex railway engineering (tunnels, viaducts and avalanche galleries) necessary to take the narrow-gauge railway across the main chain of the Alps. The two railway lines were opened in several stages between 1904 and 1910.

The Venetian Works of Defence between the 16th and 17th centuries: Stato da Terra – western Stato da Mar is a transnational system of fortifications that were built by the Republic of Venice on its mainland domains (Stato da Terra) and its territories stretching along the Adriatic coast (Stato da Mar). This site includes the fortified city Bergamo.

=== Traditions and folklore ===
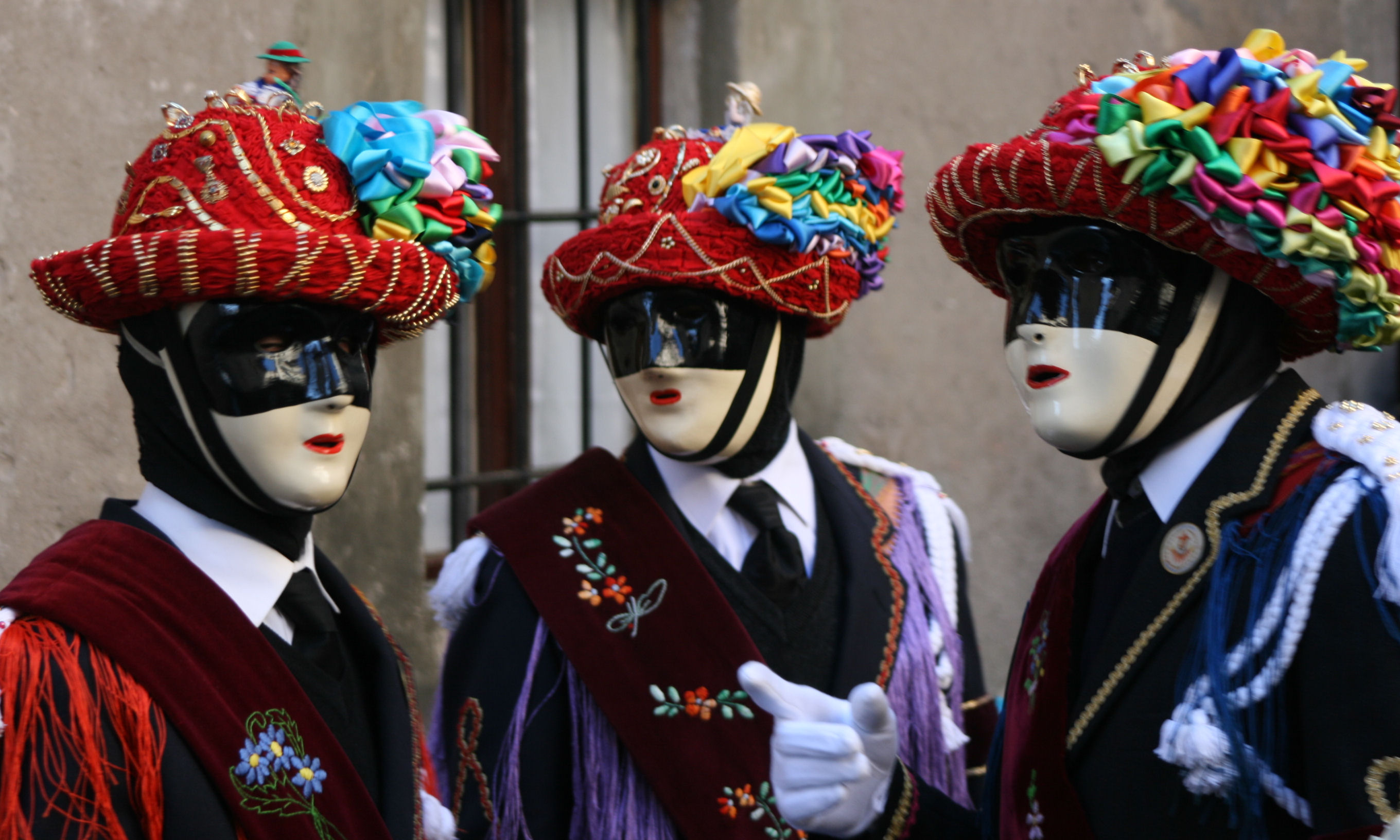
Typical masks of the Bagolino Carnival, in the province of Brescia

There are numerous traditional festivals and meetings in Lombardy: cities and towns offer calendars full of events, some of which have ancient origins.

The Oh bej! Oh bej! is held in Milan on 7 and 8 December each year and commemorates the appointment of Saint Ambrose as bishop of the city.

The Ambrosian Carnival (Italian: Carnevale Ambrosiano) is celebrated in the Roman Catholic Archdiocese of Milan and in the territories of some of the neighbouring dioceses. It lasts until the first Saturday of Lent.

The Bagolino Carnival (Italian: Carnevale di Bagolino), of very ancient tradition, is celebrated in Bagolino, an ancient village that retains its medieval architectural characteristics and located in the Caffaro Valley, in the province of Brescia.

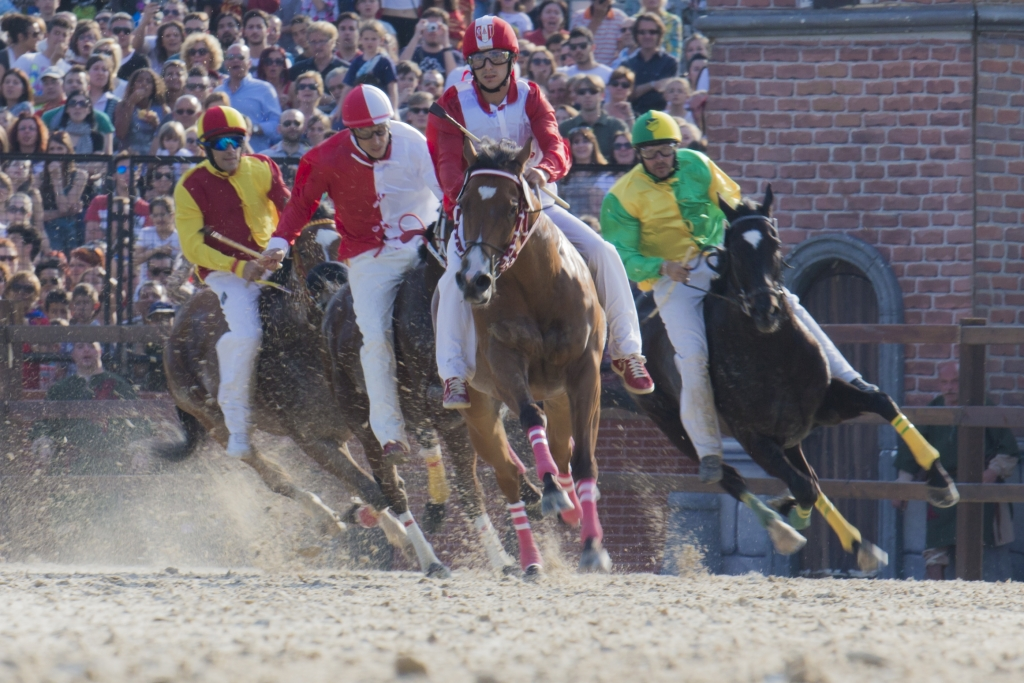
The horse race of the Palio di Legnano 2014

The Palio di Legnano is held in the city of the same name and in the Metropolitan City of Milan, on the last Sunday of May. It is the historical re-enactment which celebrates the victory of the Lombard League over the emperor Frederick Barbarossa in the battle of Legnano on 29 May 1176. The event includes a medieval pageant through the streets of the city and finally a horse race between the eight contrade in which Legnano is divided.

The historical re-enactment of the oath of Pontida is held in Pontida, in the province of Bergamo, on 7 March and commemorates the legendary oath of the Lombard League which should have been the prelude to the victorious war of the Lombard municipalities against Barbarossa.

== Sport ==
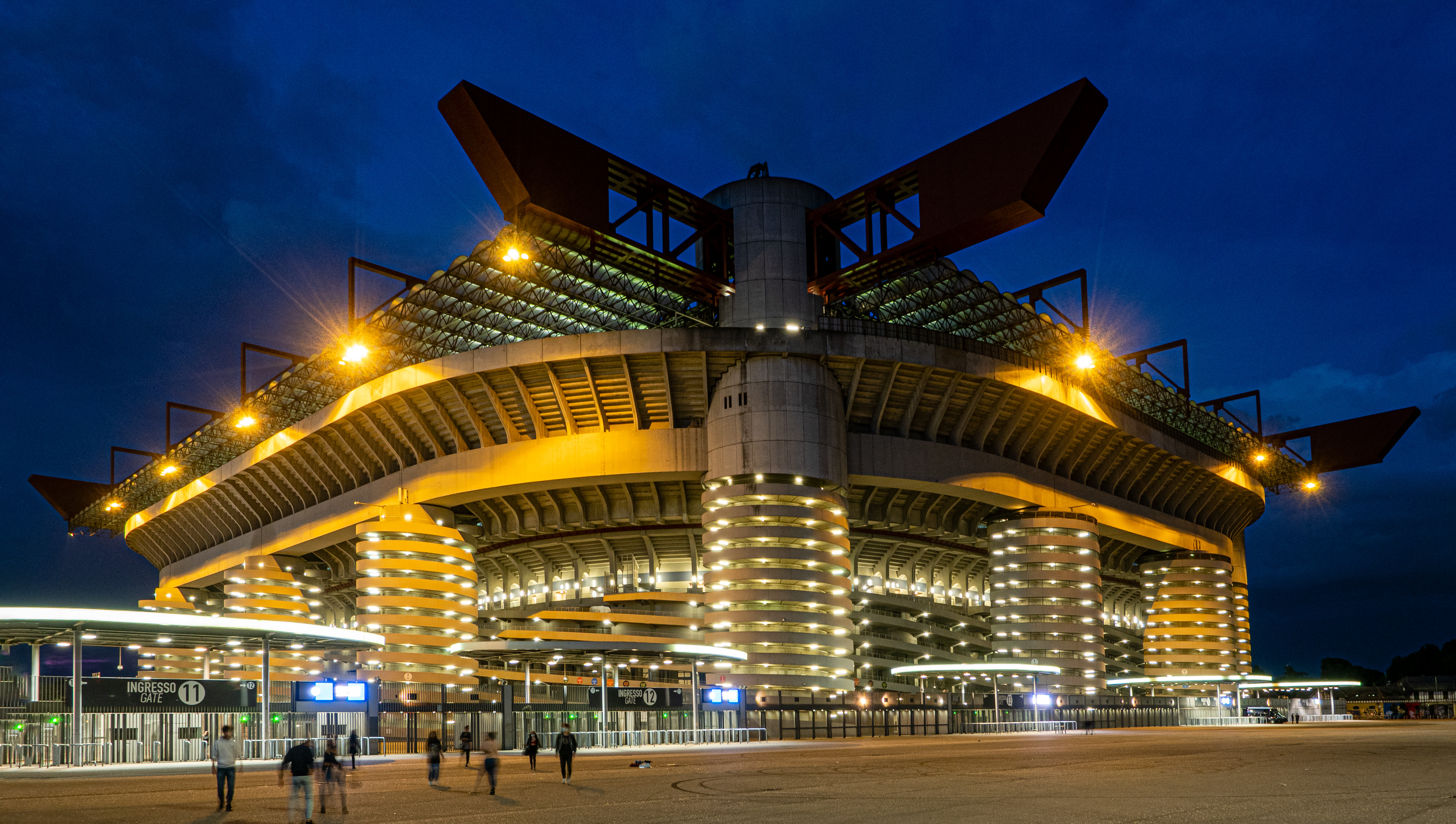
San Siro Stadium, home of AC Milan and Inter Milan, has a capacity of 80,000. It is Italy's biggest stadium.

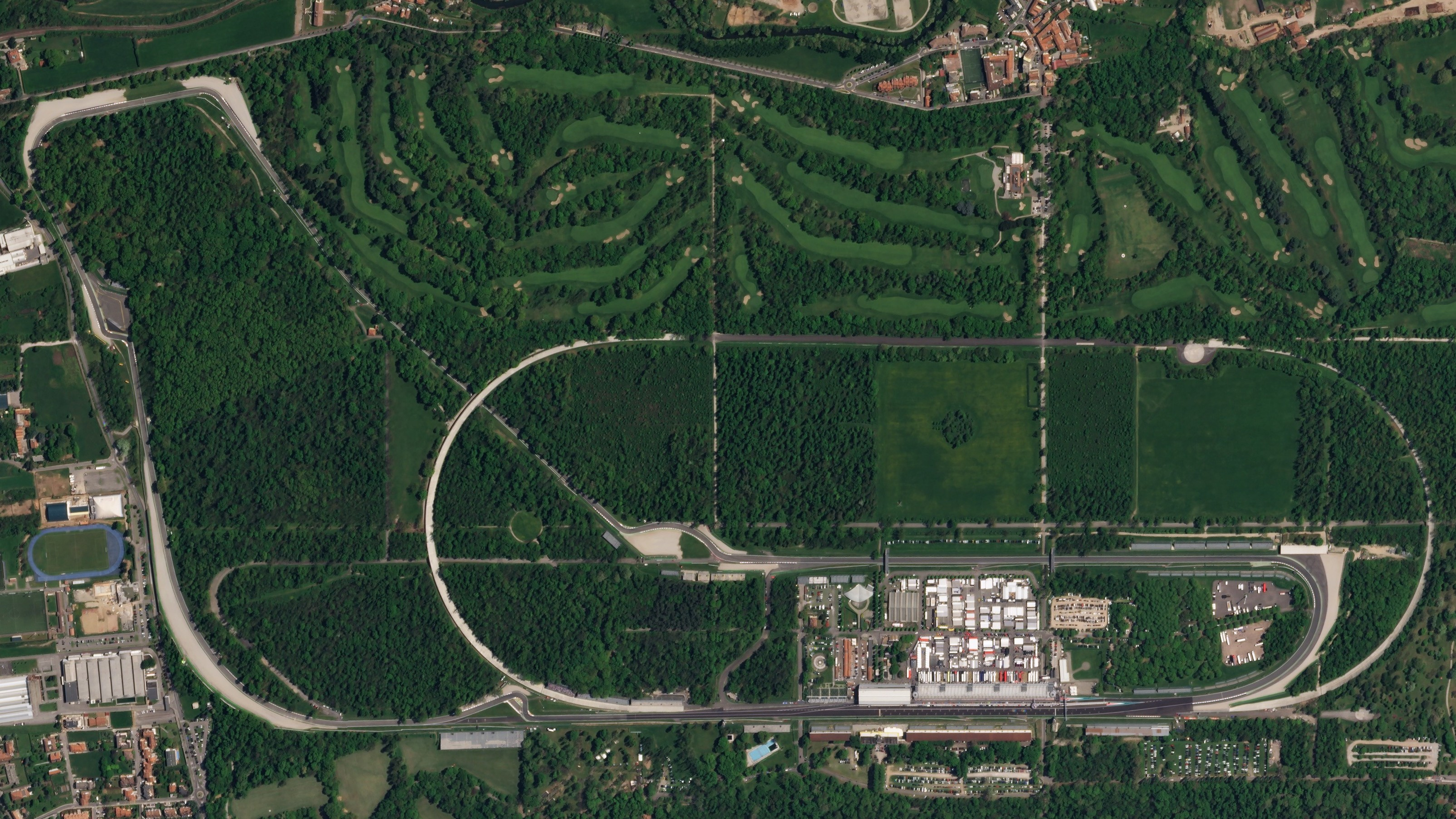
Satellite view of the Monza Circuit

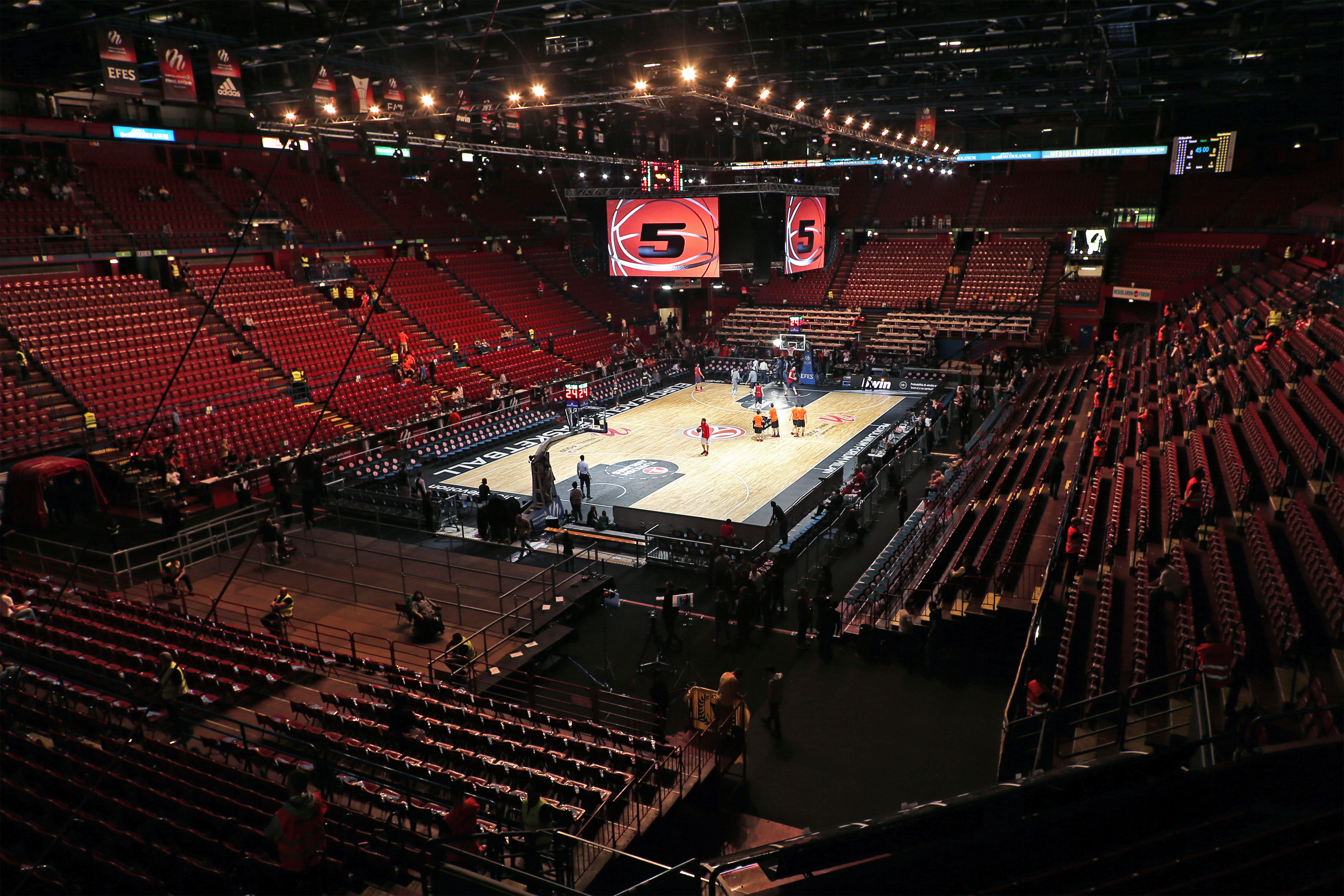
Mediolanum Forum, home of Olimpia Milano

The most popular sport in Lombardy is football. Lombardy has some of the most-successful men's football teams in the country. In the 2023–2024 Serie A season, Lombardy hosts 4 out of 20 teams: A.C. Milan and Inter Milan (both based in Milan) and Atalanta (based in Bergamo); Monza. Other big teams of the region are Brescia, Como, Lecco, Feralpisalò and Cremonese playing in the 2023–2024 Serie B; AlbinoLeffe, Pro Patria, A.C. Renate, Lumezzane, Giana Erminio, Pro Sesto and Pergolettese playing in the 2023–2024 Serie C.

Milan, along with Manchester, is one of only two cities in Europe that is home to two European Cup/Champions League winning teams: Serie A football clubs AC Milan and Inter. They are two of the most successful clubs in the world of football in terms of international trophies. Both teams have also won the FIFA Club World Cup (formerly the Intercontinental Cup). With a combined ten Champions League titles, Milan is only second to Madrid as the city with the most European Cups. Both teams play at the UEFA 5-star-rated Giuseppe Meazza Stadium, more commonly known as the San Siro, that is one of the biggest stadiums in Europe, with a seating capacity of over 80,000. The Meazza Stadium has hosted four European Cup/Champions League finals, most recently in 2016, when Real Madrid defeated Atlético Madrid 5–3 in a penalty shoot-out.

Olimpia Milano (based in Milan) is the most successful men's basketball team in Italy. In the 2023-24 LBA season 4 teams out of 16 are from Lombardy (Olimpia Milano, Pallacanestro Brescia, Pallacanestro Varese, Guerino Vanoli Basket). Olimpia Milano have won 27 Italian League championships, six Italian National Cups, one Italian Super Cup, three European Champions Cups, one FIBA Intercontinental Cup, three FIBA Saporta Cups, two FIBA Korać Cups and many junior titles. The team play at the Mediolanum Forum, with a capacity of 12,700, where it has been hosted the final of the 2013–14 Euroleague. In some cases, the team also plays at the PalaDesio, with a capacity of 6,700.

Milan is also home to Italy's oldest American football team: Rhinos Milano, who have won five Italian Super Bowls. The team plays at the Velodromo Vigorelli, with a capacity of 8,000. Another American football team that uses the same venue is the Seamen Milano, who will join the professional European League of Football in 2023. Bergamo Lions have won Italian Super Bowls more than any other team 12 times. They won the Eurobowl in 2000, 2001 and 2002, while losing to the Vienna Vikings in the finals of 2004 and 2005 Eurobowl. Legnano Frogs were European Football League champions in 1989 (with two participations in the Eurobowl final) and won six Italian Football League titles (with 11 participations in the Italian Super Bowl).

Milan hosted the Winter Olympics and Paralympics for the first time in 2026, alongside Cortina d'Ampezzo of the Veneto region. The Giro d'Italia, a famous annual bicycle race, usually ends in Milan. Amatori Rugby Milano, the most decorated rugby team in Italy, was founded in Milan in 1927. Alpine skiing is also important for the region; the FIS Alpine Ski World Cup holds an annual race in Bormio. The Monza Circuit, located near Milan, hosts the Formula One Italian Grand Prix. The circuit is located inside the Royal Villa of Monza park. It is one of the world's oldest car racing circuits. The capacity for the Formula One races is currently over 113,000. It has hosted a Formula One race nearly every year since the first year of competition, with the exception of 1980.

== Economy ==
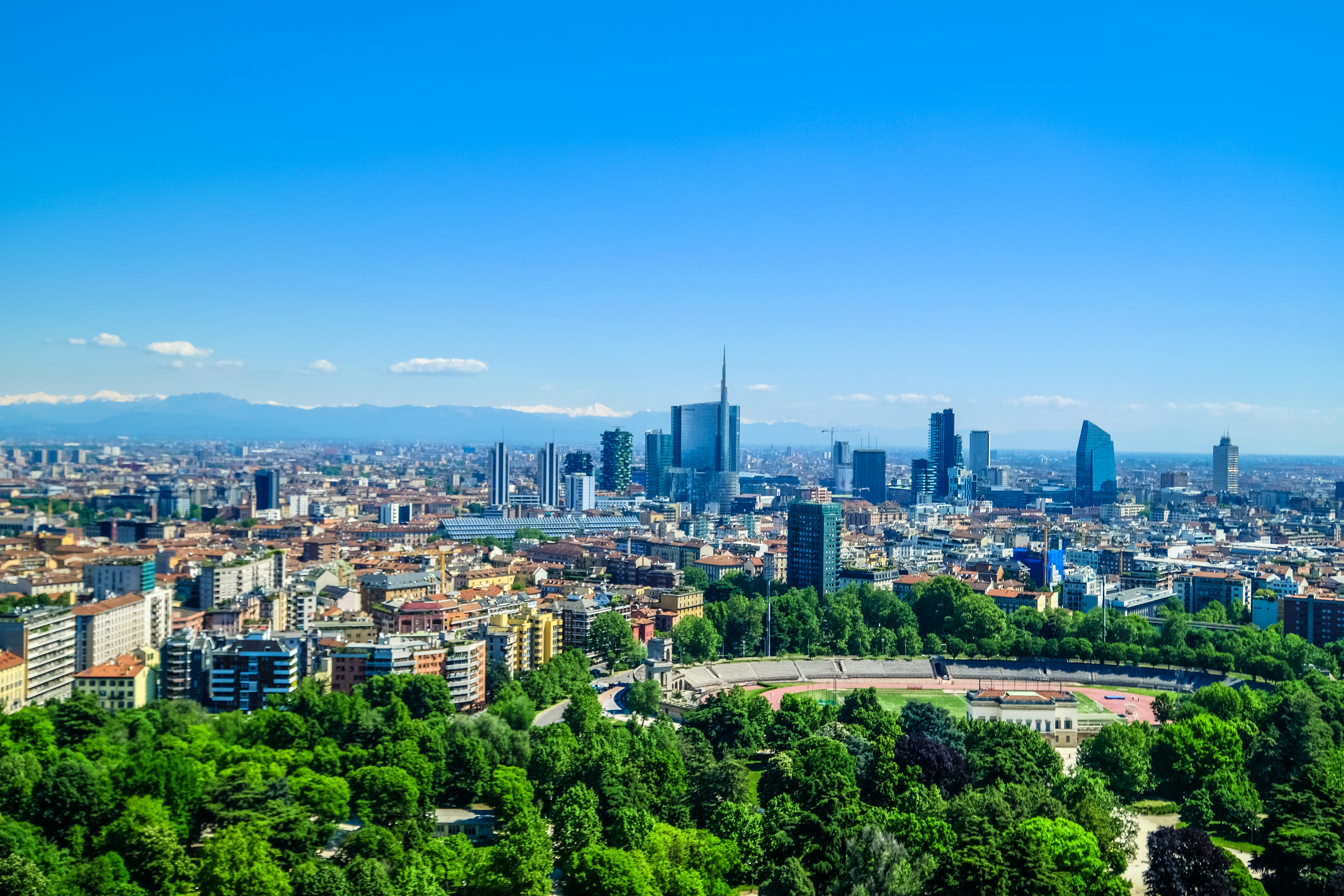
Milan is the economic capital of Italy, and is a global economic-financial centre and a fashion capital of the world.

Lombardy is the first region of Italy in terms of economic importance. As of 2021, the gross regional product (GRP) of Lombardy was equal to over €366 billion and accounted for about 22% of Italy's total GDP. Lombardy's 2021 GRP was €36,500 per person, more than 25% higher than the national average of €25,729. Lombardy is the second region of the European Union by nominal GDP.

Lombardy's services sector has grown since the 1980s, led by innovative activities in business services, credit and financial services. Lombardy also remains the main industrial area of Italy. Milan, its capital, is the economic capital of Italy, is a global financial and business centre and is widely regarded as a global capital in industrial design, fashion and architecture.

Lombardy has cultural and economic relationships with many foreign countries including Azerbaijan, Austria, France, Hungary, Switzerland (especially the cantons of Ticino and Grisons), Canada (the Province of Quebec), Germany (the States of Bavaria, Saxony, and Saxony-Anhalt), Kuwait, the Netherlands (Province of Zuid-Holland), and Russia.

GDP and GDP per capita in Lombardy (2000–2018)
| | 2000 | 2001 | 2002 | 2003 | 2004 | 2005 | 2006 | 2007 | 2008 | 2009 | 2010 | 2011 | 2012 | 2013 | 2014 | 2015 | 2016 | 2017 | 2018 |
|---|---|---|---|---|---|---|---|---|---|---|---|---|---|---|---|---|---|---|---|
| GDP (Euro) | 247.052 | 259.431 | 270.653 | 279.450 | 289.471 | 297.600 | 307.718 | 320.844 | 323.973 | 310.952 | 346.797 | 354.342 | 348.665 | 349.008 | 350.025 | 357.200 | 375.270 | 385.133 | 390.461 |
| GDP per capita (Euro) | 27.488 | 28.766 | 29.837 | 30.449 | 31.060 | 31.545 | 32.356 | 33.443 | 33.425 | 31.743 | 35.713 | 36.220 | 35.367 | 35.127 | 35.044 | 35.700 | 37.474 | 38.407 | 38.858 |

The Four Motors for Europe (in light blue) compared to the European Union: Lombardy, Baden-Württemberg in Germany, Catalonia in Spain, and Auvergne-Rhône-Alpes in France

Lombardy is a member of the Four Motors for Europe, an international economical organization whose other members are Baden-Württemberg in Germany, Catalonia in Spain, and Auvergne-Rhône-Alpes in France. The Lombardy region is also part of the EUSALP, which promotes innovation, sustainability, and economy in the Alpine regions of Austria, France, Liechtenstein, Northern Italy, Southern Germany, Switzerland, and Slovenia, and ARGE ALP, an economic forum of alpine regions of Austria, Northern Italy, Southern Germany, and Switzerland. Economical and cultural relationship are also strong with neighbouring Italian regions Friuli-Venezia Giulia, South Tyrol, Trentino, and Veneto.

Furthermore, Lombardy is part of the economic heart of Europe and of the so-called Blue Banana. Milan is, together with London, Hamburg, Frankfurt, Munich and Paris, one of the six European economic capitals. The European Union has developed the Central Europe program in 2014–2020 to foster cooperation between Lombardy and other northern Italian regions and several countries in central Europe.

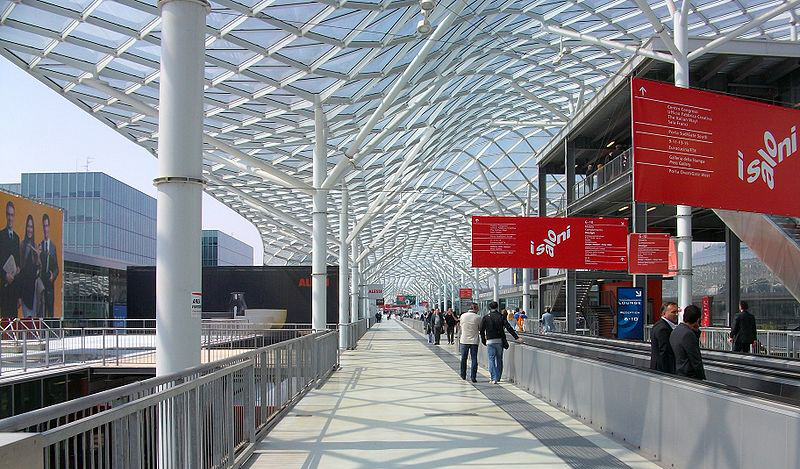
Fiera Milano, the most important trade fair organiser in Italy and the world's fourth largest

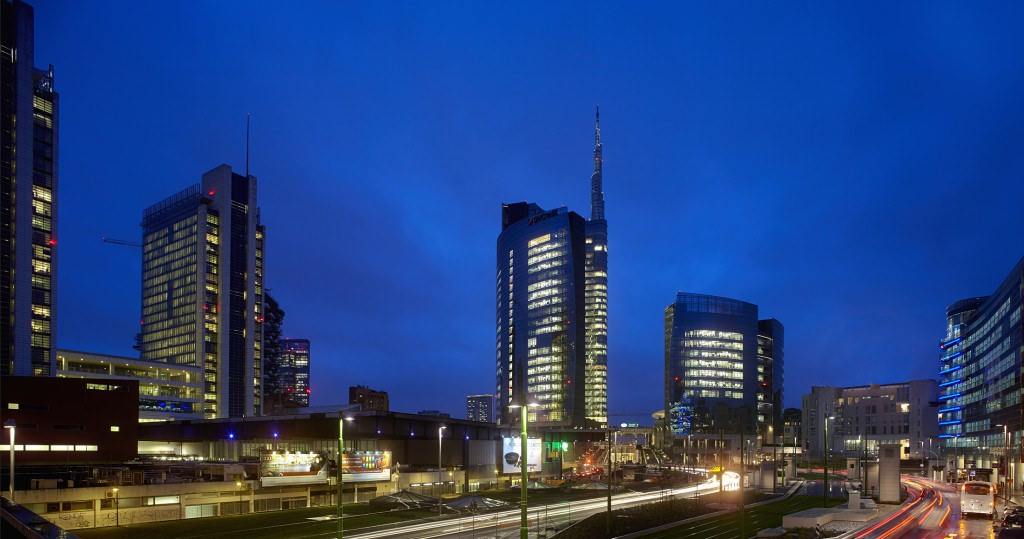
The skyscrapers of Porta Nuova business district in Milan

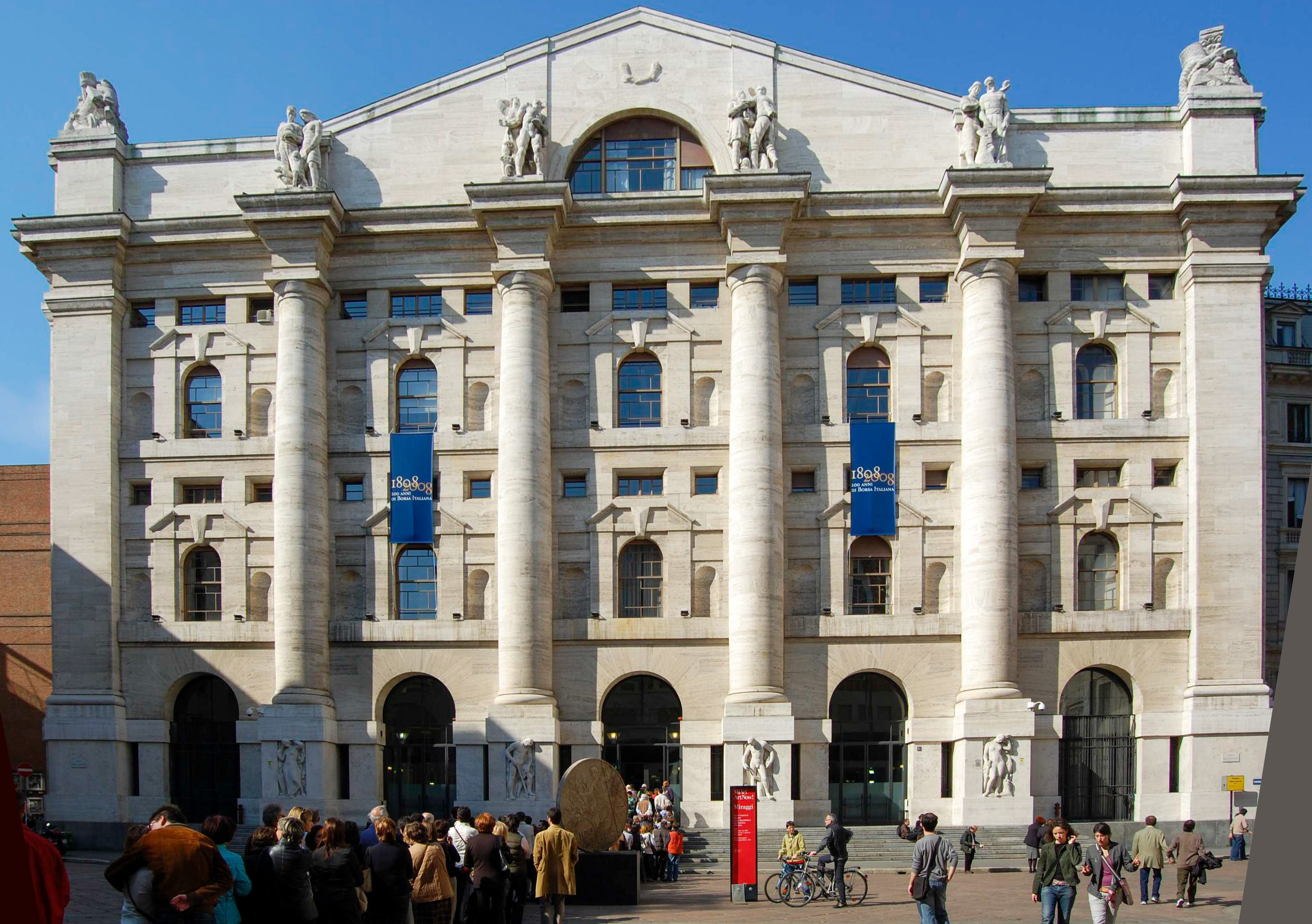
Palazzo Mezzanotte in Milan, the seat of the Italian stock exchange

The region can be broadly divided into three economic areas: Milan, where the services sector comprises 65.3% of employment; the provinces of Varese, Como, Lecco, Monza and Brianza, Bergamo and Brescia, the latter having the highest value added in industry in Europe, where there is a highly industrialised economy and a rich agricultural sector; and the provinces of Sondrio, Pavia, Cremona, Mantua and Lodi, where there is consistent agricultural activity and an above-average development of the services sector.

In the tertiary sector, the weight of trade and finance is significant. The Italian Stock Exchange is based in Milan, one of the main European financial centres. In the early 21st century, two new business districts, Porta Nuova and CityLife, were built in Milan in the space of a decade, radically changing the skyline of the city. Banking, transport, communication and business services activities are also important. Milan is also a global hub for event management and trade fairs. Fiera Milano operates the most important trade fair organiser in Italy and the world's fourth largest exhibition hall in Rho, were international exhibitions like Milan Furniture Fair, EICMA, EMO take place on 400,000 square metres of exhibition areas with more than 4 million visitors in 2018. Milan hosted the Universal Exposition in 1906 and 2015.

=== Agriculture ===
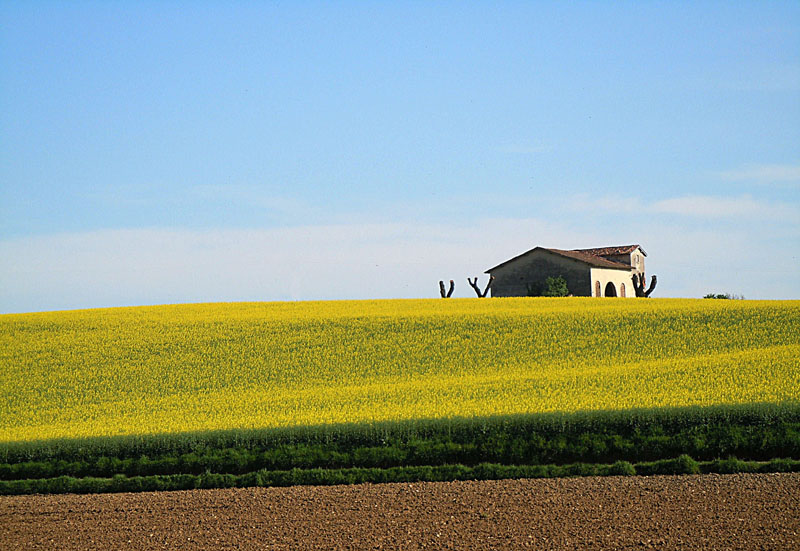
Cultivated fields in Upper Mantua

The productivity of agriculture is enhanced by the use of fertilisers and the traditional abundance of water, which has been boosted since the Middle Ages by the construction of irrigation systems that were partly designed by Leonardo da Vinci. Lower plains are used for fodder crops, cereals (rice, wheat and maize) and sugar beet. Lombardy is one of the main European regions for rice production and together with Piedmont, produces 93% of Italian rice. Cultivation is concentrated in the provinces of Pavia (84,000 ha (210,000 acres), Milan (14,000 ha (35,000 acres)), Lodi 2,000 ha (4,900 acres) and Mantua (1,200 ha (3,000 acres)). Produce of the higher plains includes cereals, vegetables, fruit trees and mulberries. Fruits and wine are produced in upland areas such as the Prealps and Alps sectors in the north.

Lombardy is a centre of animal breeding, which includes dairy cows (36%) and pigs (50%). The region's dairy industry produces 30% of Italian milk, which is used to produce different types of cheese, totalling about 4,715,130 tonnes, 36% of Italian cheese production.

A variety of cured sausages is produced in Lombardy, like Salame Milano, Salame bergamasco, Salame mantovano, Salame di Varzi, Bastardei, Salam casalin, Salame Brianza, Salame pancettato.

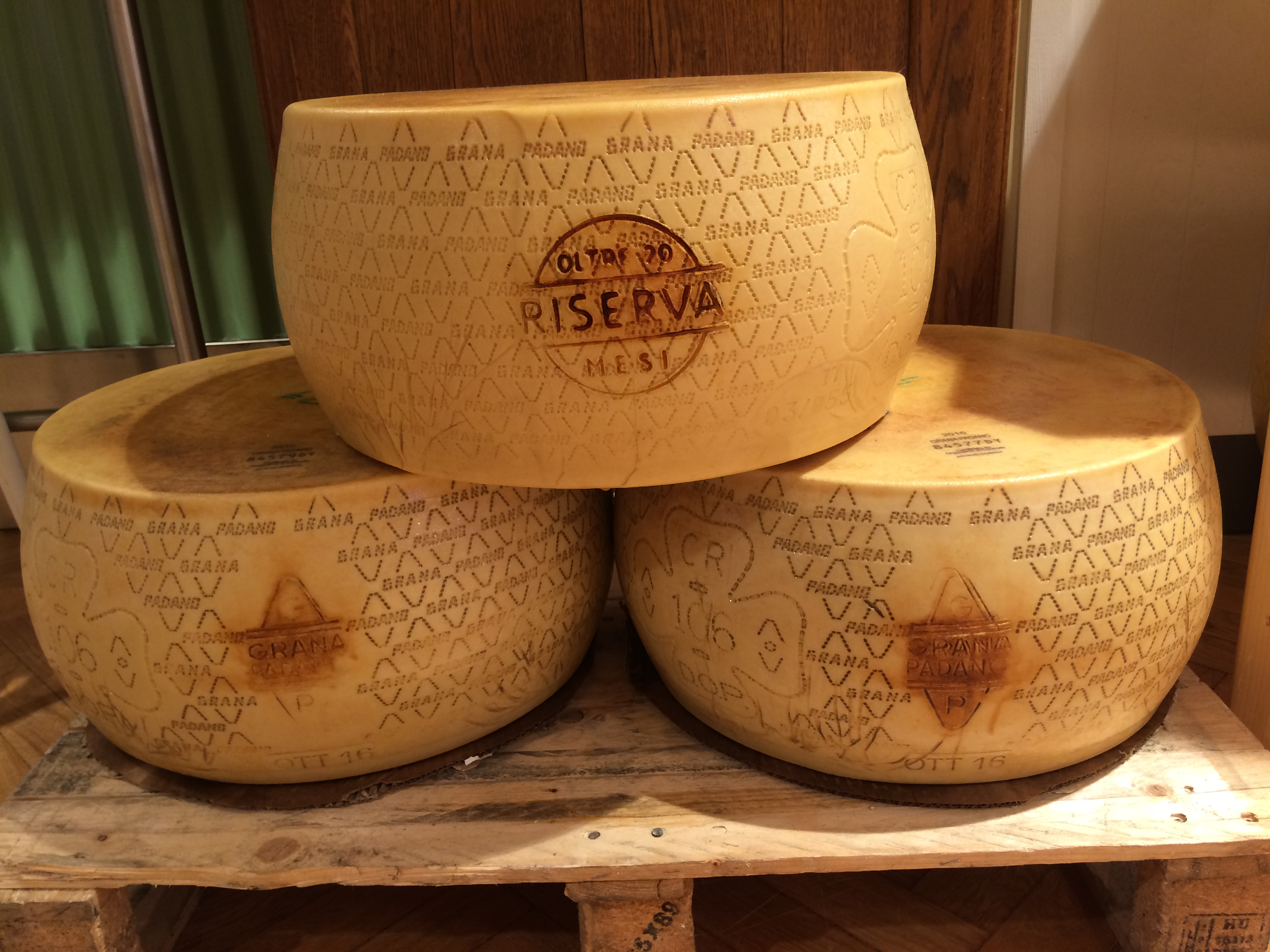
Grana Padano (granular cheese)

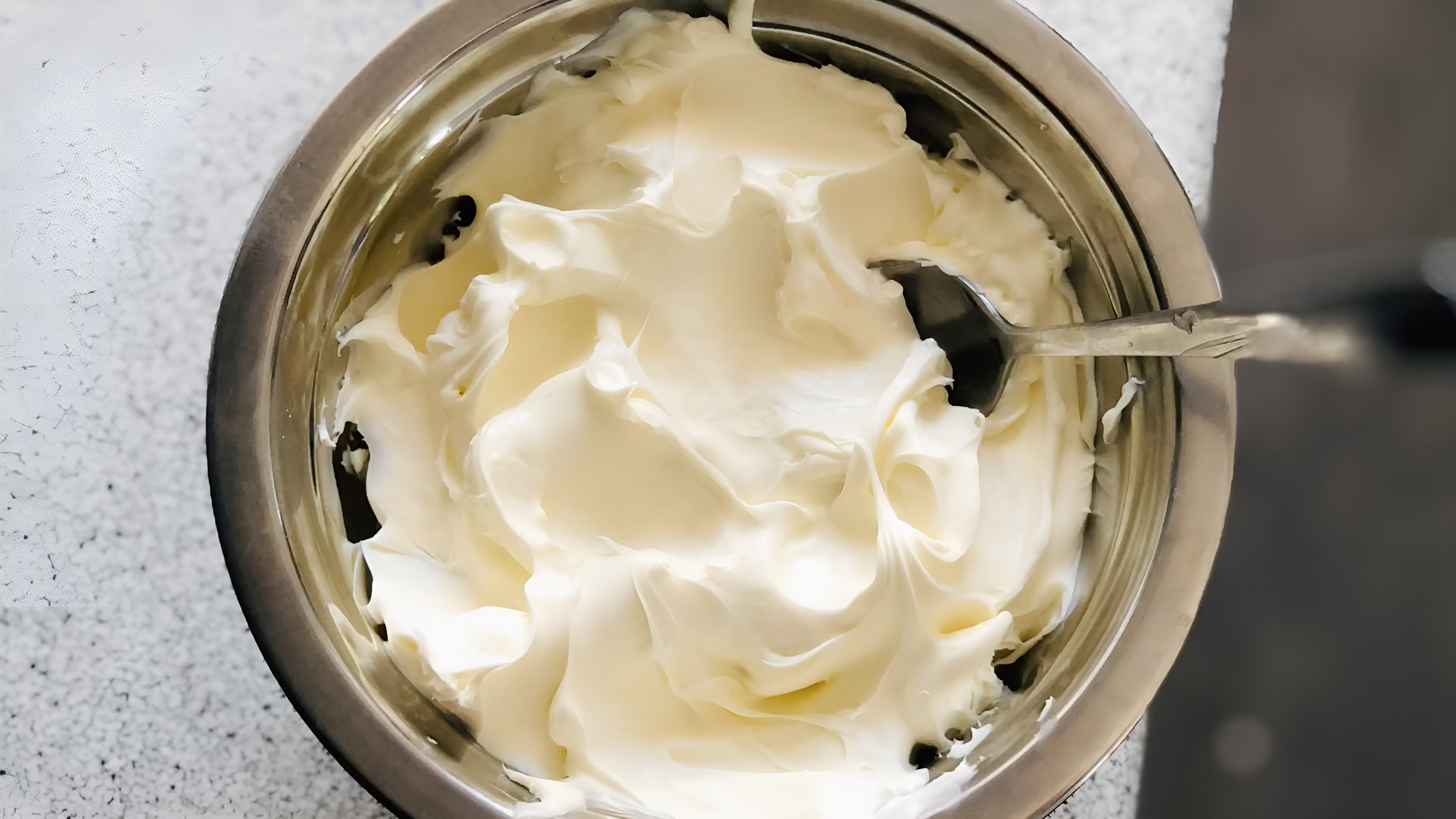
Mascarpone (cream cheese)

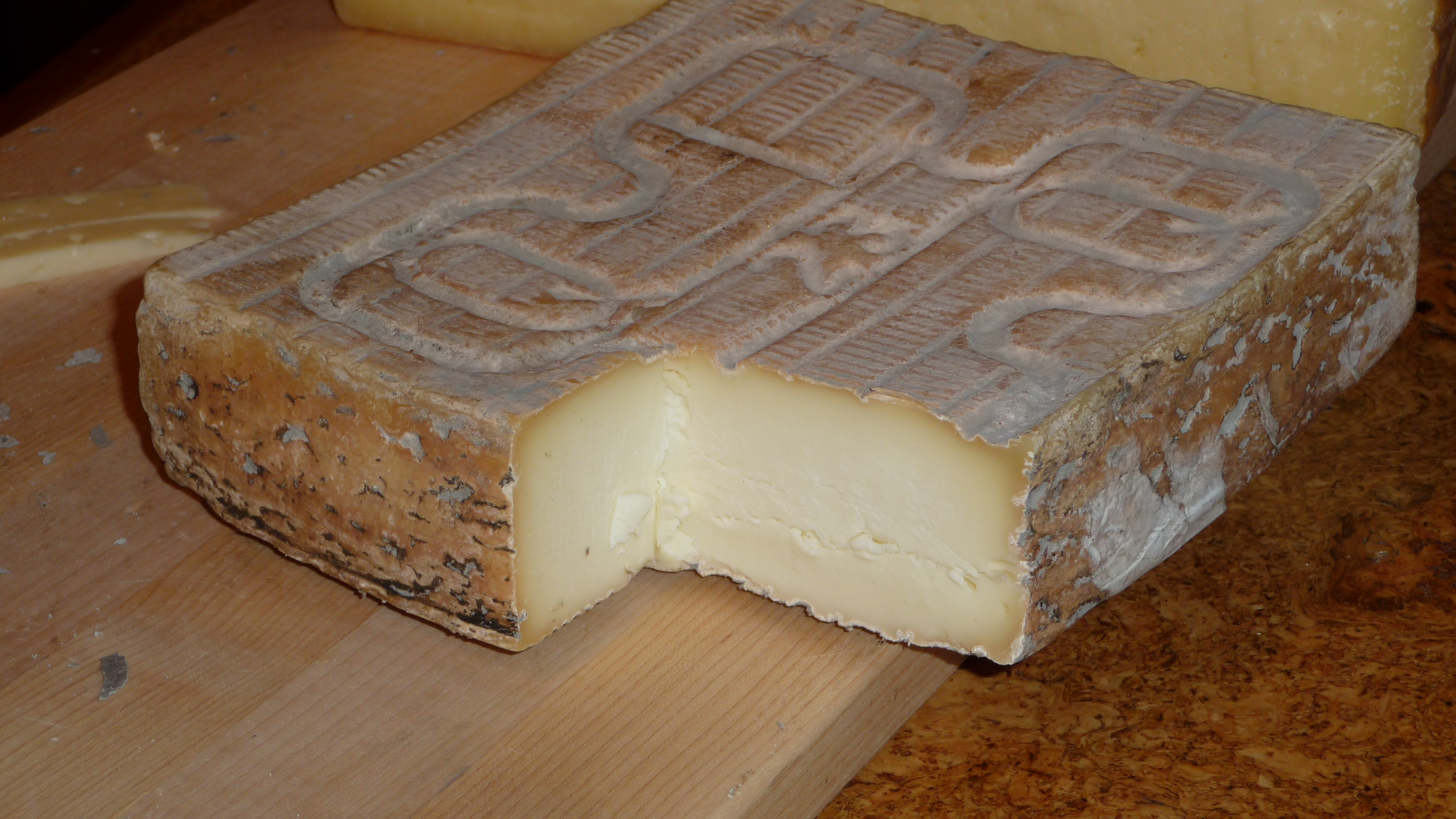
Taleggio (semi-soft cheese)

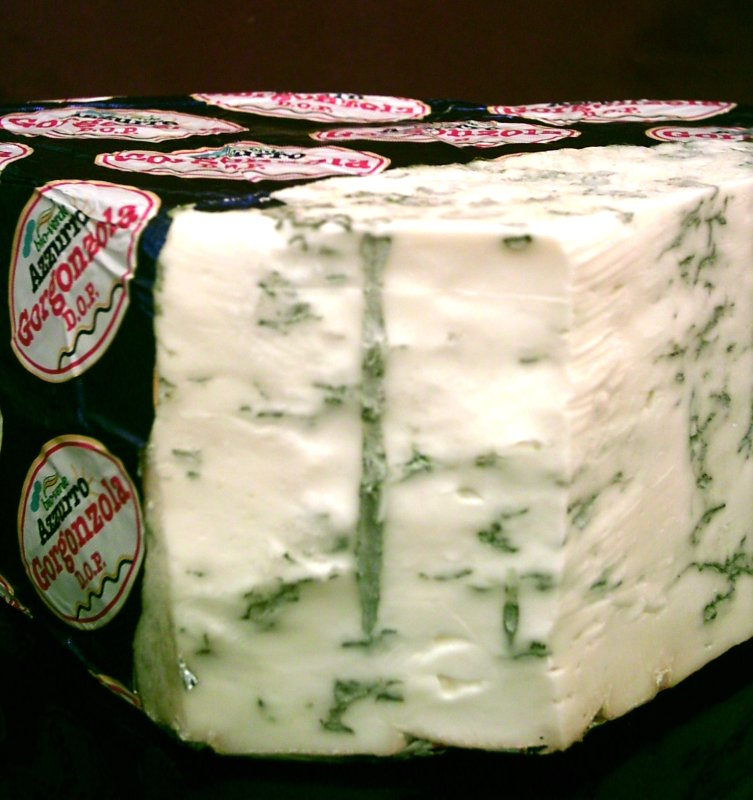
Gorgonzola (blue-veined cheese)

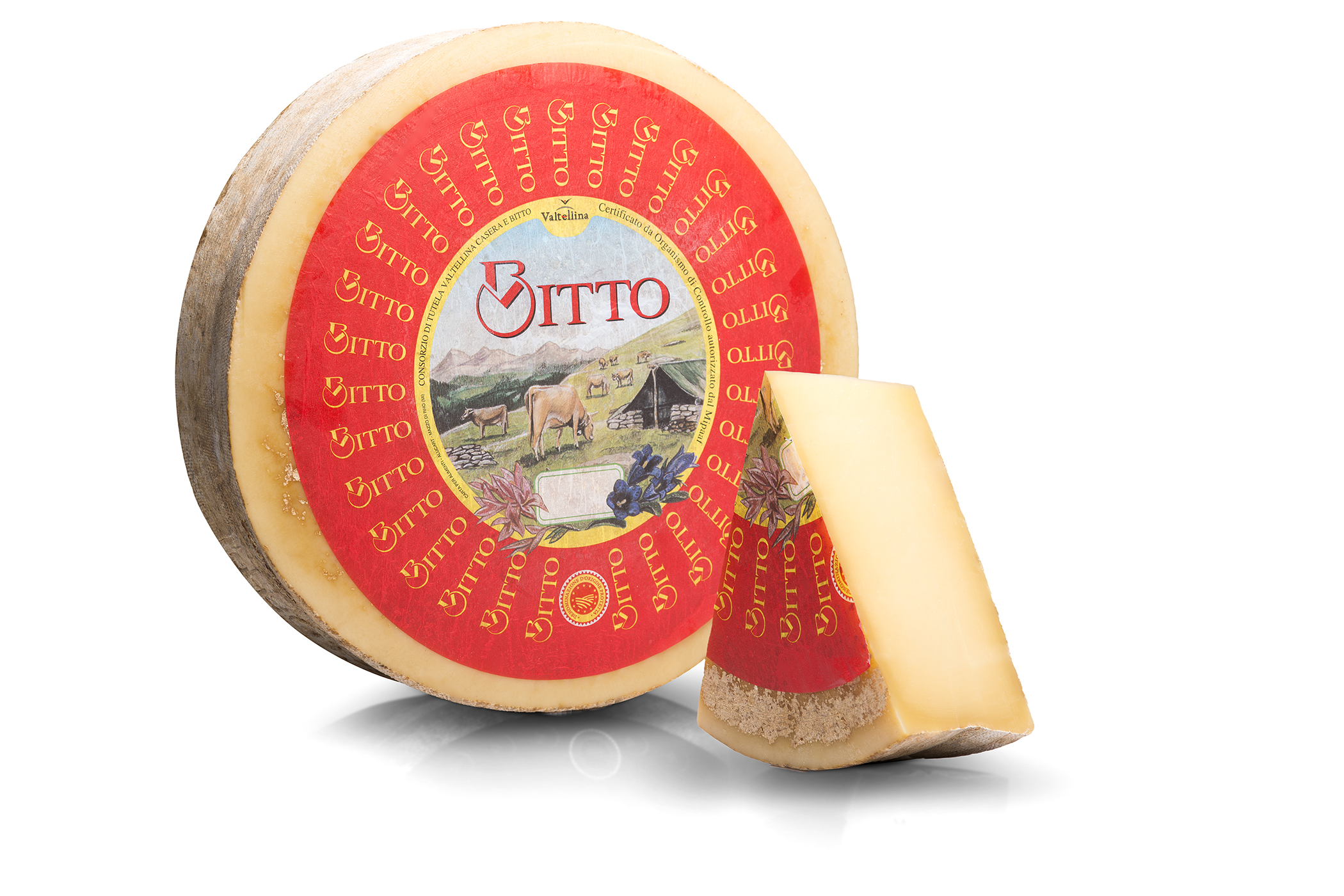
Bitto (hard cheese)

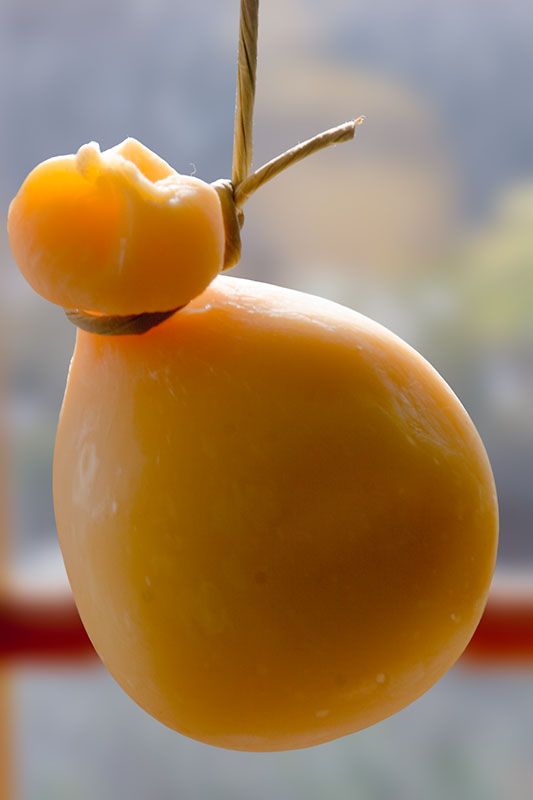
Provolone Valpadana (pasta filata cheese)

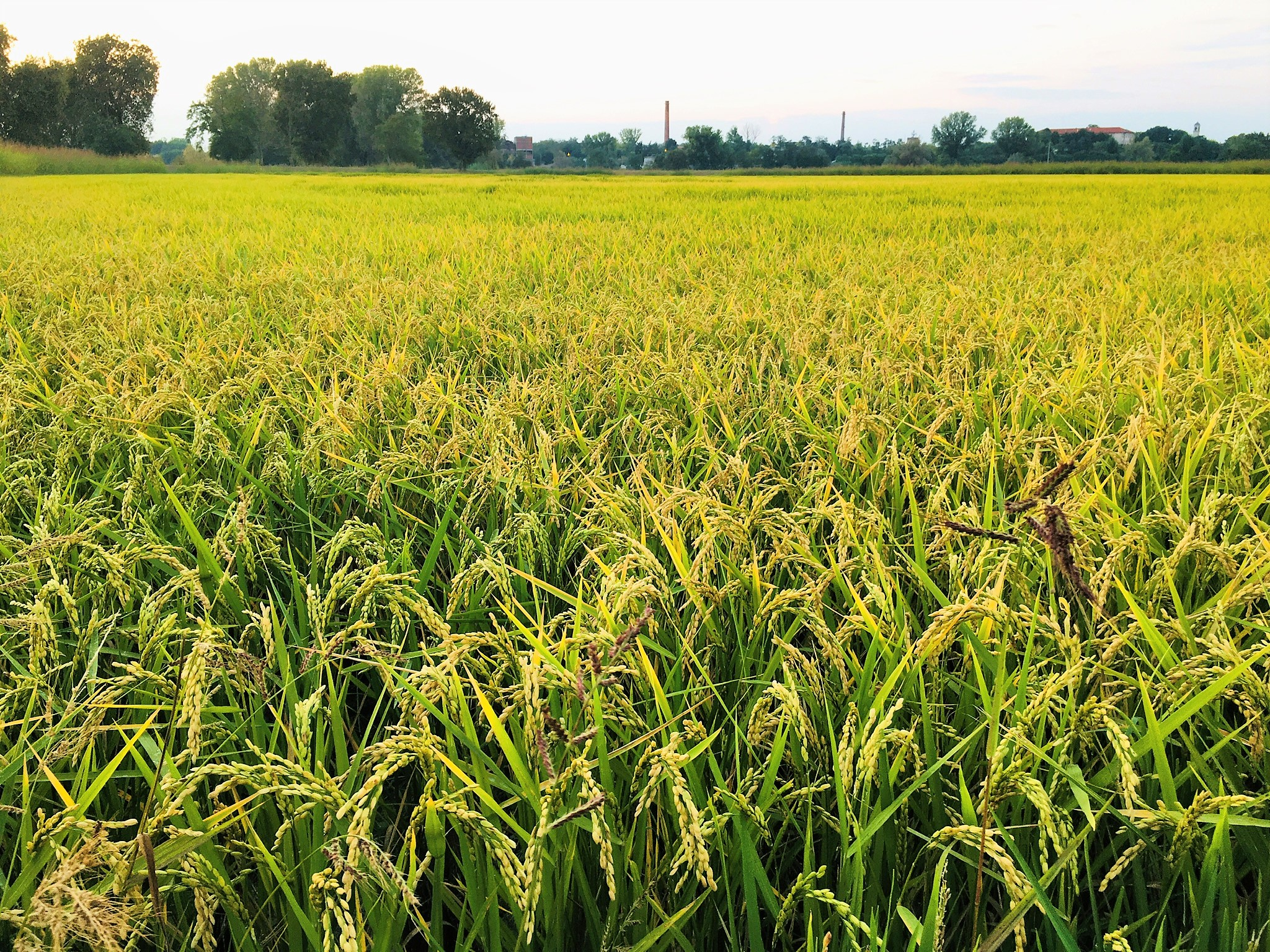
A rice field near Pavia.

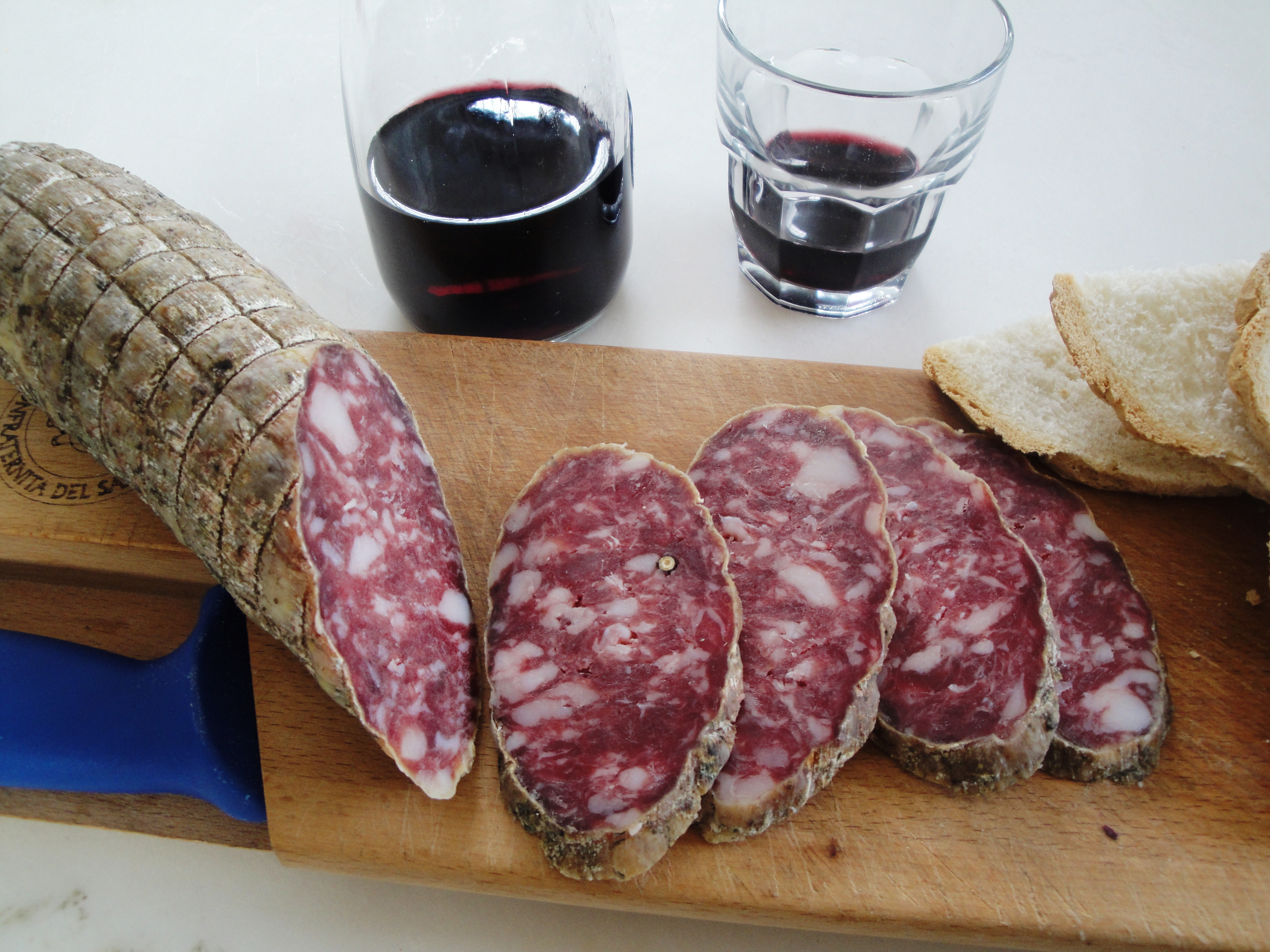
Salame di Varzi

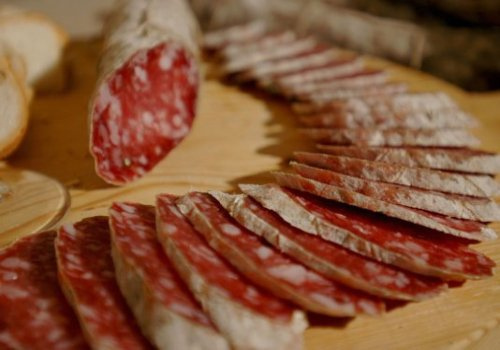
Salame mantovano

Vineyards cover 26,951 ha (66,600 acres). The most important product is the sparkling wines Franciacorta and Oltrepò Pavese, which are produced using the same traditional method as Champagne, unlike other Italian sparkling wines, which use the charmat method. Lombardy ranks 9 of 20 in the production of DOC and DOCG wines with 877,351 hl (19,299,024.00 imp gal; 23,177,161.43 US gal). Lombardy also produces still red, white and rosé wines made from a variety of grapes, including Nebbiolo wines in the Valtellina region and Trebbiano di Lugana white wines produced with the Chiaretto-style rosé along the shores of Lake Garda. The wine region currently has 15 Denominazione di origine controllata (DOC), 3 Denominazione di Origine Controllata e Garantita (DOCG) and 13 Indicazione Geografica Tipica designations. The region annually produces around one point four million hectolitres (30,795,694.76 imp gal; 36,984,087.33 US gal) of wine.

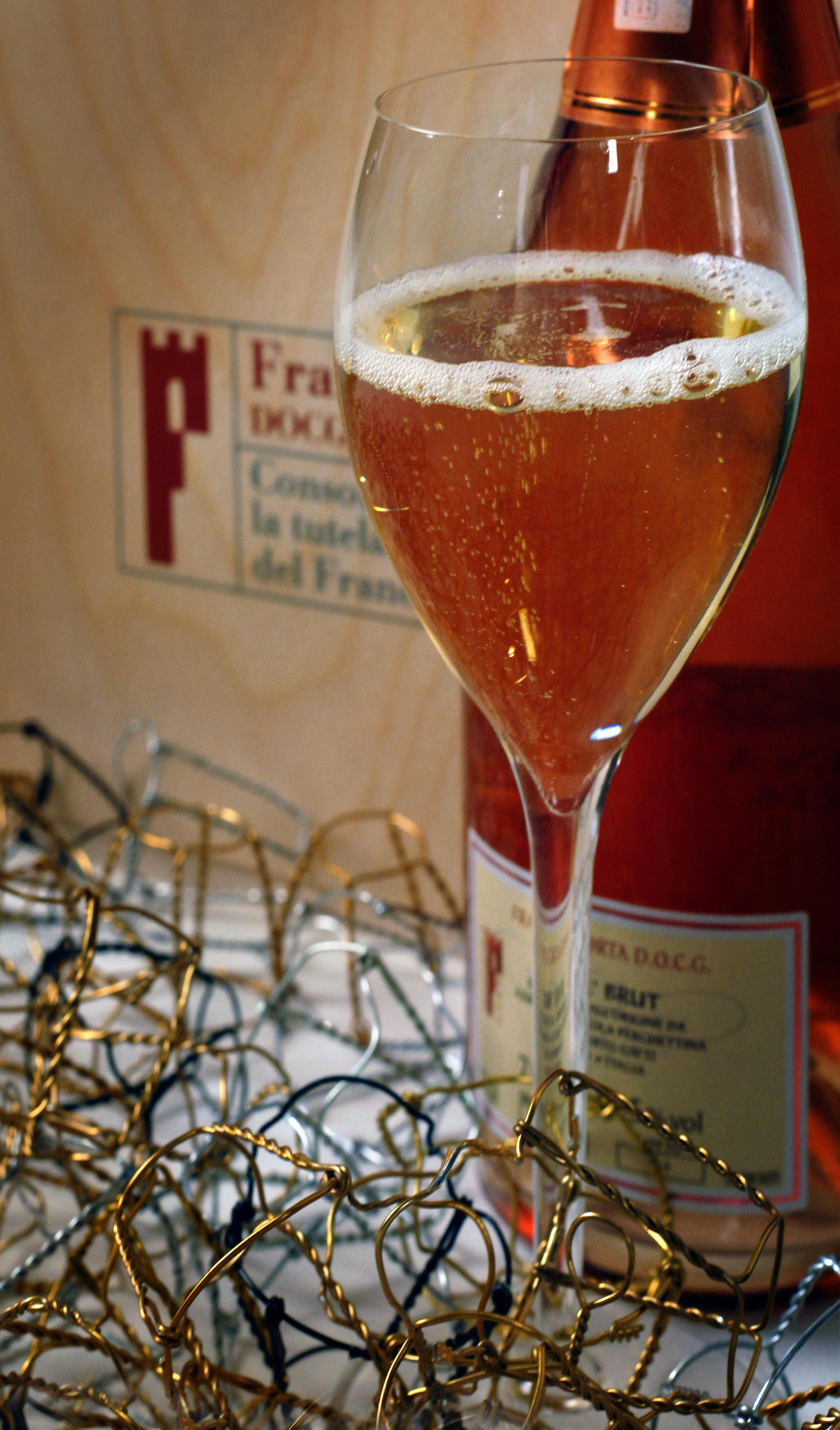
Franciacorta Rose

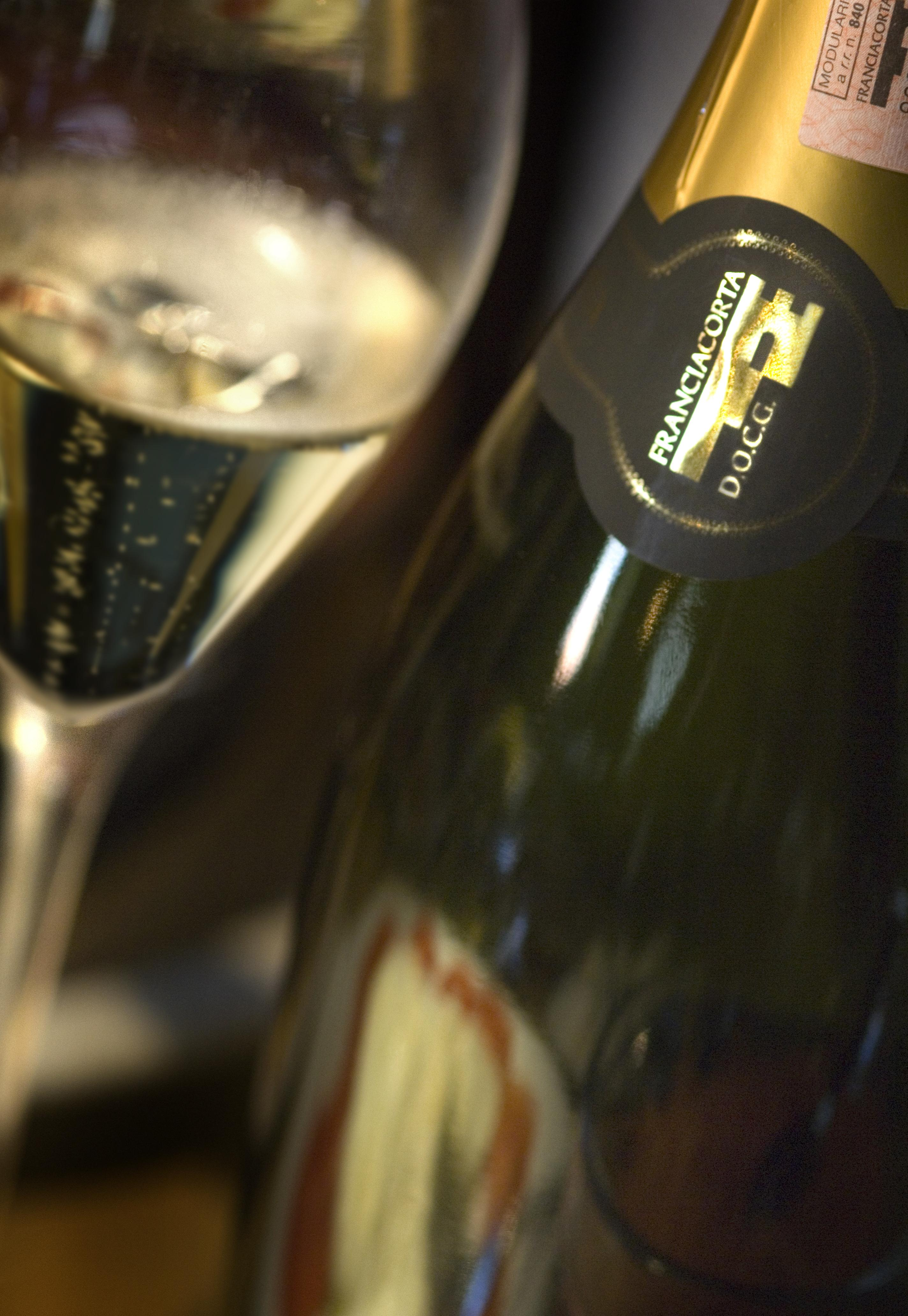
Bottle of Franciacorta

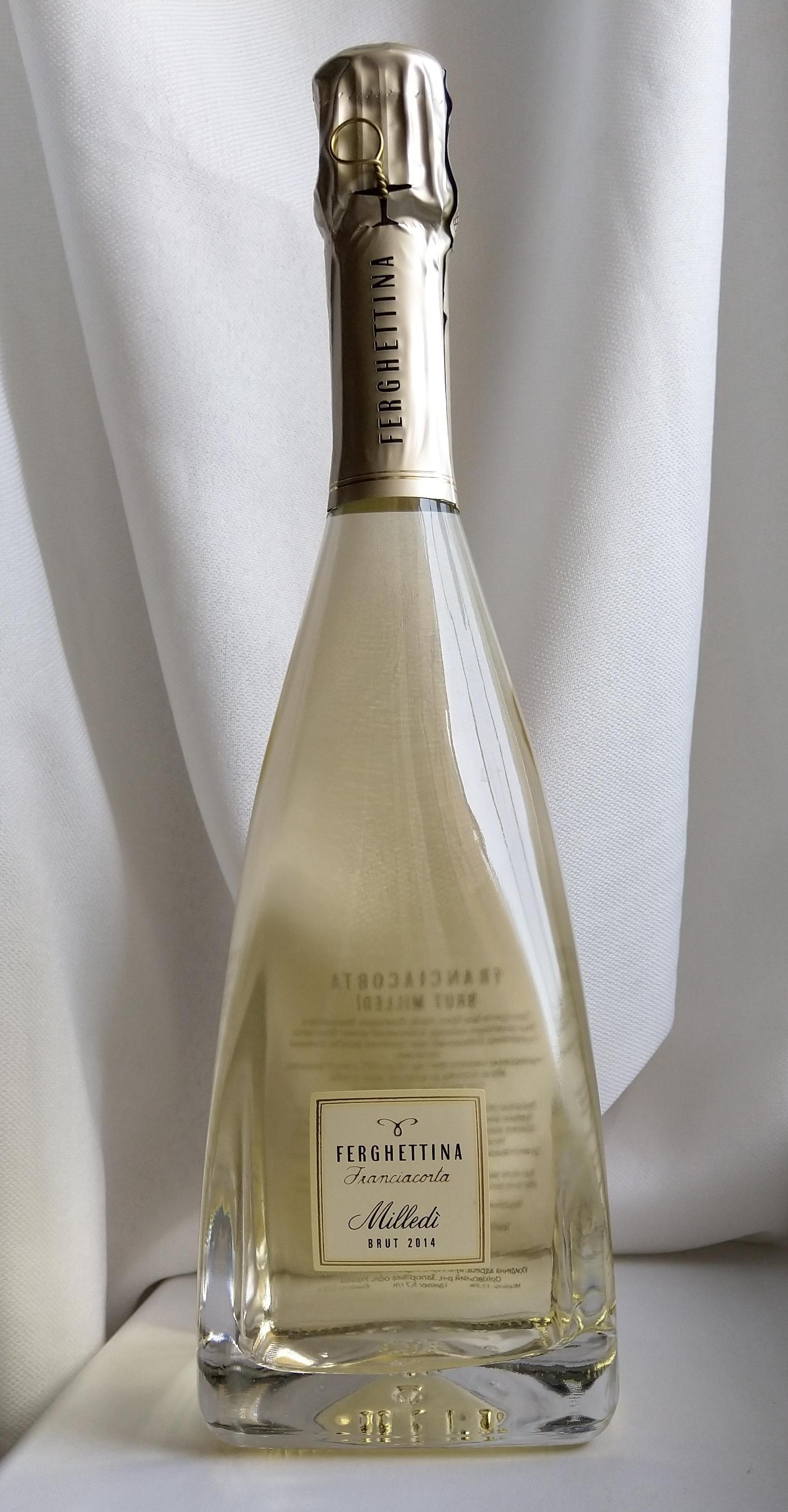
Franciacorta Ferghettina

Brescia is also the main production centre of Italian caviar. The world's largest sturgeon farm is located in Calvisano, about 30 km (19 mi) south of the city centre, producing 25 tonnes of caviar annually, which is exported worldwide. The main activity in Canneto sull'Oglio is the nursery production of broad-leaved plants, for which much land is dedicated.

=== Aerospace and defence ===
Italy is a major exporter of heavy helicopters (over 2,000 kg (4,400 lb)) with a market share of about 30%. The headquarters of Leonardo Helicopters Division (ex-AgustaWestland) is in Lombardy, and is responsible for about a third of the company's orders. The region also has a plant of Leonardo Aircraft Division (ex-Aermacchi). The main helicopter design, production and training facilities are located in Cascina Costa di Samarate, Vergiate and Sesto Calende. The company's aircraft division manufactures military training aircraft in Venegono Superiore.

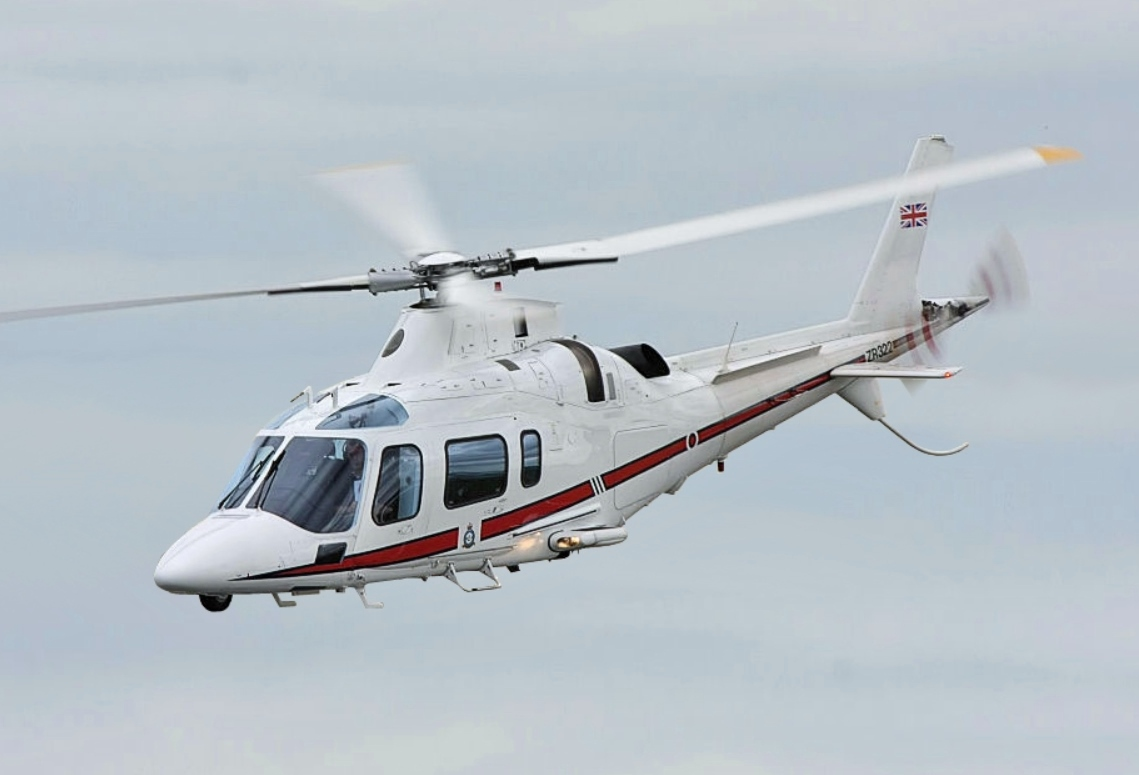
AgustaWestland AW109

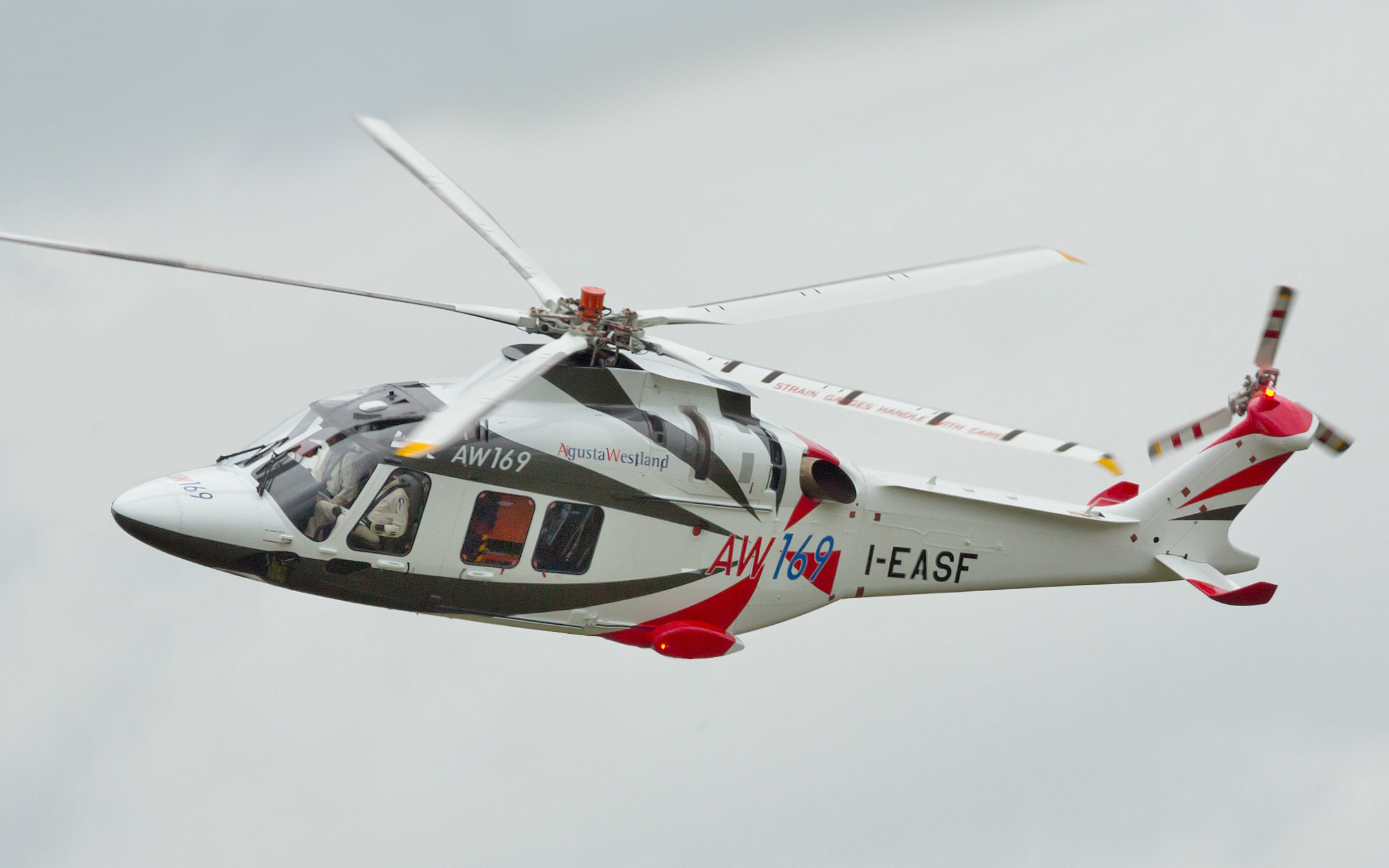
AgustaWestland AW169

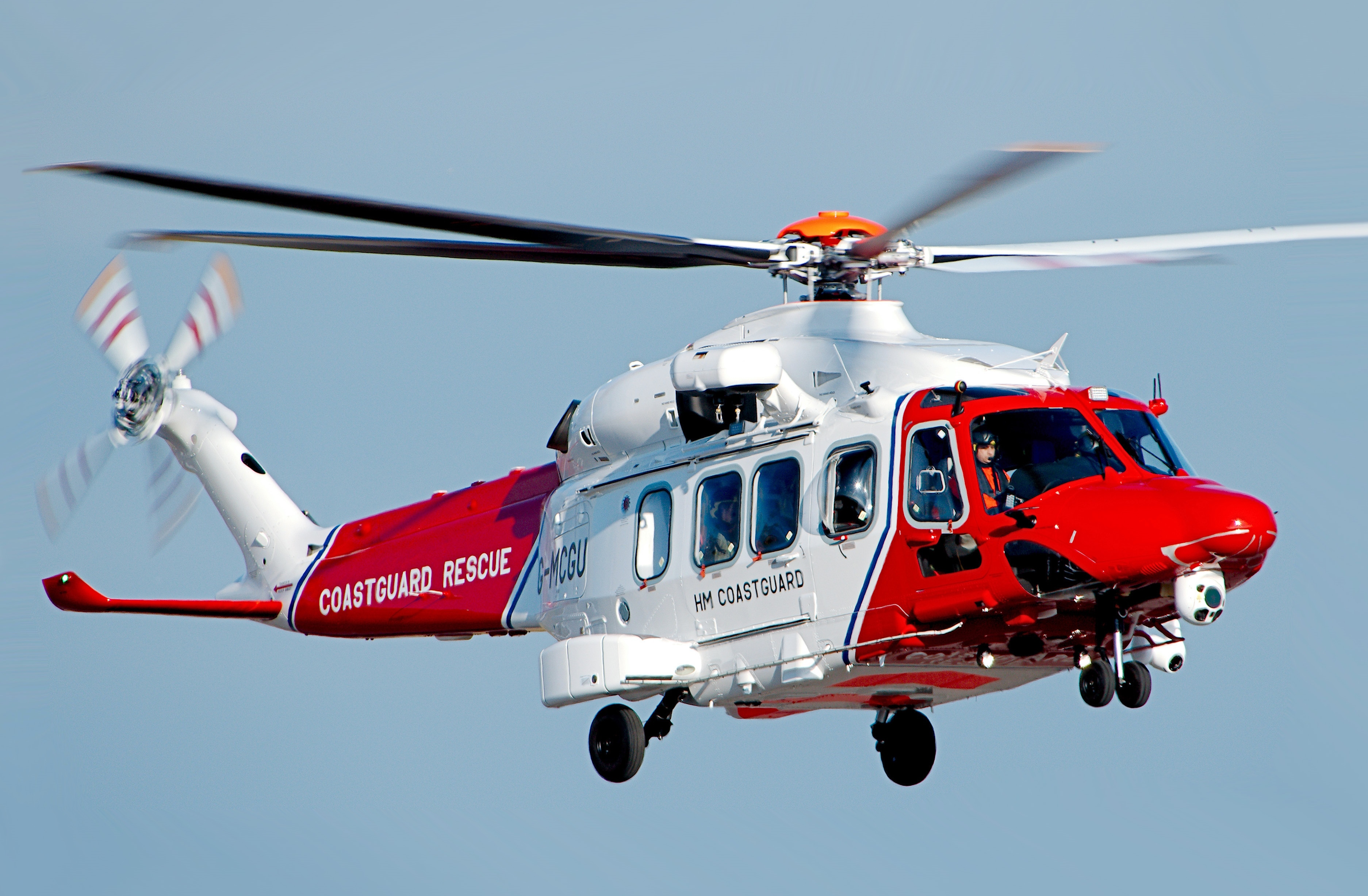
AgustaWestland AW189

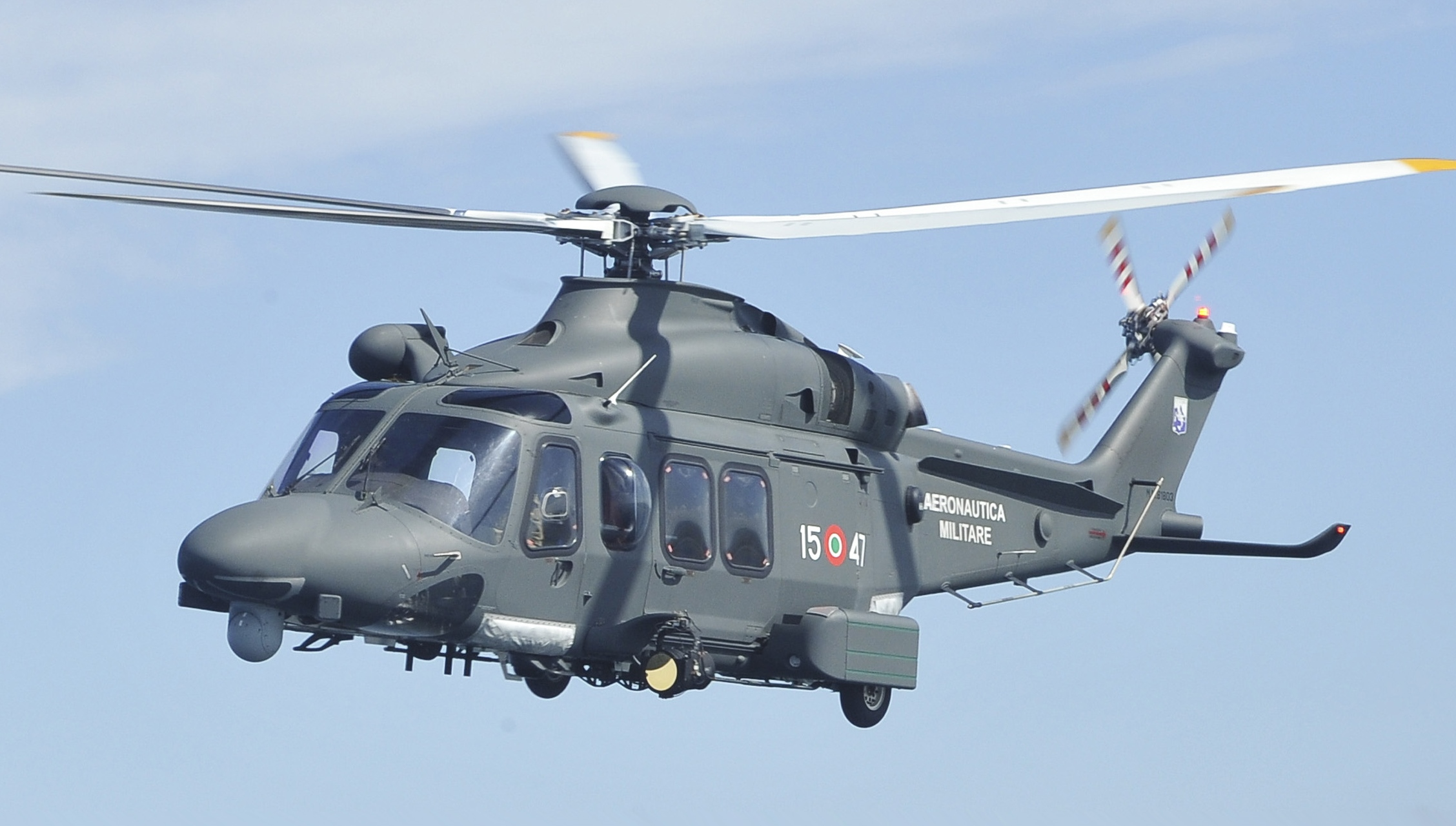
AgustaWestland AW139

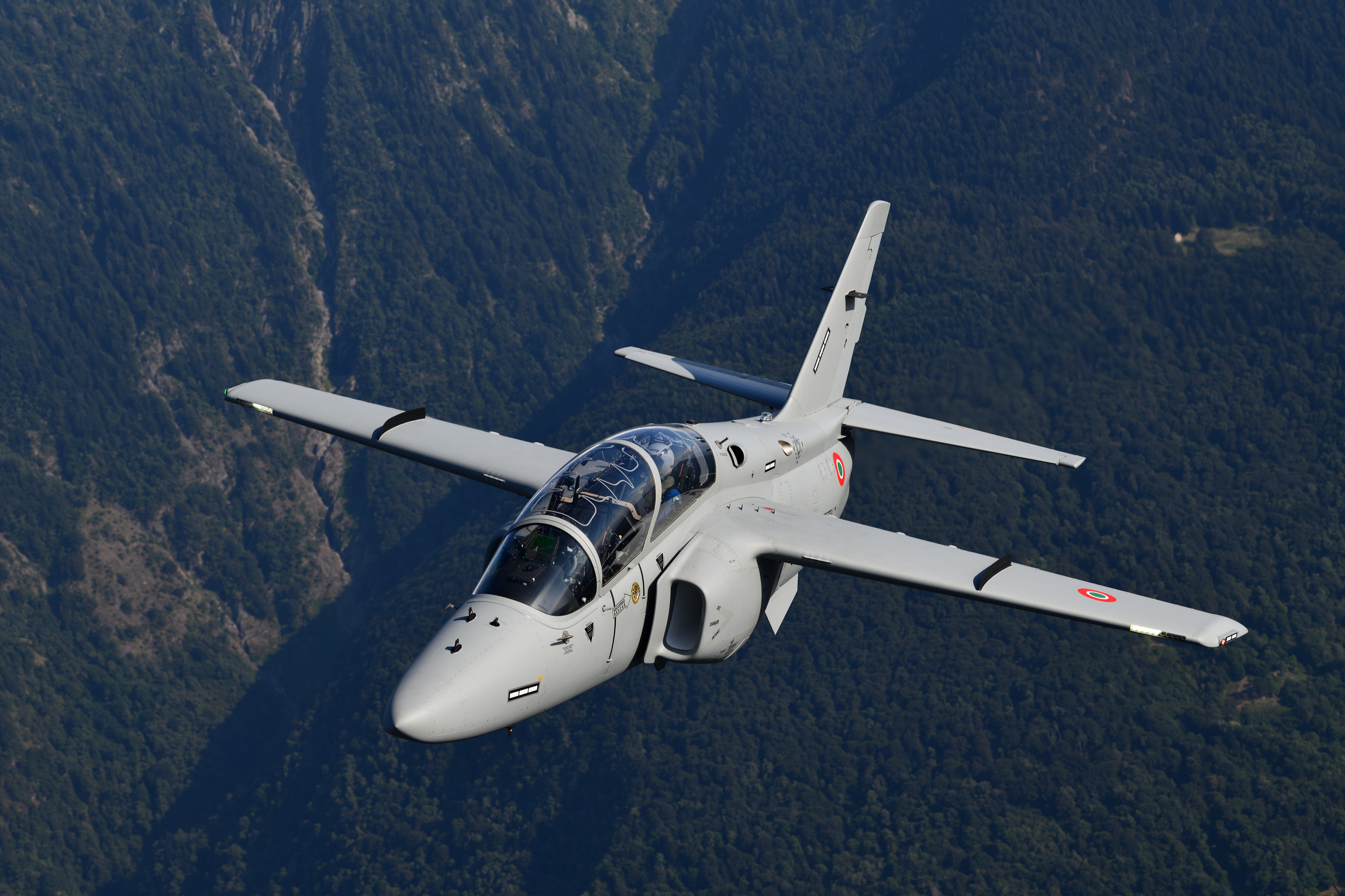
Aermacchi M-345

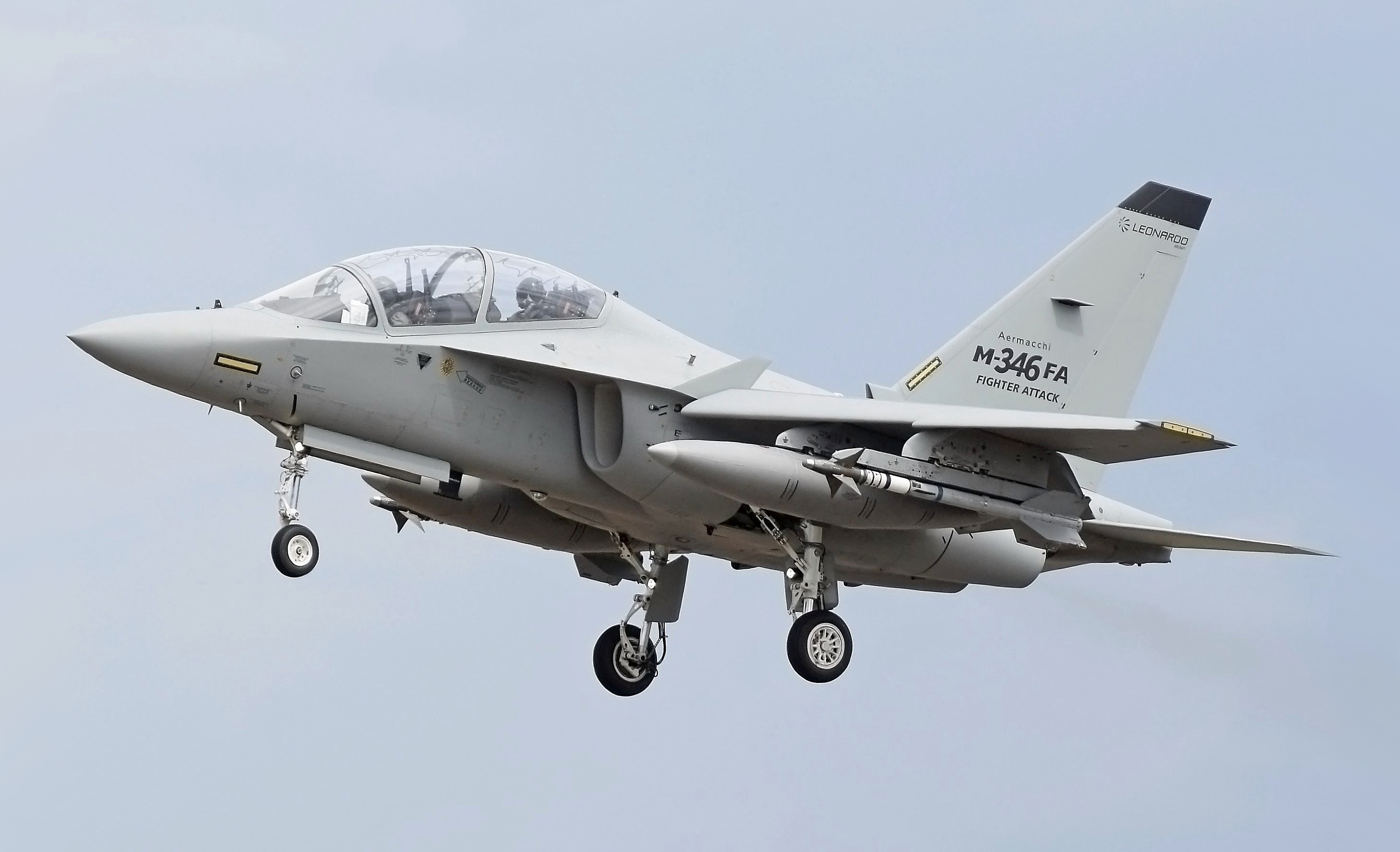
Aermacchi M-346

The world's oldest firearms manufacturer, Beretta, is located in Gardone Val Trompia. Other firearms manufacturers in the region are Tanfoglio and Pedersoli. Ammunition is produced by Fiocchi. The former OTO Melara, now part of Leonardo Electronics Division in Brescia, produces small-calibre naval and airborne weapons.

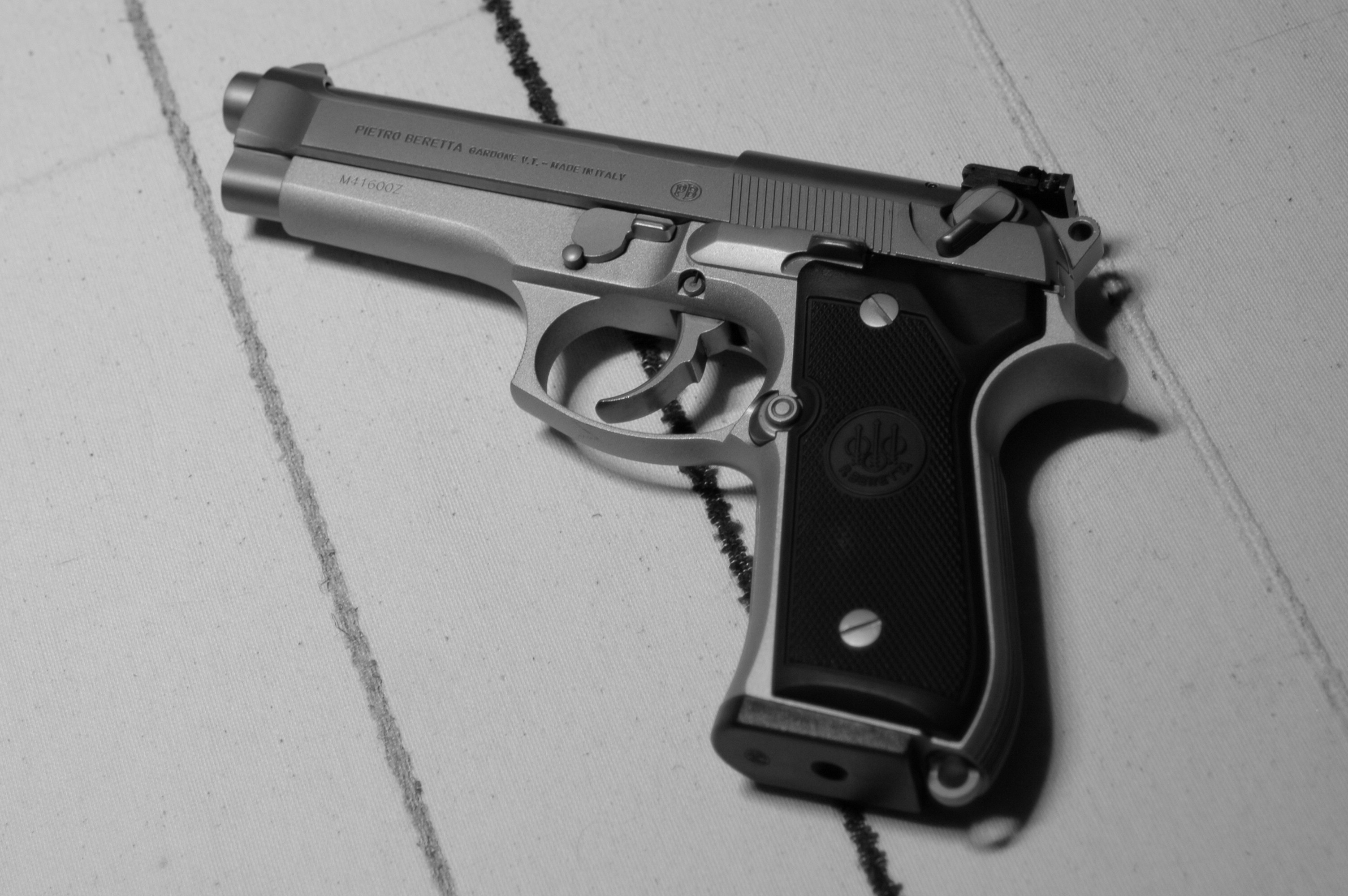
Beretta 92

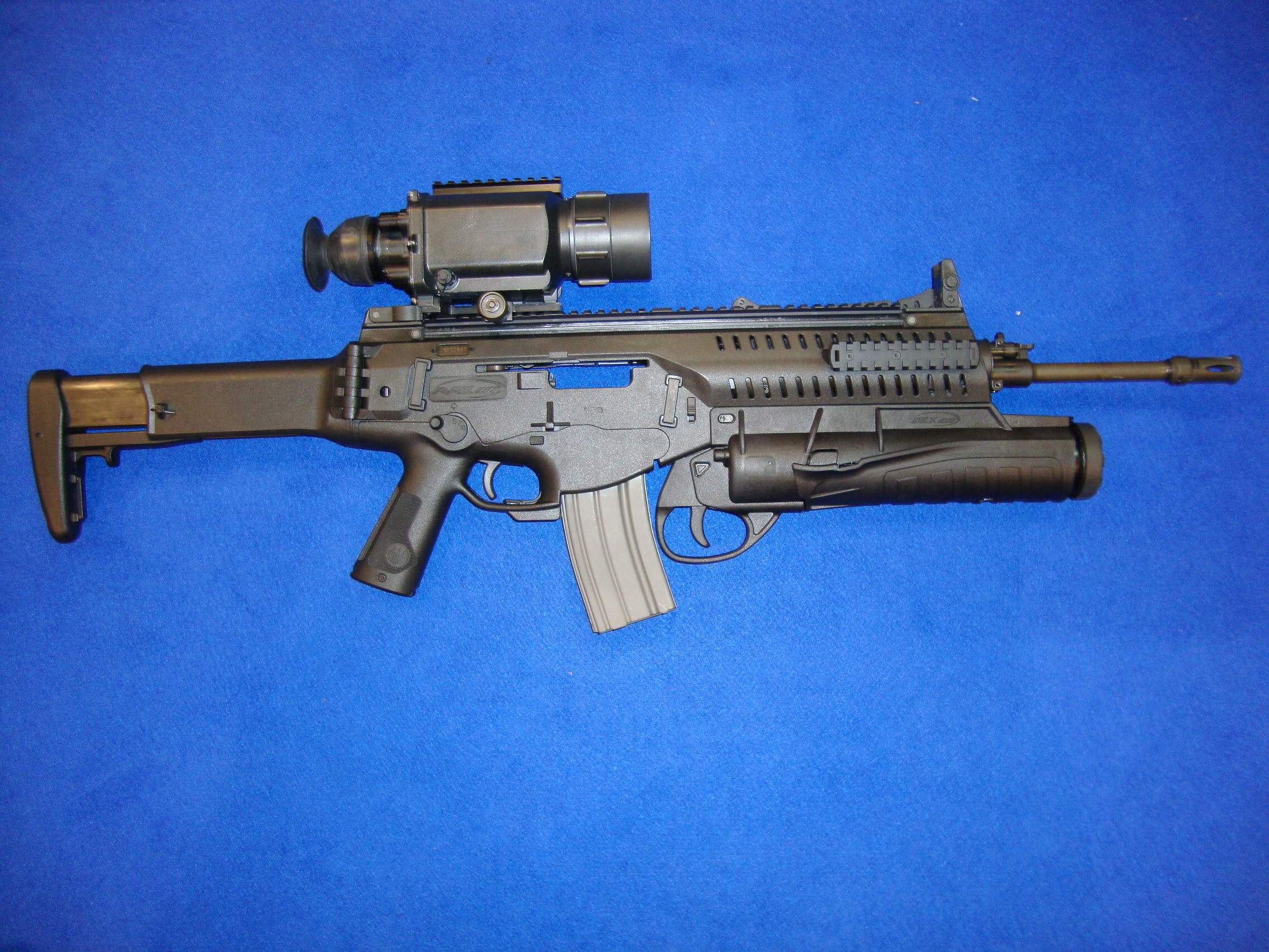
Beretta ARX160

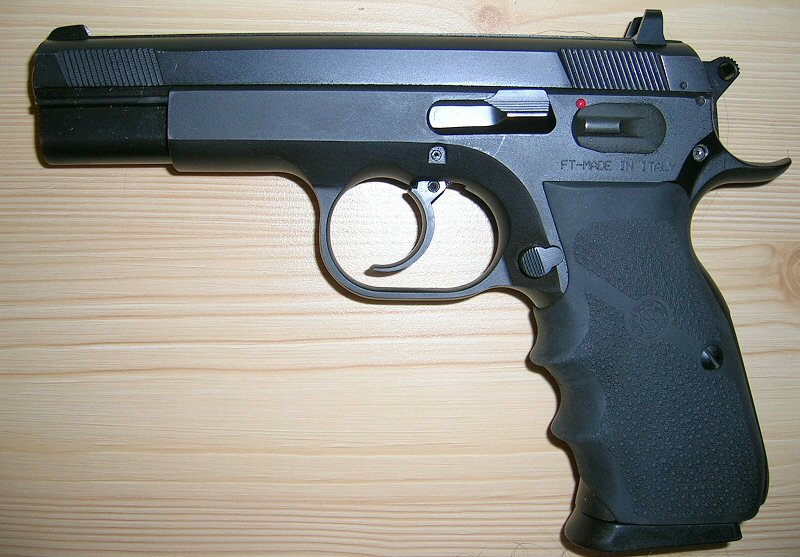
Tanfoglio Combat

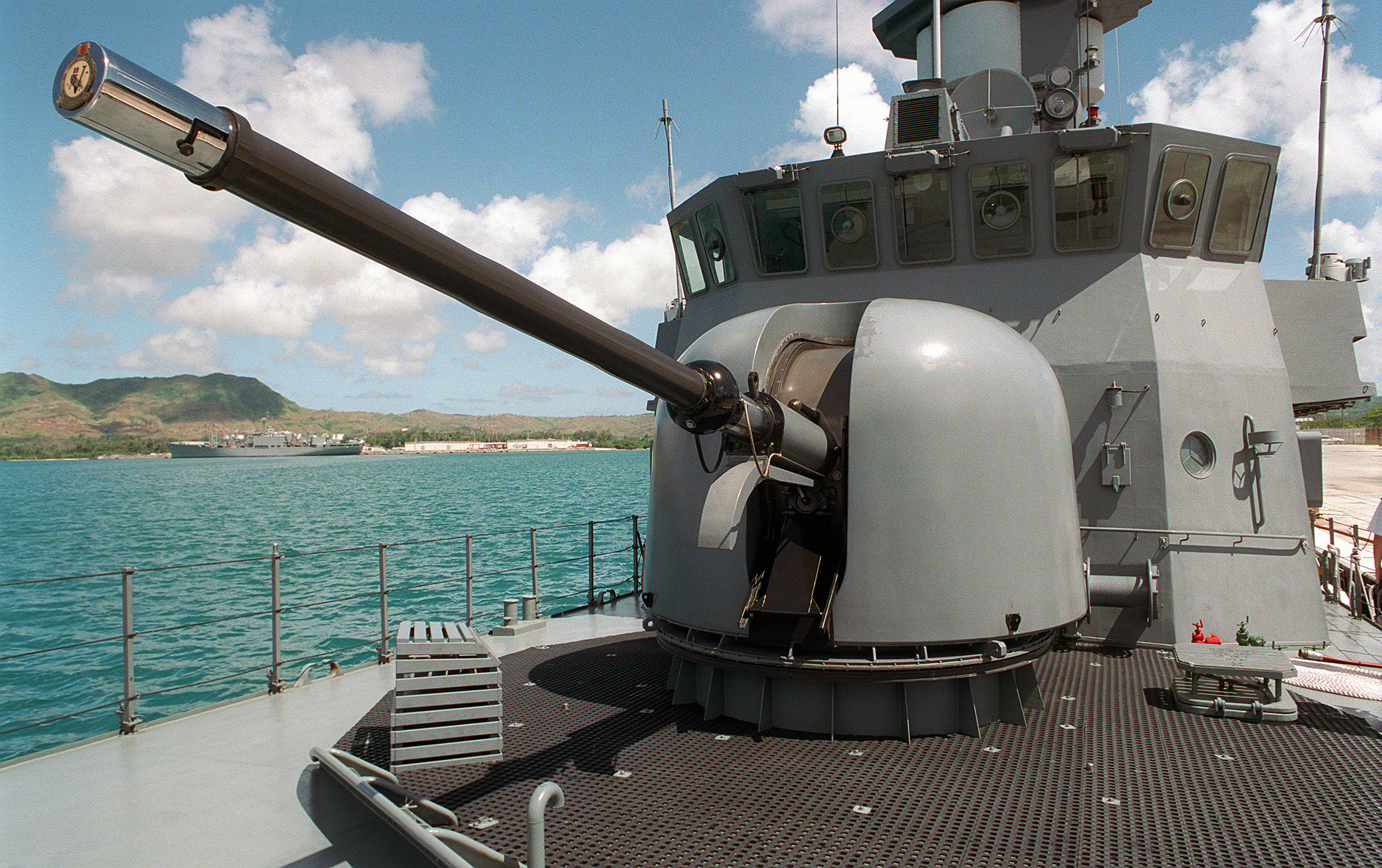
OTO Melara RSS Valour 76mm

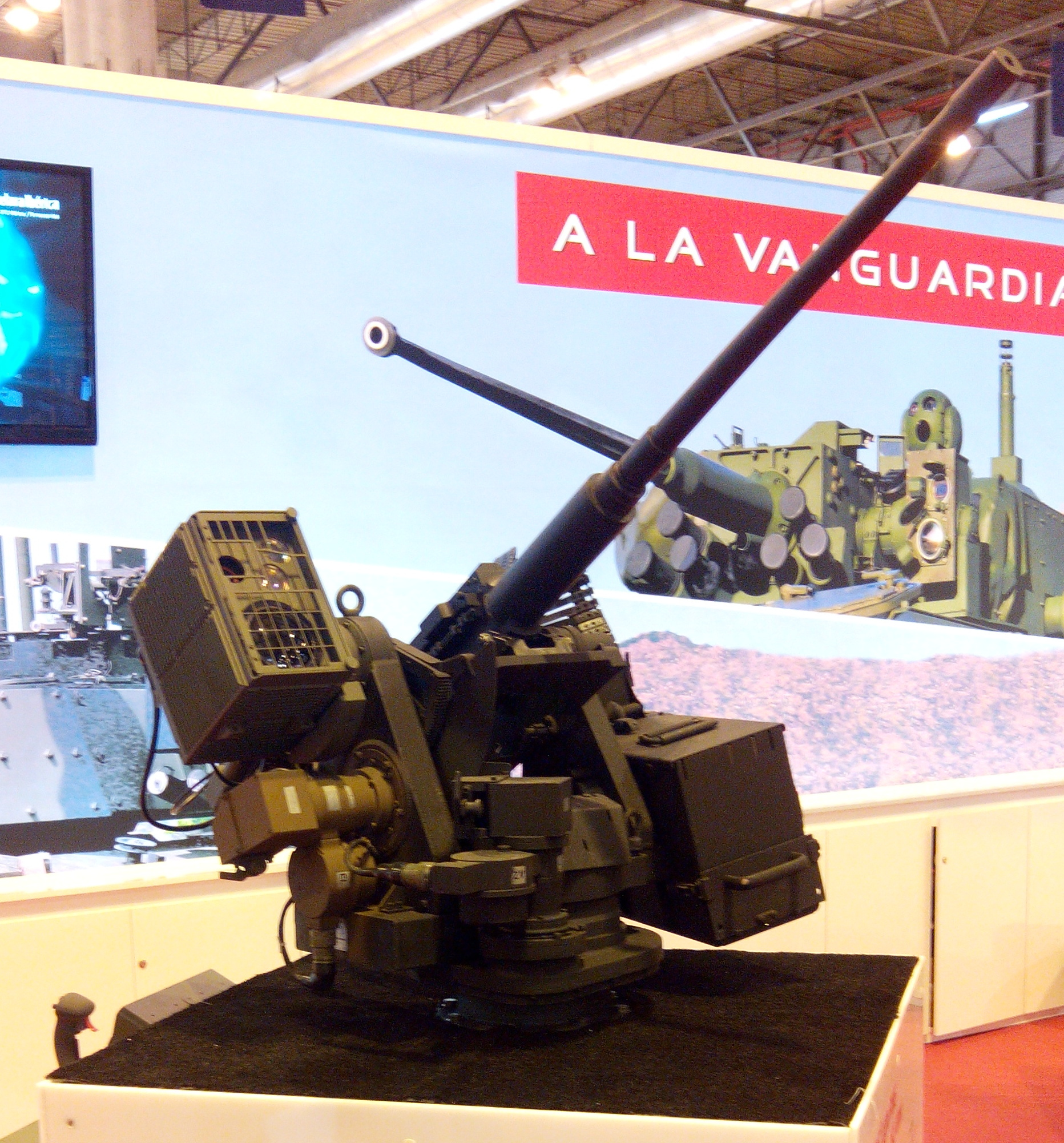
OTO Melara Hitrole

=== Automotive ===
There is no longer any car production in Lombardy; the factories of mass-market manufacturers Alfa Romeo, Autobianchi and Innocenti having been closed, abandoned or demolished. Iveco continues to manufacture light trucks Daily in Suzzara and makes EuroCargo lorries in Brescia. Same-Deutz Fahr manufactures tractors under the brands SAME and Lamborghini in Treviglio, and BCS Group makes tractors in Abbiategrasso.

The best-known automotive-parts suppliers are Brembo, Bergamo (ceramic brake systems); Pirelli, Milan (tyres); and Magneti Marelli, Corbetta (electronic systems, powertrain).

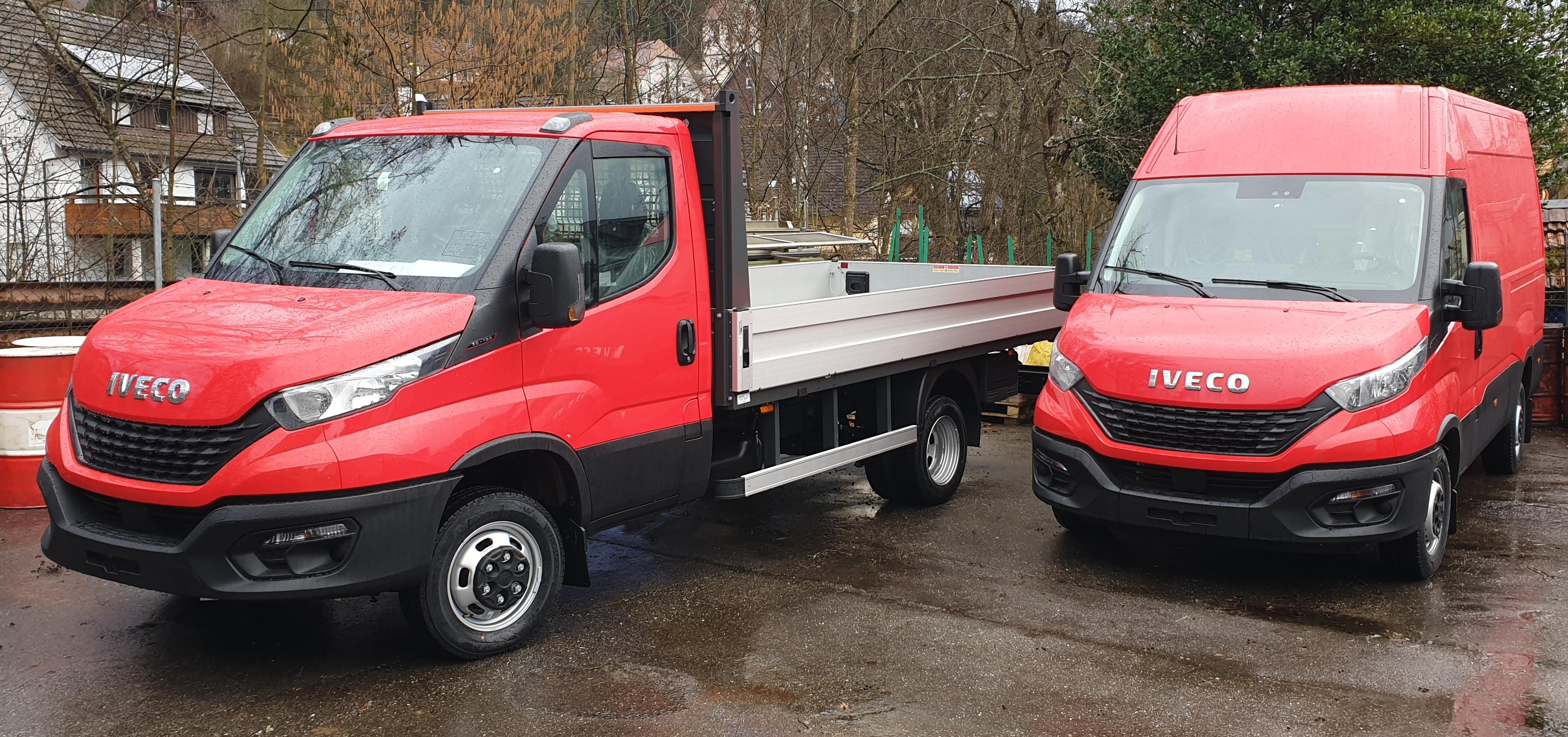
Iveco Daily VII.Generation

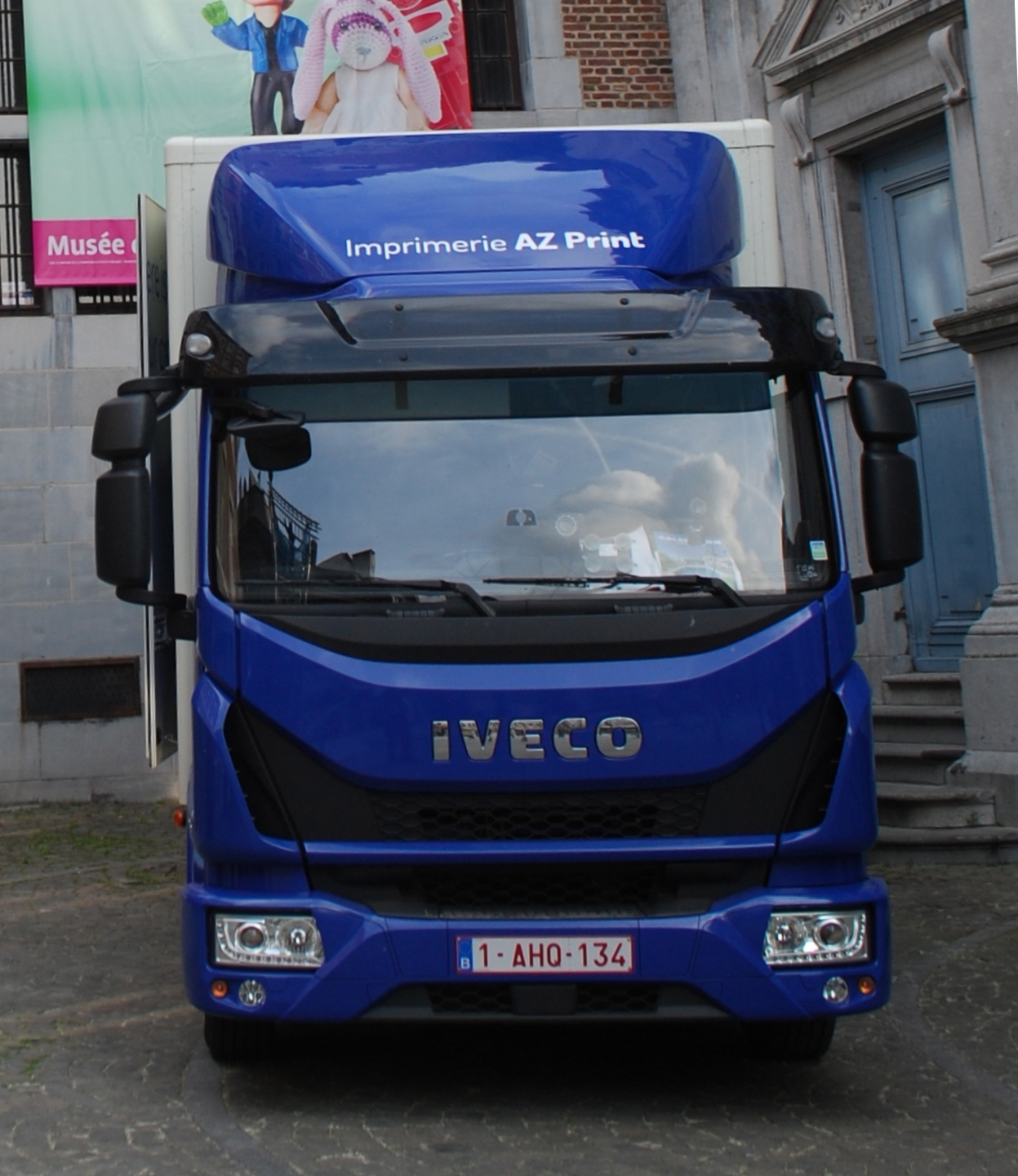
Iveco EuroCargo IV.Generation

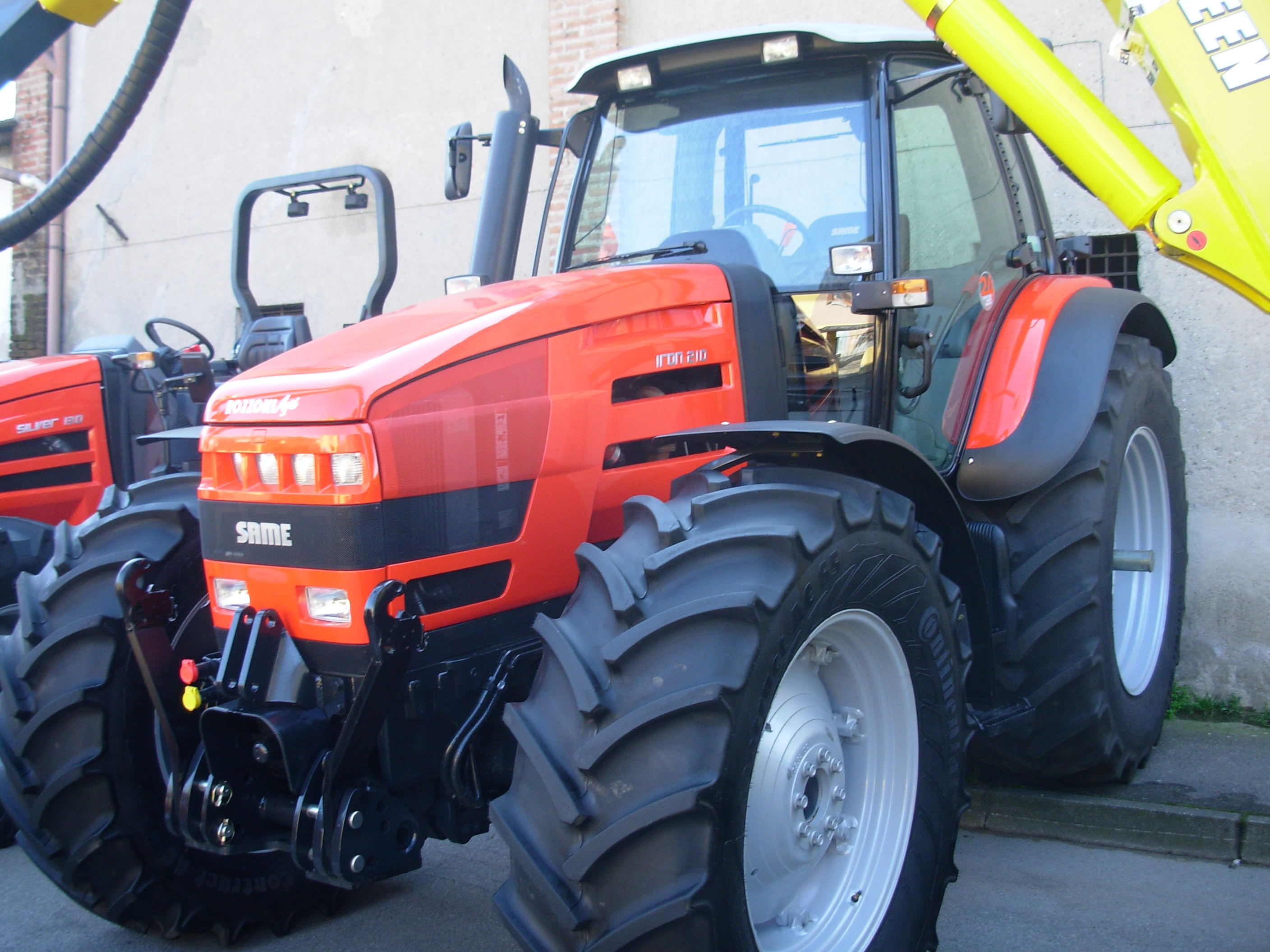
Same Iron 210

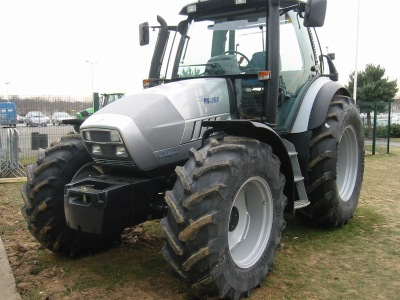
Lamborghini R6.150

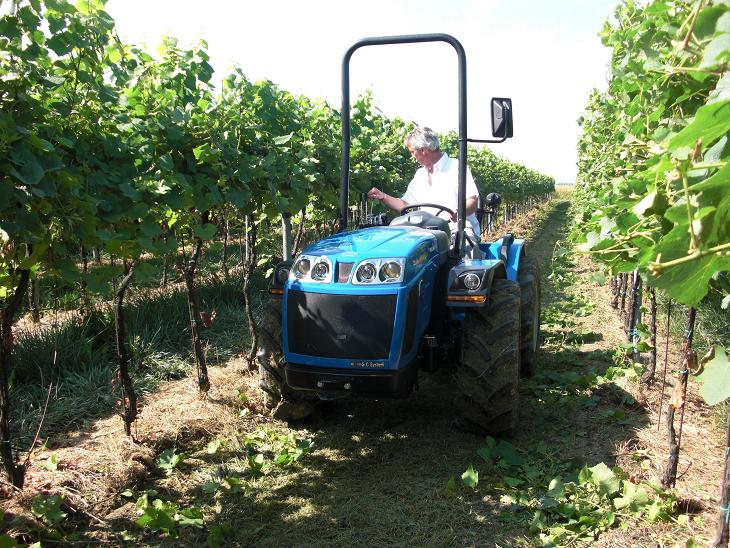
BCS Valiant

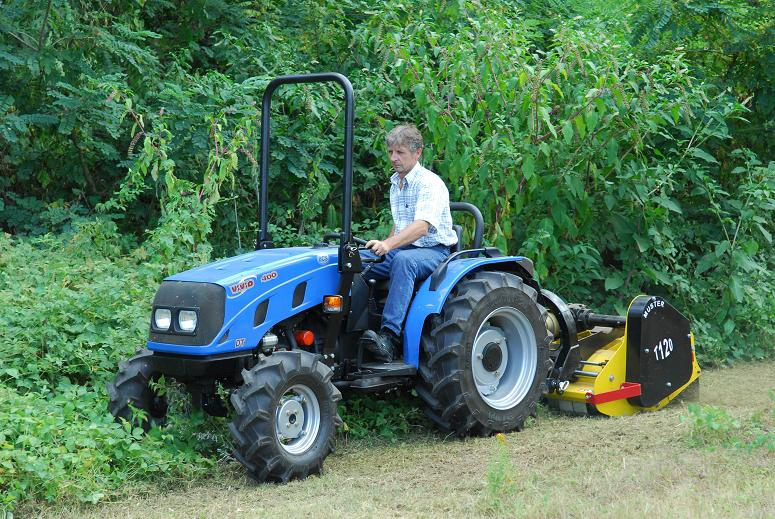
BCS Vivid

Motorcycles from Lombardy:

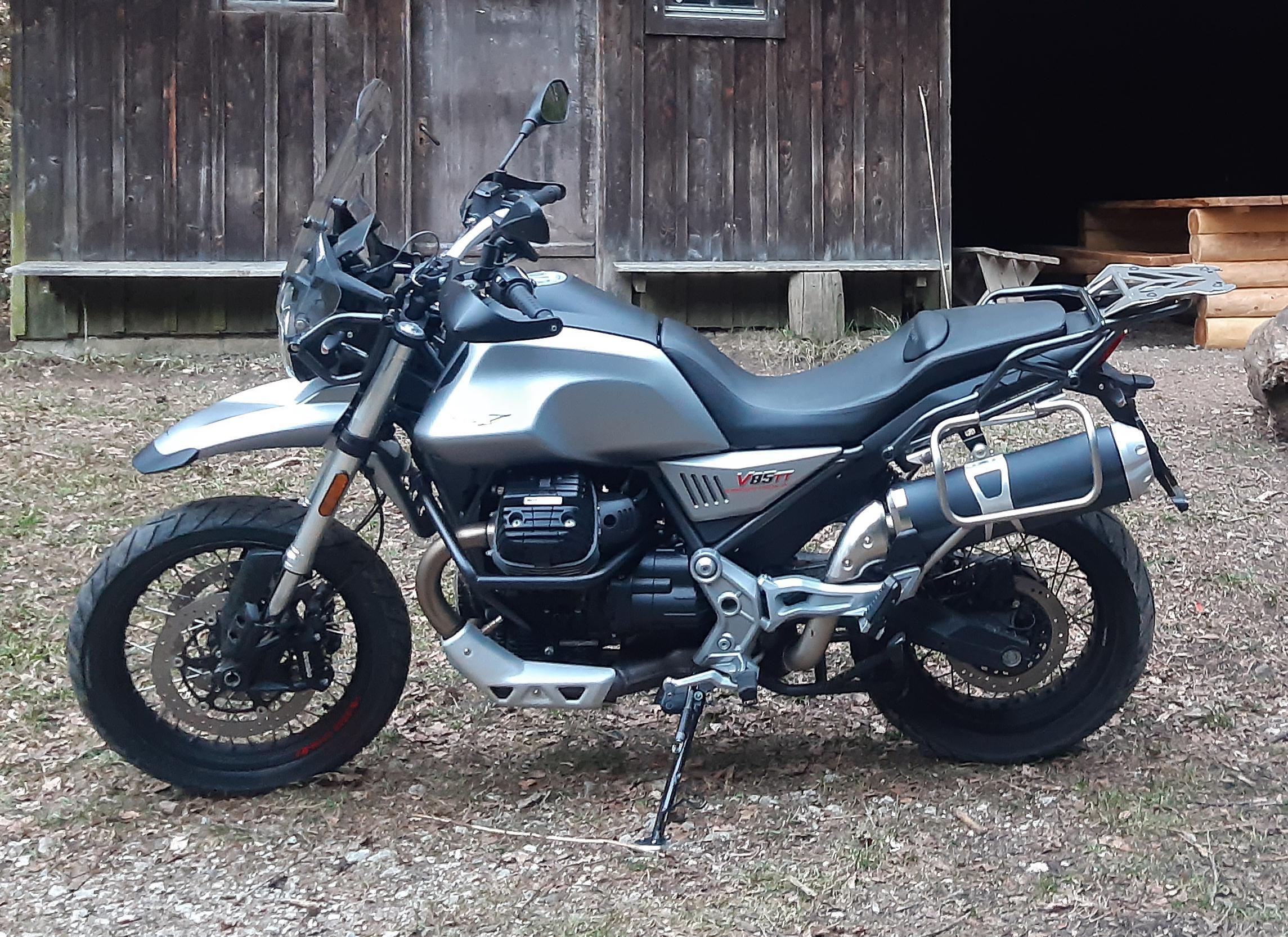
Moto Guzzi V85 TT (Piaggio)

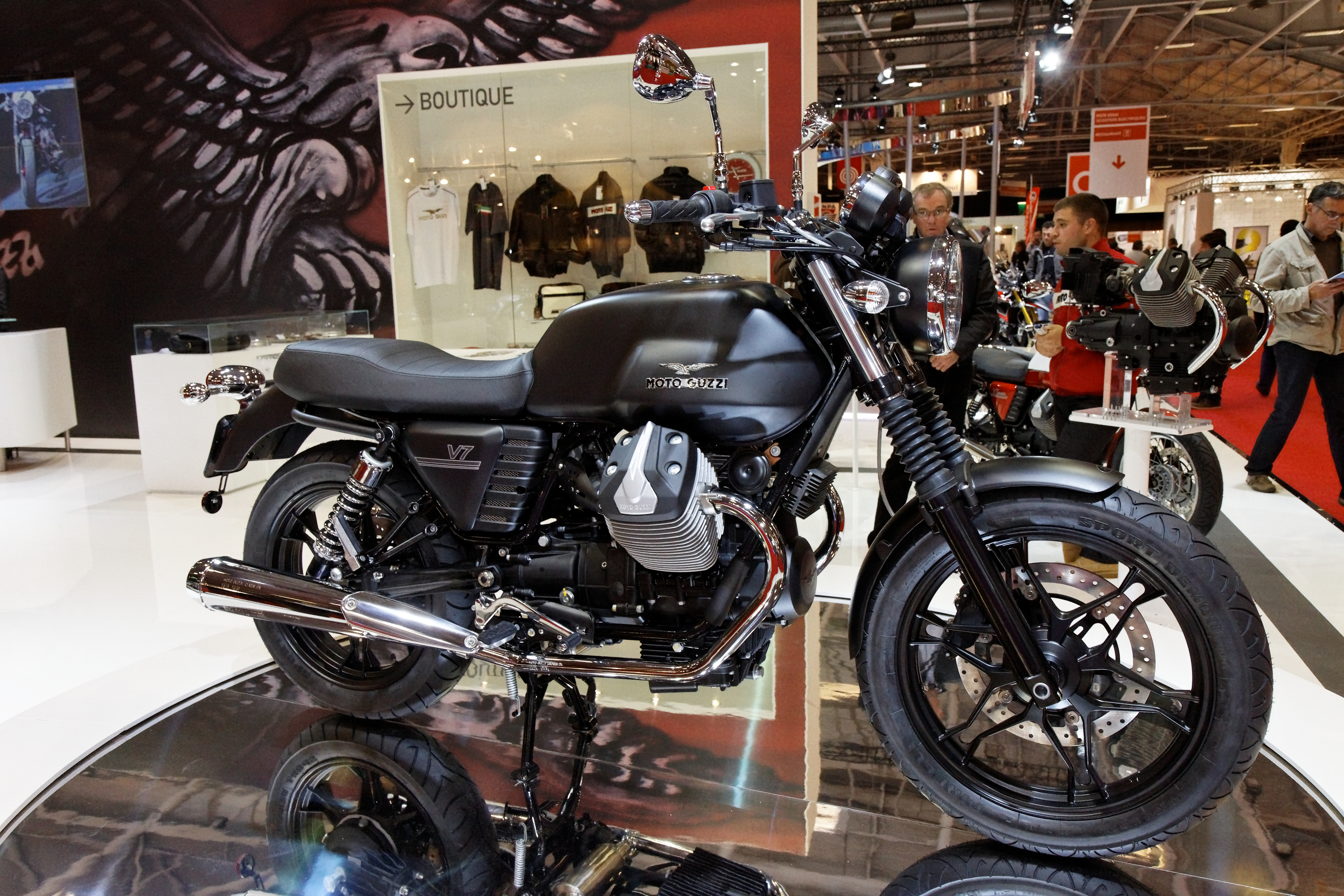
Moto Guzzi V7 Classic (Piaggio)

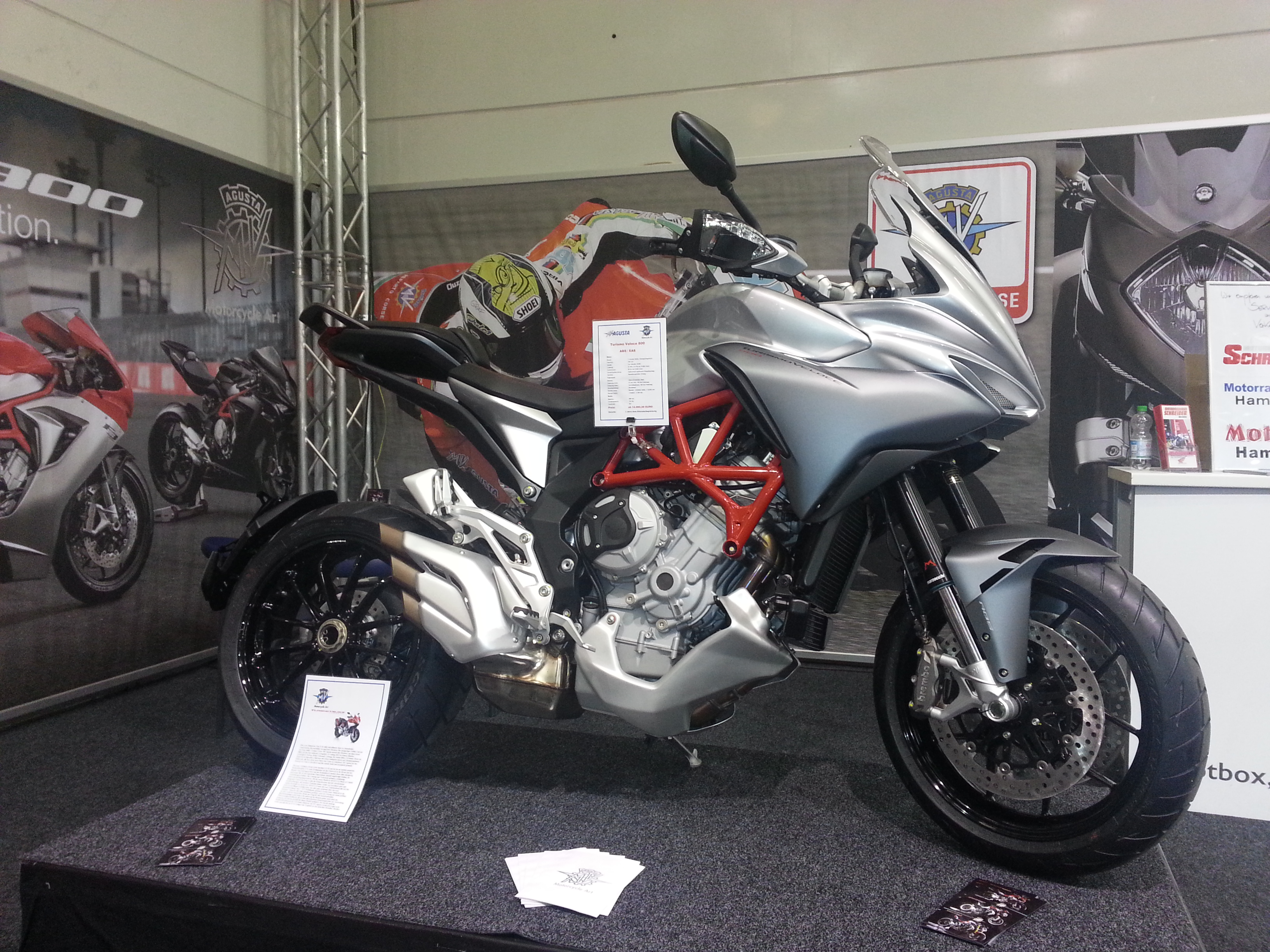
MV Agusta Turismo Veloce 800

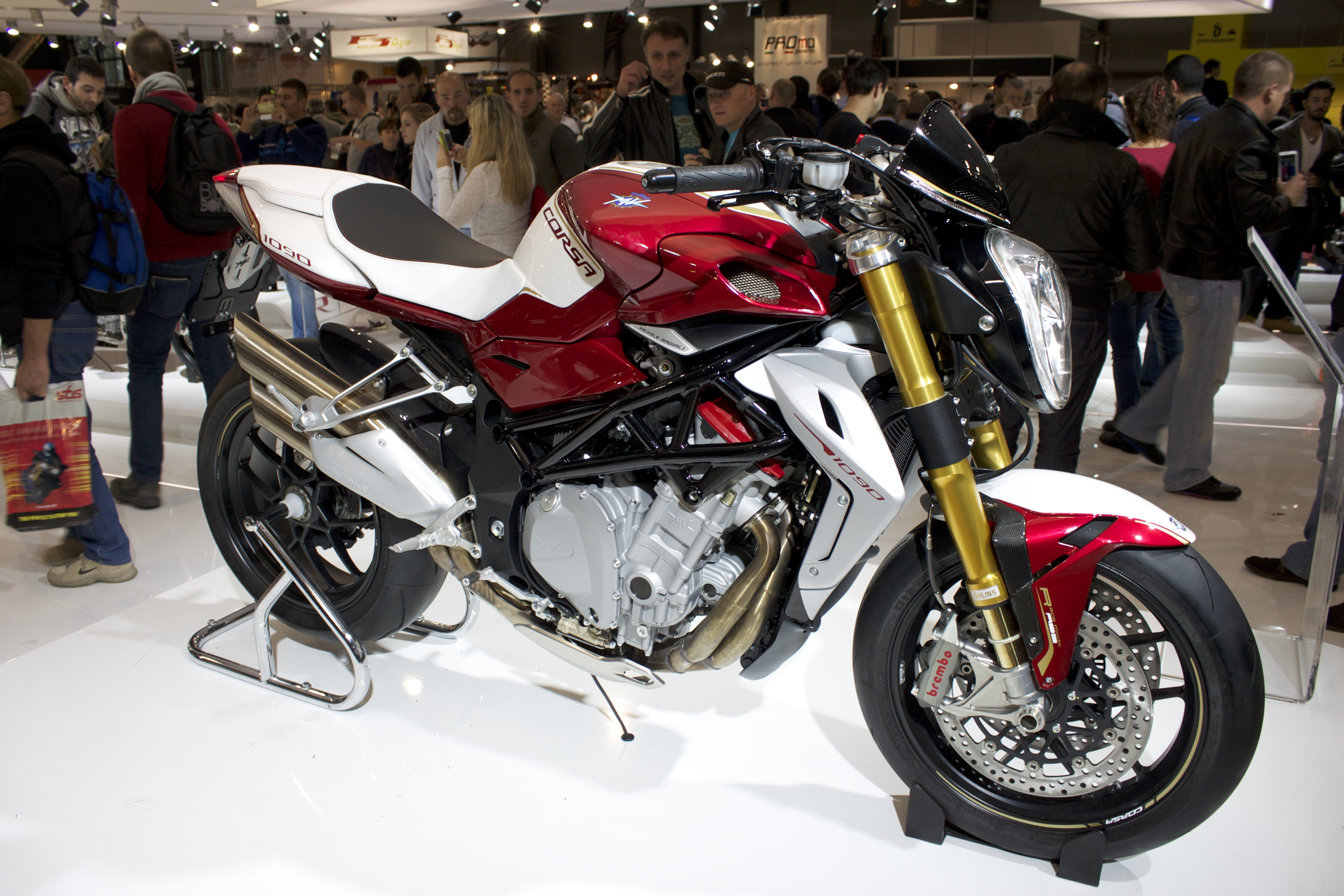
MV Agusta Brutale 1090

=== Electronics ===
The largest European semiconductor company STMicroelectronics employs 5,600 people at its plant in a suburb of Milan. Manufacturers of general-purpose integrated circuits Agrate Brianza, which employs 4,500, and Cornaredo, which employs 1,100, have R&D and production facilities.

SAES Getters in Lainate produce getters, alkaline metal dispensers, cathodes and materials for thermal management. Their products are used in various devices such as X-ray tubes, microwave tubes, solid-state lasers, electron sources, photomultipliers, radio-frequency amplification systems, night-vision devices, pressure sensors, gyroscopes for navigation systems and MEMS devices.

Magneti Marelli has headquarters and manufactures automotive electronics in Corbetta. Leonardo Electronics Division in Nerviano designs and develops airborne radar and computers, space equipment. Candy Hoover and Whirlpool (brands: Whirlpool, Indesit, Ariston, Hot Point, Ignis) make home appliances in Lombardy.

=== Energy ===
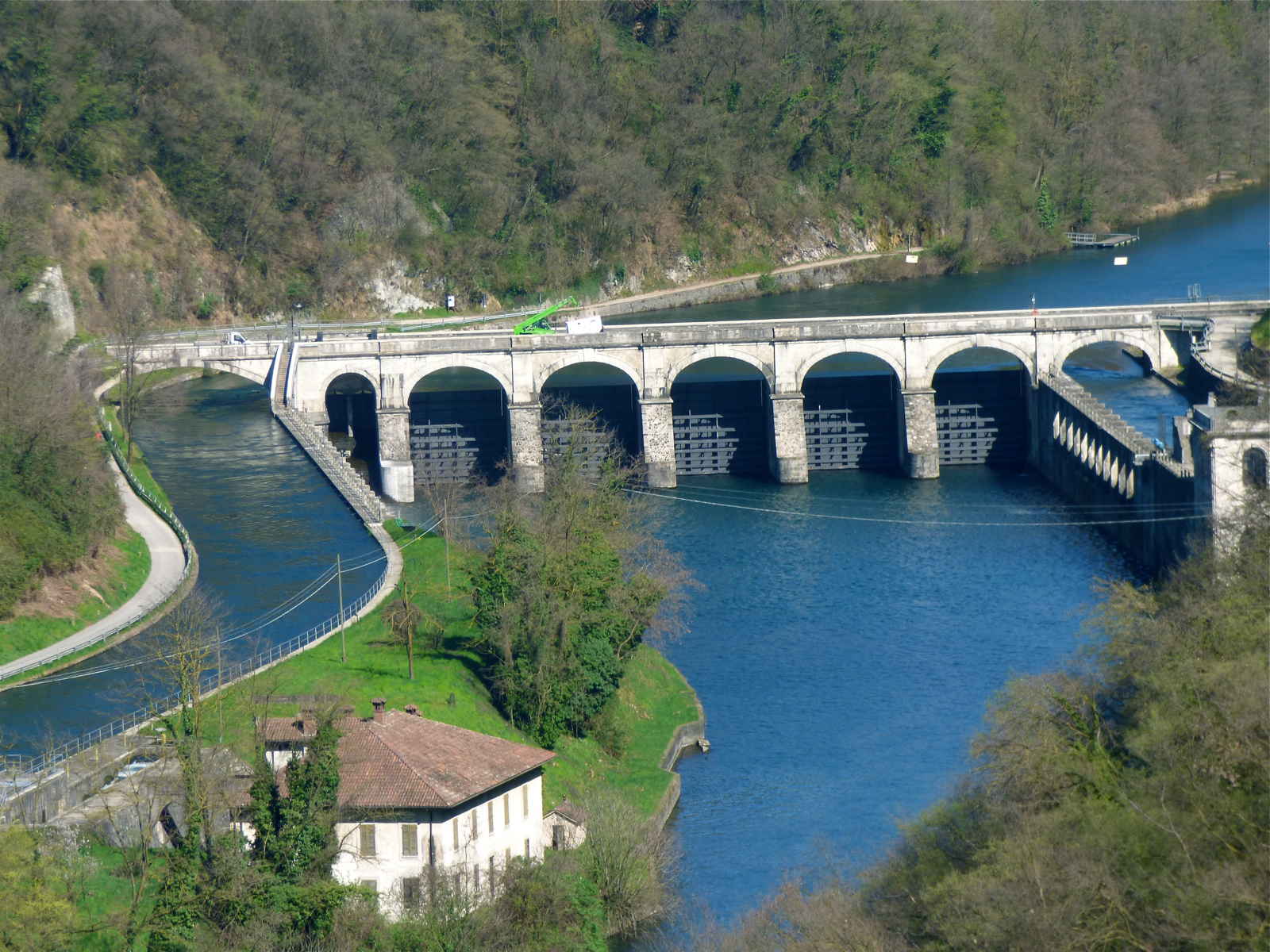
Semenza hydroelectric power station in Robbiate, in the province of Lecco, along the Adda river

In Lombardy, in 2015, electricity consumption per inhabitant amounted to 6,374 Wh. In the same year, gross energy production reached 41 GWh per 10,000 inhabitants and 26% of electricity consumption was covered by energy from renewable sources. There are 488 hydroelectric plants, 1,056 thermoelectric plants, 7 wind plants and 94,202 photovoltaic plants. The length of power lines in the region in 2014 is 3,867.8 km (2,403.34 mi), of which 2,190.8 km (1,361.30 mi) are 220 kV and 1,677 km (1,042.04 mi) are 380 kV.

=== Fashion ===
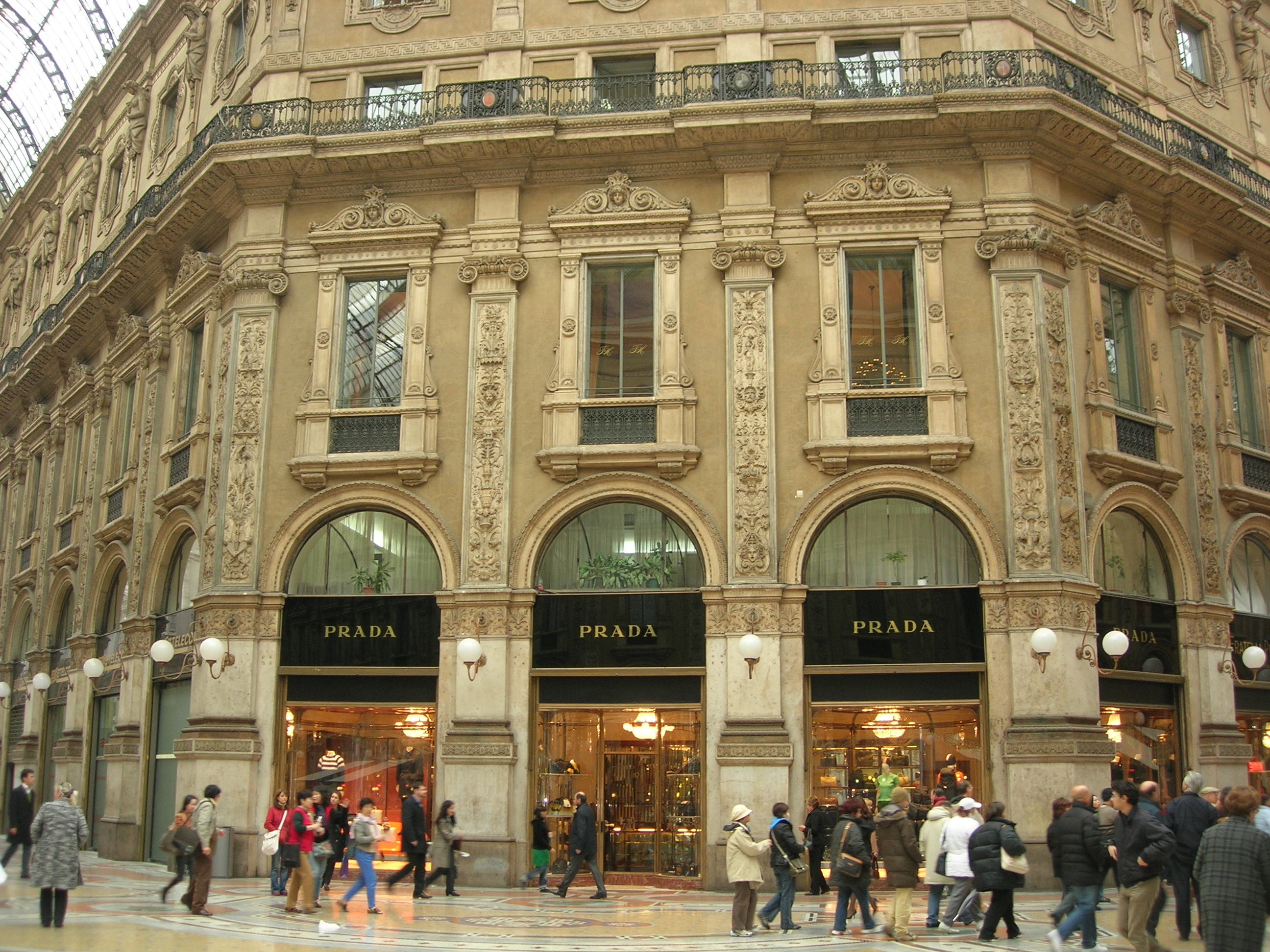
Prada shop at Galleria Vittorio Emanuele II in Milan

Milan is a fashion capital of the world. Lombardy has always been an important centre for silk and textile production, notably the cities of Pavia, Vigevano and Cremona. Milan is one of the fashion capitals of the world; the city has approximately 12,000 companies, 800 showrooms and 6,000 sales outlets; the city hosts the headquarters of global fashion houses. The best-known high-class shopping district is Quadrilatero della moda.

In 2009, Milan was regarded as the world fashion capital, surpassing New York, Paris and London. Most of the major Italian fashion brands, such as Luxottica, Valentino, Versace, Prada, Armani, Dolce & Gabbana and Zegna are currently headquartered in Milan. Buttons are manufactured in the industrial districts of Grumello del Monte and Palosco.

=== Furniture ===
Furniture is manufactured in the industrial district around Brianza, which has an annual turnover of about €2 billion from 1,700 companies. The furniture factories, which have about 40,000 employees, are mainly concentrated in Lissone, Meda, Cantù and Mariano Comense. This district has close relations with Milan's design industry. A number of large furniture exhibitions take place in Milan, including "Salone del Mobile Milano".

=== Tourism ===
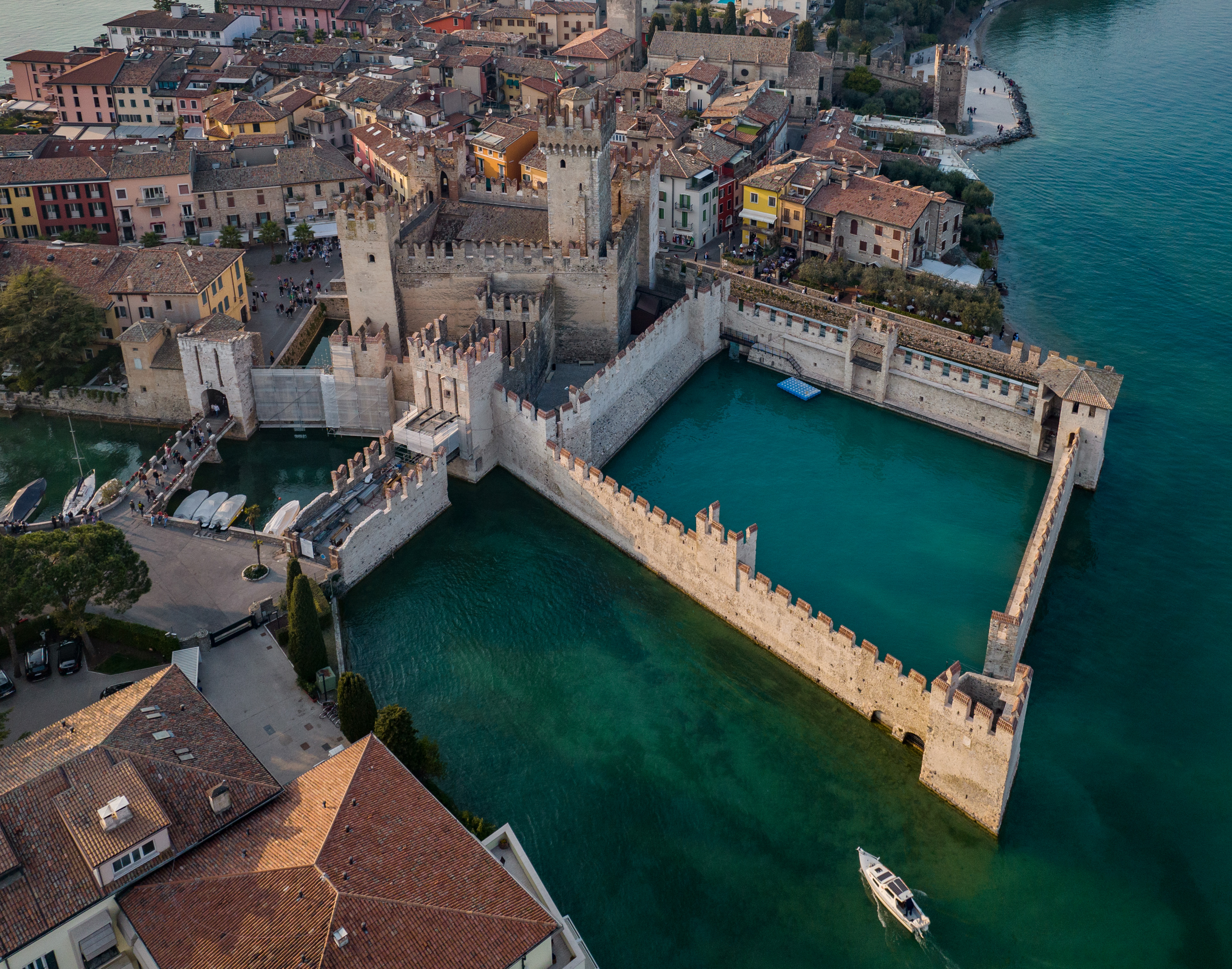
Scaligero Castle in Sirmione on the shore of Lake Garda

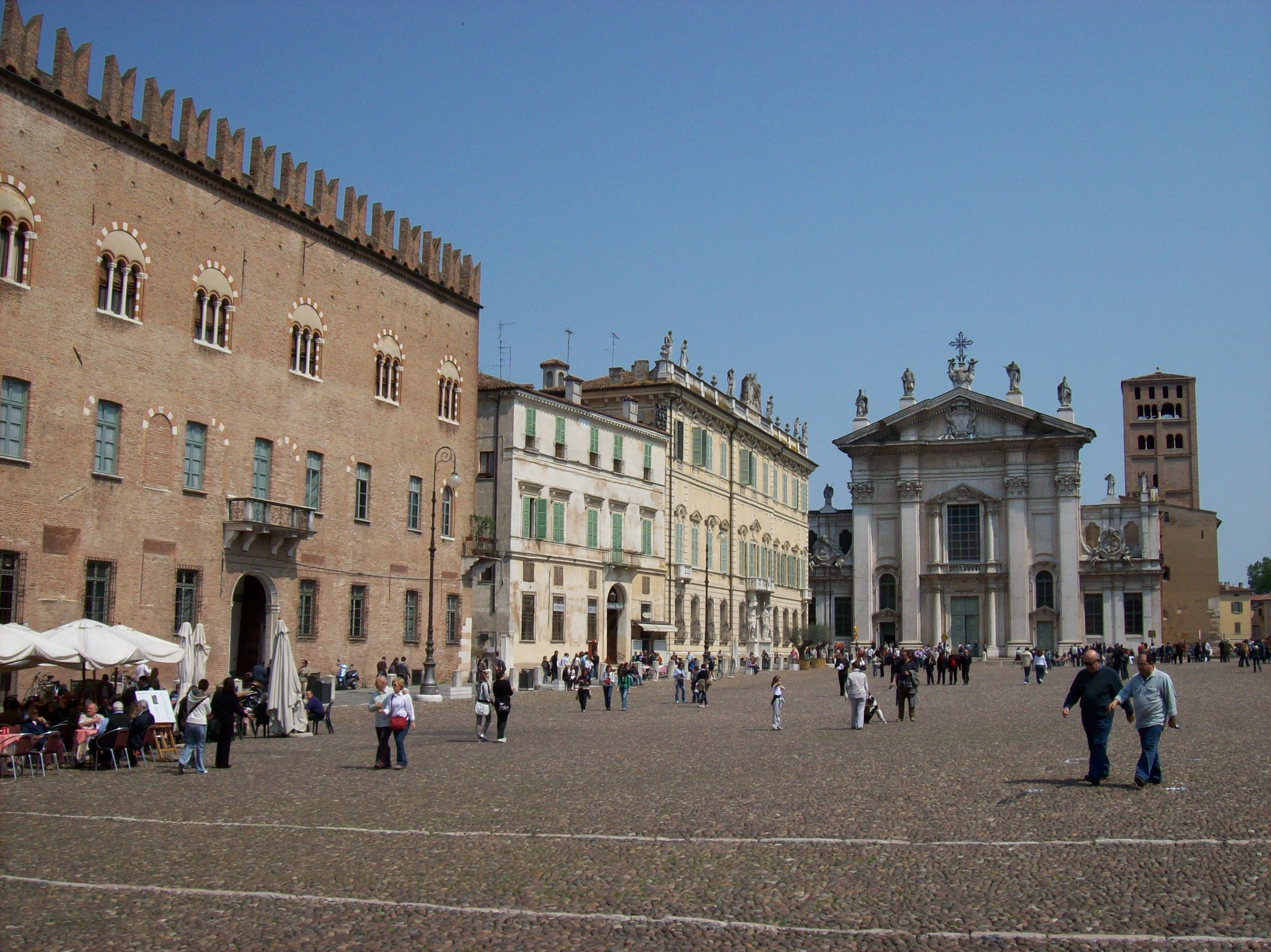
Mantua

In the most dynamic and busiest of Italian regions it is not possible, on the basis of the figures, to distinguish tourists in the strict sense from those who travel for business. In 2019, 40,482,939 arrivals were recorded. Non-residents contributed to 51.8% of arrivals and 57.4% of presences.

Lombardy has a rich, diverse cultural heritage ranging from prehistory to the present day. Artefacts from the Roman period and the Renaissance can be found in museums and churches. Major tourist destinations in the region include (in order of arrivals as of 2013):

- Milan (4,527,889 arrivals)
- Lake Garda (429,376)
- Lake Como (322,585)
- Bergamo (242,942)
- Brescia (229,710)
- Como (215,320)
- Lake Iseo (123,337)
- Varese (107,442)
- Mantua (88,902)
- Monza (75,839)
- Lake Maggiore (71,055)
- Pavia (56,604)

Among the sight-seeing opportunities, the pre-Alpine lakes on whose shores patrician villas, vegetable gardens, gardens, terraces and ancient villages alternate with dense clusters of second homes. The coastal locations are connected by scheduled shipping routes. Villa d'Este in Cernobbio and other villas in the Como area host world-famous people: financial magnates, film stars, writers, heads of state, singers and stylists.

Other important tourist flows concern the Alpine valleys (in particular Valtellina) and the numerous historical-artistic cities, rich in monuments and testimonies of the Middle Ages and the Italian Renaissance.

Among the most visited places are the Pinacoteca di Brera (336,981 visitors), Leonardo da Vinci's Last Supper (330,071), the Archaeological Museum of Sirmione with the Grottoes of Catullus (216,612), the Scaligero Castle (202,066), Certosa di Pavia (approximately 200,000) and Villa Carlotta (170,260).

=== Unemployment ===
The unemployment rate of Lombardy stood at 4.3% in 2023. In that year, regional unemployment was one of the lowest in Italy.

| Year | 2006 | 2007 | 2008 | 2009 | 2010 | 2011 | 2012 | 2013 | 2014 | 2015 | 2016 | 2017 | 2018 | 2019 | 2020 | 2021 | 2022 | 2023 |
|---|---|---|---|---|---|---|---|---|---|---|---|---|---|---|---|---|---|---|
| unemployment rate (in %) | 3.7% | 3.4% | 3.7% | 5.3% | 5.5% | 5.7% | 7.4% | 8.0% | 8.2% | 7.9% | 7.4% | 6.4% | 6.0% | 5.6% | 5.0% | 5.9% | 4.9% | 4.3% |

== Transport ==
=== Airports ===
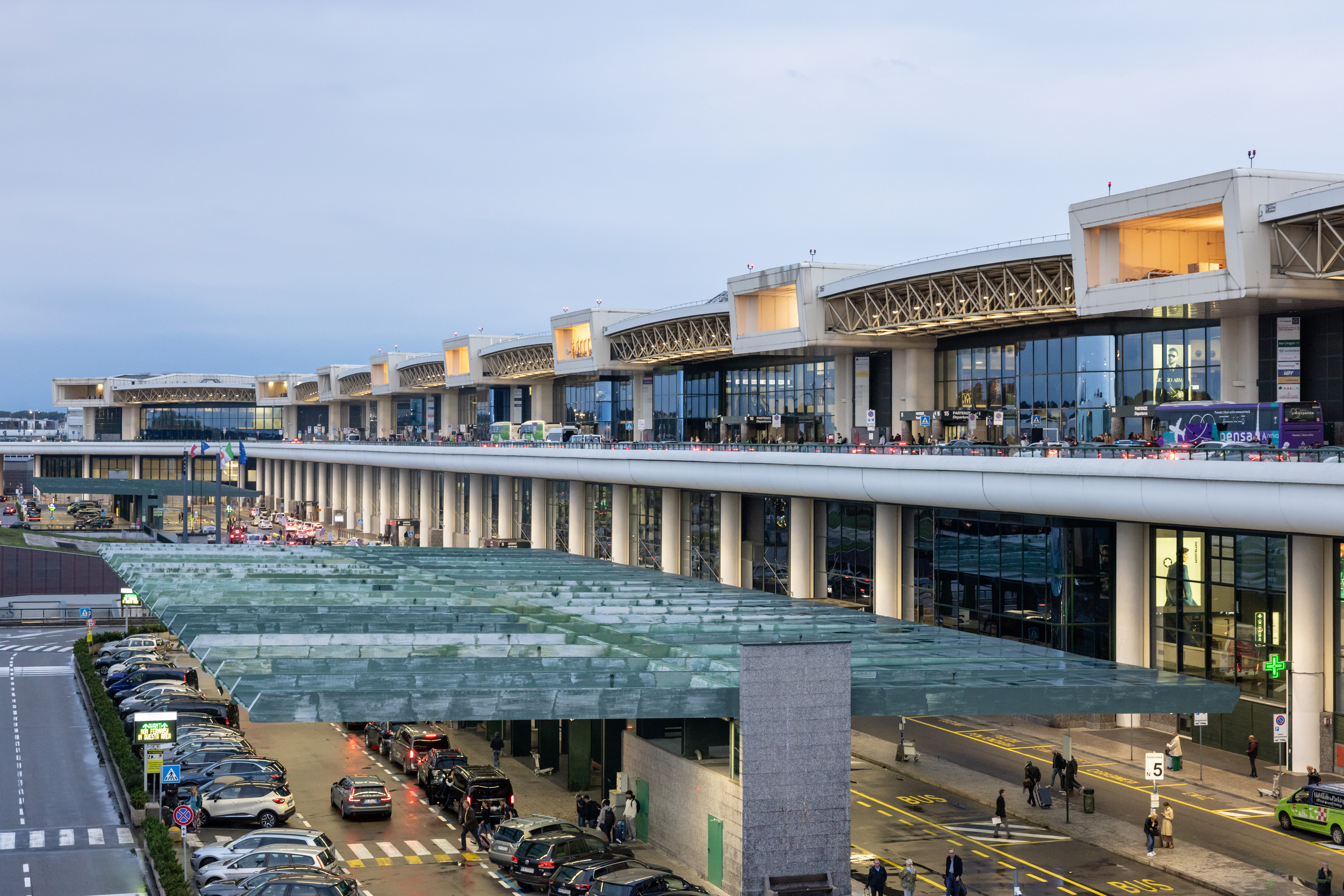
The intercontinental hub of Milan Malpensa Airport is 9th in the world and 6th in Europe for the number of countries served with direct scheduled flights.

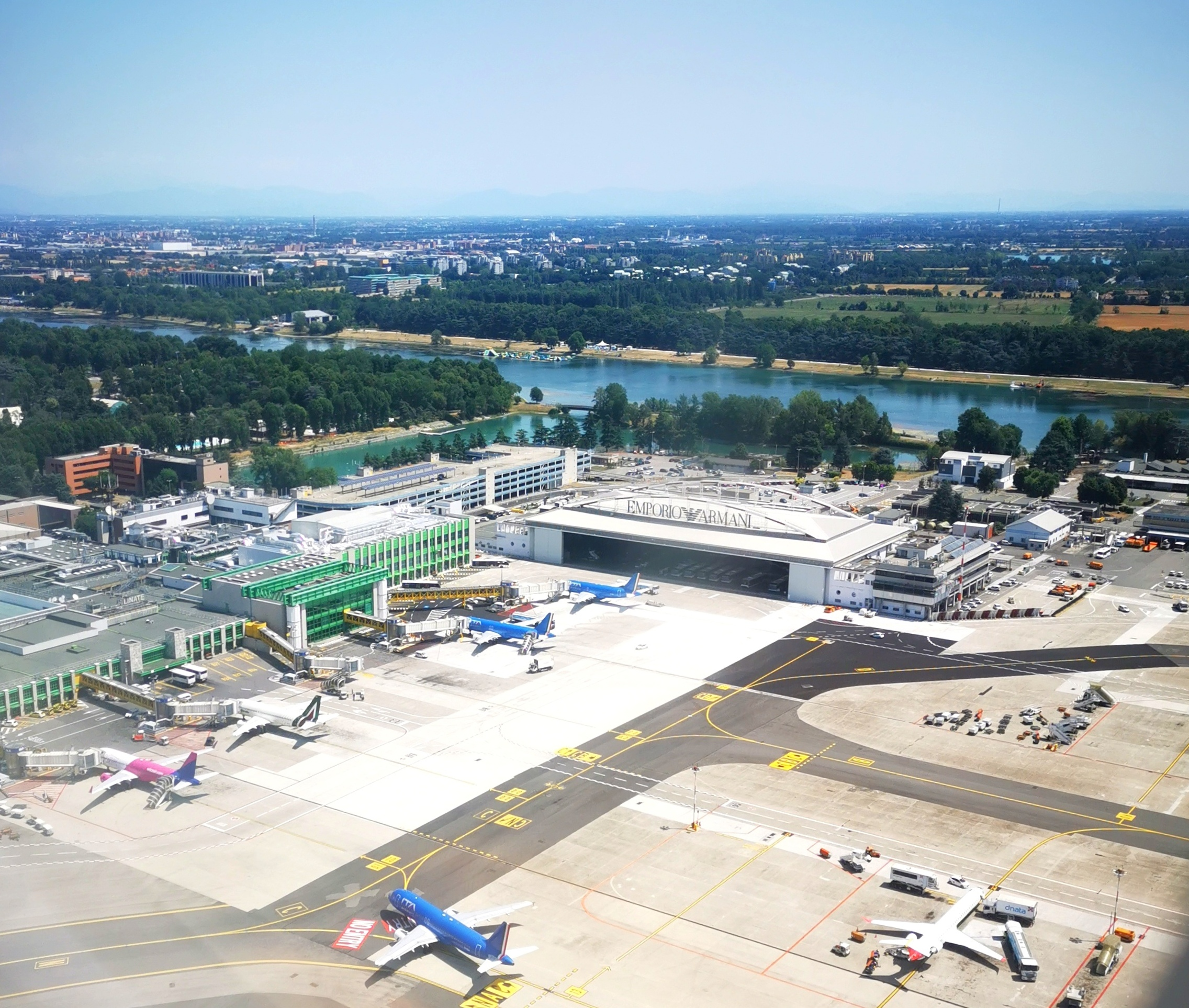
Milan Linate Airport is the 8th airport in Italy for passenger traffic.

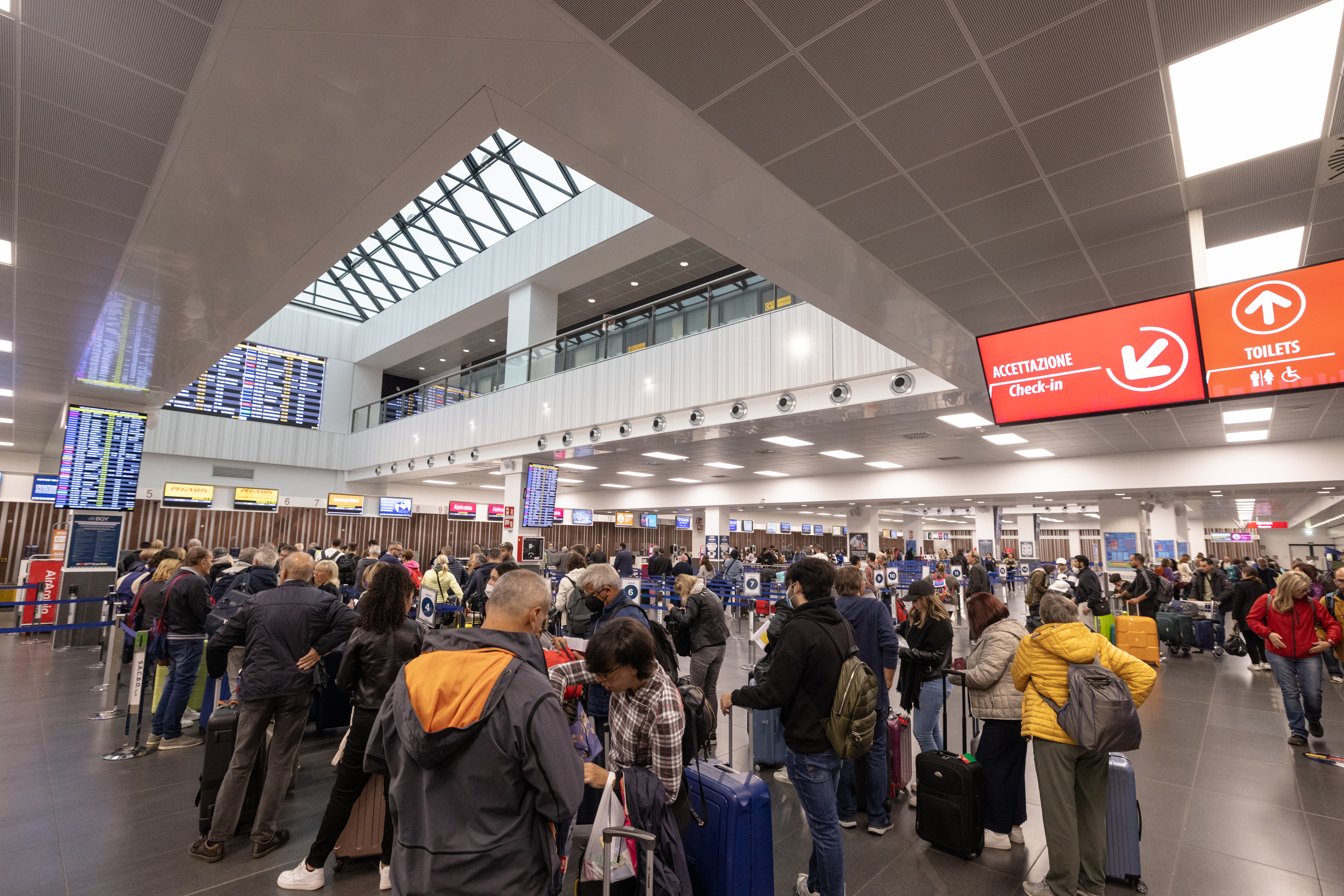
Departures area of the Milan Bergamo Airport. It is one of Ryanair's three main operating bases, along with Dublin Airport and London Stansted Airport.

The airport service in Lombardy is made up of 4 main airports and represents the most important airport system in Italy. In the surroundings of Milan there are three airports dedicated to normal civilian traffic (Milan Malpensa Airport and Milan Linate Airport, managed by SEA, and Milan Bergamo Airport by SACBO).

Overall, the Milan airport system handles traffic of over 51.4 million passengers and around 700,000 tons of goods every year and is the first in Italy in terms of passenger volume and cargo volume (the second Italian airport system is Rome with 44.4 million passengers in 2023). The Milan Malpensa Airport, with over 700 thousand tons, confirms the national leadership, processing 70% of the country's air cargo.

- The intercontinental hub of Milan Malpensa Airport (MXP) is Italy's second-busiest airport, after Rome Fiumicino Airport, with 24.1 million passengers served in 2023 and Italy's busiest for freight and cargo, handling about 700,000 tons of international freight in 2022. Malpensa Airport is the largest international airport in northern Italy, serving Lombardy, Piedmont and Liguria, as well as the Swiss Canton of Ticino. The airport is located 49 kilometres (30 mi) northwest of Milan, in the province of Varese next to the Ticino river dividing Lombardy and Piedmont. Malpensa airport is 9th in the world and 6th in Europe for the number of countries served with direct scheduled flights It is connected to Milan by the Malpensa Express railway service and by various bus lines. The airport is located inside the Parco naturale lombardo della Valle del Ticino, a nature reserve included by UNESCO in the World Network of Biosphere Reserves.
- Milan Linate Airport (LIN) is Milan's city airport, less than 8 km (5.0 mi) from central Milan, and is mainly used for domestic and short-haul international flights. Linate Airport is hub of ITA Airways together with Rome Fiumicino Airport and is connected to the centre of Milan via the M4 blue metro line. It served 8.6 million passengers in 2023 ranking as the 8th airport in Italy for passenger traffic.
- Milan Bergamo Airport (BGY) is mainly used for low-cost, charter and cargo flights. The airport is located in Orio al Serio, 3.7 km (2.3 mi) southeast of Bergamo and 45 km (28 mi) northeast of Milan. It is one of Ryanair's three main operating bases, along with Dublin Airport and London Stansted Airport. A bus service operated by ATB connects to the airport, about 10 minutes from the Bergamo railway station. It served 14.7 million passengers in 2023.
- The Brescia Airport (VBS) is mainly used for postal and cargo flights, but also welcomes scheduled national and international flights for passengers. Brescia Airport is the main sorting base for Poste Italiane's air mail: DHL and Poste Air Cargo postal and cargo flights depart and arrive every night. The airport also benefits from an intensification of freight traffic, thanks to a partnership agreement signed between the Poste Italiane and Amazon. Since November 2018, the airport has also become one of the main bases for cargo flights of the international courier DHL.

Lastly, Bresso Airfield is a general aviation airport, operated by Aero Club Milano. Since 1960 the airport mostly serves as a general aviation airfield for flying club activity, touristic flights and air taxi. It also hosts a base of the state helicopter emergency service Elisoccorso.

Ghedi Air Base is a base of the Italian Air Force in Ghedi, about 15 km (9.3 mi) from Brescia. It is home to the 6º Stormo of the Italian Air Force with the 102º Gruppo (Papero), the 154º Gruppo (Diavoli Rossi) and the 155º Gruppo (Le linci) equipped with the Tornado IDS. It is one of six active air bases in five European countries with B61 nuclear bombs in underground WS3 Weapon Storage and Security System inside aircraft shelters. and as of 2019 housed more than 40 nuclear weapons.

=== Rail ===
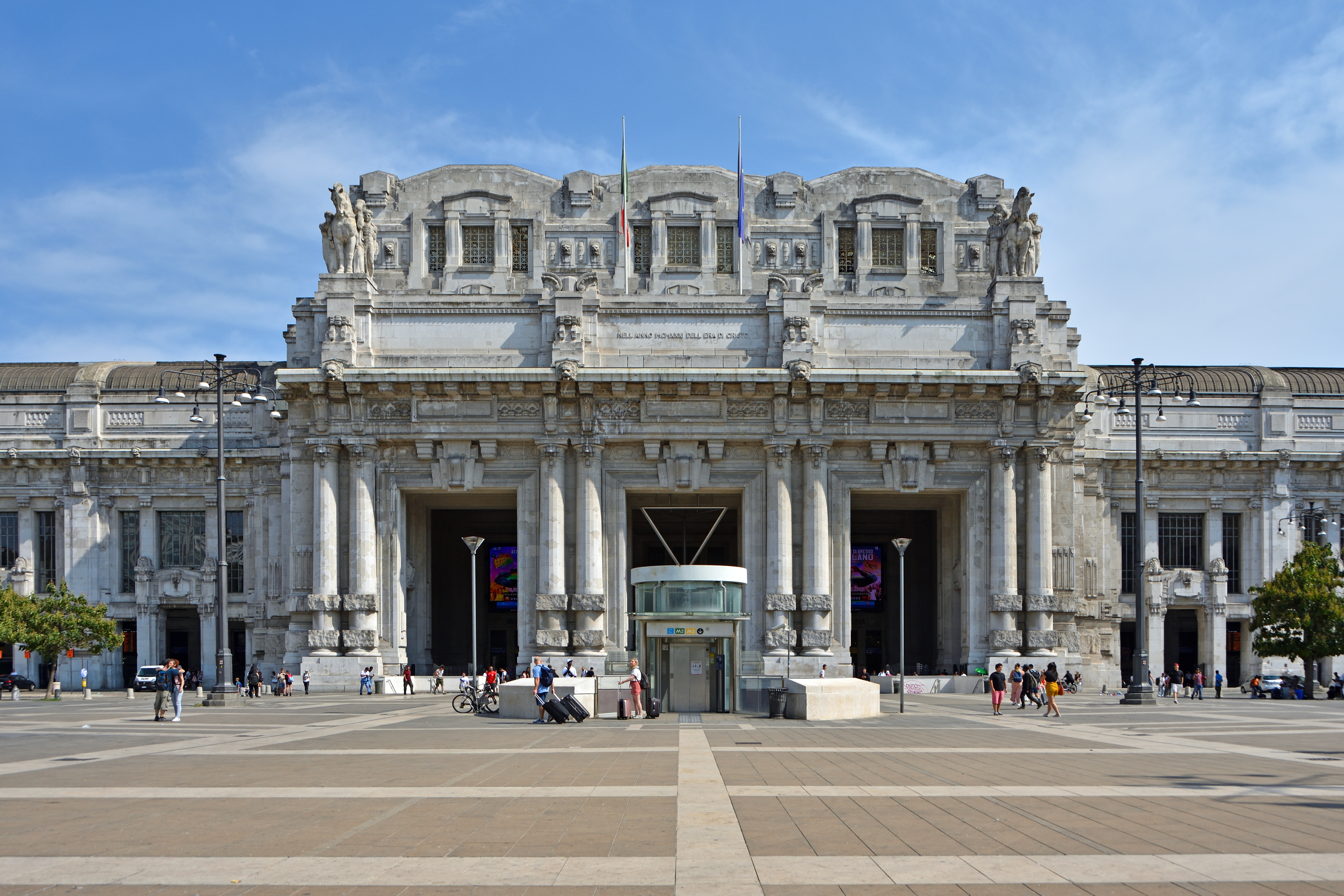
Milano Centrale railway station is the second-busiest railway station in Italy for passenger flow and the largest railway station in Europe by volume.

The Lombardy railway network has 428 stations and extends for approximately 2,000 km (1,200 mi). The network is mainly managed by RFI; 320 km (200 mi) of railway lines are under concession to Ferrovienord, while the Parma-Suzzara and Suzzara-Ferrara lines, although partially falling within Lombardy (55 km (34 mi) and 11 stations), are under concession to Ferrovie Emilia Romagna.

The national and international railway service is mainly ensured by Trenitalia and to a lesser extent by Nuovo Trasporto Viaggiatori, TGV and Deutsche Bahn. The regional territory has three high-speed lines: Turin–Milan high-speed railway, Milan–Bologna high-speed railway and Milan–Verona high-speed railway.

Milan is the core of Lombardy's regional train network. The regional service is the responsibility of Trenord, a company founded on 3 May 2011 and jointly owned by the Ferrovie Nord Milano and Trenitalia, which operates on both the RFI and Ferrovie Nord Milano networks, which have the Milan Passerby railway as their main interconnection hub. The Trenitalia Tper company operates on the FER network.

Milano Centrale railway station, with 110 million passengers per year, is the largest and eighth busiest railway station in Europe and the second busiest in Italy after Roma Termini. Milano Cadorna and Milano Porta Garibaldi stations are respectively the seventh and the eleventh busiest stations in Italy. Milano Centrale railway station is the largest railway station in Europe by volume.

As of September 2025, the Milan suburban railway service, operated by Trenord, comprises 12 S lines connecting the metropolitan area with the city centre, with possible transfers to all the metro lines. Most S lines run through the Milan Passerby railway, commonly referred to as "il Passante" and served by double-decker trains every 4/8 minutes in the central underground section.

=== Roads ===
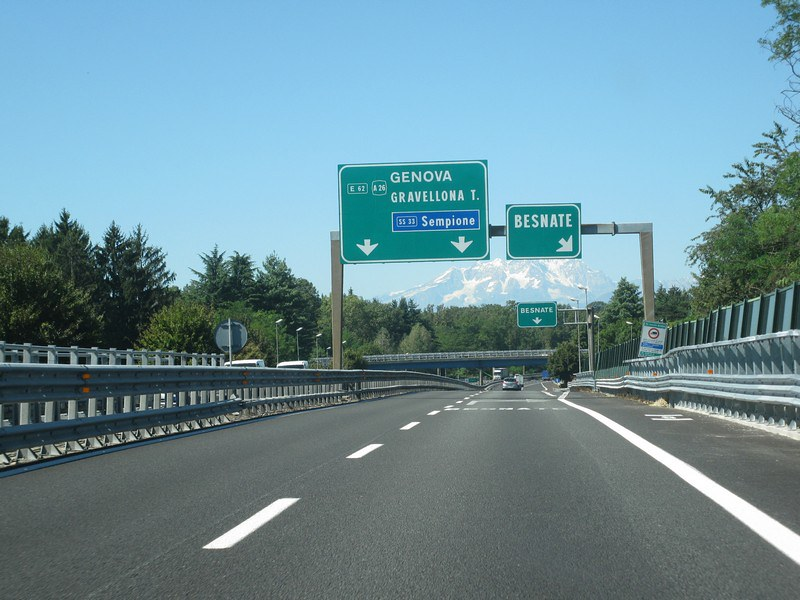
The Autostrada dei Laghi ("Lakes Motorway"; now parts of the Autostrada A8 and the Autostrada A9) near Besnate, the first motorway built in the world

The motorway network in Lombardy extends for 700 km (430 mi) to which approximately 1,000 km (620 mi) of state highways are added. The A4 motorway crosses the entire regional territory for 155 km (96 mi) from east to west, connecting the cities of Brescia, Bergamo, Monza and Milan. It is characterized by particularly intense traffic throughout the year and is flanked by the BreBeMi, which connects Brescia to the Milan external east ring road of Milan passing through Treviglio, rather than Bergamo.

The Milan ring road system is the largest in Italy, 74.4 km (46.2 mi) long in total and is made up of three ring roads: West, East and North. The A1, A7, A35, A8 and A9 connect Lombardy with Switzerland. The Autostrada dei Laghi ("Lakes Motorway"), connecting Milan to Lake Como and Lake Maggiore, and now parts of the A8 and A9 motorways, was devised by Piero Puricelli and was inaugurated in 1924. It is the first motorway built in the world. In the region there are also the A21, A22, A36 motorways, the A53 and A54 Pavia ring roads, the Bergamo ring road system, the Brescia south ring road, the Brescia west ring road, the Varese ring road system and the of Como ring road (A59).

=== Underground ===
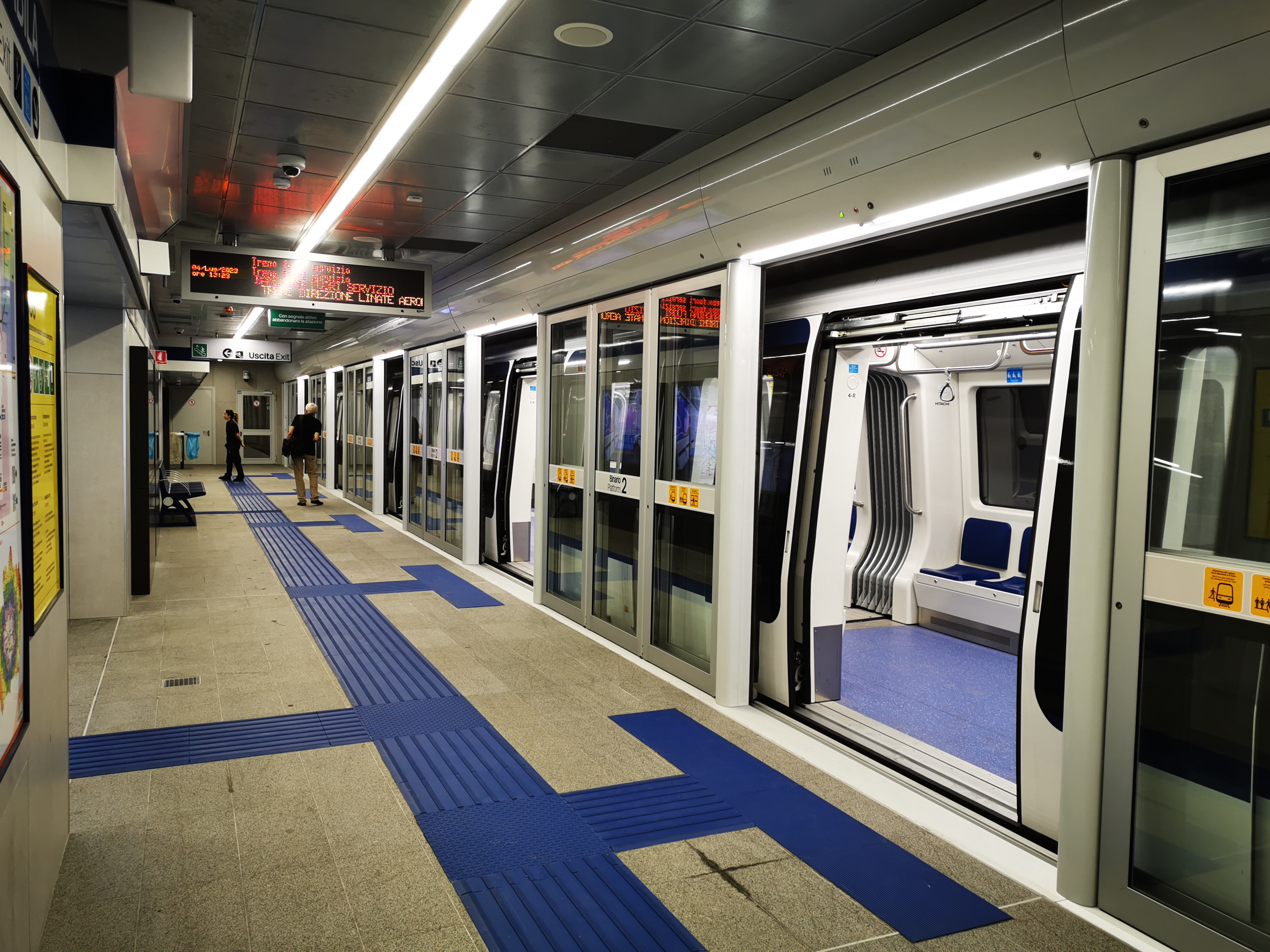
Milan Metro is the largest rapid transit system in Italy in terms of length, number of stations and ridership; and the fifth longest in the European Union and the eighth in the Europe.

The cities of Milan and Brescia have underground systems. Milan has the most extensive metro network in Italy, with 5 lines in operation (M1, M2, M3, M4 and M5). Milan Metro has a daily ridership of 1.15 million, the largest in Italy as well as one of the largest in Europe. It is operated by Azienda Trasporti Milanesi.

The architectural project of the Milan Metro, created by Franco Albini and Franca Helg, and the signs, designed by Bob Noorda, received the Compasso d'Oro award in 1964. Within the European Union it is the seventh largest network in terms of kilometres.

| Metro | Lines | Stations | Length | Notes |
|---|---|---|---|---|
| Milan Metro | 5 | 113 | 101 km (63 mi) | |
| Brescia Metro | 1 | 17 | 13.7 km (8.5 mi) | |

=== Navigation ===
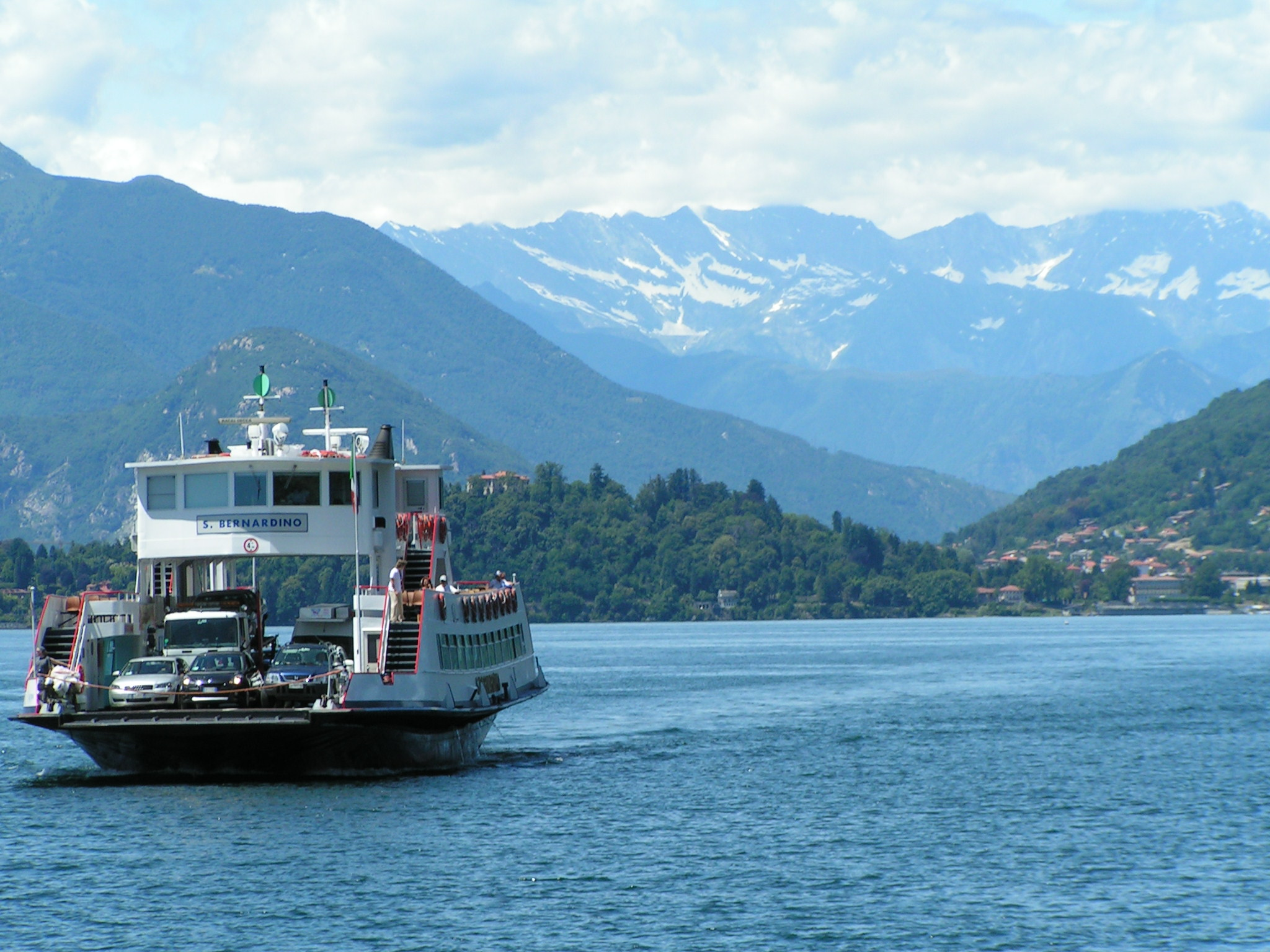
Car ferry across Lake Maggiore from Verbania (Piedmont) to Laveno (Lombardy). In the background Monte Rosa mountain chain and Verbania

Even though it is not surrounded by the sea, the region has a naval system that develops on the lakes, along the rivers and Navigli. The most important waterway system in Lombardy is part of the Po Valley-Veneto one which allows navigation from Casale Monferrato to Venice along the Po river. In this waterway system, the most important ports in Lombardy are those of Cremona and Mantua.

Navigation on the lakes has a predominantly tourist function and takes place regularly on scheduled routes. The scheduled shipping routes cover 460 km (290 mi) and are frequented by over 10 million travellers annually. The connections are managed by the Gestione Governativa Navigazione Laghi.

== Notable people ==
Virgil, Pliny the Elder, Ambrose, Gerolamo Cardano, Caravaggio, Claudio Monteverdi, Antonio Stradivari, Cesare Beccaria, Alessandro Volta, Alessandro Manzoni, Angelo Maria Rossi, and popes John XXIII and Paul VI originated in the area of modern-day Lombardy.

== Twin regions ==
- (Mexico) Nuevo León
- (Russia) Leningrad Oblast

== See also ==
- 2017 Lombard autonomy referendum
- List of European regions by GDP
- San Bernardino (Crema)
