= Piccola Accademia di Montisi =

Music academy in Italy

Coordinates: 43°09′24.75″N 11°39′09.34″E

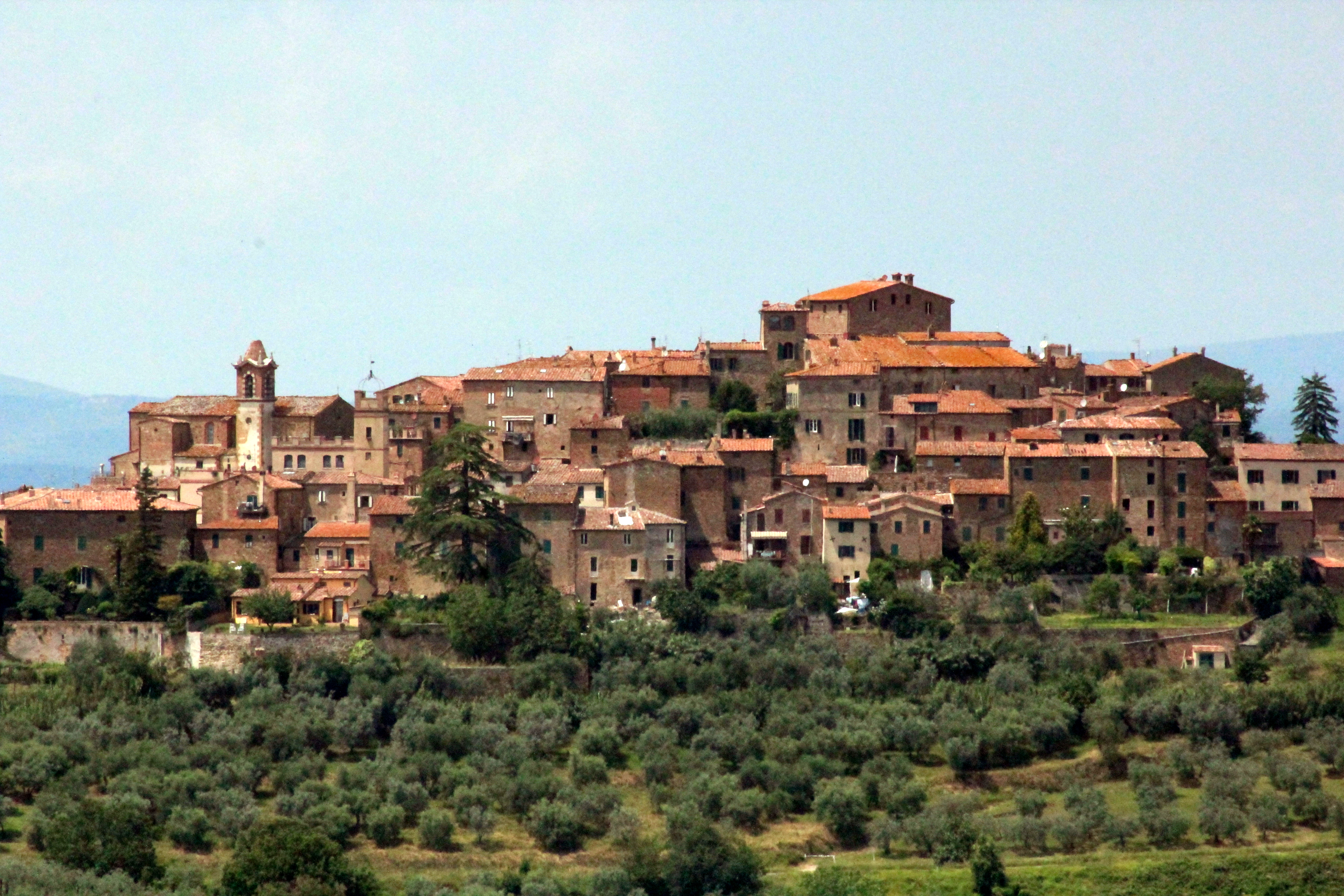
The Italian hill-top town Montisi, home of the Piccola Accademia di Montisi

The Piccola Accademia di Montisi is a music academy for harpsichord students and recent graduates located in Montisi, a hill town in the Province of Siena, in Southern Tuscany. It provides masterclasses with students playing on its collection of restored historic instruments and modern copies. It also holds an annual summer festival with concerts of harpsichord music and other works from the Baroque period which feature the instrument. The academy was founded in 2006 by harpsichord-maker and collector Bruce Kennedy who had been making harpsichords based on 18th-century models since the 1980s. He remains the academy's executive director.

The academy is based in the 13th-century Castello di Montisi. Its summer concerts are held in the Chiesa delle Sante Flora e Lucilla and other churches in the town. The inaugural summer festival, held from 18 to 21 July 2007, featured concerts by Gustav Leonhardt, Mahan Esfahani, and Skip Sempé and his Baroque ensemble Cappriccio Stravagante. The final event was a performance (the first in modern times) of Domenico Scarlattti's 1711 opera Tolomeo e Alessandro directed by Alan Curtis. Curtis served as the Piccola Accademia di Montisi's artistic advisor from its inception until his death in 2015. He was succeeded by Skip Sempé.
