= Anthimus of Rome =

Christian priest and saint

Saint Anthimus of Rome
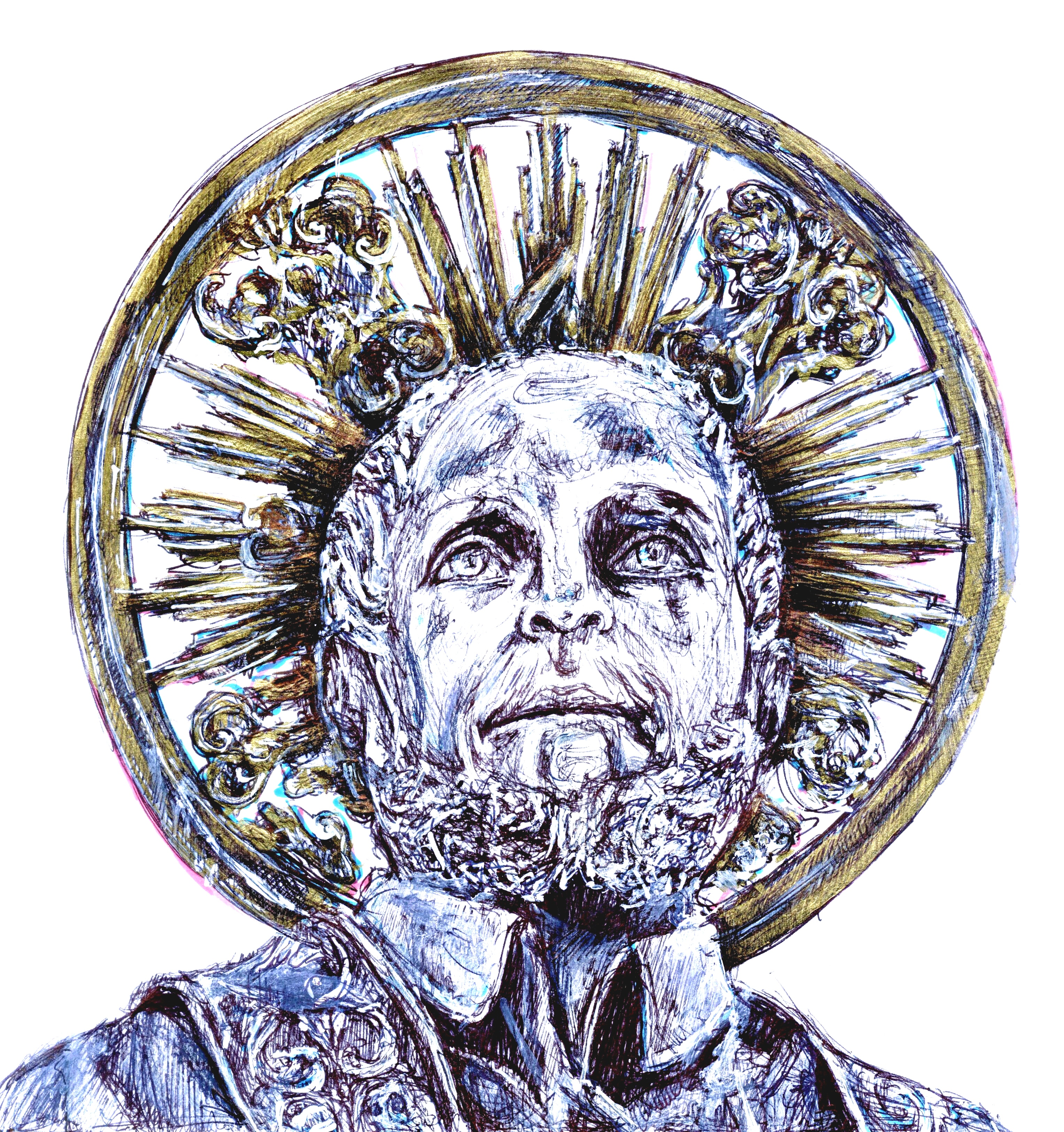
- Died: 303
- Feast: 11 May

Saint Anthimus of Rome, or Sant'Antimo in Italian (died 303), is a Christian saint. His life is largely composed of legend. He is said to have been born in Bithynia. A Christian priest, he was imprisoned for his beliefs at the time of the Emperors Diocletian and Maximian. His feast day is May 11.

== Legend ==
When the Roman governor of Bithynia, Pinianus, fell ill, his Christian wife Lucina (Lycinia), well known for her charity to imprisoned Christians and niece of the Emperor Gallienus, found Anthimus in prison. Anthimus converted Pinianus, and the governor was cured. Gratefully, Pinianus liberated all of the Christian prisoners in his province and allowed Anthimus to hide himself in the governor's villa on the Via Salaria.

Now based in Italy, Anthimus converted many to the Christian faith and countless miracles were attributed to him. He converted a priest of the god Silvanus and the pagan priest's entire family. Accused of having destroyed the simulacrum of Silvanus, he was thrown into the Tiber with a stone around his neck. His legend states that he was miraculously rescued by an angel, later recaptured, and then beheaded by order of the consul Priscus. He was buried in the oratory where he habitually prayed.

== Veneration ==
His tomb was first situated at Montemaggiore and was the object of pilgrimage and veneration. His body, during the time of Charlemagne, was transferred to Tuscany, near Montalcino, where St. Antimo's Abbey currently stands. A Bollandist historian of the 17th century speculated that Pope Hadrian I gave the relics of Saint Sebastian and Anthimus to Charlemagne, who then donated the relics to the abbey when it was founded. But this theory has not yet been verified.
