= Abbey of Sant'Antimo =

Benedictine monastery

Coordinates: 42°59′58.7″N 11°30′56.3″E

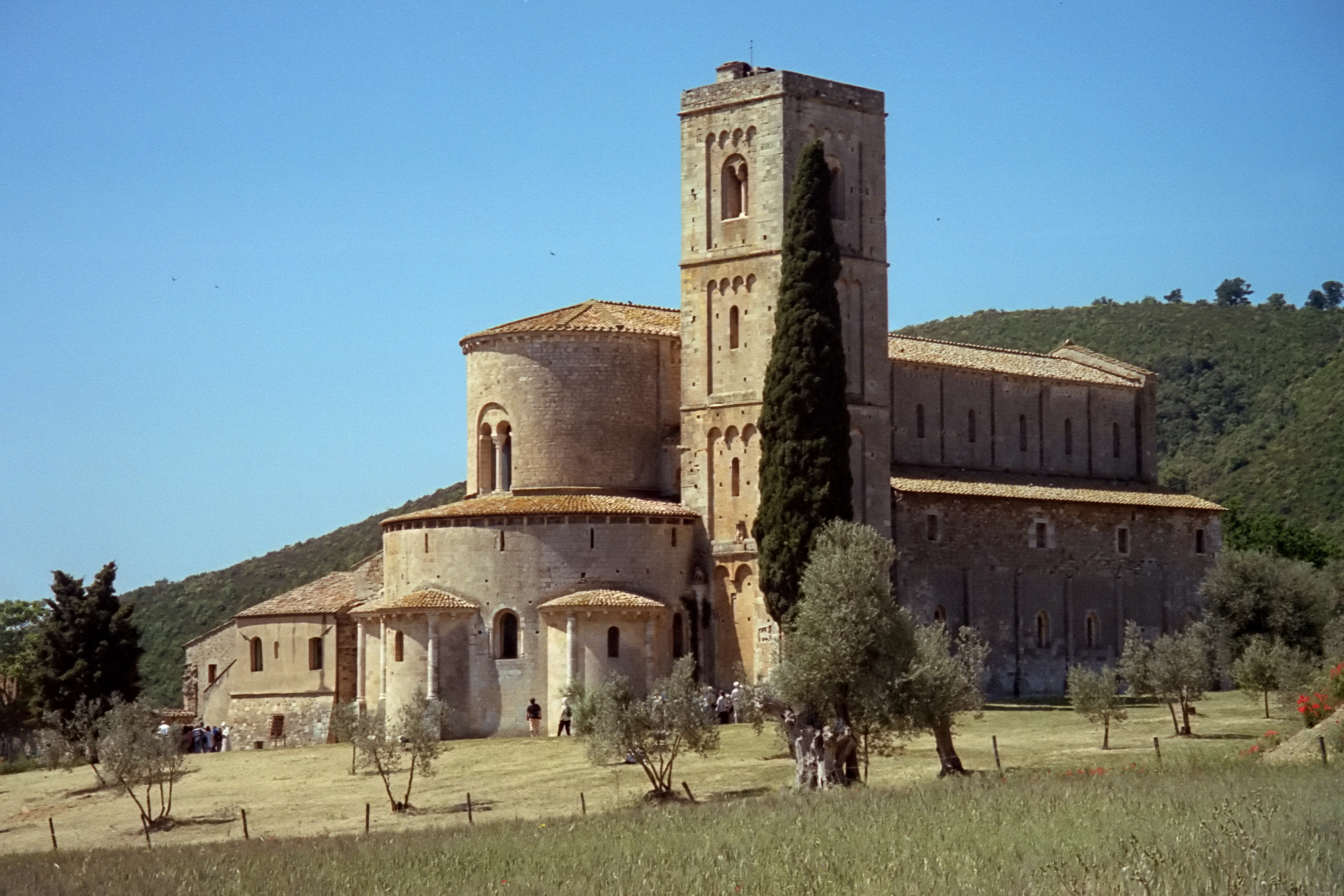
Abbey of Sant'Antimo, apse view

The Abbey of Sant'Antimo (Italian: Abbazia di Sant'Antimo) is a former Benedictine monastery located in Castelnuovo dell'Abate, in the comune of Montalcino, Tuscany, central Italy. It is approximately 10 km from Montalcino about 9 km from the Via Francigena, the pilgrim route to Rome. After many years of disuse, the abbey was reoccupied in 1992 by a small community of Premonstratensian Canons Regular. Since January 2016, the occupants are a community of monks of the Olivetan Benedictine order.

A tributary of the river Orcia, the Starcia, runs near the abbey.

== The name ==
The name of the abbey may refer to Saint Anthimus of Rome, whose relics were supposedly moved here during the late 8th century.

== History ==
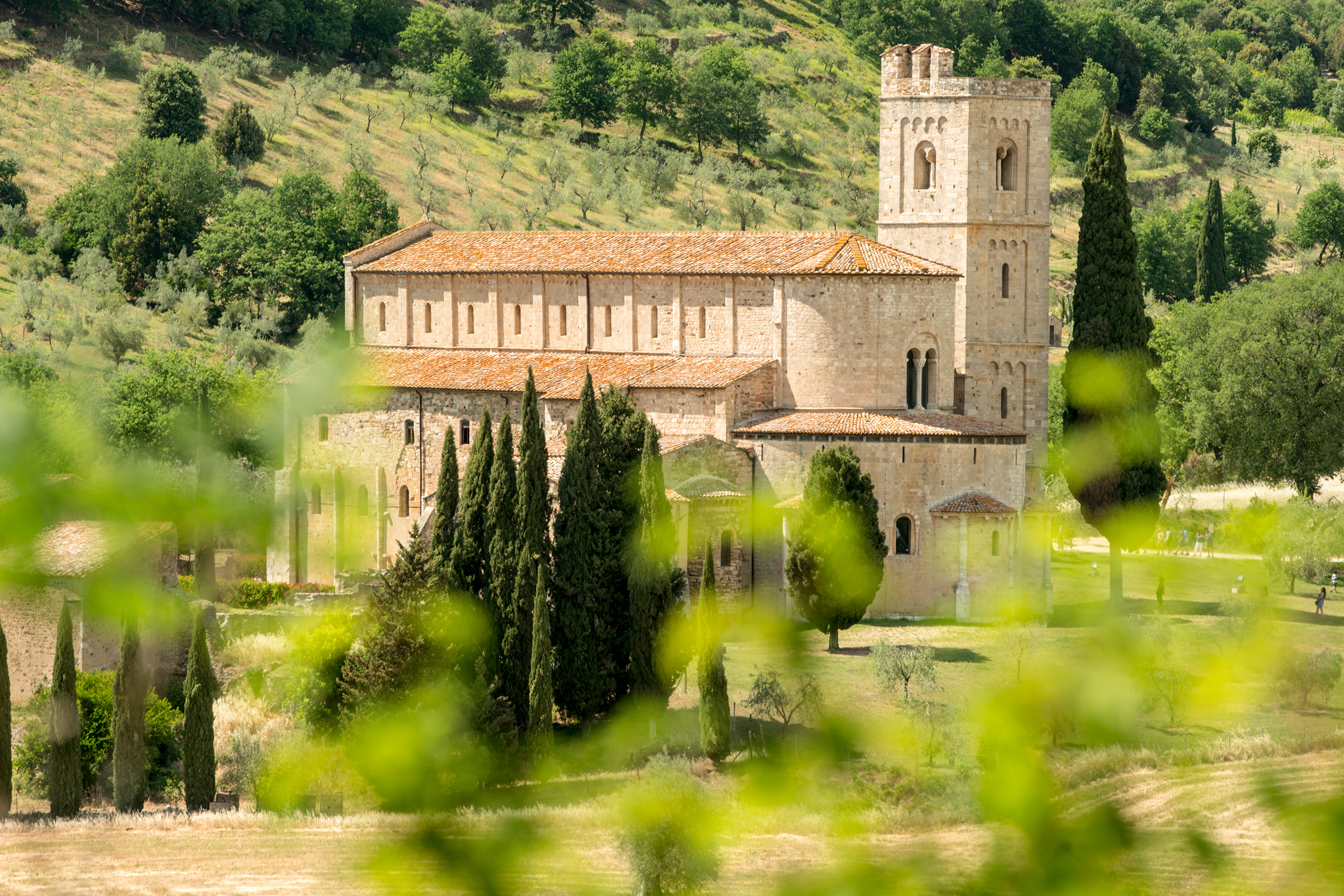
The abbey viewed from a distance

The origins of the abbey are obscure. Archeological investigation of the site is incomplete, but has yielded artifacts from Late Classical times. The foundation of the original Benedictine monastery dates to the time of Charlemagne. The various accounts of Charlemagne founding the abbey are without direct historical foundation; they first appear in a document of the emperor Henry III from 1051.

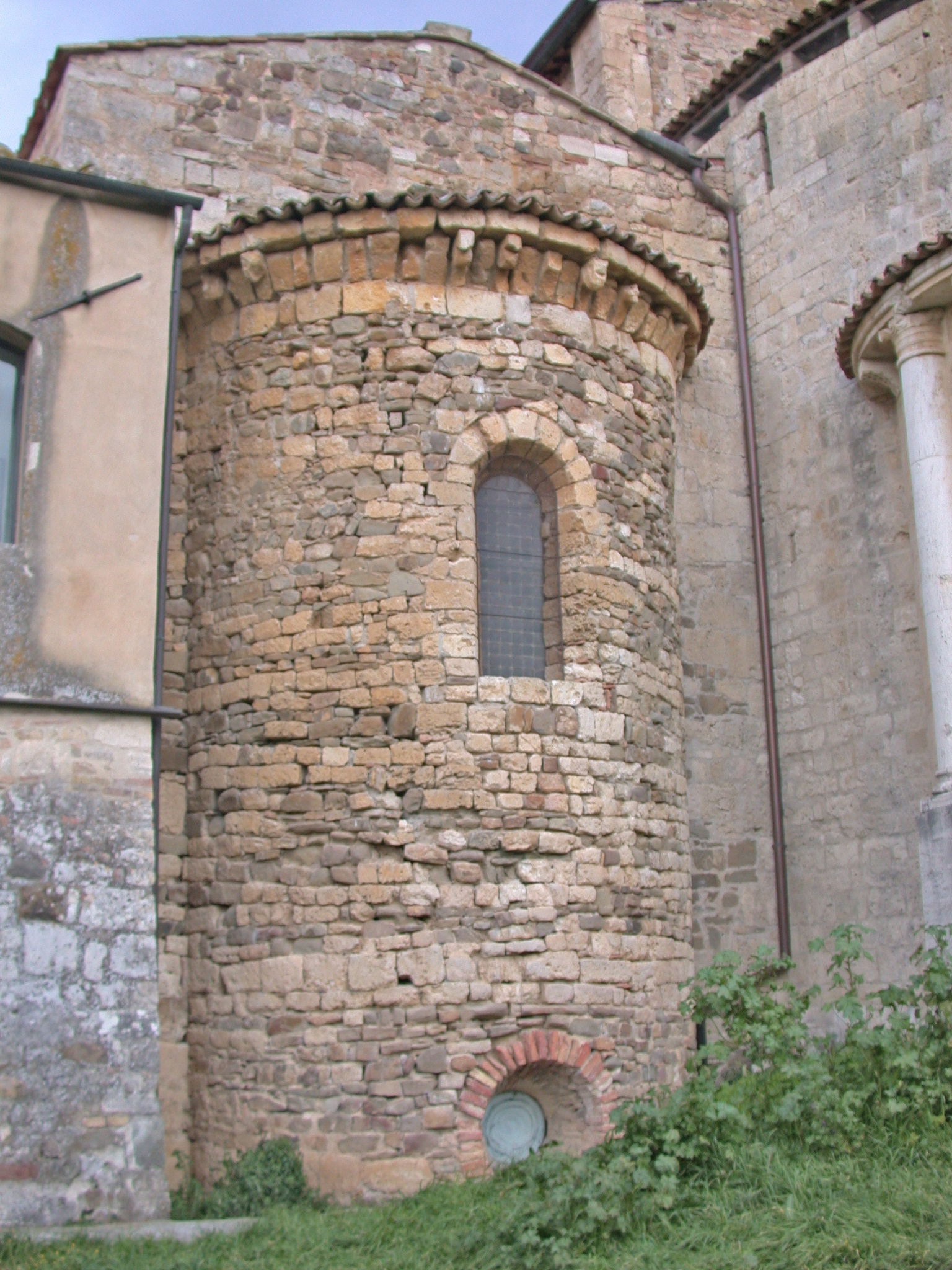
Apse of the Carolingian Chapel

The earliest document relating to the abbey is a land grant of Louis the Pious dated December 813, now in the Archivio di Stato of Siena. The abbot received full temporal powers in an imperial document of about 952. Following a bequest of Bernardo degli Ardengheschi, construction of the present church was begun before 1118, a date which is inscribed on the altar step and on a column to the left of it. Parts of the earlier structure remain visible in the crypt and in the so-called Cappella Carolingia, or Carolingian chapel.

This was the period of greatest power of the abbey, which had authority over 38 churches, from Pisa to Grosseto, and control of about 1000 mansi, or farm estates, throughout Tuscany. The most important possession of the abbey was the castle of Montalcino, which was the residence of the abbot.

In the mid-12th century, halted in its expansion northwards by Florence, Siena moved its attention to Montalcino. In 1145 the monks were forced to cede the castle of Radicofani the Sienese. In 1189 Pope Clement III placed the pieve of Montalcino under the bishop of Siena. Filippo Malavolti, podestà of Siena, attacked and partly destroyed Montalcino in 1200. An agreement of 1212 stated that the abbey had to hand over a quarter of its territories to Siena, including Montalcino.

In 1291 Pope Nicholas IV ordered the union of the abbey with the Guglielmites, a reformed branch of the Benedectines, in order to give back strength to the abbey. However, after another period of decay in the 15th century, Pope Pius II annexed St. Antimus to the new diocese of Montalcino-Pienza (1462), whose bishop was Pius' nephew. The abbey decayed to the point that in the 19th century it was used as stable. In the 1870s the Italian state restored it.

In 1992 the abbey became again an active monastery with the arrival of a new religious community of Canons Regular of the Order of Premontre.

== Architecture ==
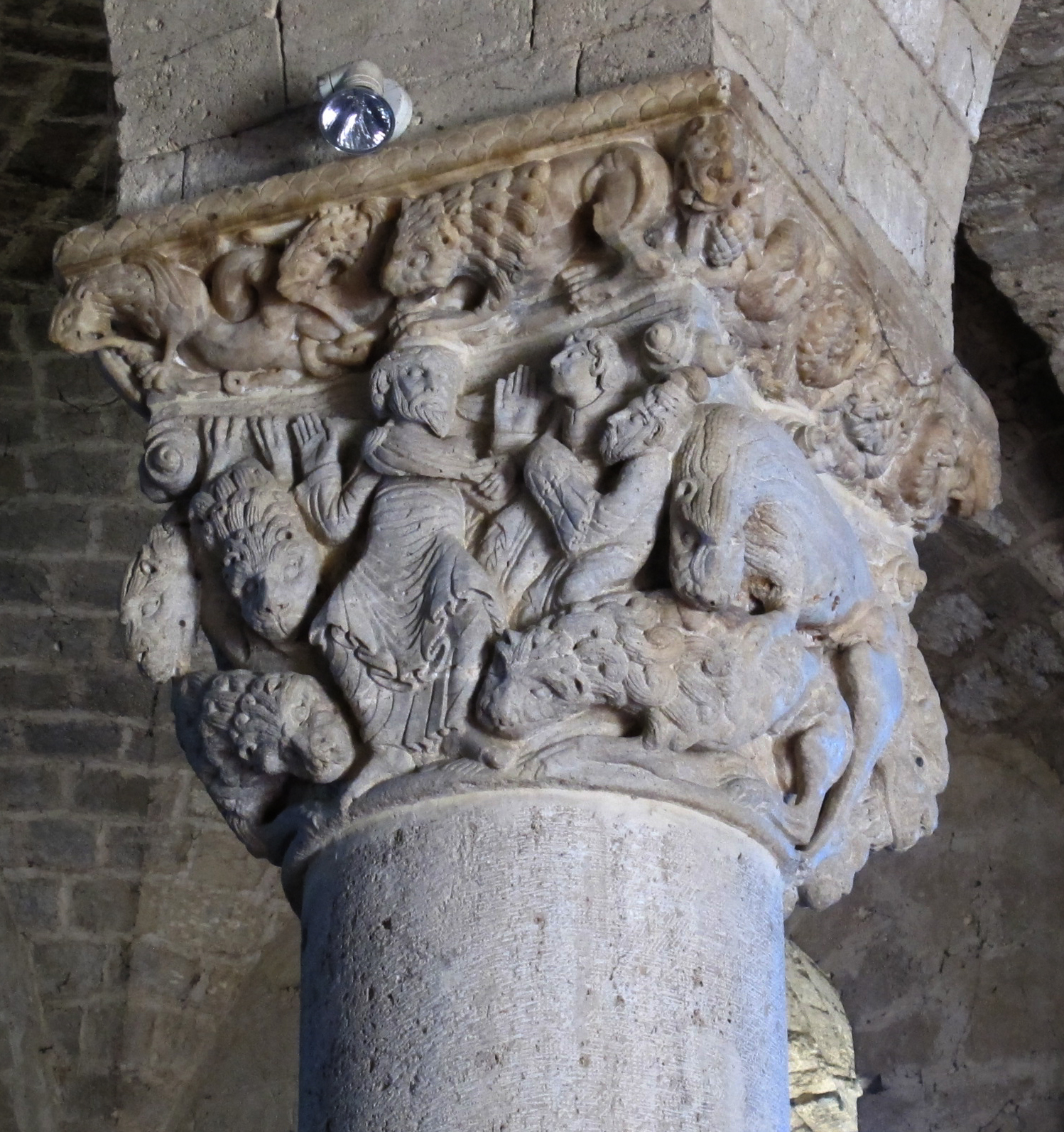
Capital with Daniel and the Lions

Of the Carolingian edifice, the apse (called Cappella Carolingia) and the portal, richly decorated with animal and vegetable motifs, are visible. The Carolingian chapel has frescoes by Giovanni d'Asciano with stories of St. Benedict and currently acts as sacristy. Under the chapel is a crypt with a nave and two aisles divided by four columns.

The Sala Capitolare (Capitular Hall) is decorated with a triple mullioned window with richly decorated capitals. Typically French in inspiration is the ambulatory with radial chapels. In Italy this scheme is known only in Santa Trinità of Venosa and the Cathedrals of Acerenza and Aversa, all in southern Italy, and in Santa Maria of Piè di Chianti, Marche. The ambulatory housed the pilgrims to pray the Martyrium, the place where the Saint's relic are placed.

The aisles and the ambulatory are groin vaulted, while the nave has trusses. The nave, which is c. 20-m high, is divided into three sections: the huge arcades, the matronaeum and the chiaropiano (upper floor).

Notable is the so-called capital of "Daniel in the lions' den", work of the French Master of Cabestany. It shows Daniel praying between the hungry lions, and, on the other sides, the lions devouring the accusers.

The outer walls are made of alabaster; one can shine a light against the walls and see the light translated/reflected back out to the eye.
