= Orcia =

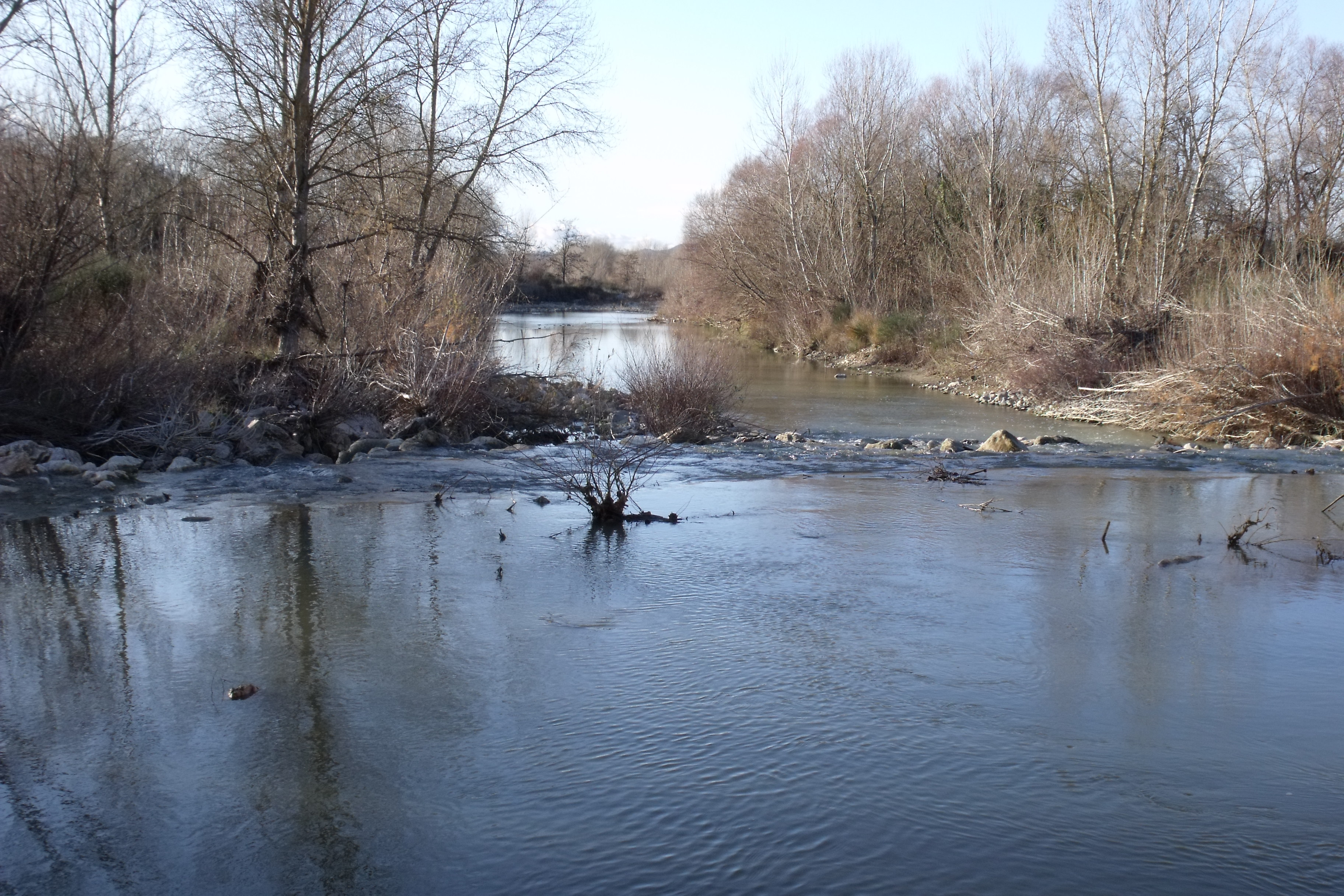
- The Orcia river at Sant'Angelo Scalo

Location
- Country: Italy
- Region: Tuscany
- Municipalities: Radicofani, Sarteano, Pienza, San Quirico d'Orcia, Castiglione d'Orcia, Montalcino, Castel del Piano, Cinigiano

Physical characteristics
- Source: Poggio Gello (Monte Cetona)
  - location: Radicofani, Tuscany, Italy
  - coordinates: 42°54′46.25″N 11°50′57.42″E
- Mouth: Ombrone
  - location: Monte Antico, Tuscany, italy
  - coordinates: 42°58′14.79″N 11°21′4.89″E
- Length: 57 km
- Basin size: 798 km²

Basin features
- Progression: Ombrone → Tyrrhenian Sea

The Orcia is a river in southern Tuscany, Italy, and a major tributary of the Ombrone River. It originates on Poggio Gello on Monte Cetona, in the municipality of Radicofani, and flows from east to west through the Val d'Orcia, a cultural landscape recognised as a UNESCO World Heritage Site.

The river traverses the municipalities of Radicofani, Sarteano, Pienza, San Quirico d'Orcia, Castiglione d'Orcia, and Montalcino in the province of Siena, as well as Castel del Piano and Cinigiano in the province of Grosseto, before joining the Ombrone near Monte Antico.
