= Sant'Angelo in Colle =

- Frazione
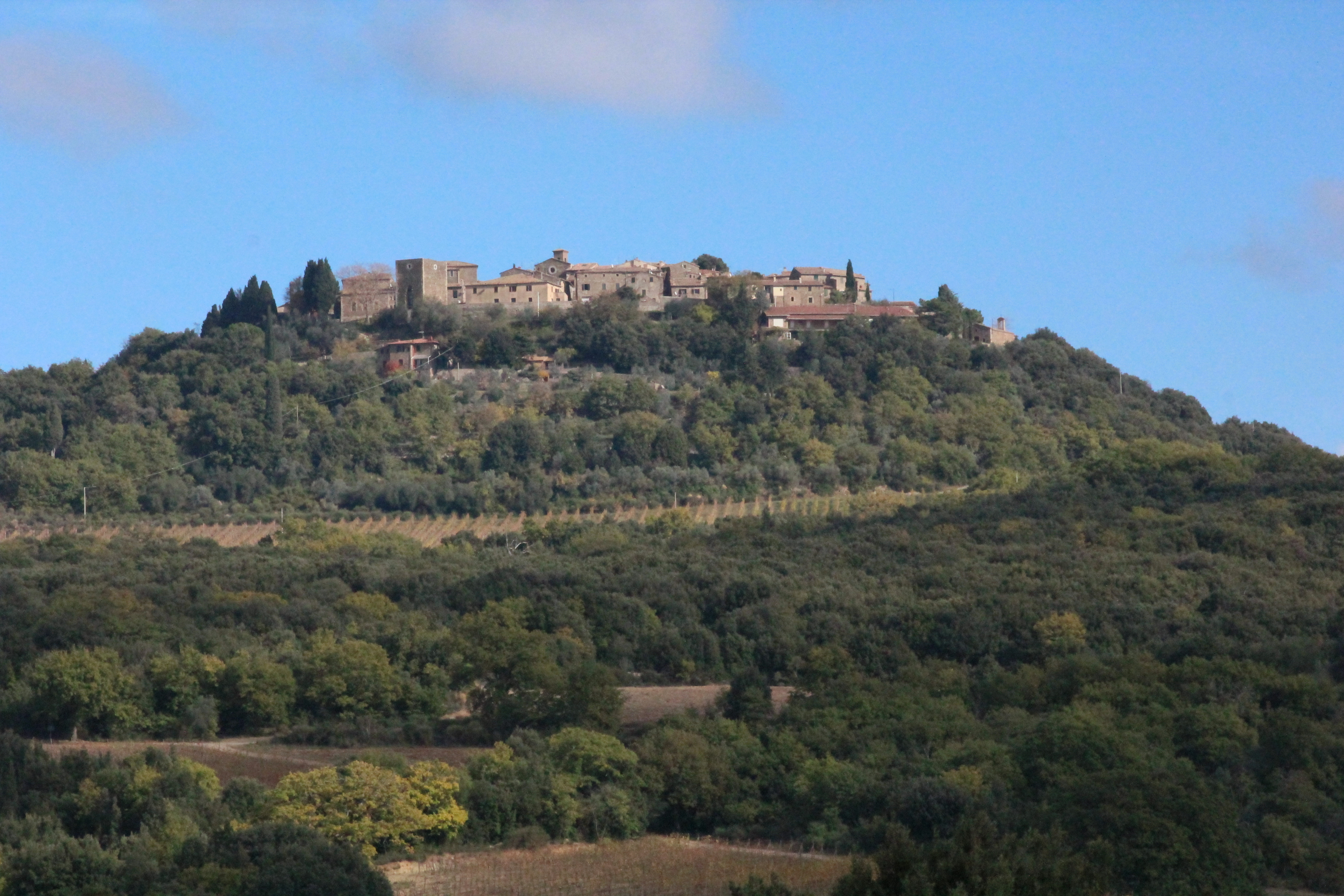
- View of Sant'Angelo in Colle

- Location of Sant'Angelo in Colle in Italy
- Coordinates: 42°59′38″N 11°27′37″E
- Country: Italy
- Region: Toscana
- Province: Siena
- Comune: Montalcino
- Elevation: 444 m (1,457 ft)

Population (2011 census)
  - Total: 204
- Demonym: Santangiolesi
- Time zone: UTC+1 (CET)
  - Summer (DST): UTC+2 (CEST)
- Postal code: 53024
- Dialing code: 0577
- Patron saint: San Michele Arcangelo
- Saint day: Third Sunday of May

Sant'Angelo in Colle is a village in Tuscany, central Italy, administratively a frazione of the comune of Montalcino, province of Siena. At the time of the 2011 census its population amounted to 204.

This medieval hamlet is located on a small hill approximately 8 km South of Montalcino.

== Main sights ==
- Pieve di San Michele Arcangelo (13th century)
- Church of Madonna della Misericordia (19th century)
- Church of San Pietro

== Economy ==
This small town's economy is based mainly on farming, it is in fact in this area the heart of the production of Brunello di Montalcino and several wineries are located here. A bank, a post office, two restaurants and a small grocery store are available.
