= Montelifré =

- Frazione
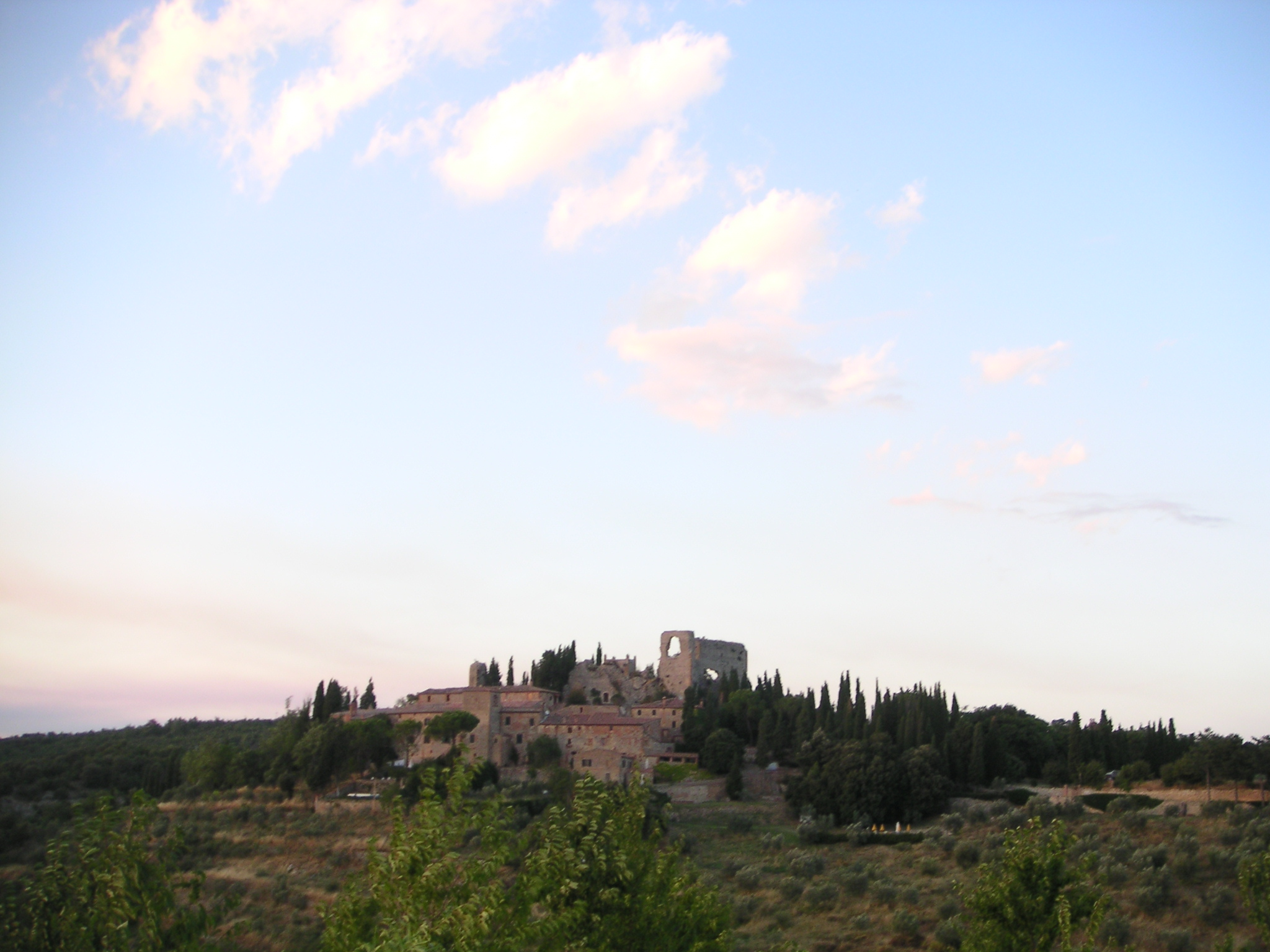
- View of Montelifré

- Location of Montelifré in Italy
- Coordinates: 43°10′12″N 11°39′44″E
- Country: Italy
- Region: Tuscany
- Province: Siena (SI)
- Comune: Montalcino
- Elevation: 450 m (1,480 ft)
- Time zone: UTC+1 (CET)
  - Summer (DST): UTC+2 (CEST)

Montelifré is a hamlet in Tuscany, central Italy, in the comune of Montalcino, province of Siena.

== Bibliography ==
- Emanuele Repetti (1839). "Montelifrè". Dizionario geografico fisico storico della Toscana. Vol. 3. Florence. p. 409.
