= Vergelle =

- Frazione
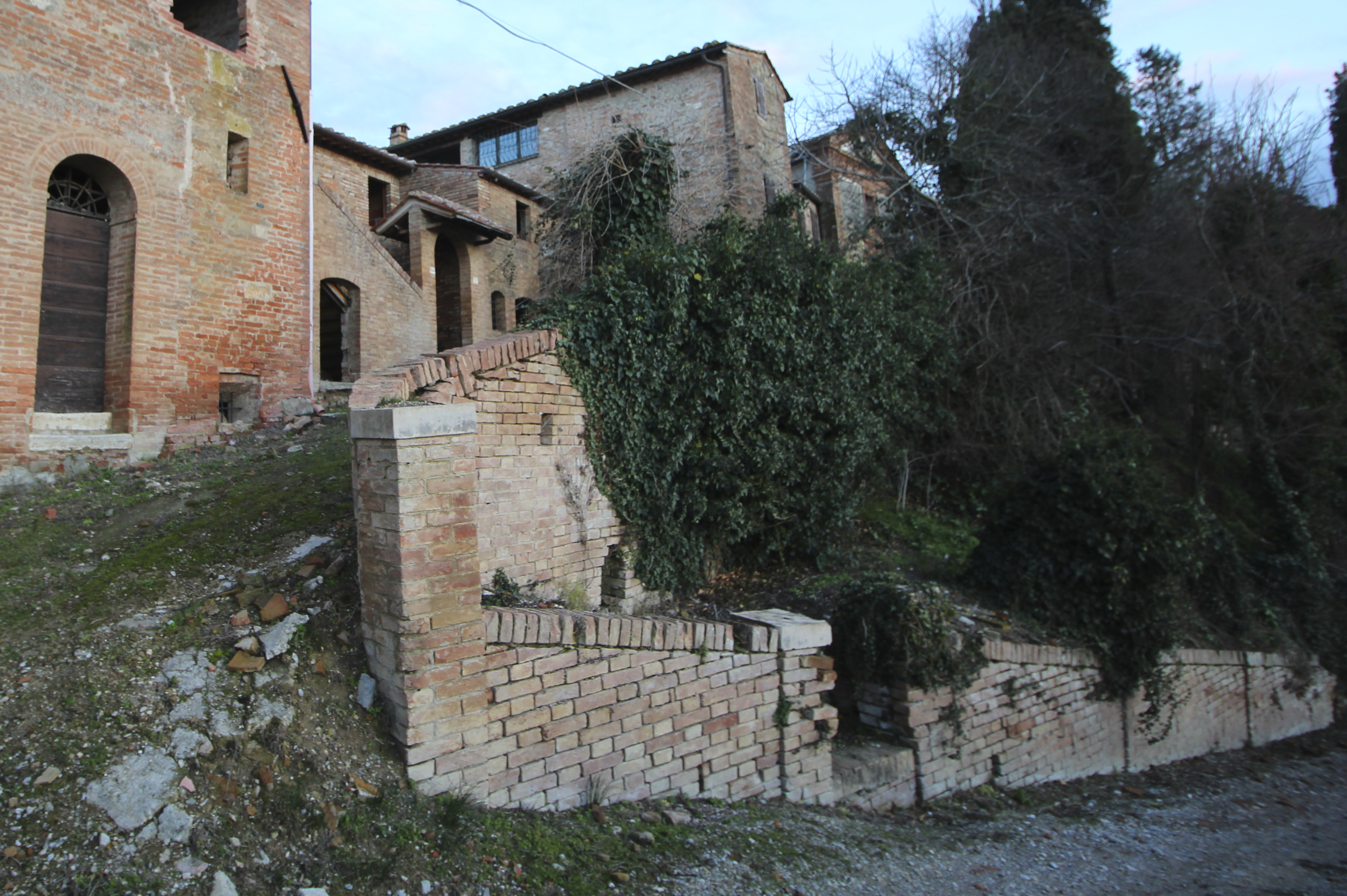

- Location of Vergelle in Italy
- Coordinates: 43°07′08″N 11°33′18″E
- Country: Italy
- Region: Tuscany
- Province: Siena (SI)
- Comune: Montalcino
- Elevation: 275 m (902 ft)
- Time zone: UTC+1 (CET)
  - Summer (DST): UTC+2 (CEST)

Vergelle is a village in Tuscany, central Italy, in the comune of Montalcino, province of Siena.

== Bibliography ==
- Emanuele Repetti (1843). "Vergelle". Dizionario geografico fisico storico della Toscana. Vol. 5. Florence. p. 690. Archived from the original on 2017-01-16.
