= Lucignano d'Asso =

- Frazione
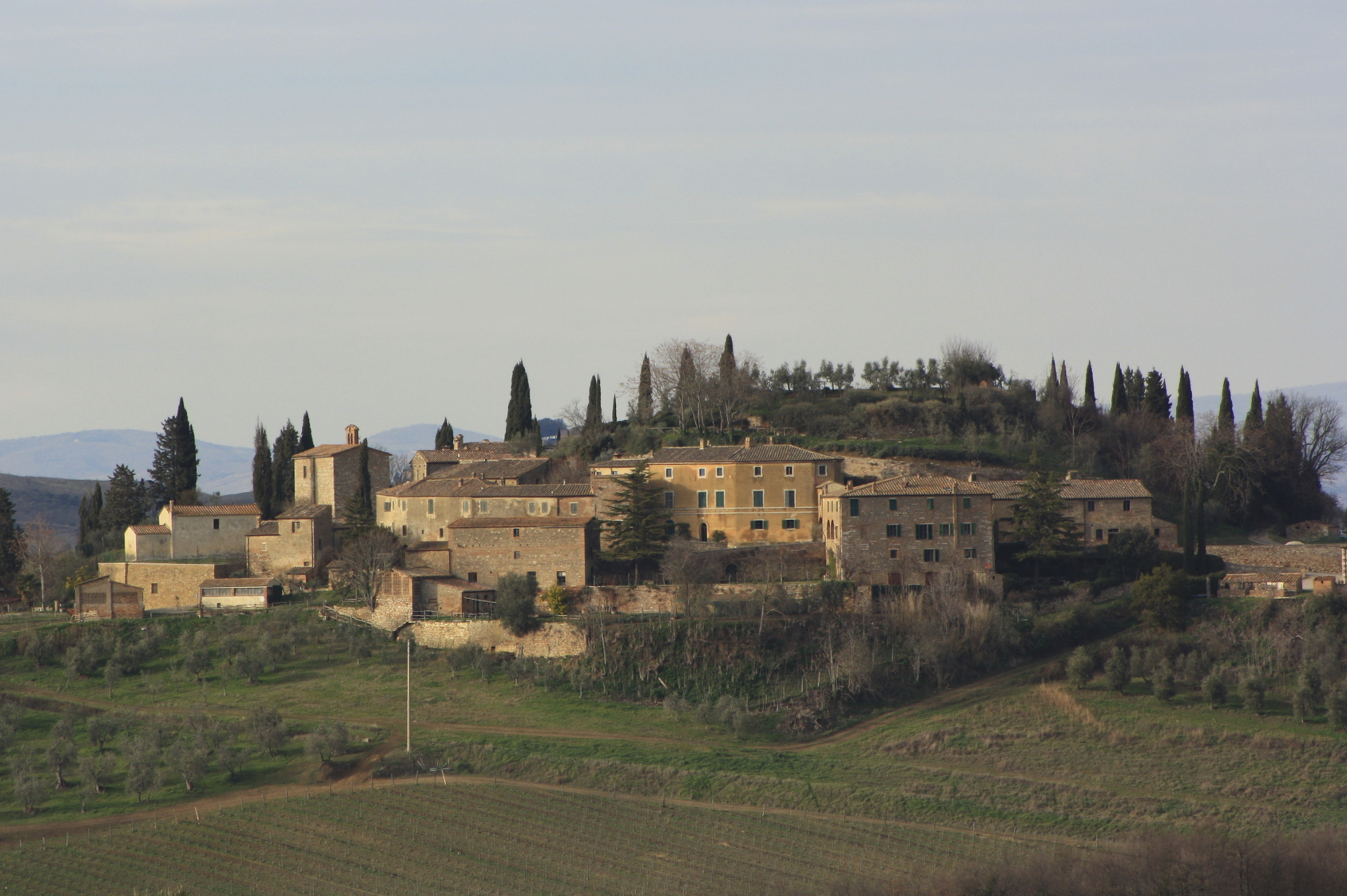
- View of Lucignano d'Asso

- Location of Lucignano d'Asso in Italy
- Coordinates: 43°07′25″N 11°35′30″E
- Country: Italy
- Region: Tuscany
- Province: Siena (SI)
- Comune: Montalcino
- Elevation: 380 m (1,250 ft)
- Demonym: Lucignanesi
- Time zone: UTC+1 (CET)
  - Summer (DST): UTC+2 (CEST)

Lucignano d'Asso is a village in Tuscany, central Italy, in the comune of Montalcino, province of Siena.

Lucignano d'Asso is about 47 km from Siena and 16 km from Montalcino.

== Bibliography ==
- Emanuele Repetti (1839). "Lucignano d'Asso". Dizionario geografico fisico storico della Toscana. Vol. 2. Florence. p. 916.
