= Monterongriffoli =

- Frazione
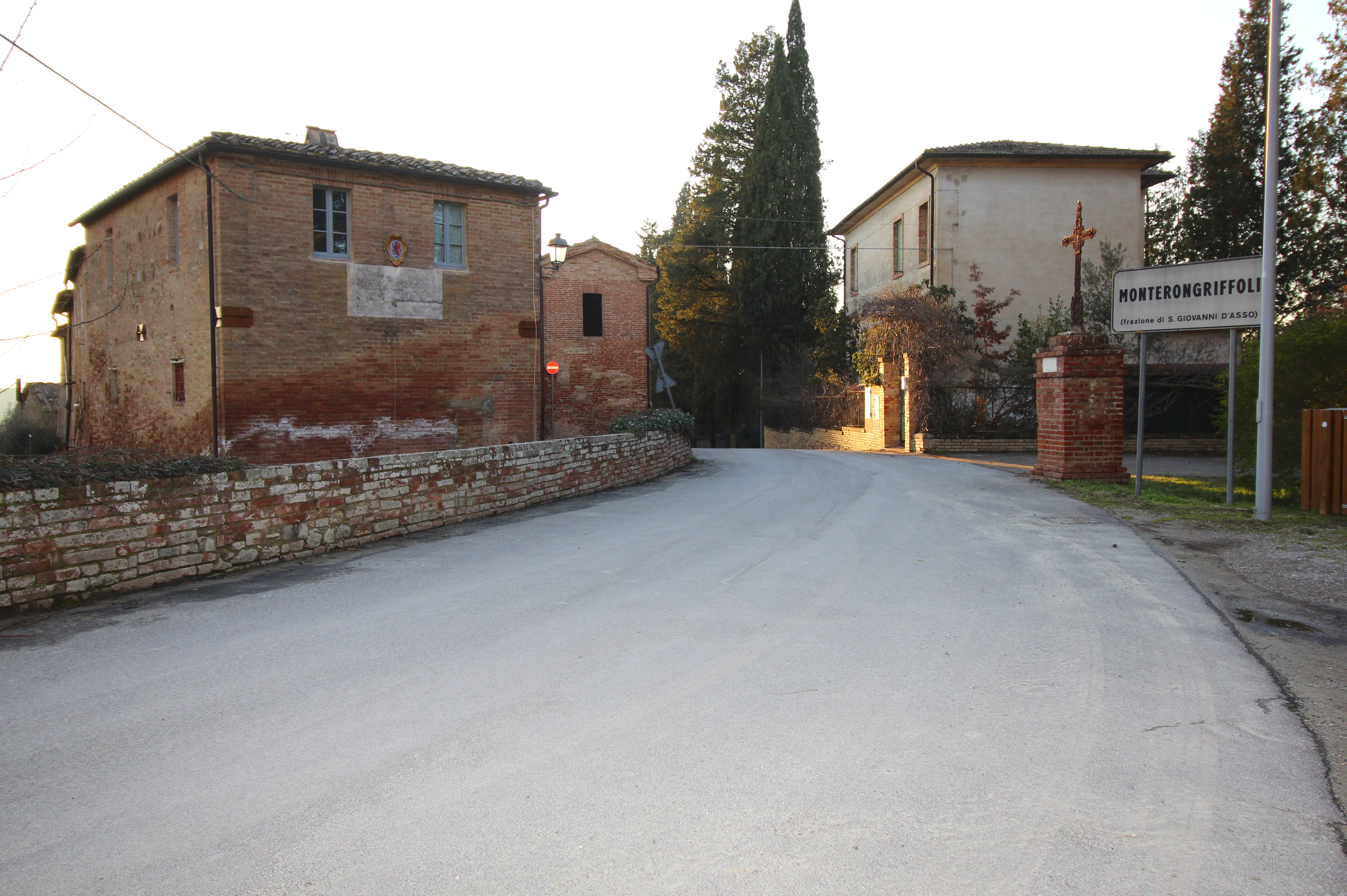

- Location of Monterongriffoli in Italy
- Coordinates: 43°08′41″N 11°34′00″E
- Country: Italy
- Region: Tuscany
- Province: Siena (SI)
- Comune: Montalcino
- Elevation: 276 m (906 ft)

Population (2011)
  - Total: 14
- Demonym: Monterongriffolesi
- Time zone: UTC+1 (CET)
  - Summer (DST): UTC+2 (CEST)

Monterongriffoli is a village in Tuscany, central Italy, located in the comune (municipality) of Montalcino, province of Siena. At the time of the 2001 census its population was 10.
