= Sant'Agostino, Montalcino =

Church in Montalcino, Italy

Coordinates: 43.0328°N 11.2921°E

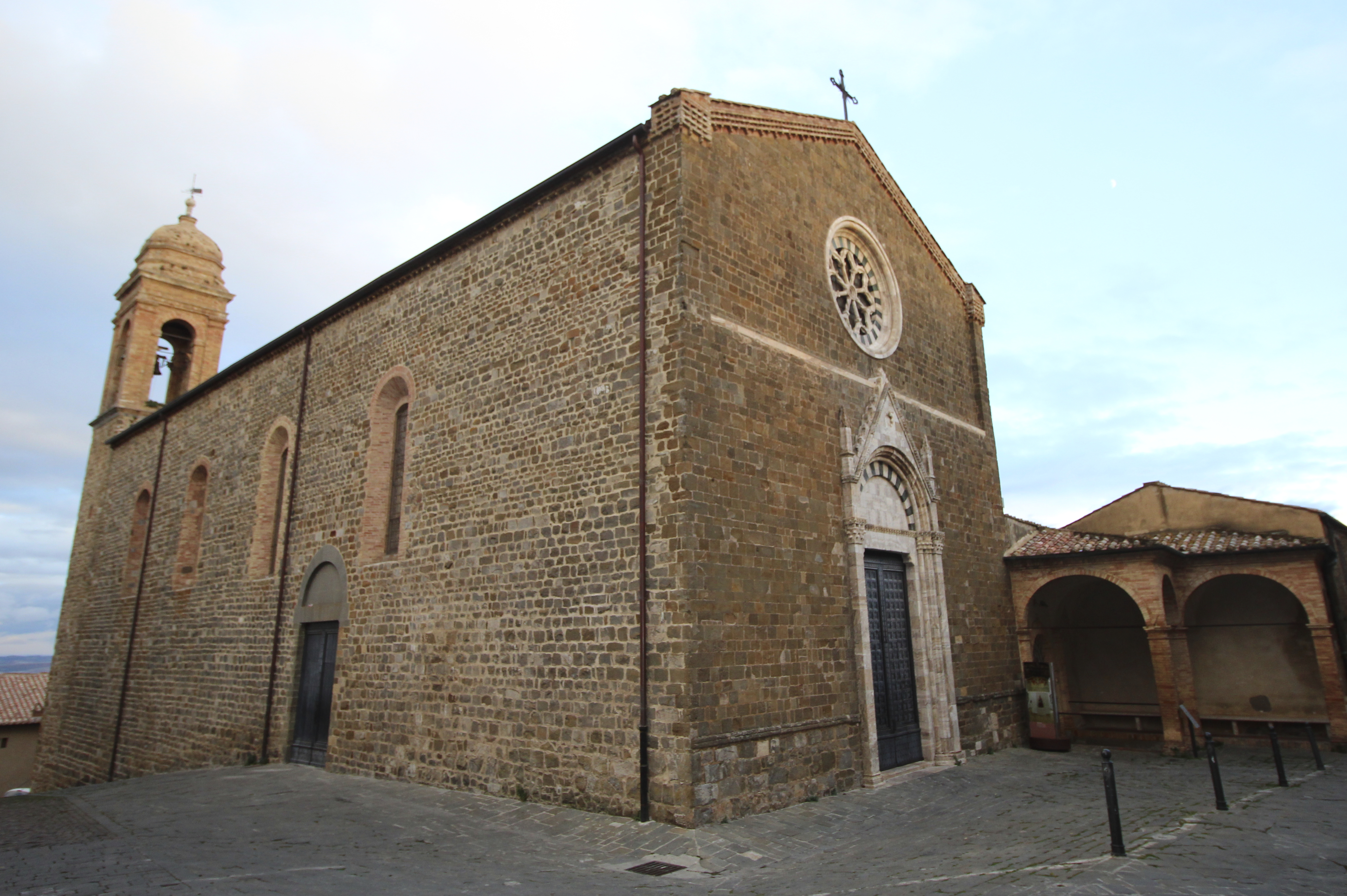
The church of Sant'Agostino

Sant'Agostino is a Gothic-style, Roman Catholic church in Montalcino, region of Tuscany, Italy.

== History ==
The church and adjacent convent were erected by the Augustinian order in 1227. The church was rebuilt in Gothic style in 1380. In 1782, the Augustinian convent was suppressed and the church and convent passed to the diocese, which used it for a seminary.

The convent in 2014 was used as a nursing home. One of the adjacent cloisters has been provided with a glass roof. The archdiocese, the region and commune, and a private foundation (Sindaco Silvio Franceschelli) have been involved in the restoration of the interiors, which contain 14th and 15th-century frescoes depicting the Passion of Christ and Life of St Anthony Abbot attributed to Bartolo di Fredi or followers.
