= Castelnuovo dell'Abate =

- Frazione
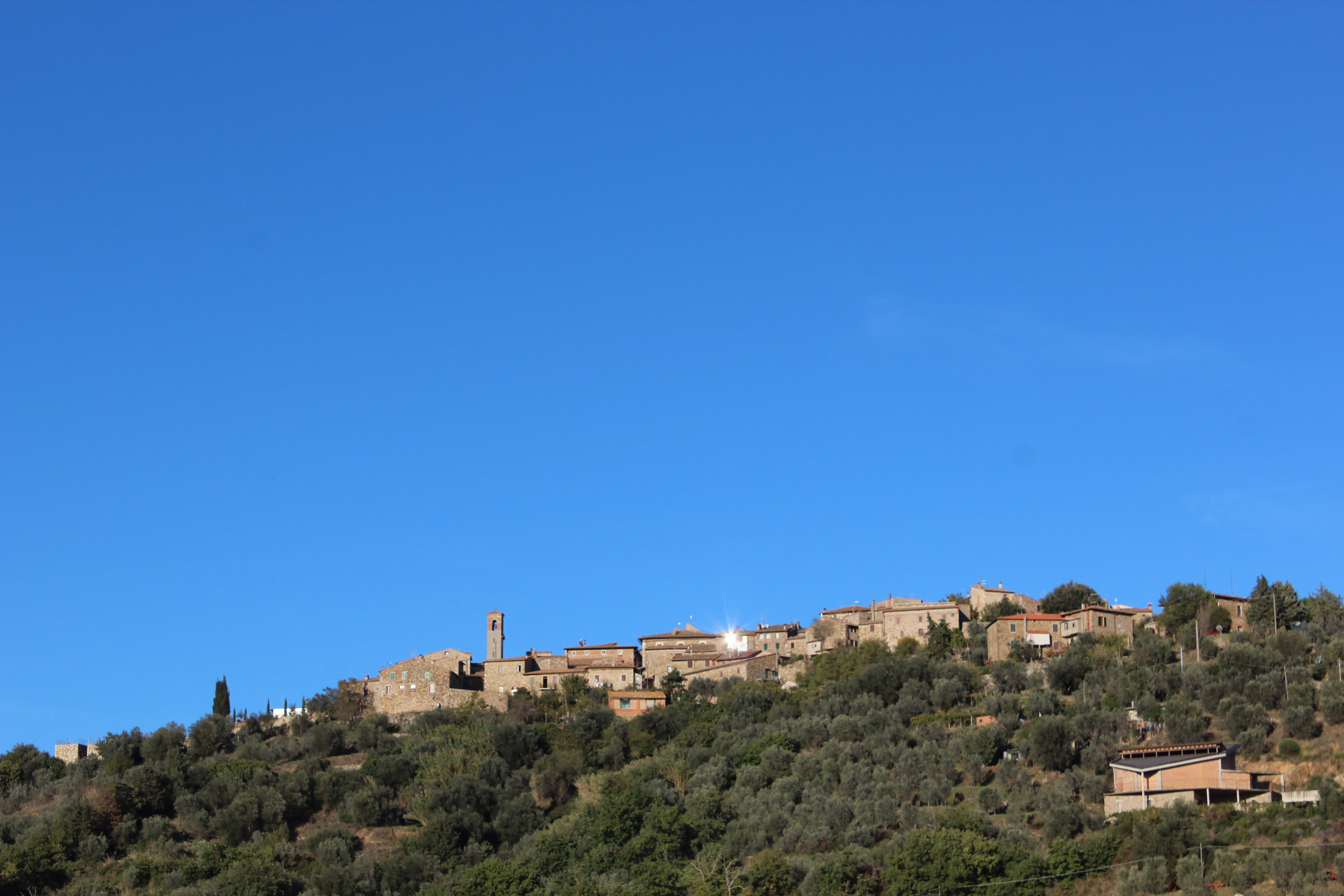
- View of Castelnuovo dell'Abate

- Location of Castelnuovo dell'Abate in Italy
- Coordinates: 42°59′41″N 11°31′1″E
- Country: Italy
- Region: Tuscany
- Province: Siena (SI)
- Comune: Montalcino
- Elevation: 385 m (1,263 ft)

Population (2011)
  - Total: 231
- Demonym: Castelnovesi
- Time zone: UTC+1 (CET)
  - Summer (DST): UTC+2 (CEST)

Castelnuovo dell'Abate is a village in Tuscany, central Italy, administratively a frazione of the comune of Montalcino, province of Siena. At the time of the 2001 census its population was 236.

== Main sights ==
- Santi Filippo e Giacomo (15th century), parish church of the village
- Abbey of Sant'Antimo
