= Camigliano, Montalcino =

Camigliano
- Frazione
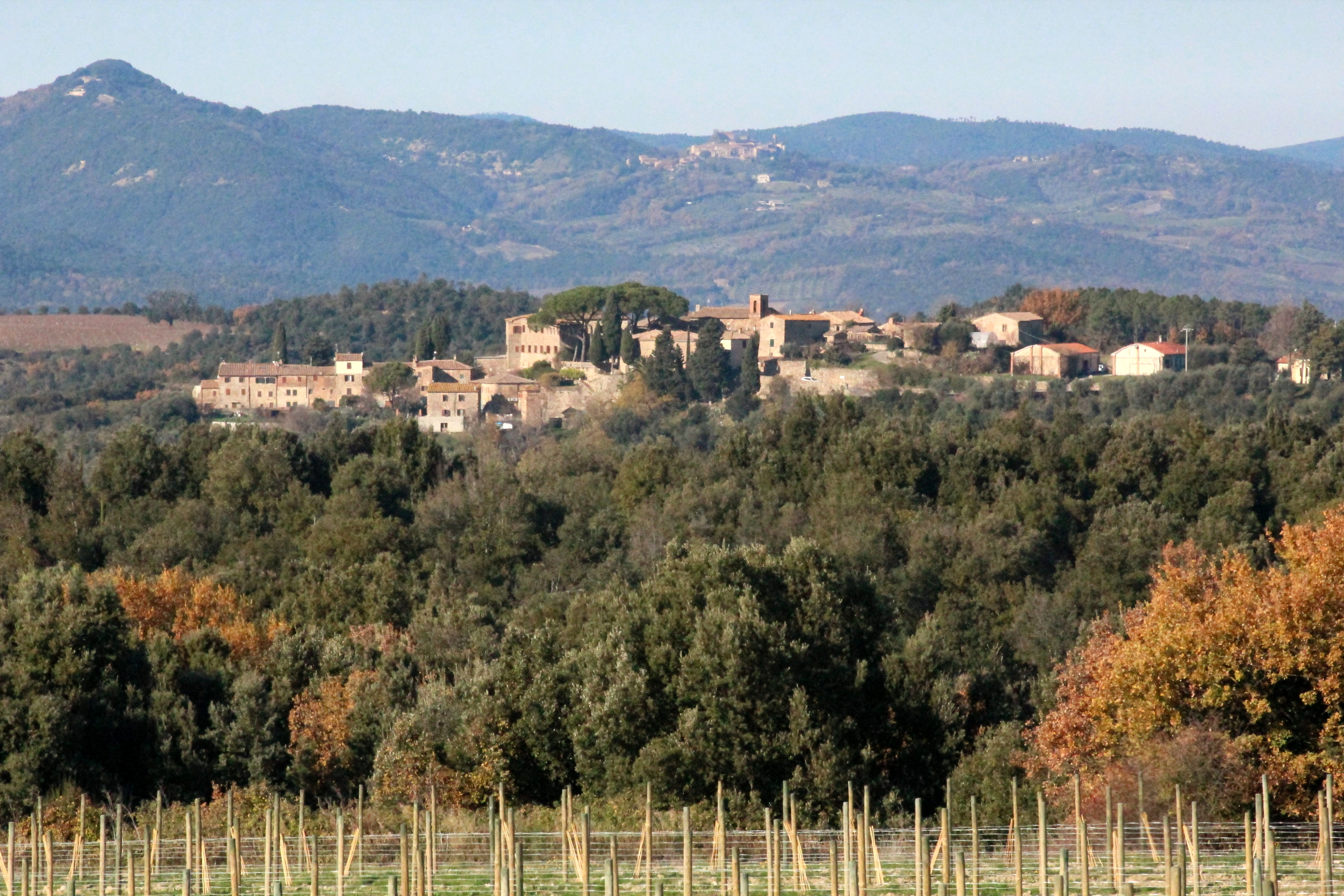
- View of Camigliano

- Location of Camigliano in Italy
- Coordinates: 43°00′26″N 11°23′50″E
- Country: Italy
- Region: Tuscany
- Province: Siena (SI)
- Comune: Montalcino
- Elevation: 234 m (768 ft)

Population (2011)
  - Total: 32
- Demonym: Camiglianesi
- Time zone: UTC+1 (CET)
  - Summer (DST): UTC+2 (CEST)

Camigliano is a village in Tuscany, central Italy, administratively a frazione of the comune of Montalcino, province of Siena. At the time of the 2001 census its population was 39.
