= Montisi =

- Frazione
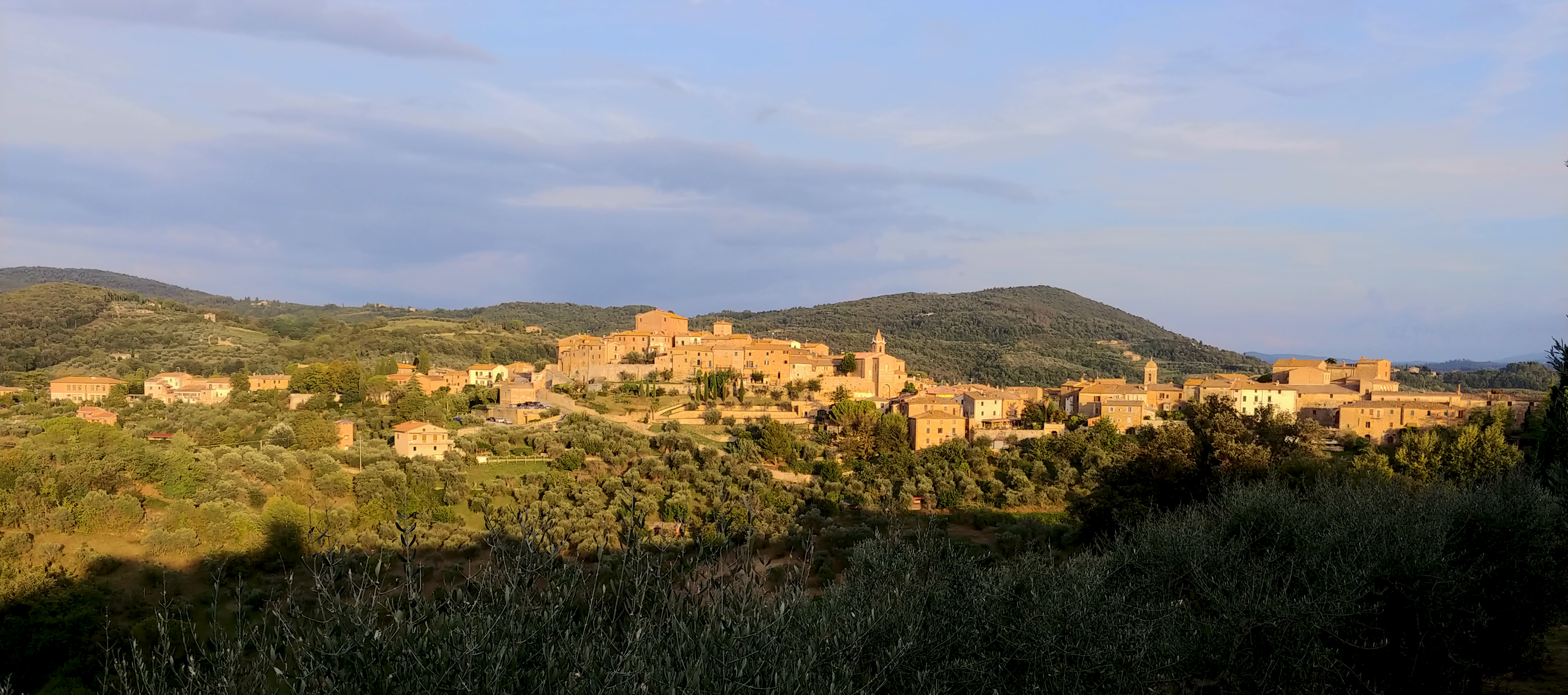
- View of Montisi

- Location of Montisi in Italy
- Coordinates: 43°09′24.75″N 11°39′09.34″E
- Country: Italy
- Region: Tuscany
- Province: Siena
- Comune: Montalcino
- Elevation: 413 m (1,355 ft)

Population (2011)
  - Total: 298
- Demonym: Montisani
- Time zone: UTC+1 (CET)
  - Summer (DST): UTC+2 (CEST)
- Postal code: 53020
- Patron saint: Madonna delle Nevi
- Saint day: 5 August

Montisi is an Italian village in the municipality of Montalcino, Province of Siena, Tuscany. It sits on a hill on the boundary between the Val d'Orcia and the Crete Senesi.

== The village ==
Montisi is divided into four contrade:

- Castello, or the area of the medieval village. The colors of its flag are white, yellow and blue;
- Piazza, located near the Castle. The colors of its flag are orange, white and green and in its coat of arms appear the "Colonna" (a little obelisk) and aspindle;
- San Martino, it's in the northeastern part of the village. The colors of its flag are red, white and blue;
- Torre, takes its name from the Tower of the Grange, which was destroyed in 1944. The colors of its flag are red, white and black.
