= Sant'Angelo Scalo =

- Frazione
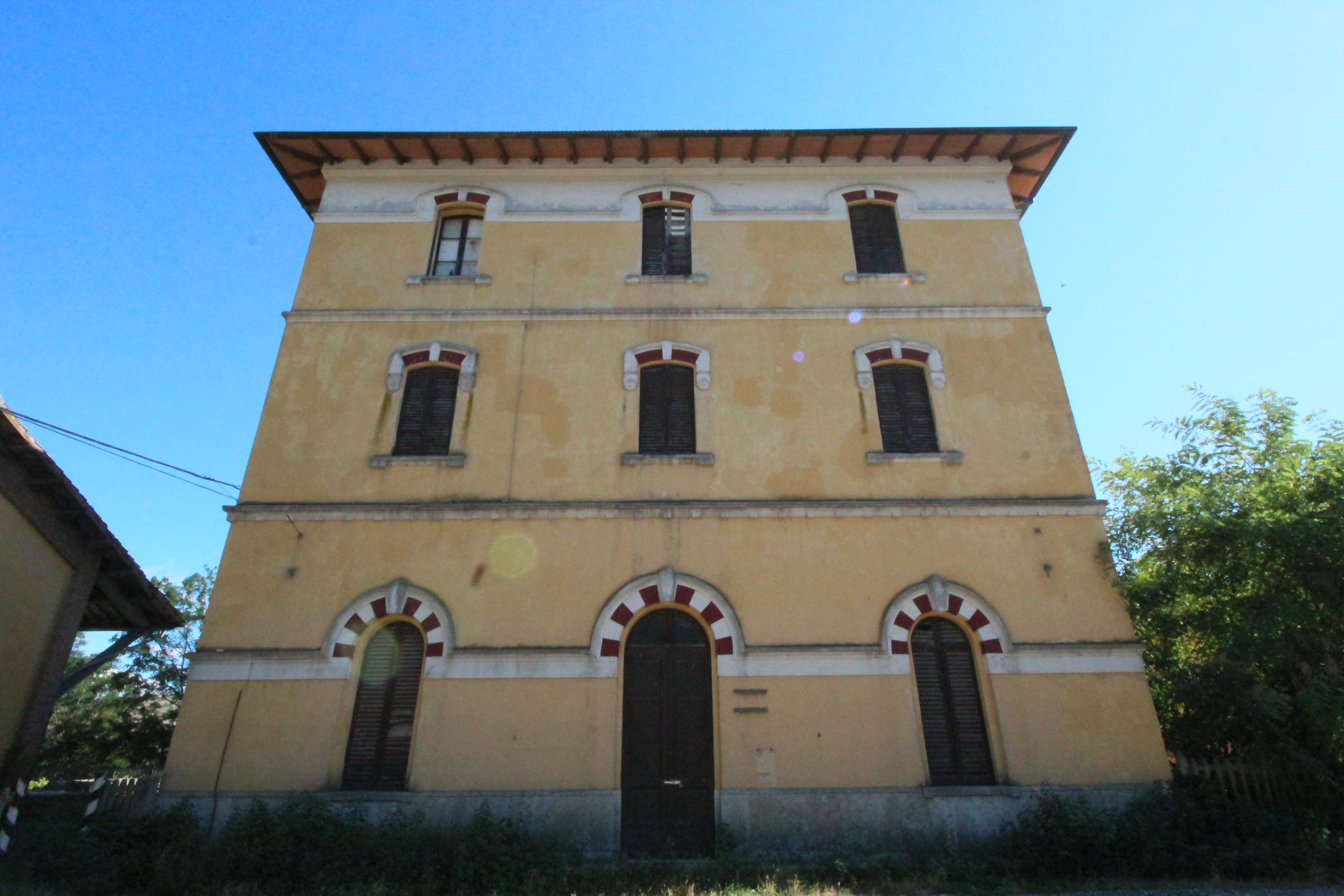
- Sant'Angelo Scalo train station

- Location of Sant'Angelo Scalo in Italy
- Coordinates: 42°57′57″N 11°25′31″E
- Country: Italy
- Region: Tuscany
- Province: Siena (SI)
- Comune: Montalcino
- Elevation: 106 m (348 ft)
- Time zone: UTC+1 (CET)
  - Summer (DST): UTC+2 (CEST)

Sant'Angelo Scalo is a village in Tuscany, central Italy, administratively a frazione of the comune of Montalcino, province of Siena. At the time of the 2001 census its population was 185.

Sant'Angelo Scalo is about 60 km from Siena and 15 km from Montalcino.
