= Montalcino =

- Comune
- Comune di Montalcino
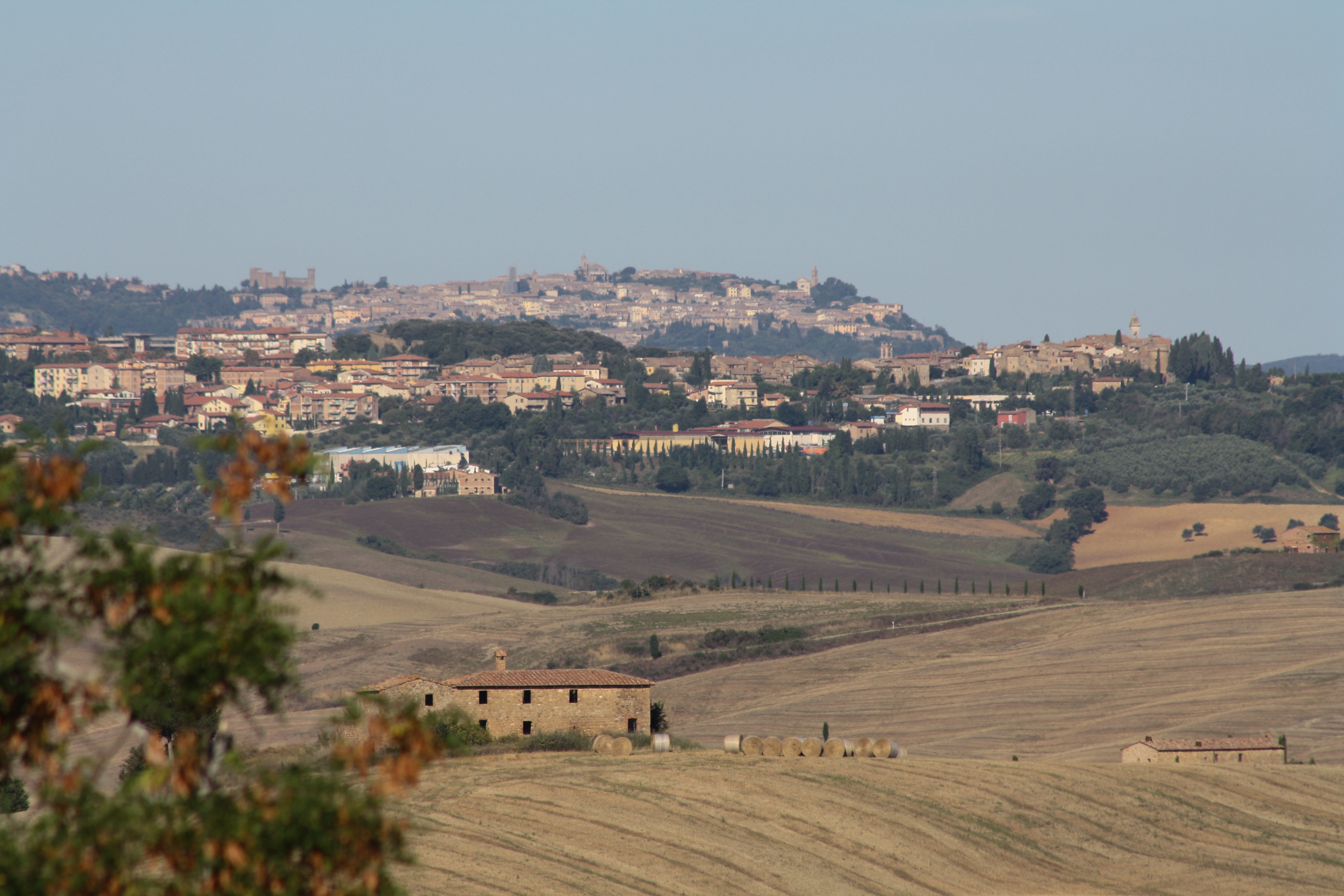

- Coat of arms

- Location within Italy Location within Tuscany
- Coordinates: 43°03′N 11°29′E
- Country: Italy
- Region: Tuscany
- Province: Siena (SI)
- Frazioni: Camigliano, Castelnuovo dell'Abate, Montisi, San Giovanni d'Asso, Sant'Angelo in Colle, Sant'Angelo Scalo, Torrenieri

Government
  - Mayor: Silvio Franceschelli (PD)

Area
  - Total: 310.31 km^{2} (119.81 sq mi)
- Elevation: 567 m (1,860 ft)

Population (2025)
  - Total: 5,563
  - Density: 17.93/km^{2} (46.43/sq mi)
- Demonym: Montalcinesi (or Ilcinesi)
- Time zone: UTC+1 (CET)
  - Summer (DST): UTC+2 (CEST)
- Postal code: 53024, 53028
- Dialing code: 0577
- Patron saint: Our Lady of Perpetual Help
- Saint day: 8 May
- Website: Official website

Montalcino (Italian pronunciation: [montalˈtʃiːno]) is a hill town and comune (municipality) in the province of Siena, Tuscany, central Italy.

The town is located to the west of Pienza, in Val d'Orcia. It is 42 kilometres (26 mi) from Siena and 110 kilometres (68 mi) from Florence. Monte Amiata is located nearby, on the border with the province of Grosseto.

== History ==
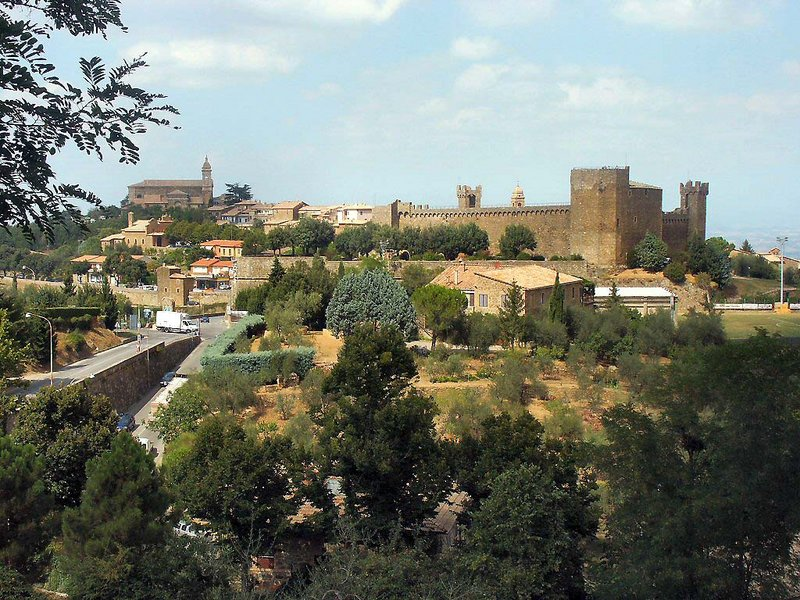
View of Montalcino.

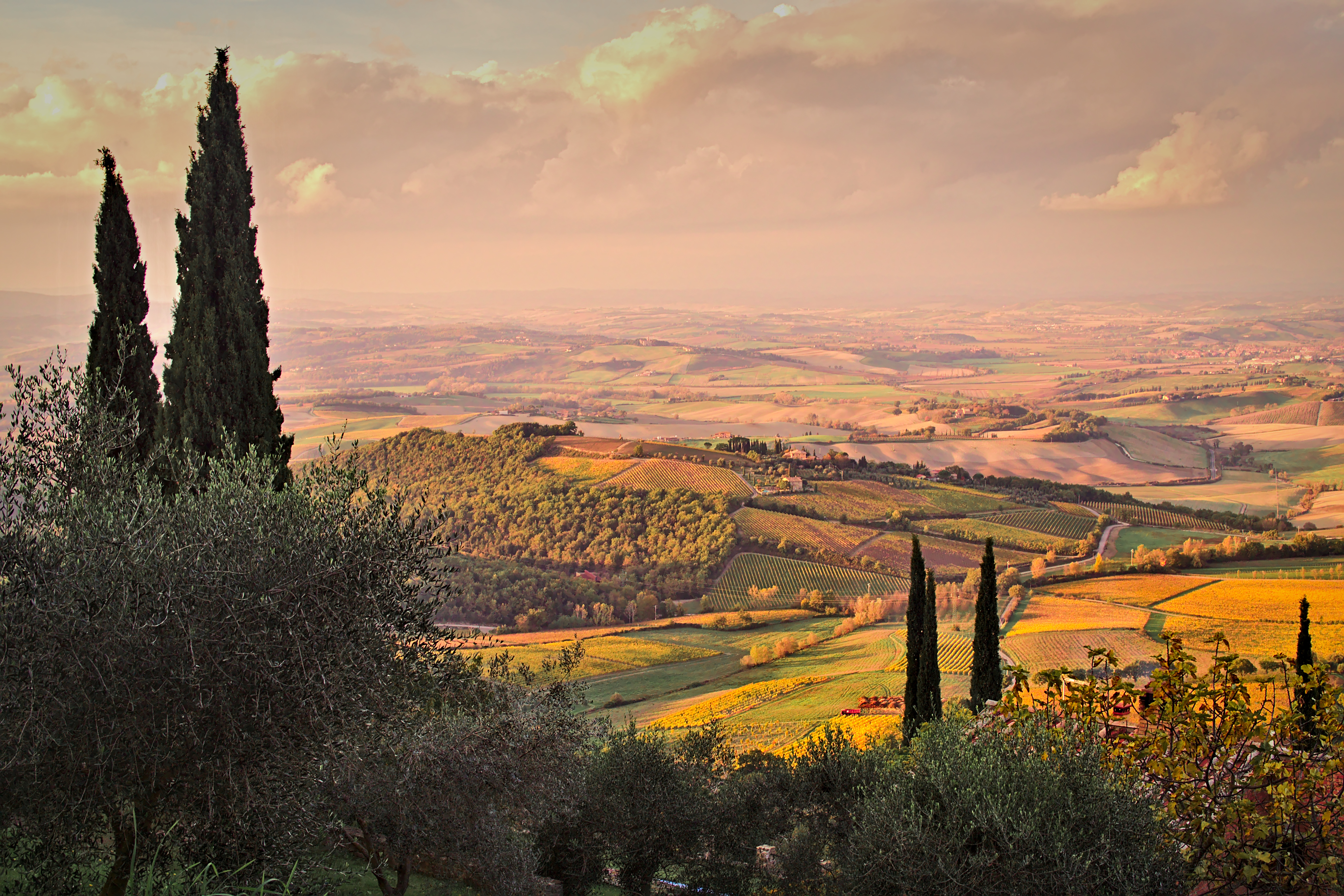
View from Montalcino.

The hill upon which Montalcino sits has probably been settled since Etruscan times. Its first mention in historical documents in 814 AD suggests there was a church here in the 9th century, most likely built by monks associated with the nearby Abbey of Sant'Antimo. The population grew suddenly in the middle of the tenth century, when people fleeing the nearby town of Roselle took up residence in the town.

The town takes its name from a variety of oak tree that once covered the terrain. The very high site of the town provides views over the Asso, Ombrone and Arbia valleys of Tuscany, dotted with olive orchards, vineyards, fields and villages. The lower slopes of the Montalcino hill itself are dominated by vines and olive orchards.

During medieval times the city was known for its tanneries and for the shoes and other leather goods that were made from the high-quality leathers that were produced there. As time went by, many medieval hill towns, including Montalcino, went into serious economic decline.

Like many of the medieval towns of Tuscany, Montalcino experienced long periods of peace and often enjoyed a measure of prosperity. This peace and prosperity was, however, interrupted by a number of extremely violent episodes.

During the late Middle Ages it was an independent commune with considerable importance owing to its location on the old Via Francigena, the main road between France and Rome, but increasingly Montalcino came under the sway of the larger and more aggressive city of Siena.

As a satellite of Siena since the Battle of Montaperti in 1260, Montalcino was deeply involved and affected by the conflicts in which Siena became embroiled, particularly in those with the city of Florence in the 14th and 15th centuries, and like many other cities in central and northern Italy, the town was also caught up in the internecine wars between the Ghibellines (supporters of the Holy Roman Empire) and the Guelphs (supporters of the Papacy). Factions from each side controlled the town at various times in the late medieval period.

Once Siena had been conquered by Florence under the rule of the Medici family in 1555, Montalcino held out for almost four years, but ultimately fell to the Florentines, under whose control it remained until the Grand Duchy of Tuscany was amalgamated into a united Italy in 1861.

In the case of Montalcino, gradual economic decline has recently been reversed by economic growth due to the increasing popularity of the town's famous wine Brunello di Montalcino, made from the sangiovese grosso grapes grown within the comune. The number of producers of the wine has grown from only 11 in the 1960s to more than 200 today, producing some 330,000 cases of the Brunello wine annually. Brunello was the first wine to be awarded Denominazione di Origine Controllata e Garantita (DOCG) status. In addition to Brunello di Montalcino, which must be aged five years prior to release, 6 years for the Riserva, Rosso di Montalcino (DOC), made from sangiovese grosso grapes and aged one year, and a variety of Super Tuscan wines are also produced within the comune, as well as the Moscadello sweet white wines for which it was most famous until the development of the Brunello series.

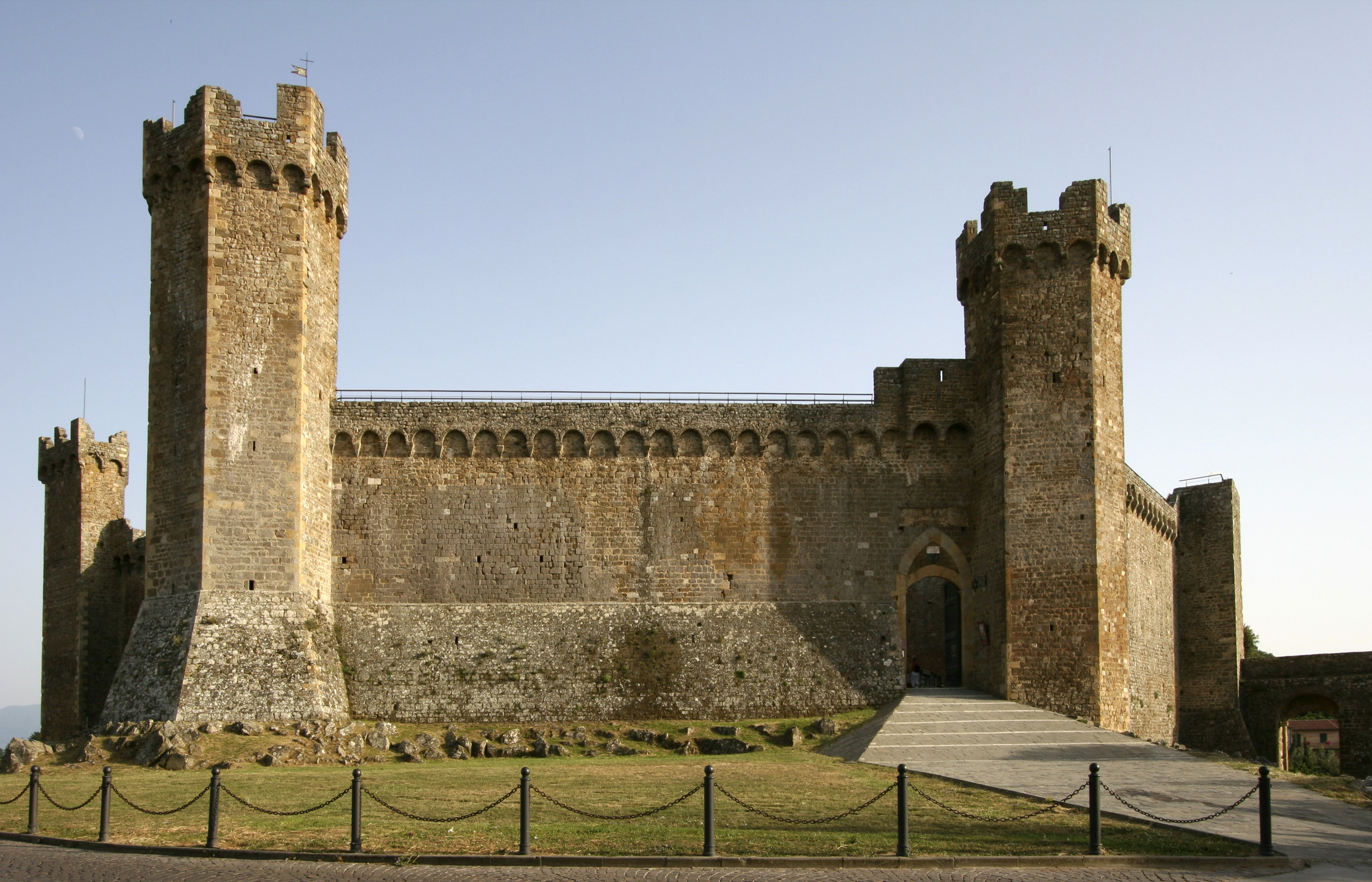
Fortress in Montalcino.

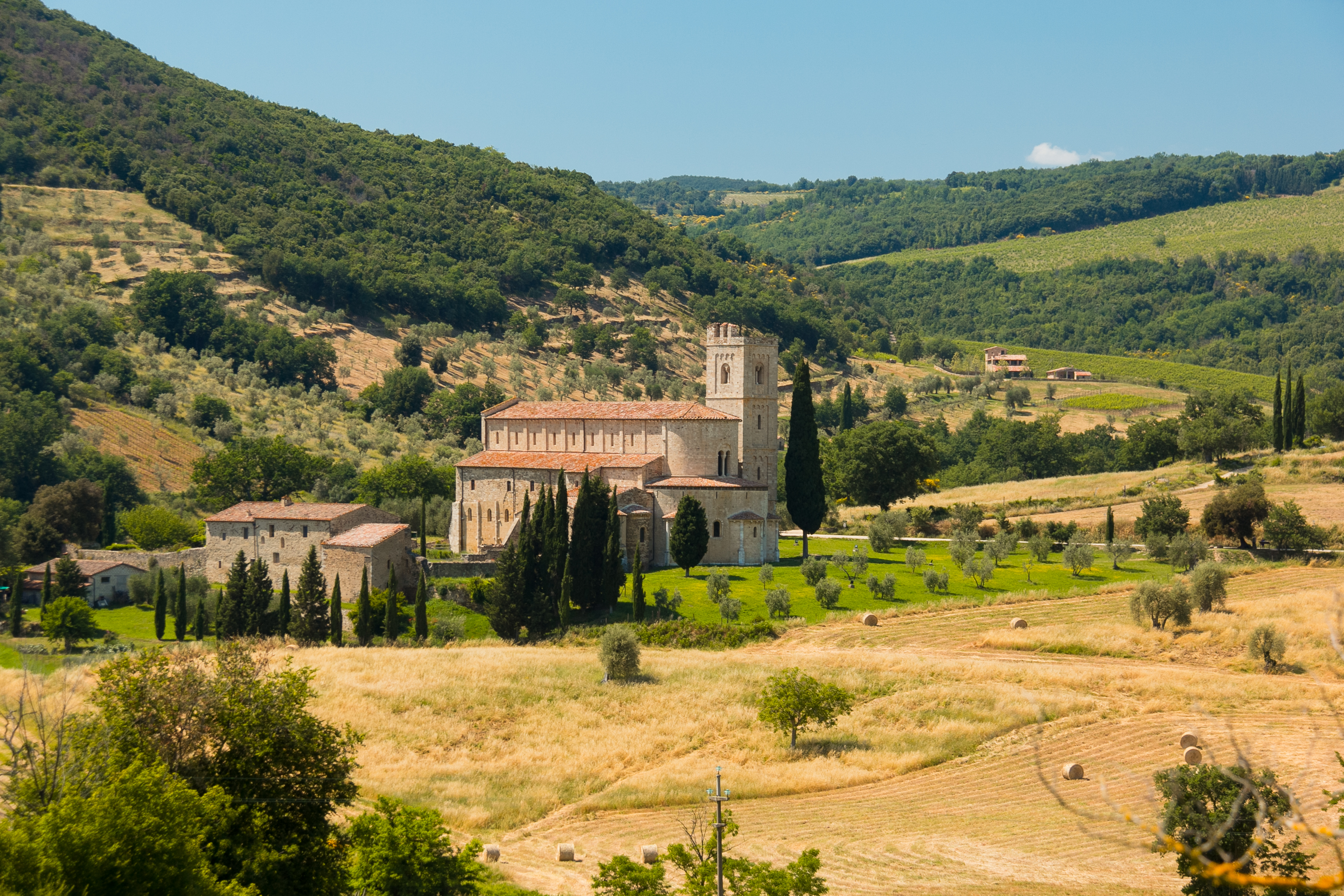
Abbey of Sant'Antimo.

== Main sights ==
=== Medieval structures ===
The first walls of the town were built in the 13th century. The fortress, built in 1361 atop the highest point of the town, was designed with a pentagonal layout by the Sienese architects Mino Foresi and Domenico di Feo. The fortress incorporates some of the pre-existing southern walls, the pre-existing structures including the keep of Santo Martini, the San Giovanni tower and an ancient basilica which now serves as the fortress chapel. Though the town itself was eventually conquered, the fortress itself never submitted, an admirable feat, considering the size of the Sienese and Florentine forces that besieged Montalcino at varying intervals.

The narrow, short street leads down from the main gate of the fortress to the Chiesa di Sant'Agostino with its simple 13th-century, Romanesque façade. Adjacent to the church is the former convent, now the Musei Riuniti, both a civic and diocesan museum, housing among its collections: a wooden crucifix by an unknown artist of the Sienese school, two 15th-century wooden sculptures, including a Madonna by an anonymous artist, and several terracotta sculptures attributed to the Della Robbia school. The collection also includes a St Peter and St Paul by Ambrogio Lorenzetti and a Virgin and Child by Simone Martini. There are also modern works from the early 20th century in the museum.

The Duomo (cathedral), dedicated to San Salvatore, was built originally in the 14th Century, but now has a 19th-century Neoclassical façade designed by the Sienese architect Agostino Fantasici.

The Piazza della Principessa Margherita is down the hill from the fortress and Duomo on the via Matteotti. The principal building on the piazza is the former Palazzo dei Priori or Palazzo Comunale (built late 13th, early 14th century), now town hall. The palace is adorned with the coats of arms of the Podesta, once rulers of the city. A tall medieval tower is incorporated into the palazzo. Close by is a Renaissance-style building with six round arches, called La Loggia, for which construction began at the very end of the 14th century and finished in the early 15th, but which has undergone much restoration work over the subsequent centuries.

Montalcino is divided, like most medieval Tuscan cities, into quarters called contrade, Borghetto, Travaglio, Pianello and Ruga, each with their own colors, songs and separate drum rhythms to distinguish them. Twice a year they meet together in a breath taking archery contest under the walls of the Fortezza, conducted in Medieval dress, with lords and ladies of each contrada who accompany the proceedings.

The 13th-century church of San Francesco in the Castlevecchio contrada has undergone several renovations. It contains 16th-century frescoes by Vincenzo Tamagni.

=== Other sights ===
- Churches with frescoes of the Sienese School
- Rocca, a ruined castle
- Sant'Antimo, a nearby Benedictine abbey
- Paleontological research into fossilised skeletons, notably a whale, at the Castello Banfi (former name: Poggio alle Mura) in 2007.

== Frazioni ==
The municipality is formed by the municipal seat of Montalcino and the towns and villages (frazioni) of Camigliano, Castelnuovo dell'Abate, Montisi, San Giovanni d'Asso, Sant'Angelo in Colle, Sant'Angelo Scalo and Torrenieri. Other notable villages include Argiano, La Croce, Lucignano d'Asso, Monte Amiata Scalo, Montelifré, Monterongriffoli, Pieve a Pava, Pieve a Salti, Poggio alle Mura, Tavernelle, Vergelle and Villa a Tolli.

== Municipal government ==
Montalcino is headed by a mayor (sindaco) assisted by a legislative body, the consiglio comunale, and an executive body, the giunta comunale. Since 1995 the mayor and members of the consiglio comunale are directly elected together by resident citizens, while from 1945 to 1995 the mayor was chosen by the legislative body. The giunta comunale is chaired by the mayor, who appoints others members, called assessori. The offices of the comune are housed in a building usually called the municipio or palazzo comunale.

Since 1995 the mayor of Montalcino is directly elected by citizens, originally every four, then every five years. The current mayor is Silvio Franceschelli (PD), elected on 7 May 2012 with 80.3% of votes, re-elected on 12 June 2017 with 74.2% of votes and re-elected again for a third term on 13 June 2022 with 80.3% of votes.

Mayor	Term start	Term end	Party
Mauro Guerrini	24 April 1995	14 June 1999	PDS
Massimo Ferretti	14 June 1999	2 April 2006 (Note: Died in office.)	DS
Claudio Cesarini (acting)	2 April 2006	29 May 2007	DS
Maurizio Buffi	29 May 2007	7 May 2012	PD
Silvio Franceschelli	7 May 2012	Incumbent	PD

== Honorary citizens ==
People awarded the honorary citizenship of Montalcino are:

Date	Name	Notes
26 January 2018	James Suckling (1958–Present)	American wine and cigar critic.

== Gallery ==
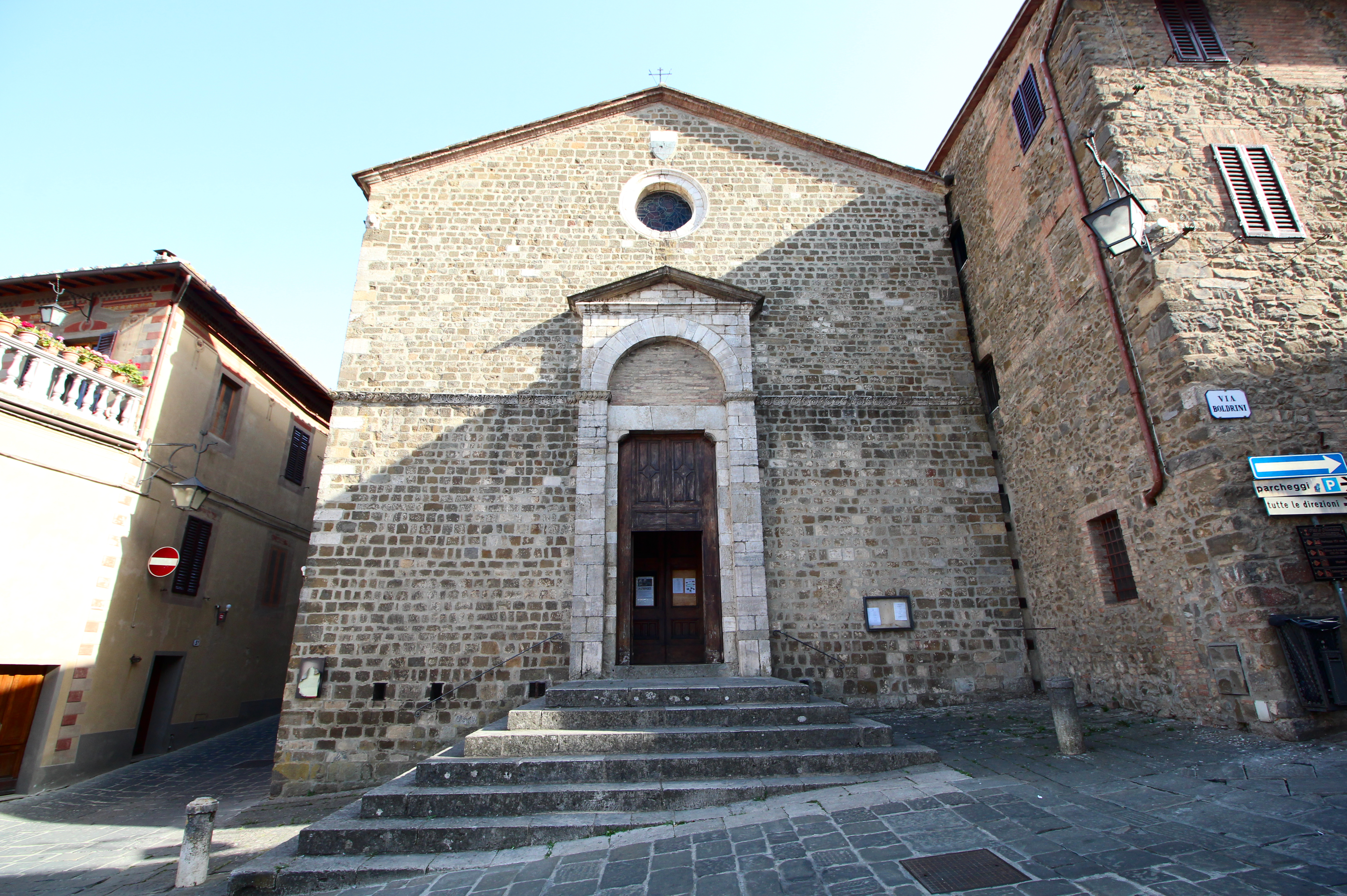
Saint Egidio church

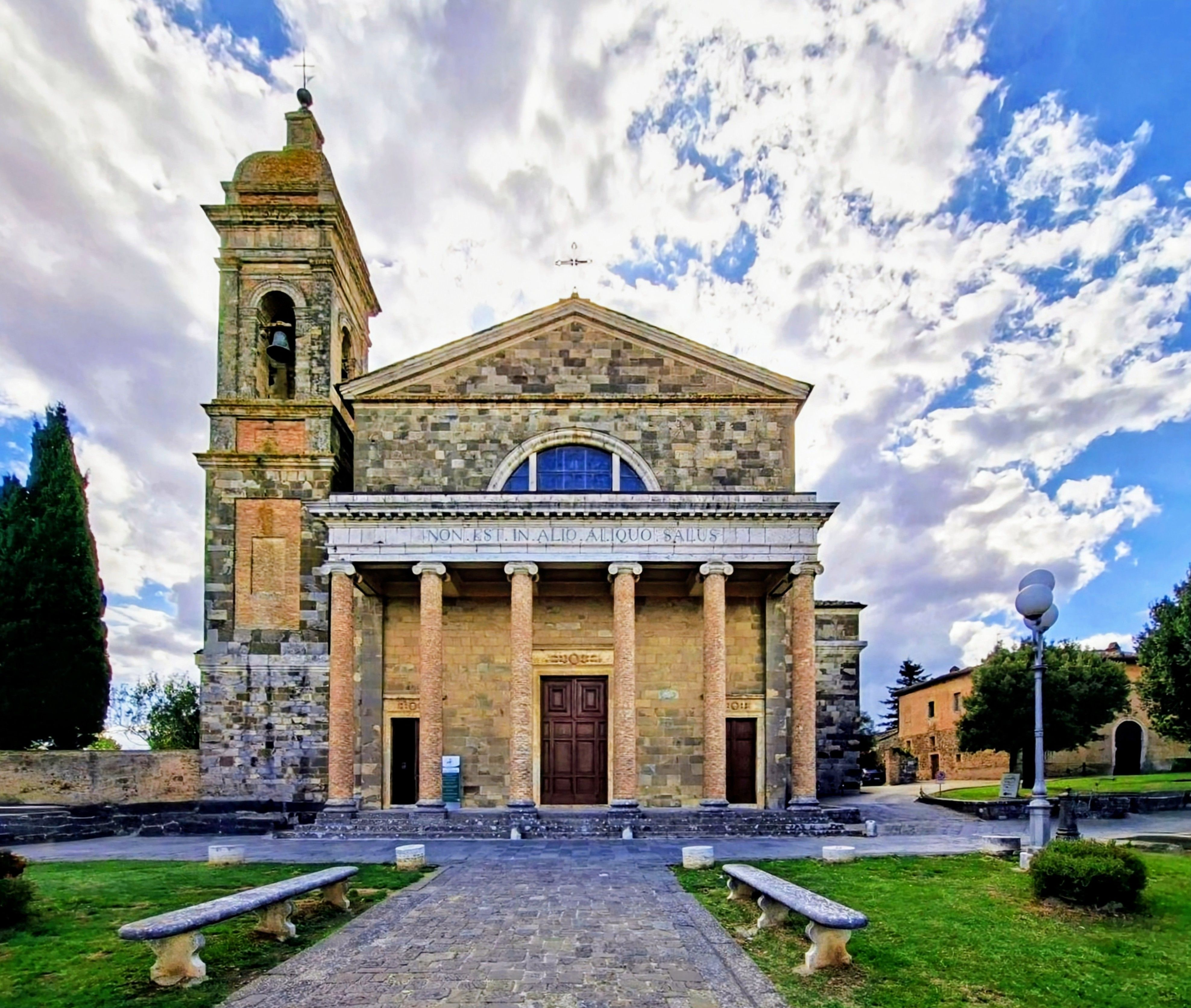
The cathedral

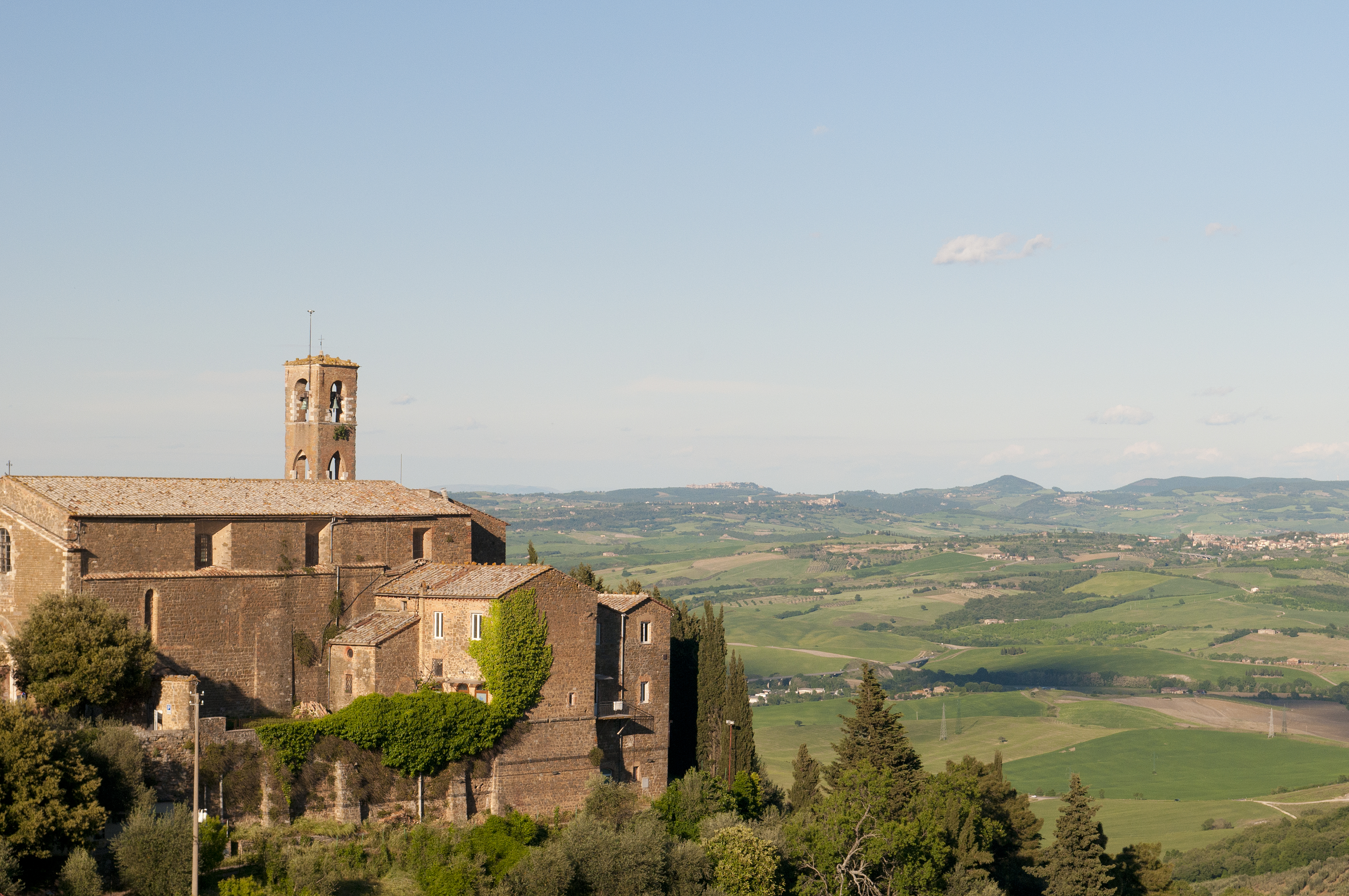
Saint Francis church

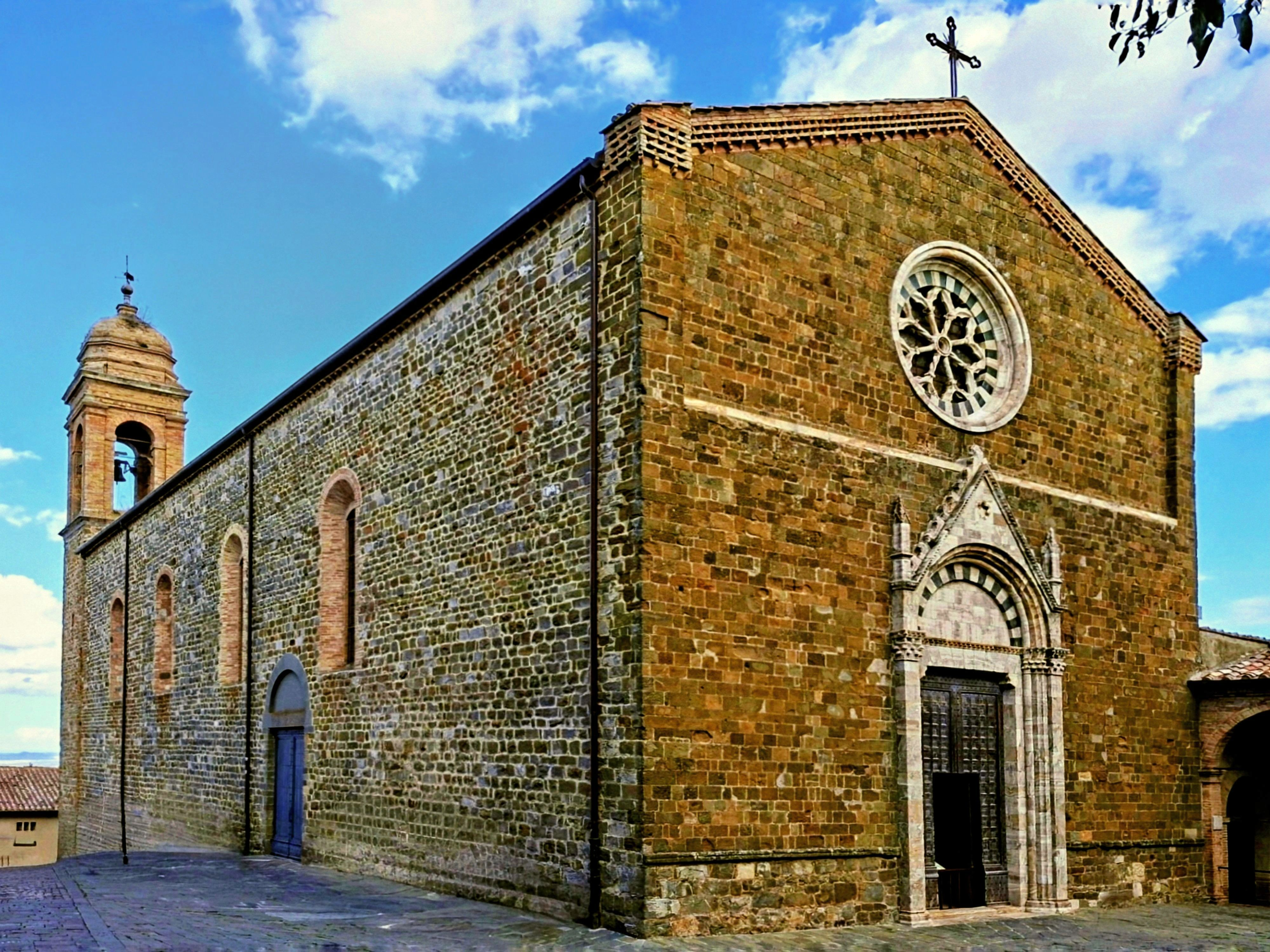
Saint Augustine church

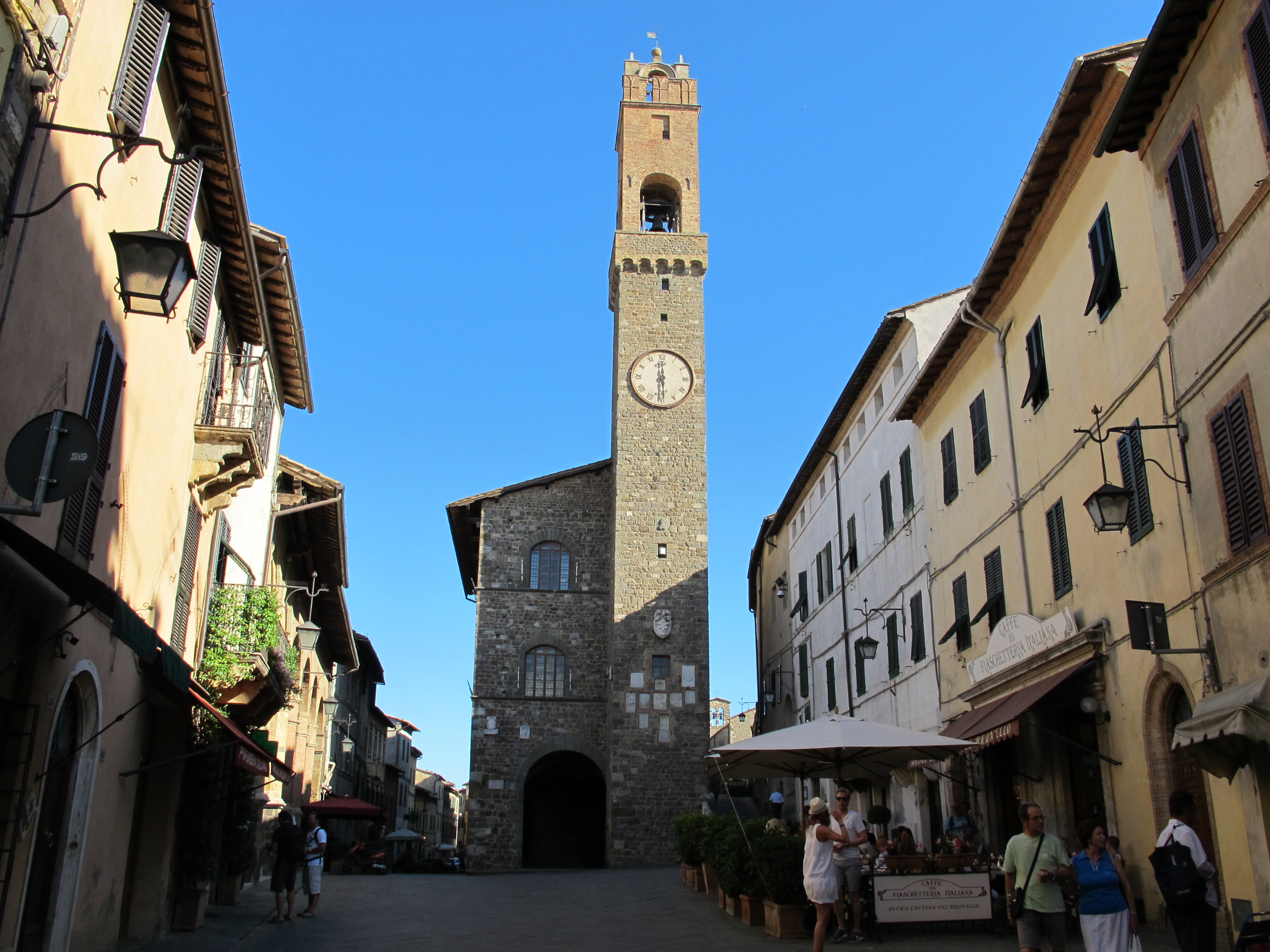
Old city centre

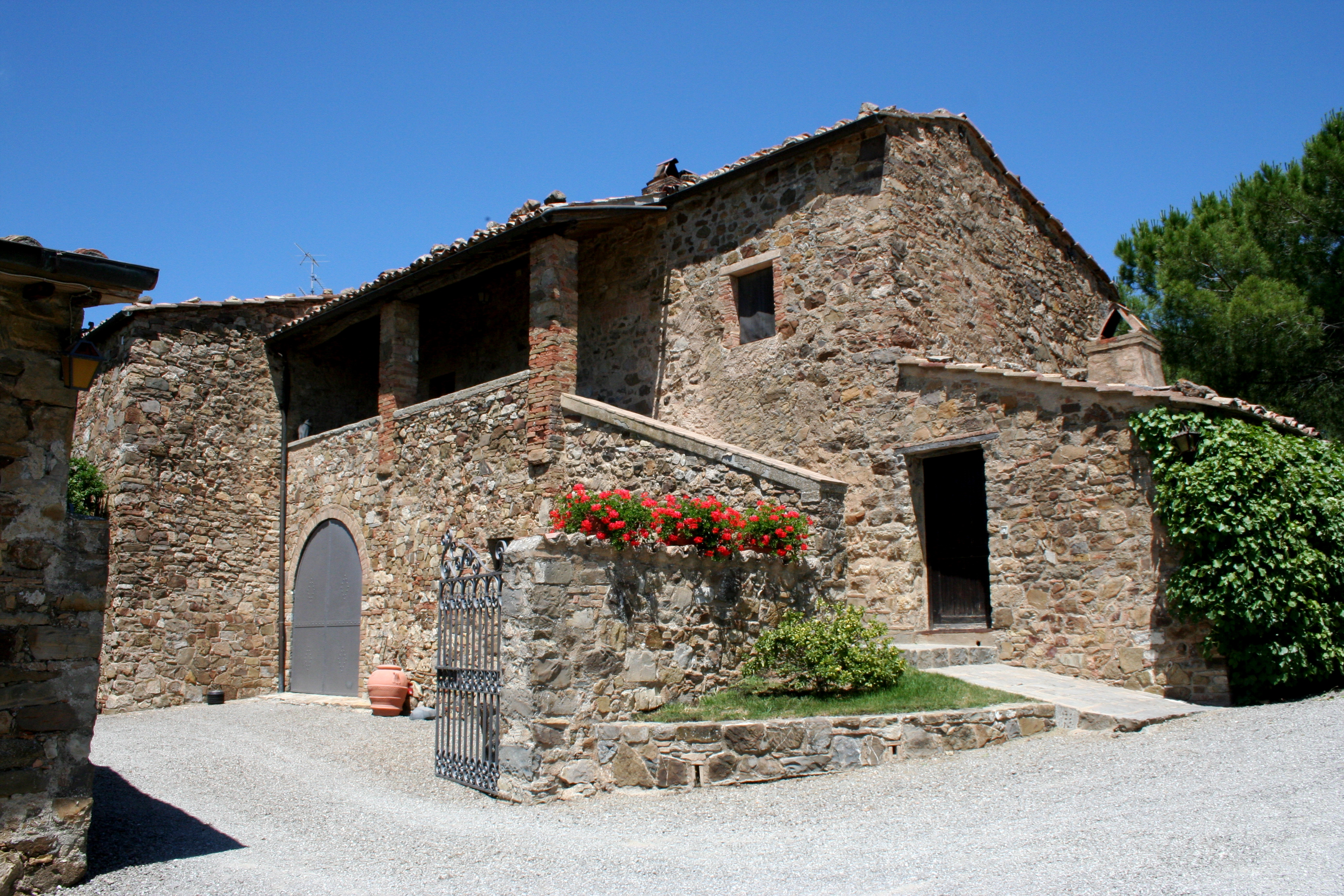
Old house

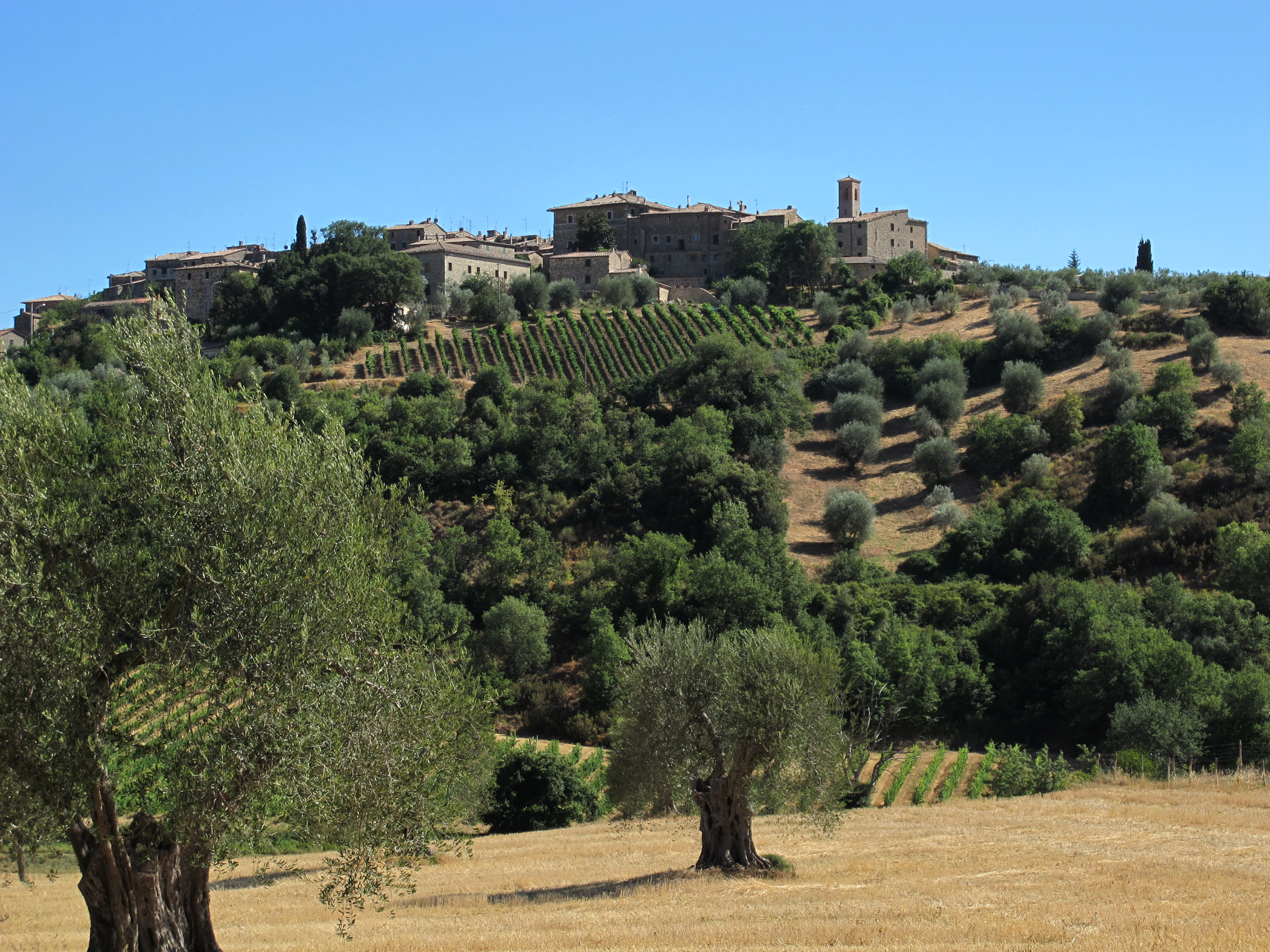
Castelnuovo dell'Abate

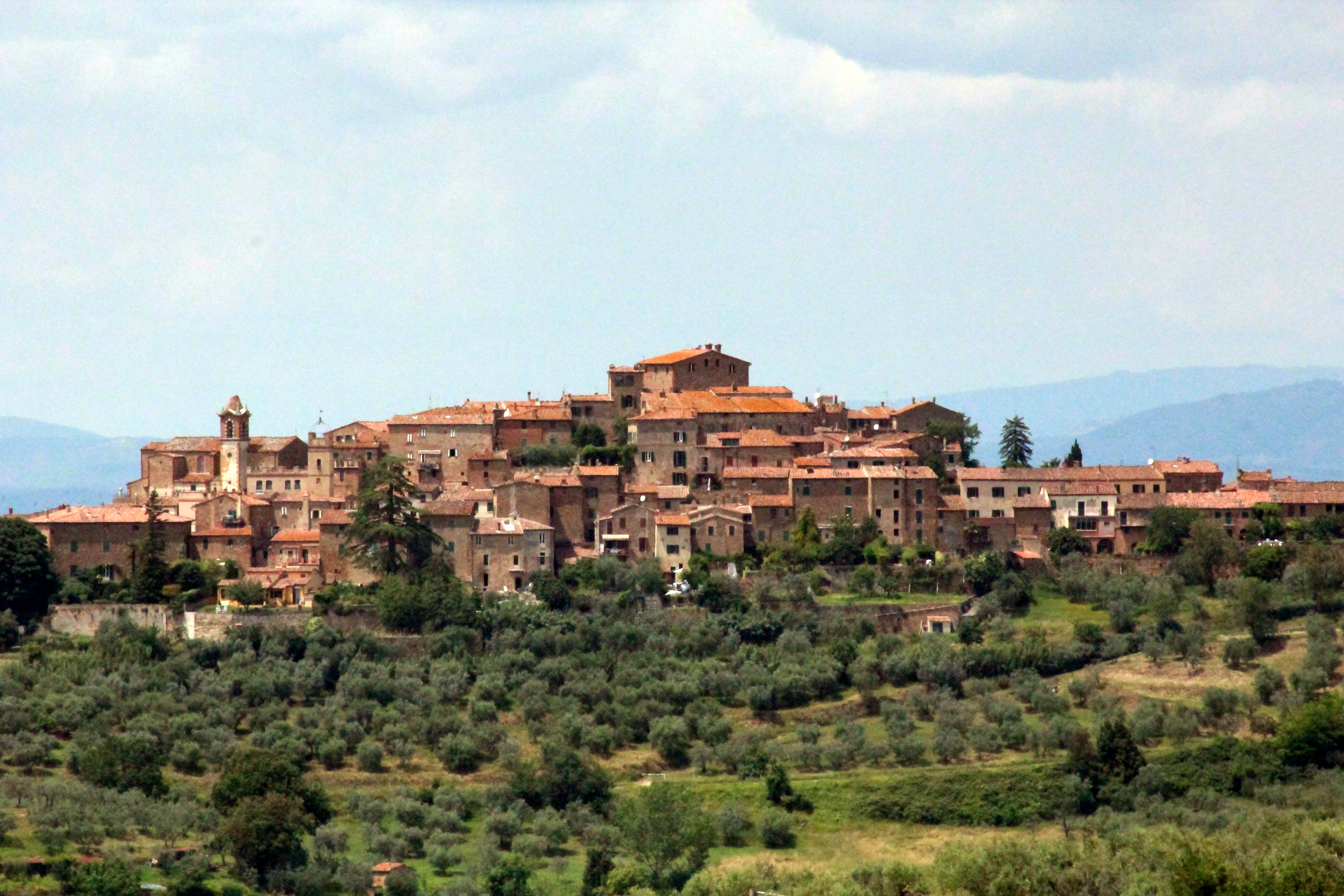
Montisi

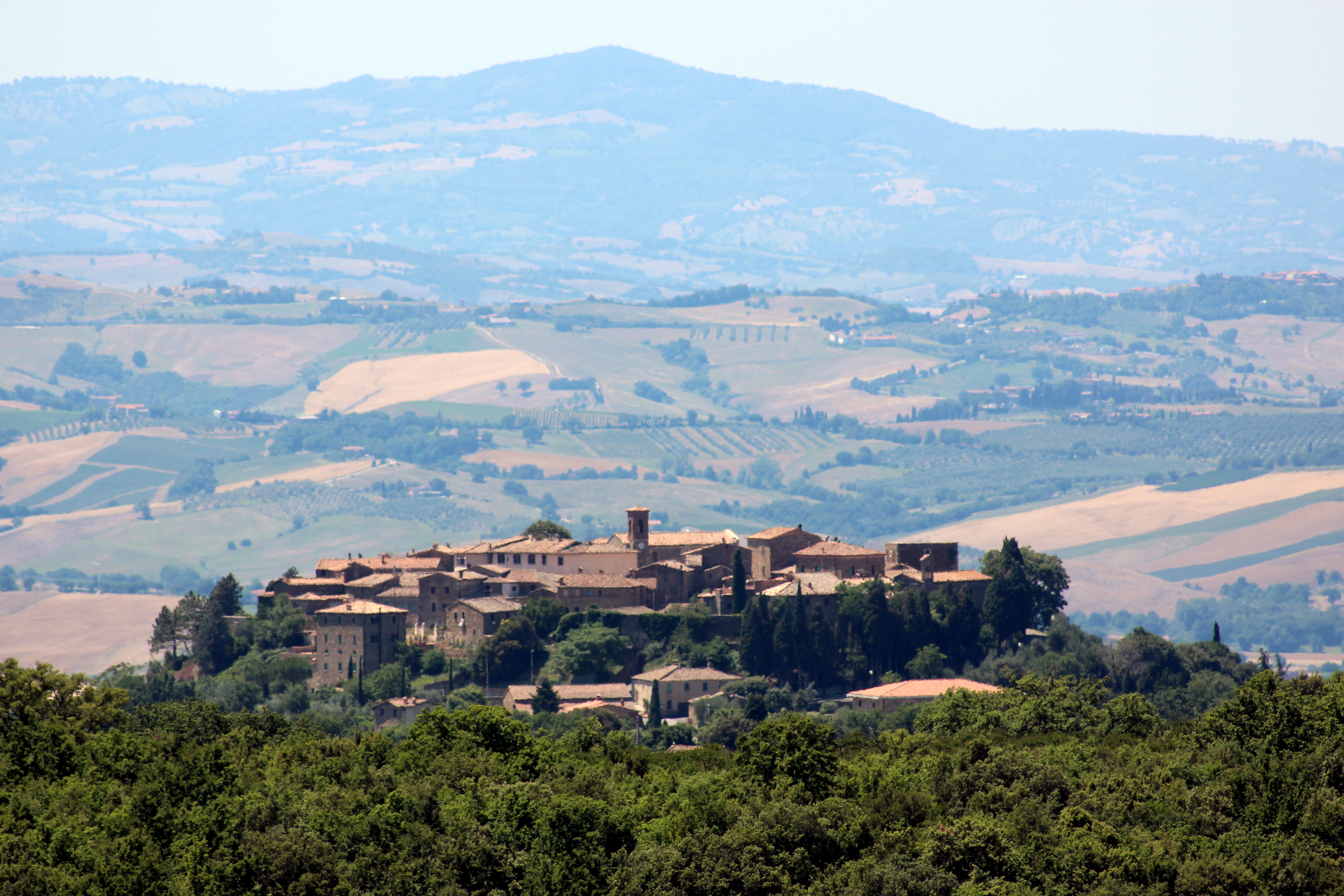
Sant'Angelo in Colle

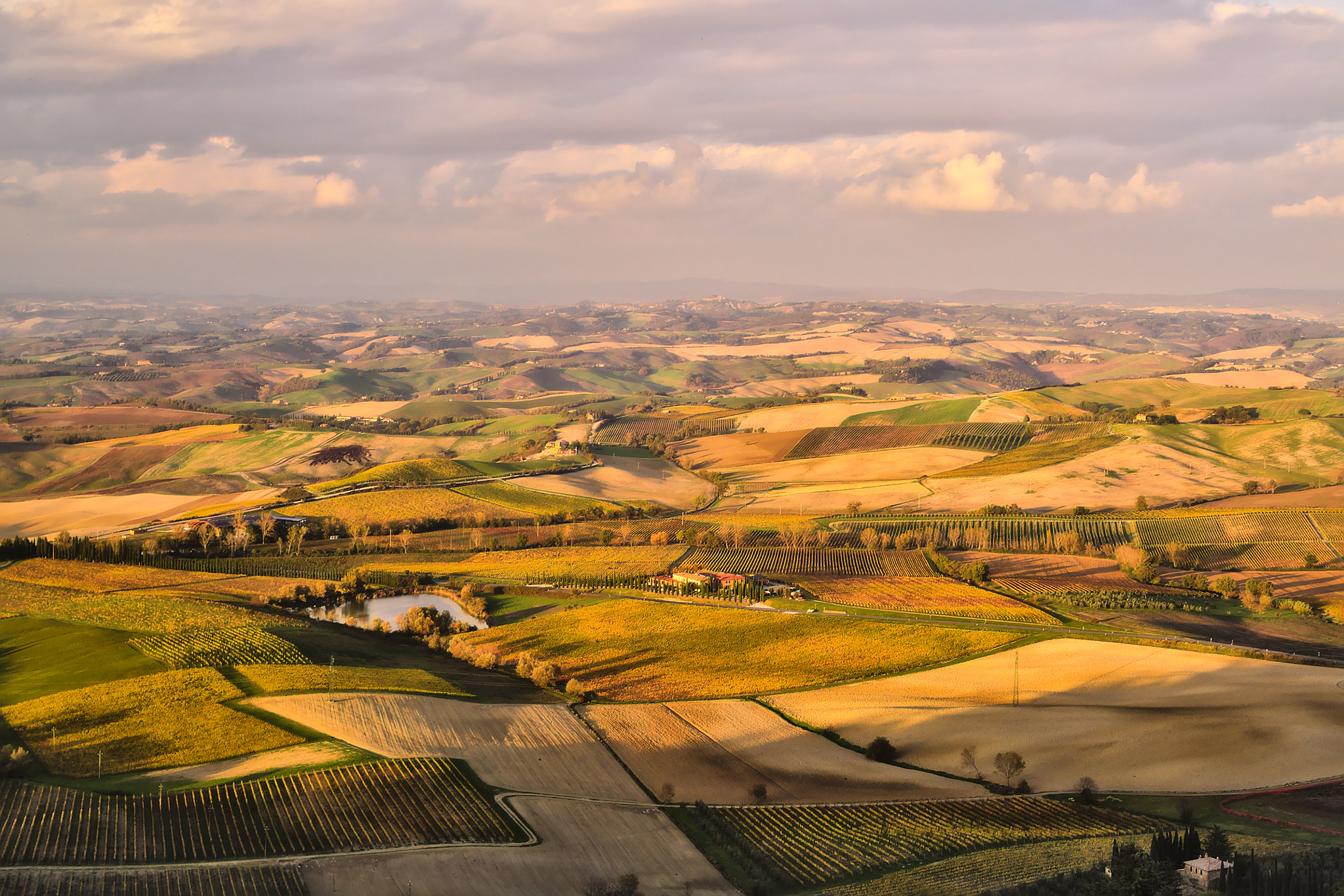
Countryside around Montalcino

== See also ==
- Brunello di Montalcino
- Val d'Orcia
