= Polizia Penitenziaria =

Italian law enforcement agency

Corpo di Polizia Penitenziaria
- The coat of arms of the Polizia Penitenziaria
- Common name: Polizia Penitenziaria

Agency overview
- Formed: 1817 (original form), 1990 (current form)

Jurisdictional structure
- National agency: Italy
- Operations jurisdiction: Italy
- General nature: Civilian police

Operational structure
- Agency executive: Massimo Parisi, director
- Parent agency: Ministry of Justice

Notables
- Significant operation: Prisons security

Website
- poliziapenitenziaria.gov.it

The Polizia Penitenziaria (lit. 'Penitentiary Police' or 'Prison Police'), formally the Corpo di Polizia Penitenziaria, is a law enforcement agency in Italy which is subordinate to the Italian Ministry of Justice and operates the Italian prison system as corrections officers. Vatican City, an independent state, does not have a prison system, so the Vatican sends convicted criminals to the Italian prison system.

According to Interpol, this force (as part of the Ministry of Justice) has a "nationwide remit for prison security, inmate safety and transportation".

== Operations ==
The Polizia Penitenziaria carries out the functions of the Judicial Police, Public Safety, Traffic Police, and Corrections. They support other law enforcement agencies, such as with traffic roadblocks (known as controllo).

== Weapons ==
The Polizia Penitenziaria are an armed police force, like most Italian police forces, and it uses a variety of firearms and weapons for self-defence:

Weapon	Origin	Type
Beretta 92FS	Italy	Standard issue sidearm
HK MP5	Germany	Submachine gun
Beretta PM 12	Italy	Submachine gun

== Uniform ==
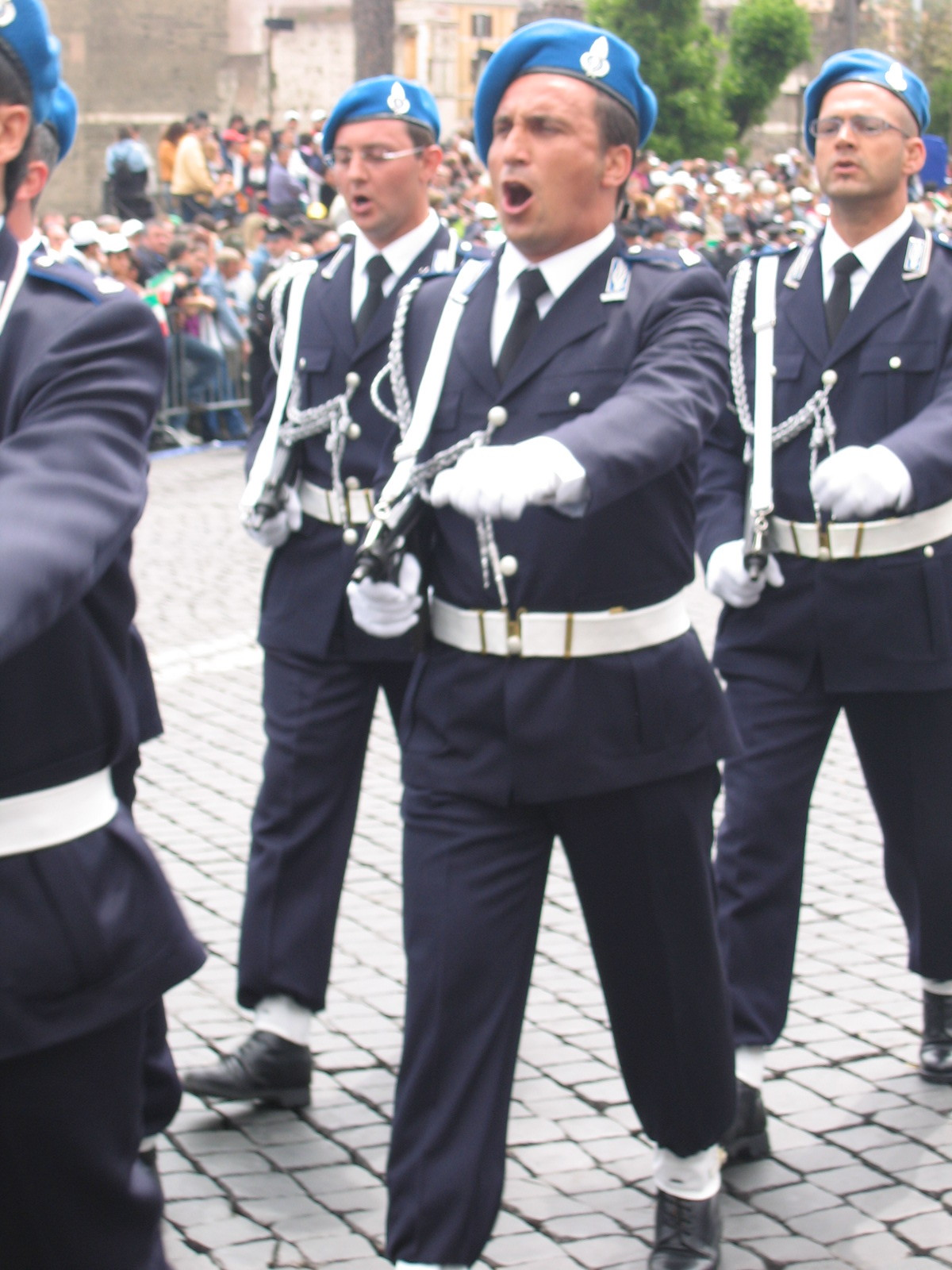
Polizia Penitenziaria on parade in Rome during the Italian Republic Day 2006 with Beretta PM 12 weapons, in Parade Services Uniform for non-officer and executive roles

As a national, civilian police force, the uniform and insignia is similar to other Italian police forces, with historical, service, and seasonal variations, as well as rank.

Principally, there are:

- Ordinary winter uniform: everyday uniform; blue trousers & blue tunic, white shirt & tie, black leather gloves, peaked/bowler caps, pistol holster worn from left bottom pocket flap
- Ordinary summer uniform: everyday uniform; blue trousers & blue tunic, white shirt & tie, peaked/bowler caps, pistol holster worn from left bottom pocket flap, no gloves
- Winter Service uniform: same as above, but with a light blue beret for males & females, instead of peaked/bowler caps
- Summer Service uniform: same as above, but with lighter fabric tunic and no gloves
- Reduced Summer Service uniform: the tunic is removed and replaced with a short-sleeve, collared blue shirt, with rank worn on the shoulder boards.
- Armed uniform: same as service uniform, but with a belt over the top of the tunic, with pistol and other equipment, worn with light blue beret only
- Operational uniform: training and operations work, outdoor style uniform with beret, with winter jacket
- Reduced operational uniform (summer months): training and operations work, outdoor style uniform with beret, but with short-sleeve polo shirt and without jacket
- Public order/riot control uniform: disorder
- Uniform for Honour Services - Officer and Executive ranks: blue tunic and trousers, peaked/bowler cap, blue shoulder sash, officer sword/sabre, white plain belt, white gaiters, white gloves
- Uniform for Honour Services - non officer ranks: blue tunic and trousers, peaked/bowler cap, white plain belt, white gaiters, blue cords, white gloves
- Uniform for Parade Services - Officer and Executive ranks: the same as Uniform for Honour Services, but with light blue beret rather than peaked or bowler cap
- Uniform for Parade Services - non officer ranks: the same as Uniform for Honour Services, but with light blue beret rather than peaked or bowler cap, no cords and white full webbing with double shoulder belts, often with a sub-machine gun (MP5 or PM 12)
- Marine section uniform: marine/naval work
- Canine (dog) section uniform: for canine agents
- Motorcyclist uniform: for motorcycle duties
- Mounted section uniform

Uniforms are then further split along the lines of:

- Rank: some uniforms will rarely be worn by more senior officers and the insignia and accompliments on each uniform, will differ according to rank.
- Season (weather): e.g. shirt sleeves, polo shirts, capes, coats, etc.

The type of uniform worn depends also on the duty being carried out. E.g. office work, prison landing work, armed exterior patrols or riots all require different uniform and equipment.

=== Notes ===
- The aiguillette (lanyard on tunic) changes with the role.
- For more senior officers (executives, inspectors etc) they carry their individual weapon (pistol) in a special internal holster in black leather, under the flap of the tunic.

== Recruiting ==
The Polizia Penitenziaria recruits its members through an open, public, and competitive exam which is announced by the Ministry of Justice.

The training academies for the Polizia Penitenziaria are located in Aversa, Monastir, Cairo Montenotte, Castiglione delle Stiviere, Parma, Portici, Rome, San Pietro Clarenza, Verbania, and Sulmona.

=== Previous requirements ===
Until the approval of the ordinary law n. 225 23 August 2004, the selection was open to any Italian civil citizen who had the requisites for absolving the military service.

Those people had the right to absolve it directly within the Polizia Penitenziaria, after having passed the public exam for the qualification as an auxiliary agent. The selection was reserved to the Italian male residents who were eligible for the military service.

From 1 January 2005 to 31 December 2016, the working positions, which had been object of public selection, were reserved to volunteers who had a conscription in the Italian Armed Forces for one year (VFP1) or for four years (VFP4).

On 1 January 2017, the public selections were newly open to civil citizens and a share of 40% of the available working roles began to be reserved to them.

The psycho-physical requisites were the same fixed by the Decree of Italian President of Republic n. 904, which had come into force on 23 December 1983.

As of July 2021, the winners of the public exam have to frequent and pass an additional formative course whose duration ranges from around a year for the auxiliary agents to 24 months for the police commissioners.

The latter position is solely accessible by people who are graduated with a 5-years degree in Jurisprudence or analogue degree titles.

== Gallery ==
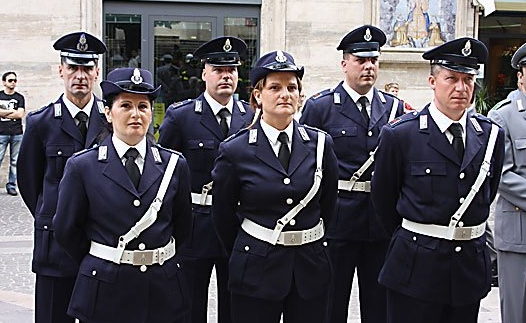
Polizia Penitenziaria officers

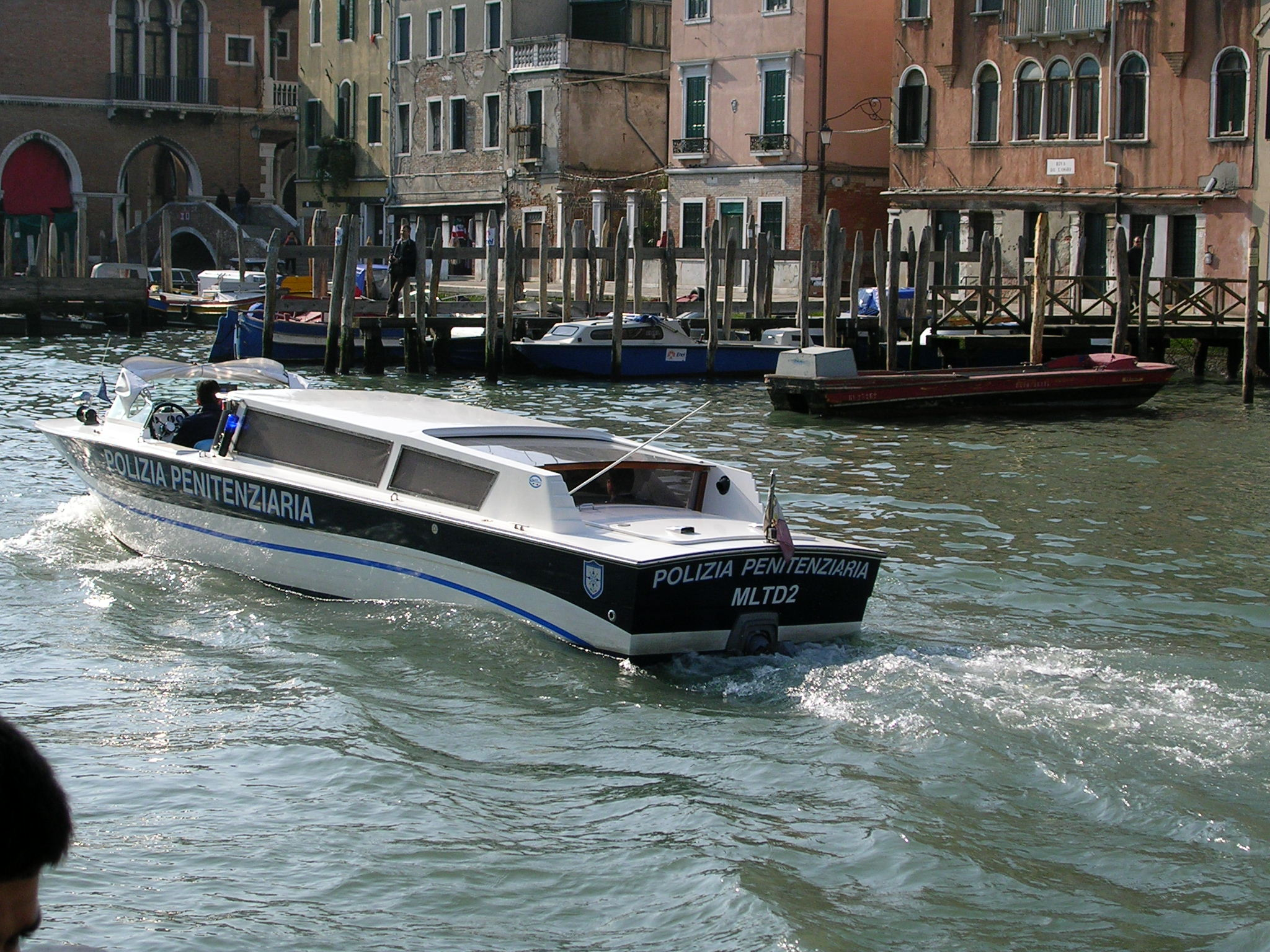
Polizia Penitenziaria boat in Venice

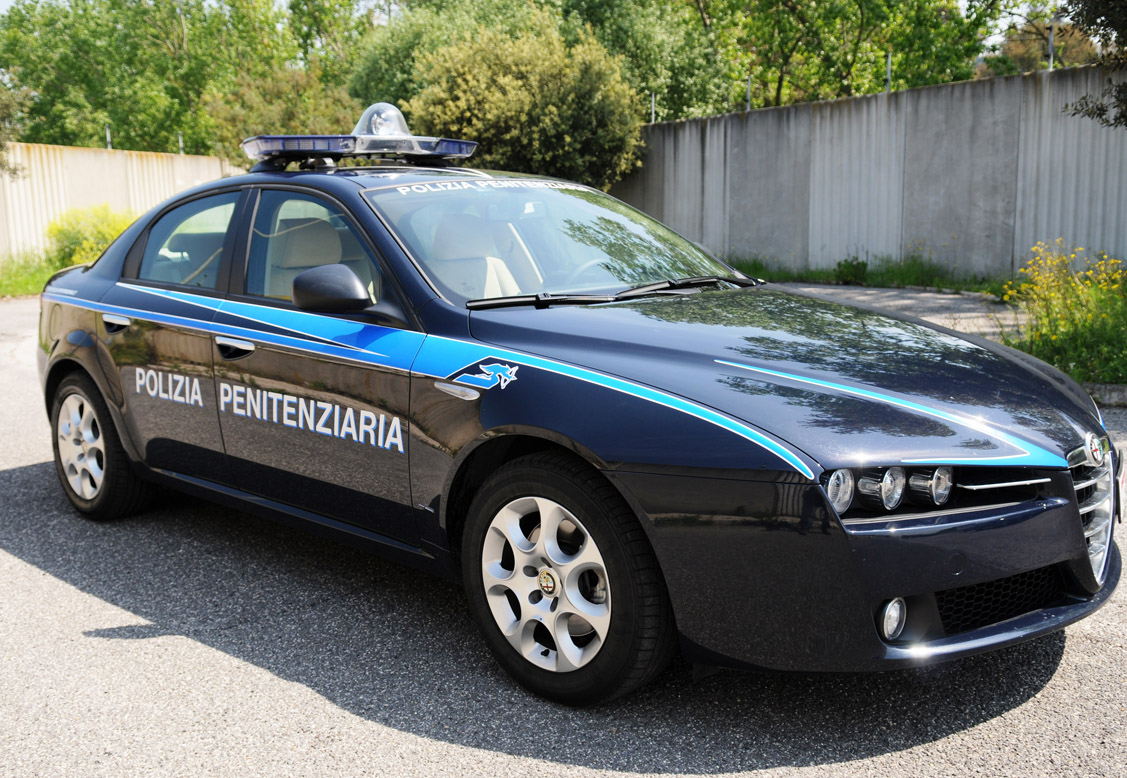
Polizia Penitenziaria Alfa Romeo 159 police car

== See also ==
- Gruppo Sportivo Fiamme Azzurre
- Law enforcement in Italy
