= Law enforcement in Italy =

Law enforcement agencies in Italy

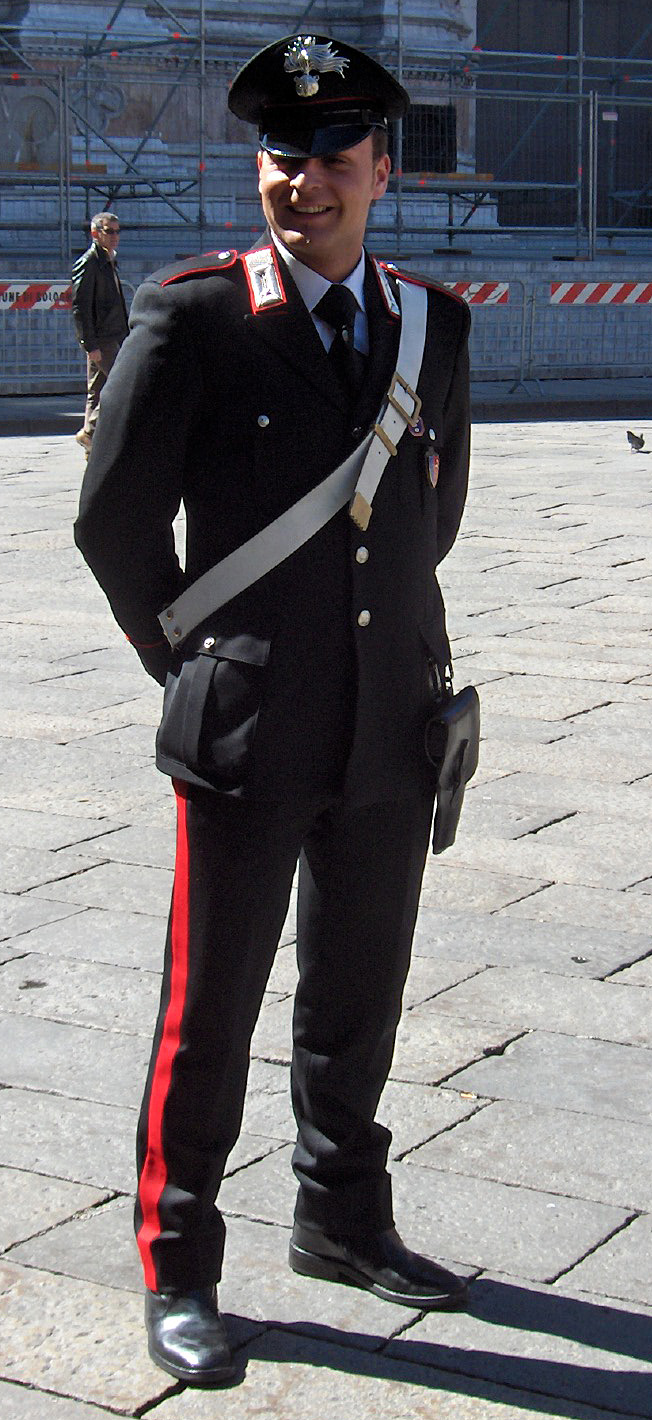
A Carabiniere in Bologna

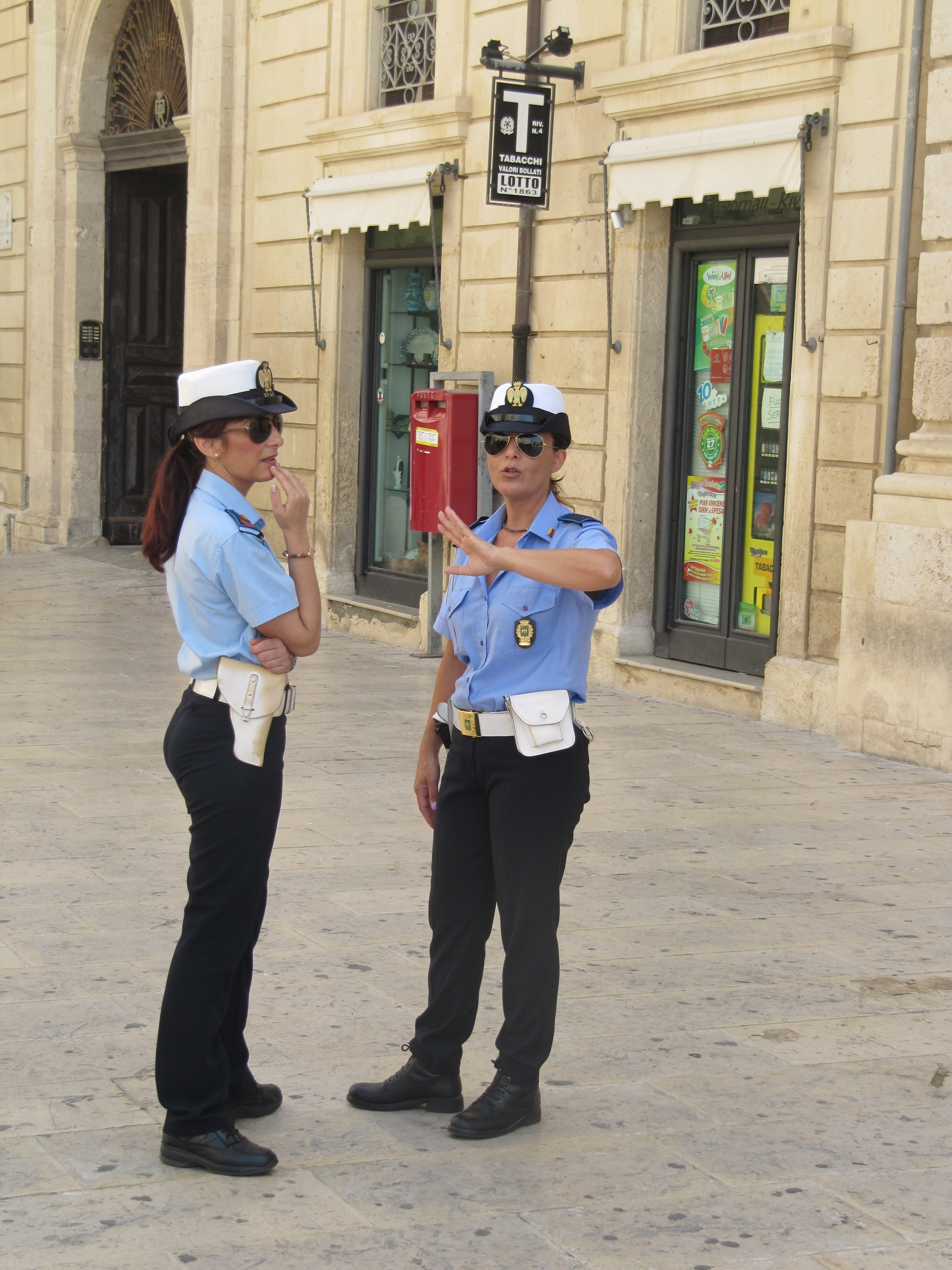
Local police officers of Syracuse

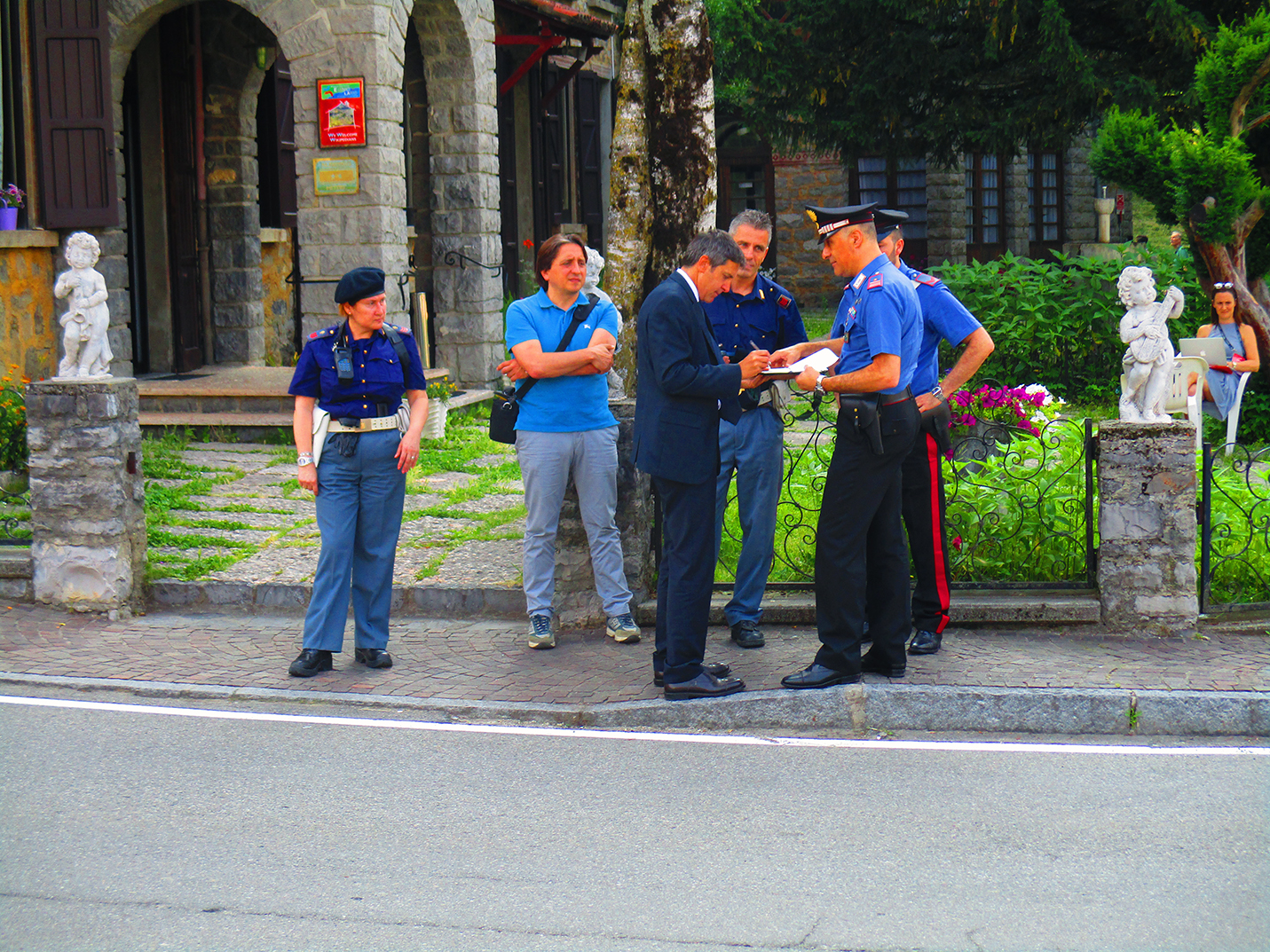
Carabinieri and Polizia di Stato during inspections

Law enforcement in Italy is centralized on a national level, with multiple national forces, assisted by some local law enforcement agencies. The two main police forces are the Carabinieri, the national gendarmerie, and the Polizia di Stato, the civil national police. The Guardia di Finanza is a militarized police force responsible for dealing with financial crime, smuggling, customs, maritime patrolling and illegal drug trade. Border patrolling are undertaken by the Polizia di Frontiera, a division of the Polizia di Stato. The Guardia Costiera (coast guard) is part of Marina Militare (Italian Navy) and is Italy's coast guard responsible for maritime patrolling along with the Guardia di Finanza. The Polizia Penitenziaria (Prison Police) is the national prison police agency, controlling penitentiaries and inmate transfers. The Corpo Forestale dello Stato (State Forestry Corps) formerly existed as a separate national park ranger agency, but was merged into the Carabinieri in 2016. Alongside national police forces,Polizia Locale are also concerned with policing at a local level.

== Summary ==
The Italian law enforcement system is complex, with multiple police forces and agencies handling various duties. "Full-powered officers" primarily come from the national forces, carrying out investigation and arrest duties. Local forces have more limited roles.

Force	English translation	Type	Responsibility
Polizia di Stato	State Police	Civilian police	Patrolling, investigative, immigration control, administrative and law enforcement duties
Carabinieri	Carabiners	Gendarmerie; militarized police constituting the fourth branch of the Italian armed forces.	Patrolling, investigative, and law enforcement duties outside the larger urban areas. Also military police for the Italian Armed Forces.
Guardia di Finanza	Financial Guard	Militarized police	Dealing with financial crime, smuggling, illegal drug trade, patrolling Italy's territorial waters, maintaining public security, and other duties.
Polizia Penitenziaria	Prison Police	Prison officer	Controlling penitentiaries and inmate transfers
Guardia Costiera	Coast Guard	Coast guard; militarized police belonging to the Italian Navy.	Undertaking maritime patrolling duties
Polizia Locale	Local Police	Civilian police	Patrolling, investigative, administrative and traffic police

The main forces are managed at the provincial level under the authority of the Questore (the local head of police) in accordance with the Prefetto, the provincial representative of the Government.

Law enforcement is an exclusive function of the State, organized under the Ministry of the Interior, with provincial division and jurisdiction.

The highest office in charge of law enforcement is the ministerial office of "Dipartimento della Pubblica Sicurezza".

In 2005, Italy had 324,339 active police officers, the highest number in the European Union both overall and per capita, twice the number of agents in the similarly sized United Kingdom. In 2020 this was 237,910, behind only France and Germany in the EU.

== National police forces ==
=== Polizia di Stato ===
The Polizia di Stato (State Police) is the civil national police of Italy. It patrols the Autostrade (Italy's Express Motorways network) and oversees the security of railways, bridges, and waterways, in addition to patrolling, investigative, and law enforcement duties.

It is a civilian police force, distinct from the military Carabinieri and Guardia di Finanza. Its internal organization and mindset are somewhat military, but its personnel are civilians. Its headquarters are in Rome, with regional and provincial divisions.

It is also the only authority that can issue special licenses and passports.

Unlike the Carabinieri, the Polizia di Stato is the guardian of public order, as the Questore is the public safety authority and heads all law enforcement agencies on the territory (province), including the Carabinieri, Guardia di Finanza and the Polizia Penitenziaria.

=== Guardia di Finanza ===
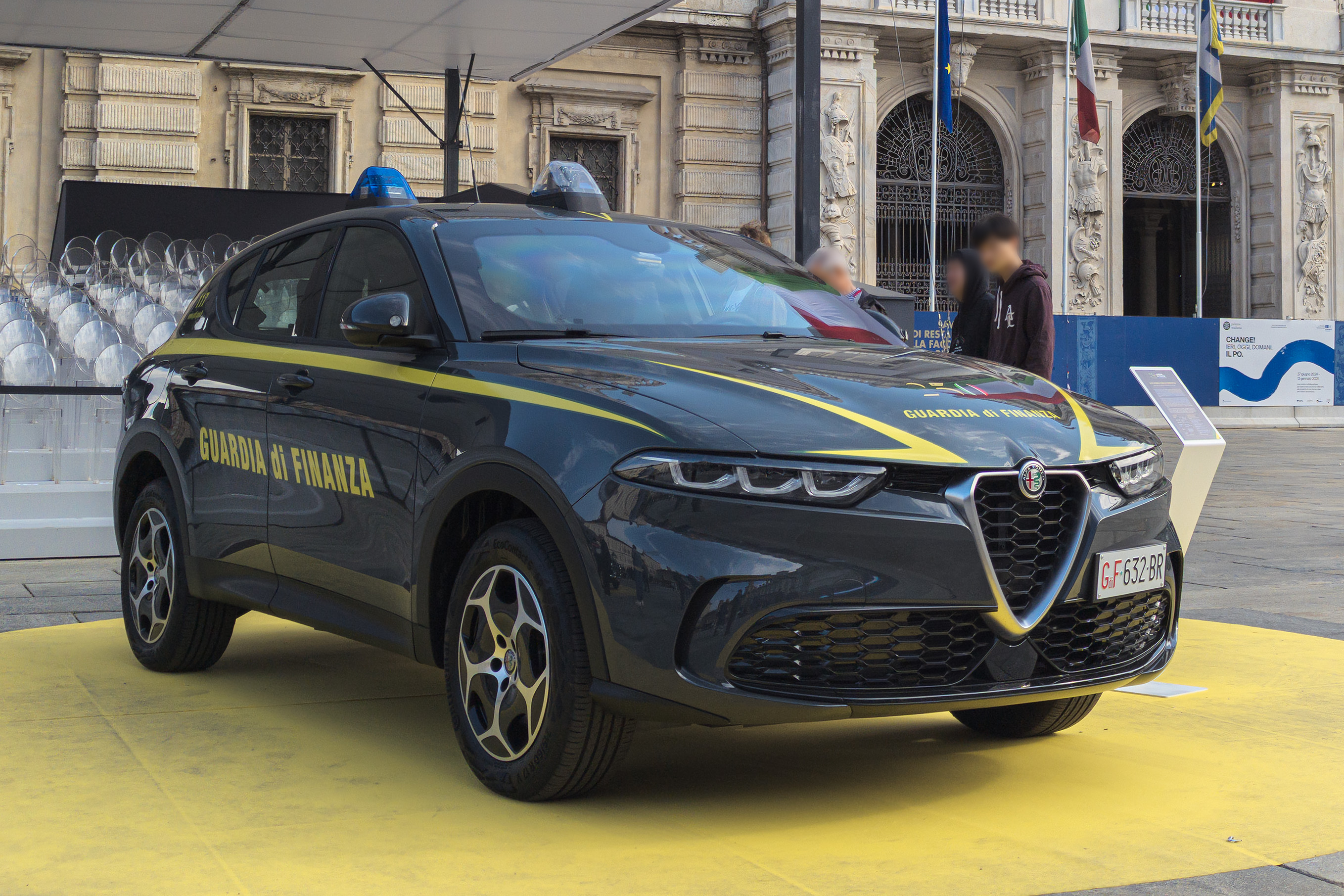
Guardia di Finanza

The Guardia di Finanza (Financial Guard) is a military corps under the authority of the Ministry of Economy and Finance, with a role as a police force.

The Corps is responsible for financial, economic, judiciary, and public safety matters. This includes tax evasion, financial crimes, smuggling, money laundering, international illegal drug trafficking, illegal immigration, customs and border checks, copyright violations, anti-Mafia operations, credit card fraud, cybercrime, counterfeiting, terrorist financing, maintaining public order, and safety, political and military defense of the Italian borders.

The Guardia di Finanza has around 68,000 soldiers, including agents, non-commissioned officers, and officers. Its personnel serve in Europol, Eurojust, and the European Anti-Fraud Office. Its Latin motto since 1933 is Nec recisa recedit (English: Not Even Broken Retreats). The Guardia di Finanza also maintains boats, ships, and aircraft to patrol Italy's territorial waters.

During demonstrations and large events, the Guardia di Finanza is often called on duty as riot police.

=== Arma dei Carabinieri ===
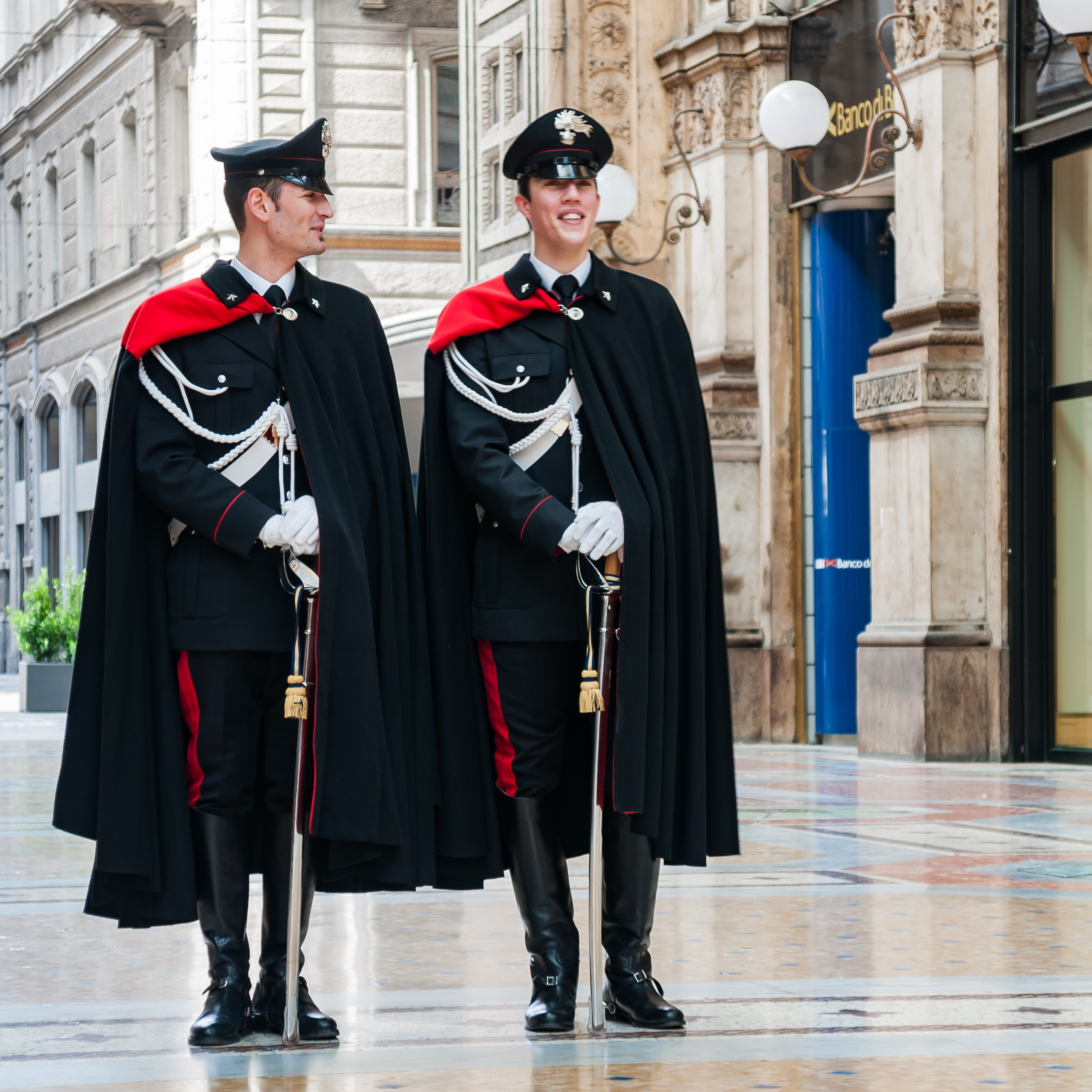
Carabinieri in full uniform

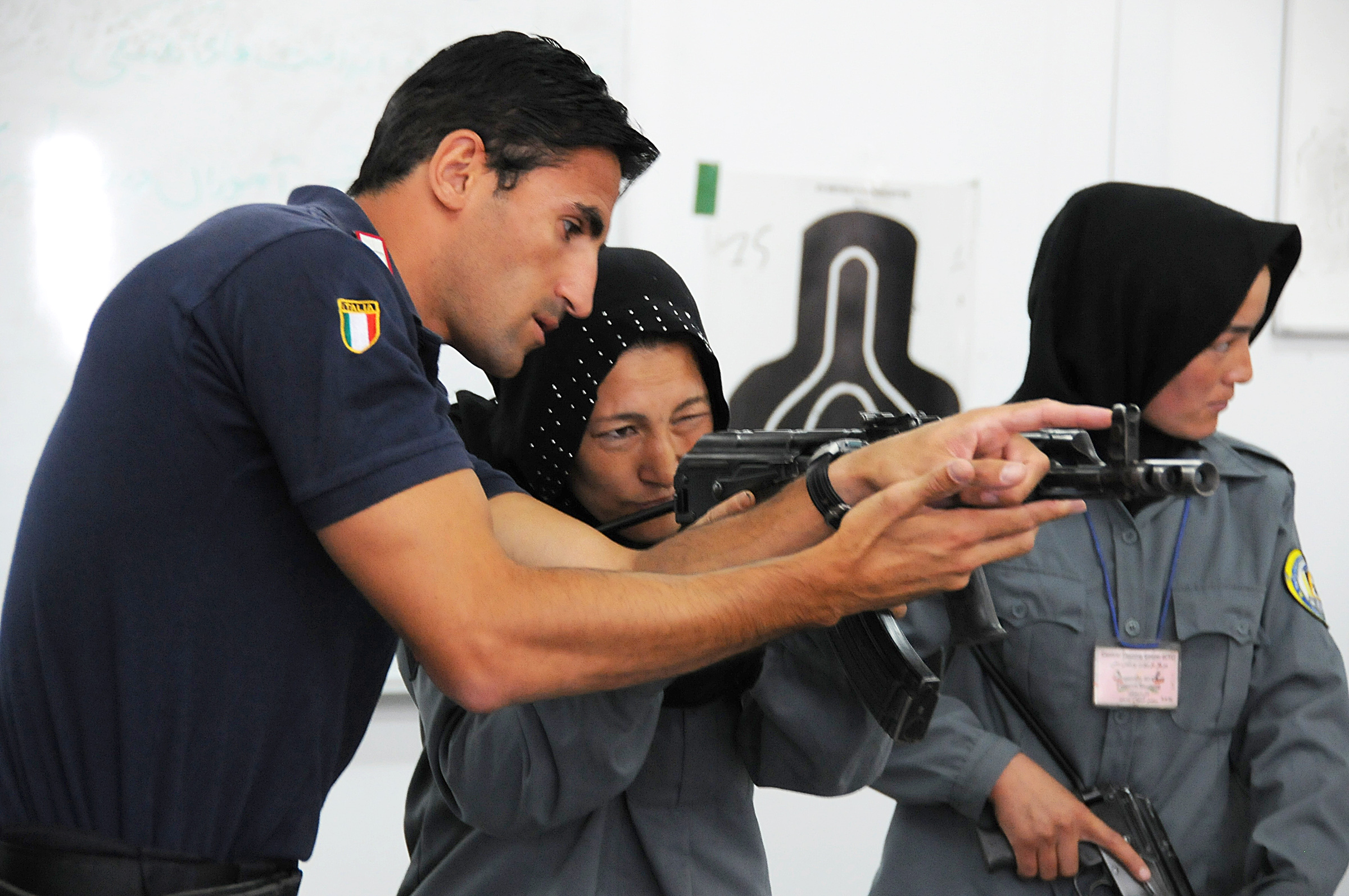
A carabiniere shows a female Afghan National Police recruit how to aim an AMD-65 at the Kabul Central Training Center in 2010 during the Operation Enduring Freedom in Afghanistan

Nicknamed La Benemerita (The Meritorious Corps), Carabinieri is the common name for the Arma dei Carabinieri, a gendarmerie-like military corps with police duties. They also serve as the military police for the Italian armed forces and can be called upon for national defence action. The Carabinieri are a separate armed force (alongside the Army, Navy, and Air Force), ending their long-standing tradition as the First Corps (Arma) of the Italian Army (Esercito).

Carabinieri units have been dispatched worldwide in peacekeeping missions, including Bosnia, Kosovo, Afghanistan, and Iraq. Military reforms have opened the Arma to women, who were previously barred from all Italian military forces until 2001.

Carabinieri stations are distributed throughout the country, with a station in approximately every municipality, and additional stations in strategic locations along motorways. The Arma is often called on duty as riot police during large events and demonstrations, fulfilling both military and civil police duties. According to Europol, this force has "4,672 stations and lieutenancies".

=== Polizia Penitenziaria ===
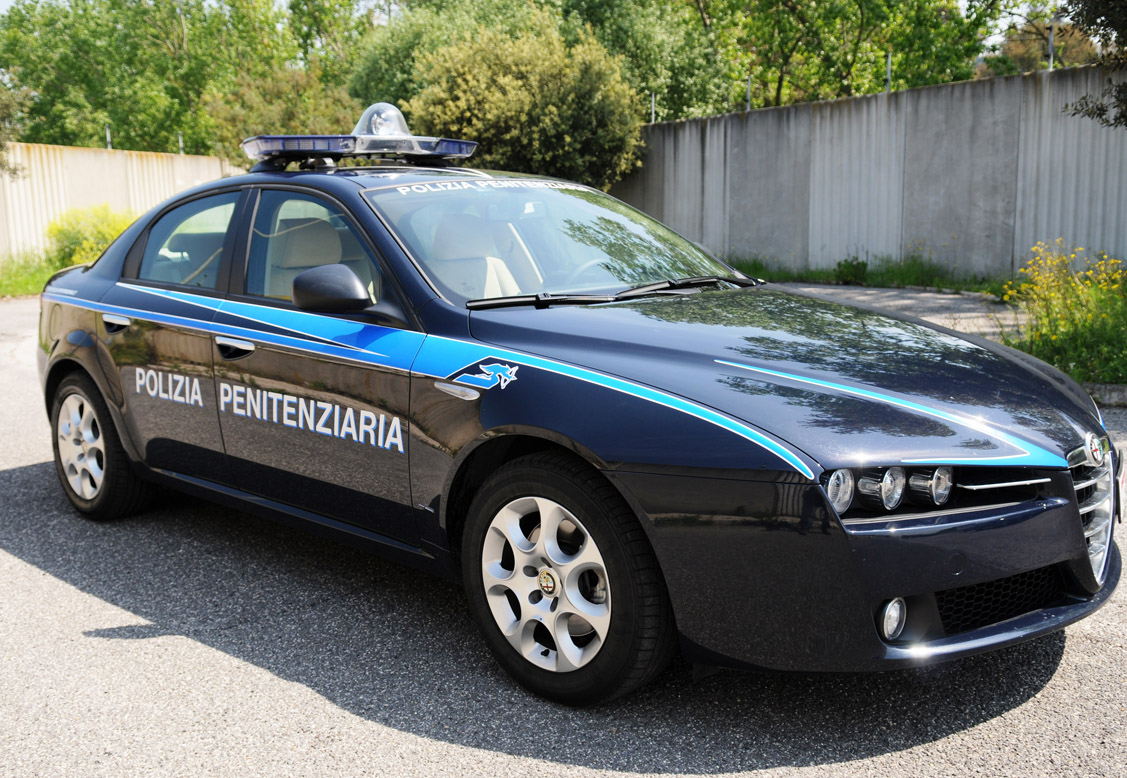
Polizia Penitenziaria (2008)

The Polizia Penitenziaria (Prison Guards, literally Penitentiary Police, also translated as Prison Police Corps) operates the Italian prison system and handles the transportation of inmates. Its agents are sometimes called to assist other police forces during major events. This force (part of the Ministry of Justice) has a "nationwide remit for prison security, inmate safety and transportation".

== Interforces ==
=== Direzione Investigativa Antimafia ===
Incidence of organized crime's extortion in Italy by province in 2012 High Mid Low Absent

The Direzione Investigativa Antimafia (or DIA) (Anti-Mafia Investigation Directorate) is a joint organization of Polizia di Stato, Carabinieri, Polizia Penitenziaria, and Guardia di Finanza combating organized crime in Italy.

Founded in 1991, under the authority of the Ministry of the Interior as the Direzione Nazionale Antimafia (National Anti-Mafia Directorate), its operations include preemptive investigations, judicial investigations, and international relations. It investigates the characteristics, objectives, and methods of the Mafia, as well as their domestic and international contacts.

The DIA was created to prevent mafiosi from infiltrating the government.

=== SCIP ===
Interpol's National Central Bureau for Italy is part of the International Police Cooperation Service (SCIP), a branch of the Public Security Department (PSD). SCIP is a multi-agency unit headed on a rotational basis by the Polizia di Stato, Carabinieri and Guardia di Finanza. Officers representing all police forces staff it.

=== Direzione Centrale per i Servizi Antidroga ===
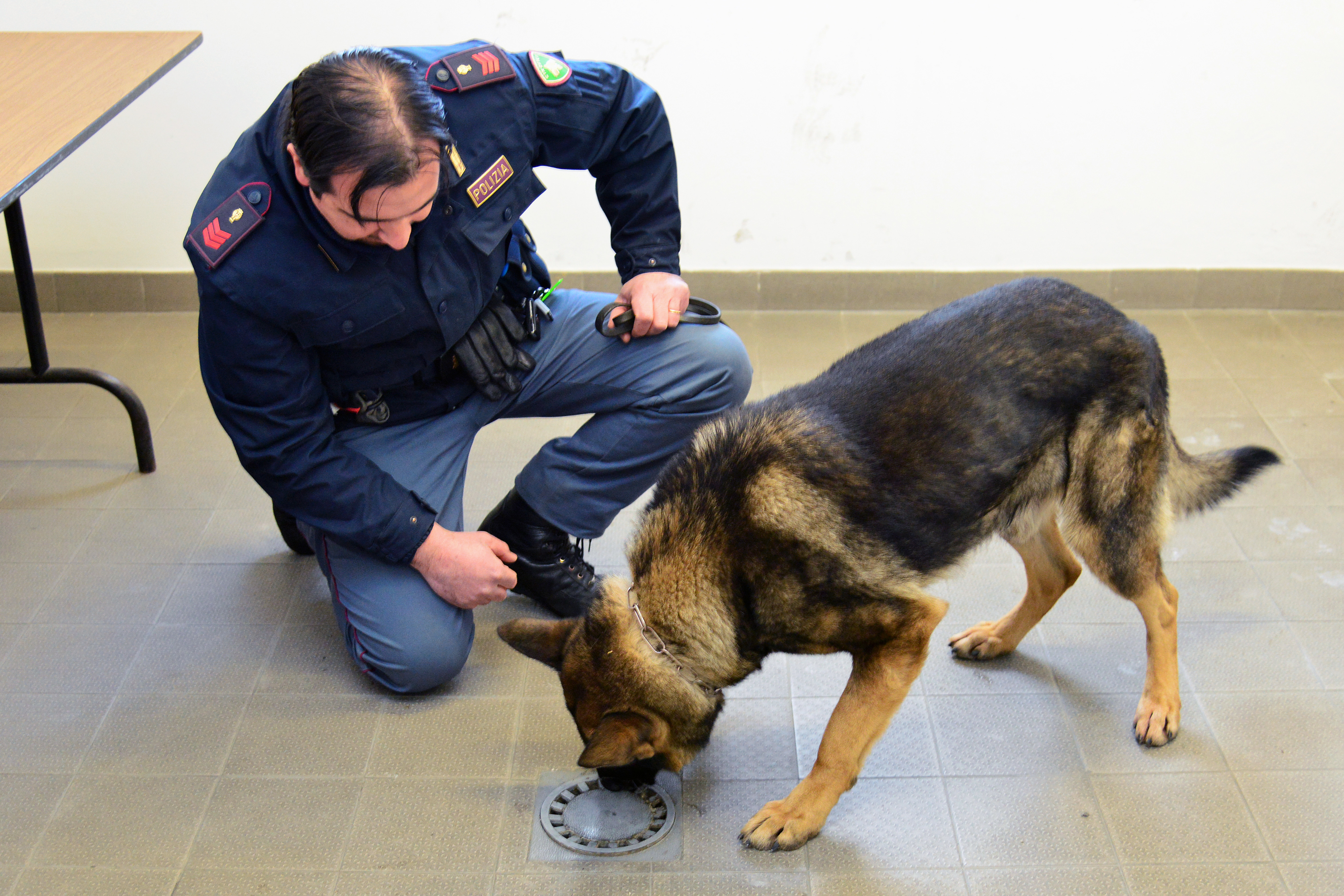
Italian military detection dog, with the Police K9 Unit from Padua, inspecting a room for drug residues at the Caserma Ederle, in Vicenza.

The Direzione Centrale per i Servizi Antidroga (Central Directorate for Anti-Drug Services) is a joint organization of Polizia di Stato, Carabinieri, and Guardia di Finanza combating drug trafficking. Founded in 1976 as Direzione Anti Droga (Anti-Drug Directorate), it is under the authority of the Criminal police department of the Ministry of the Interior.

== Local Police forces ==
While policing in Italy is predominantly a national responsibility, a significant component is also provided by Polizia Locale (Local Police), encompassing a variety of agencies operating at the provincial, regional, and municipal levels. These forces address local needs and enforce regional and municipal regulations, complementing the work of the national police forces.

=== Municipal Police ===
The most widespread form of local policing is the Polizia Locale, also commonly referred to as Polizia Municipale (municipal police); other denominations include Polizia Comunale, Polizia Urbana and Vigili Urbani. Each comune (municipality) in Italy has its own Polizia Locale. Their primary responsibilities include traffic control, enforcing local bylaws and regulations related to commerce, public order, and urban environment, and handling permits and licenses. Municipal police also serve as auxiliary public safety forces, contributing to local crime prevention and community policing initiatives within their geographically restricted jurisdiction. Uniforms and equipment of the Polizia Locale can vary considerably across different regions and municipalities.

The origins of Italian municipal policing can be traced back to ancient Rome with the vigili urbani and comes stabili. During the medieval period, urban policing concepts further developed in Italian comunes in the 13th and 14th centuries. These early forms of organized urban law enforcement share some functional similarities with modern police forces, despite being established centuries before the formalization of modern policing.

=== Provincial Police (Polizia Provinciale) ===
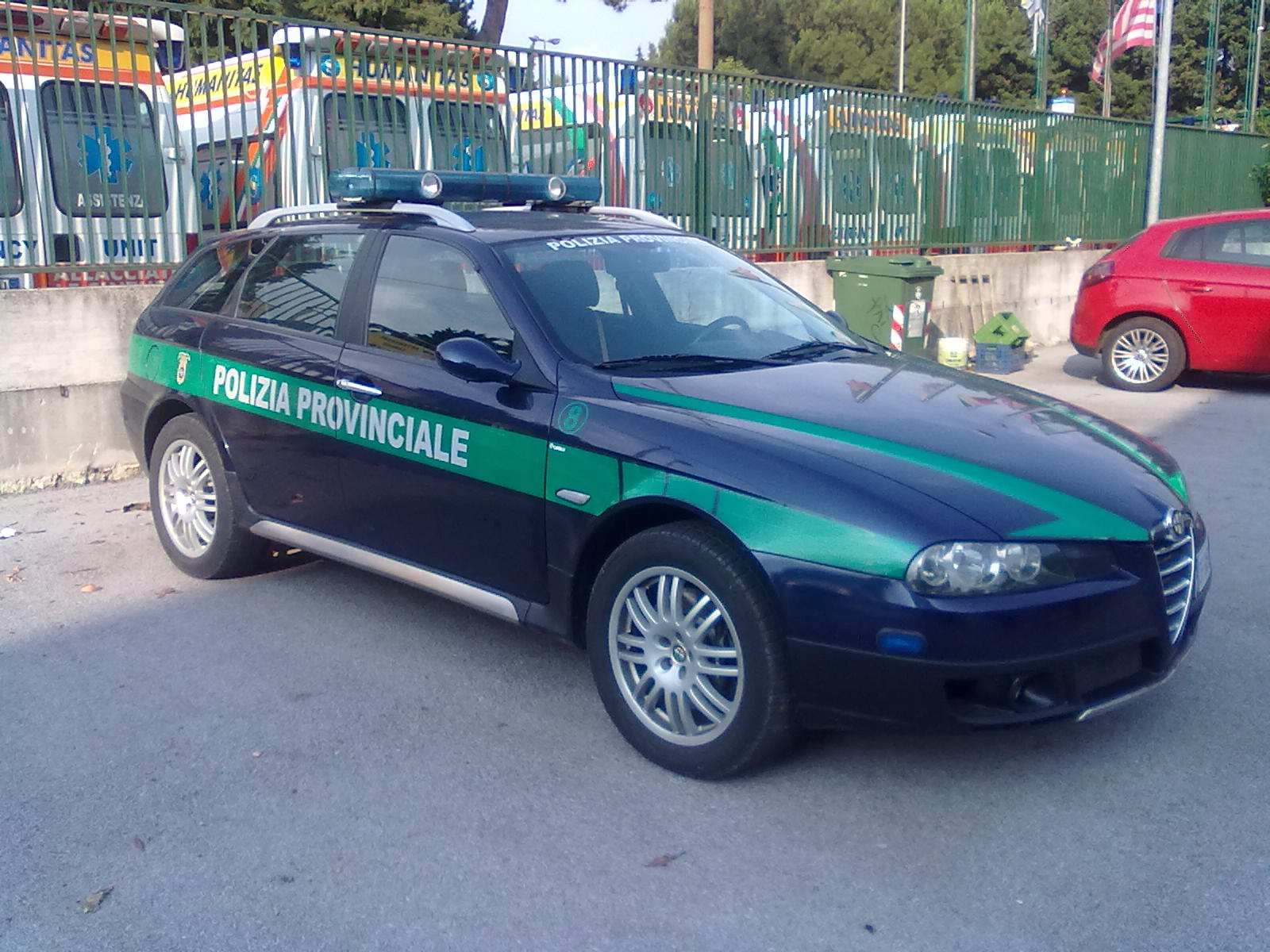
Polizia Provinciale car (2013)

In addition to municipal forces, some of the 107 Provinces of Italy also maintain a Polizia Provinciale (Provincial Police). These are smaller agencies with a focus on specialized areas of law enforcement within the provincial territory. Their core functions include enforcing regional and national hunting and fishing regulations, wildlife management, and environmental protection. Polizia Provinciale officers also conduct traffic policing, particularly on provincial roads, and contribute to broader security services as directed by provincial authorities.

=== In autonomous regions ===
Some Autonomous Regions have special local police forces answering to the Regional Government, with jurisdiction covering the entire regional territory or the municipality. Their regulations are similar to other local police, but their activities and authority may differ.

==== Sardinia ====
Sardinia does not have Corpo Forestale officers. Regional law regarding nature, parks, fire, and forestry is carried out by its own regional Corpo forestale e di vigilanza ambientale, established in 1985.

Due to its agricultural and pastoral society, every Sardinian town has both Polizia Municipale and Corpo Barracellare, a volunteer civilian corps. When needed by the municipality, the Corpo Barracellare deals with animal theft, farm robbery, and other farm damages.

== Animal Protection ==
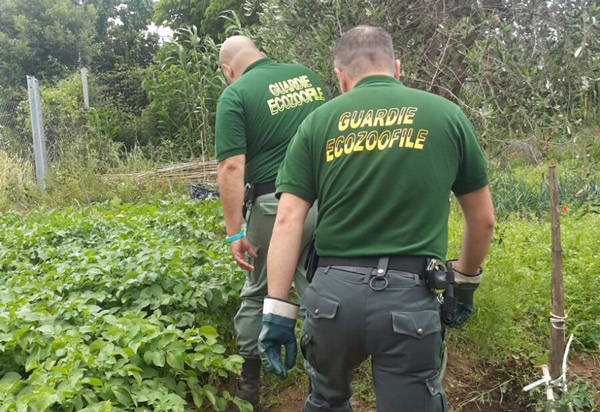
Volunteers of the Guardie Zoofile

In some areas, an animal protection force, or Guardie Zoofile, rescues animals in distress and protects animals and wildlife. Agents are trained volunteer private citizens with limited powers regarding animal safety.

Law number 189 of July 20, 2004, concerning animal abuse, assigns judicial police functions and qualifications to guards of protectionist and zoophile associations. Agents (recognized by decree issued by the Prefecture) do not have jurisdiction in hunting matters.

Agents ensure compliance with all animal-related municipal, regional, and national laws, and may report violations to the Carabinieri, Polizia di Stato, Polizia Locale, or Forestry Carabinieri.

=== Equipment ===
Agents generally wear green uniforms, distinct from the Guardia di Finanza and Polizia Locale. Similar to various local police forces, they may wear combinations of:

- Beret, mountain cap, or baseball cap (green or black)
- Shirt or polo shirt (green or black)
- Cargo trousers (green or black)
- Bomber jacket (green or black)
- Boots (black)
- Duty belt, with radio, handcuffs, gloves, etc.

Some agents carry firearms (pistols), while others do not, with differing opinions on the matter.

Some agents wear a more formal uniform, a suit similar to Guardia di Finanza and Polizia uniforms.

Guardie Zoofile vehicles are generally marked and equipped with blue lights and sirens.

== Historical ==
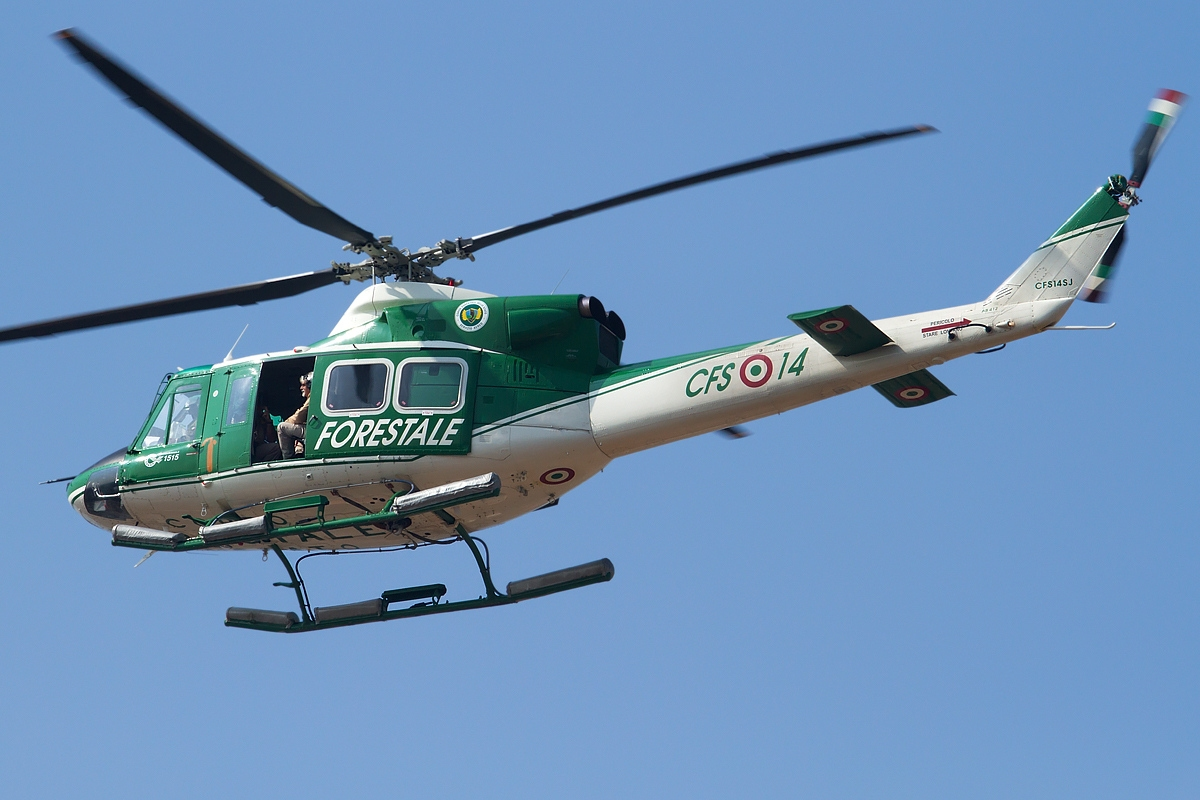
Former Corpo Forestale dello Stato (2013)

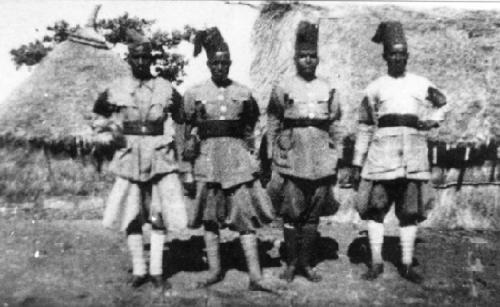
Group of Zaptié in Italian Somaliland (1939)

Force	English translation	Type	Era	Former jurisdictions	
Organizzazione di Vigilanza Repressione dell'Antifascismo	Organization for Vigilance in Repression of Anti-Fascism	Secret police	1927 - 1945	Kingdom of Italy Italian Social Republic	
Corpo di Polizia Repubblicana	Republican Police Corps	Civilian police	1943 - 1945	Italian Social Republic	
Guardia Nazionale Repubblicana	National Republican Guard	Gendarmerie	1943 - 1945	Italian Social Republic	
Polizia dell'Africa Italiana	Police of Italian Africa	Civilian police	1936 - 1944	Italian East Africa	
Zaptié	N/A	Gendarmerie	1889 - 1960	Italian East Africa	
Corpo Forestale dello Stato	State Forestry Corps	Park ranger	Kingdom of Italy	Italian Social Republic	Italy

== Private security ==
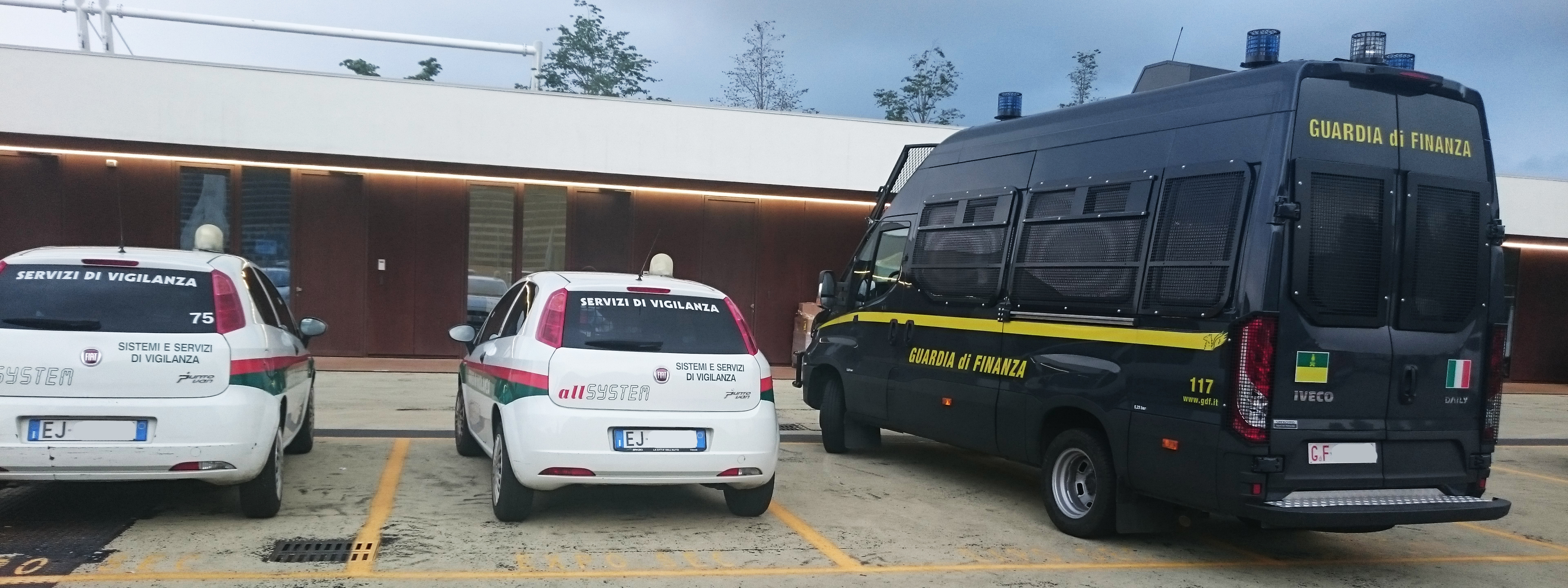
Two private security cars (Fiat Puntos) in Milan 2015 with a Guardia di Finanza van

As with most of Western Europe, private security organizations play a part in security of money, valuables, property and people. In Italy, a guard, or security officer, is known as a Guardia di Sicurezza. They may be part of a private security organization, known as a Servizi di Vigilanza Privata and patrol certain areas or guard buildings.

=== Services ===
- Armed and unarmed guarding at banks, shopping centers, courts, museums, construction sites, leisure places, etc.
- Armed secure transport/cash-in-transit - of money and valuables

=== Requirement ===
Similar to police, in order for citizens to become security agents, they must:

- be an Italian citizen or a citizen of a member state of the European Union;
- have reached the age of majority and have fulfilled military service obligations;
- know how to read and write;
- not having been convicted of a crime;
- be a person of good moral conduct;
- be in possession of an identity card;
- be registered in the national social insurance fund and in the workplace accidents fund
- not have been convicted of criminal activity.

=== Equipment ===
Some guards are armed (generally with pistols), similar to police, but some are not. These are generally semi-automatic pistols, or revolvers. The license to carry this must be obtained from the Prefecture by the private security organization, or the hiring organization. This is subject to weapon-handling competency checks and health checks. Uniforms vary greatly from company to company and are often similar, but distinct, to the state and local police forces. Often marked vehicles are used for security work.

== Transportation ==
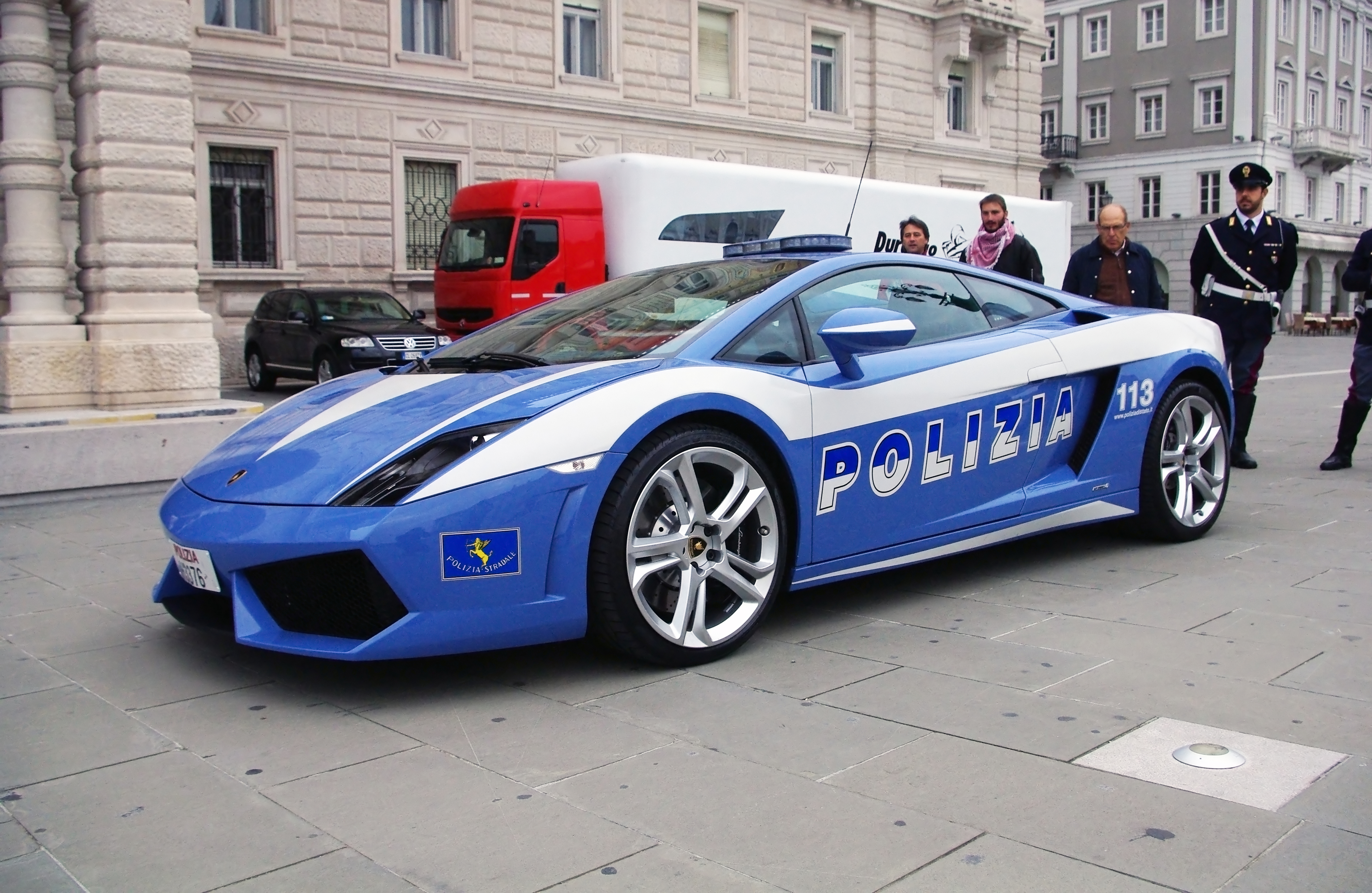
A Lamborghini Gallardo of the Polizia di Stato, used for emergency intervention and transport of organs, parked in Piazza Unità d'Italia in Trieste

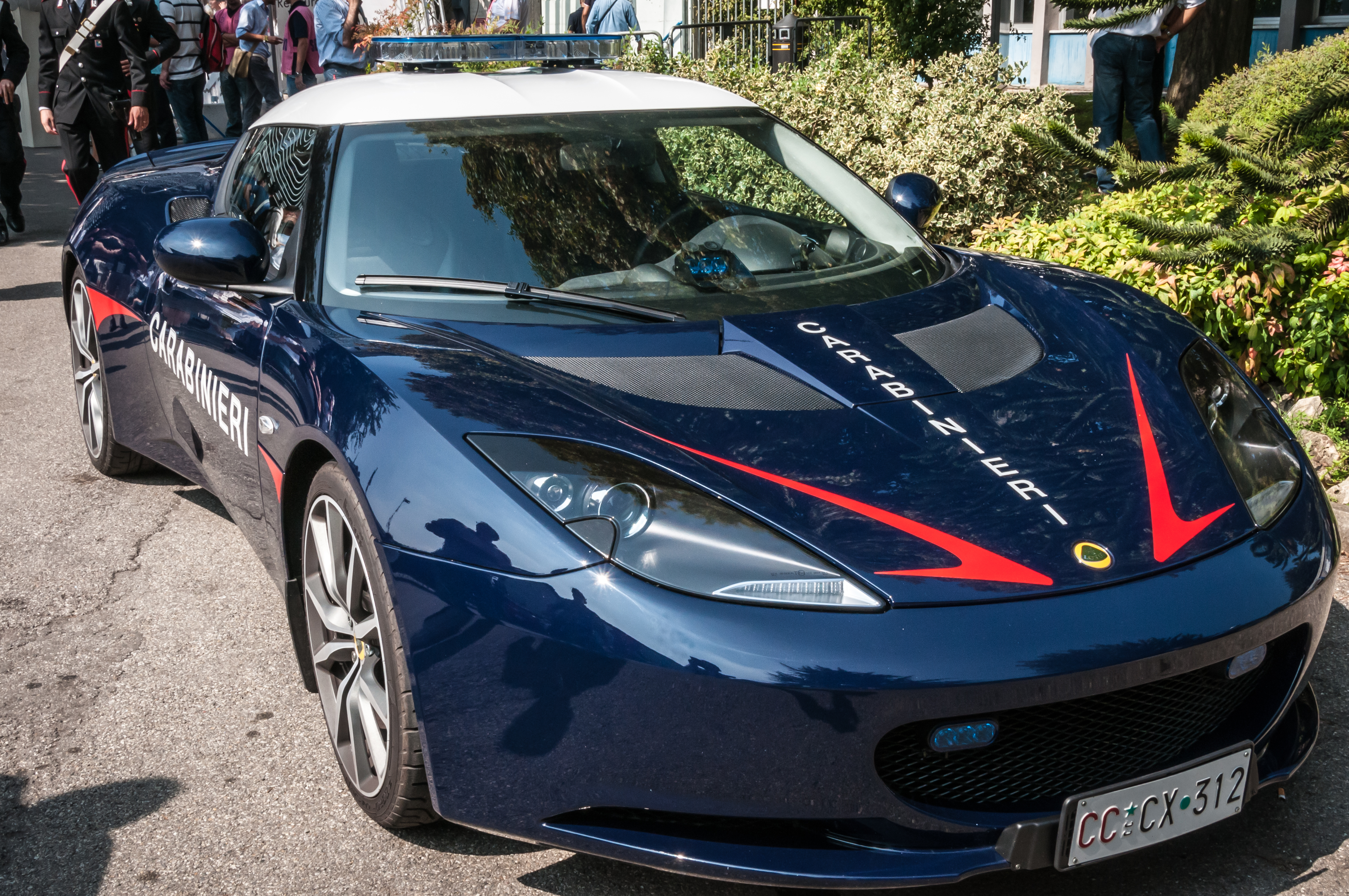
Carabinieri Lotus Evora

Until recently, all Italian police forces were equipped with Italian-made police cars, with Alfa Romeos most commonly. A patrol car belonging to Polizia is nicknamed Pantera (Panther), one used by the Carabinieri is nicknamed Gazzella (Gazelle). Every force has helicopters, trucks and campers (used as mobile offices, usually in undercover missions). In Venice, which is built across several islands linked by bridges and surrounded by water, public security and fire brigades work with boats. In 2004, Lamborghini donated two Lamborghini Gallardo police cars to the Polizia di Stato on their 152nd anniversary.

- Arma dei Carabinieri patrol vehicles are dark blue with a red stripe along the side. Majority have white roofs. Their telephone number is also featured - "112" (whilst that of the Polizia di Stato is "113"). Their vehicles have registration plates beginning with "CC". Precedently, Carabinieri cars were dark green: the last green (and the first black) Carabinieri car was the Alfa Romeo Giulia.
- Guardia di Finanza vehicles are dark grey with a thin gold stripe along each side and the words Guardia di Finanza in gold underneath. The vehicle plates begin with the letters "GdiF" in red.
- Polizia di Stato vehicles are light blue with a white stripe along the side and the word POLIZIA in large letters underneath. The license plates start with the word Polizia in red usually followed by a letter and four numbers. Like the Carabinieri vehicles, the cars were green, but before the green colour, the cars were red.
- Polizia Penitenziaria vehicles are dark blue with a light blue stripe along the side and Polizia Penitenziaria in white letters under the stripe. License plates have the entire name POLIZIA PENITENZIARIA on them, followed by three numbers and two letters.
- Corpo Forestale dello Stato vehicles were green with a white stripe and the words CORPO FORESTALE DELLO STATO in white along the side. The vehicle plates began with the letters "CFS" in red. From January 2017 all vehicles have been transferred under the Carabinieri's Comando unità per la tutela forestale, ambientale e agroalimentare. The words "CORPO FORESTALE DELLO STATO" has been replaced with "CARABINIERI", but they still remain green with a white stripe.
- Polizia Provinciale vehicles are white with a green horizontal stripe along the side.
- Polizia Municipale the colours of vehicles depend on regional laws. Usually, the cars are white with blue, green or red stripes and the words "Polizia Municipale" or "Polizia Locale" along the side, in some regions car colour can be black or dark grey. License plates have the entire name POLIZIA LOCALE on them and the letter "Y" followed by another letter, three numbers, and two letters.

== Gallery ==
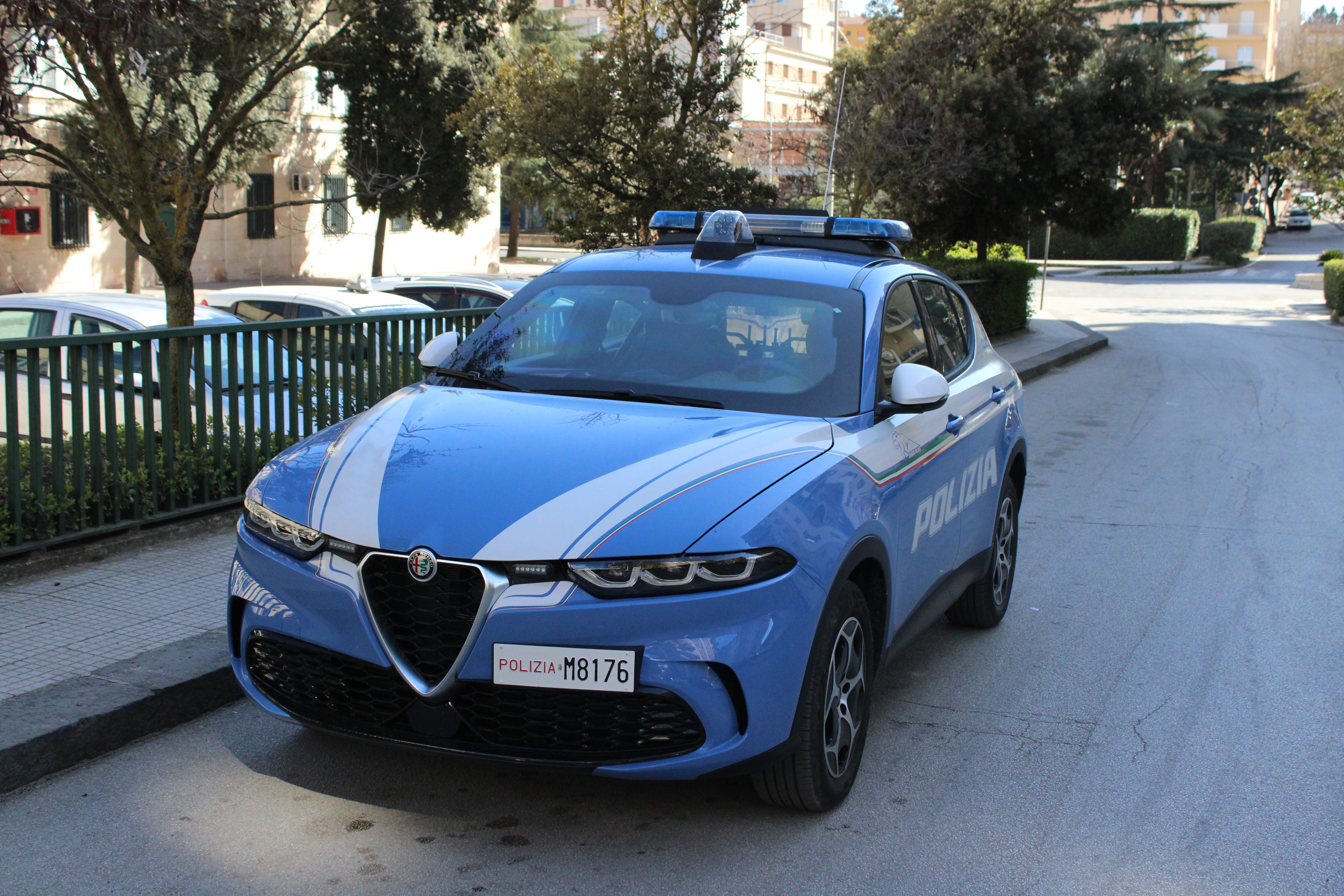
Polizia di Stato Alfa Romeo Tonale

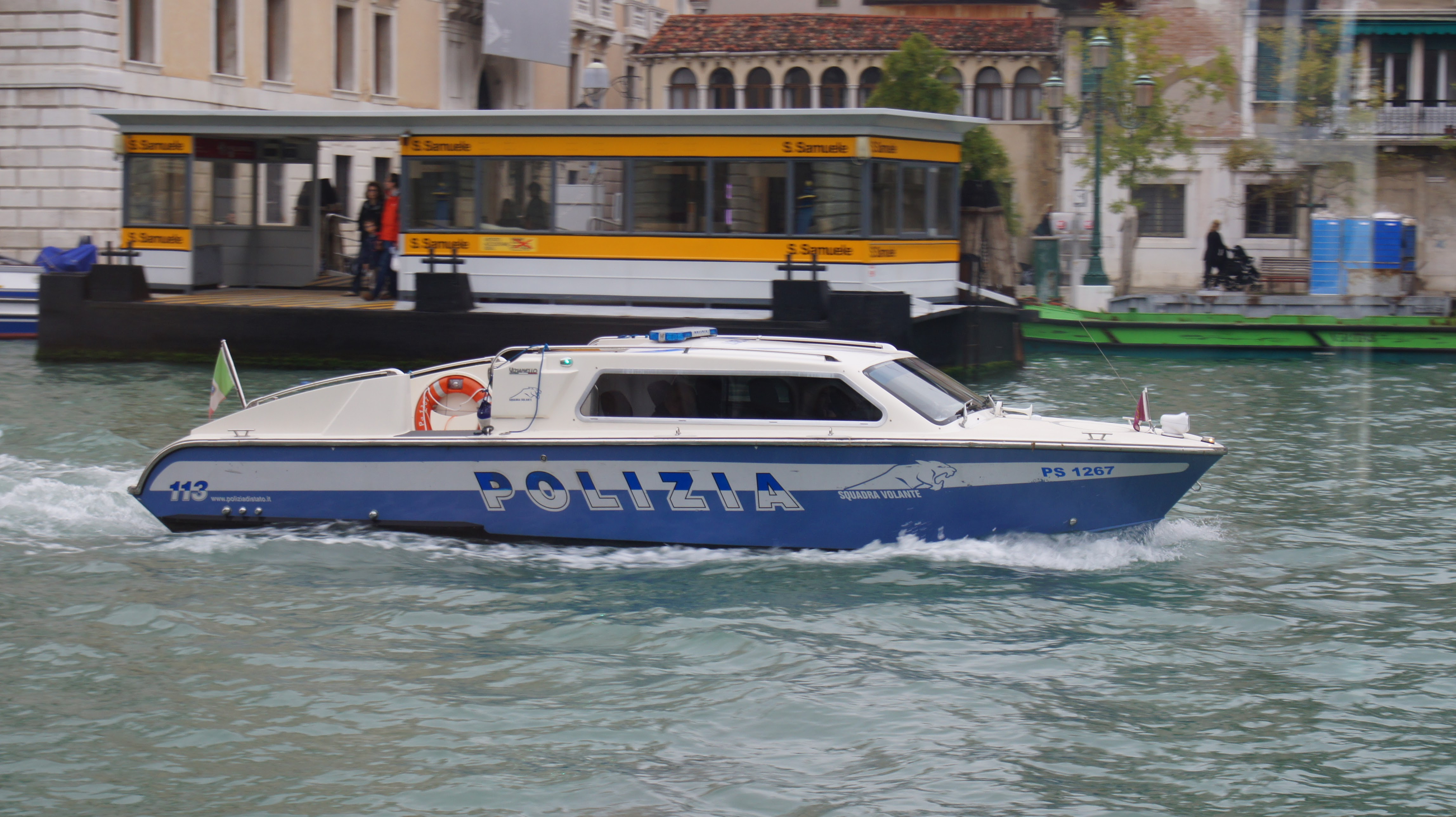
A Polizia di Stato boat in Venice

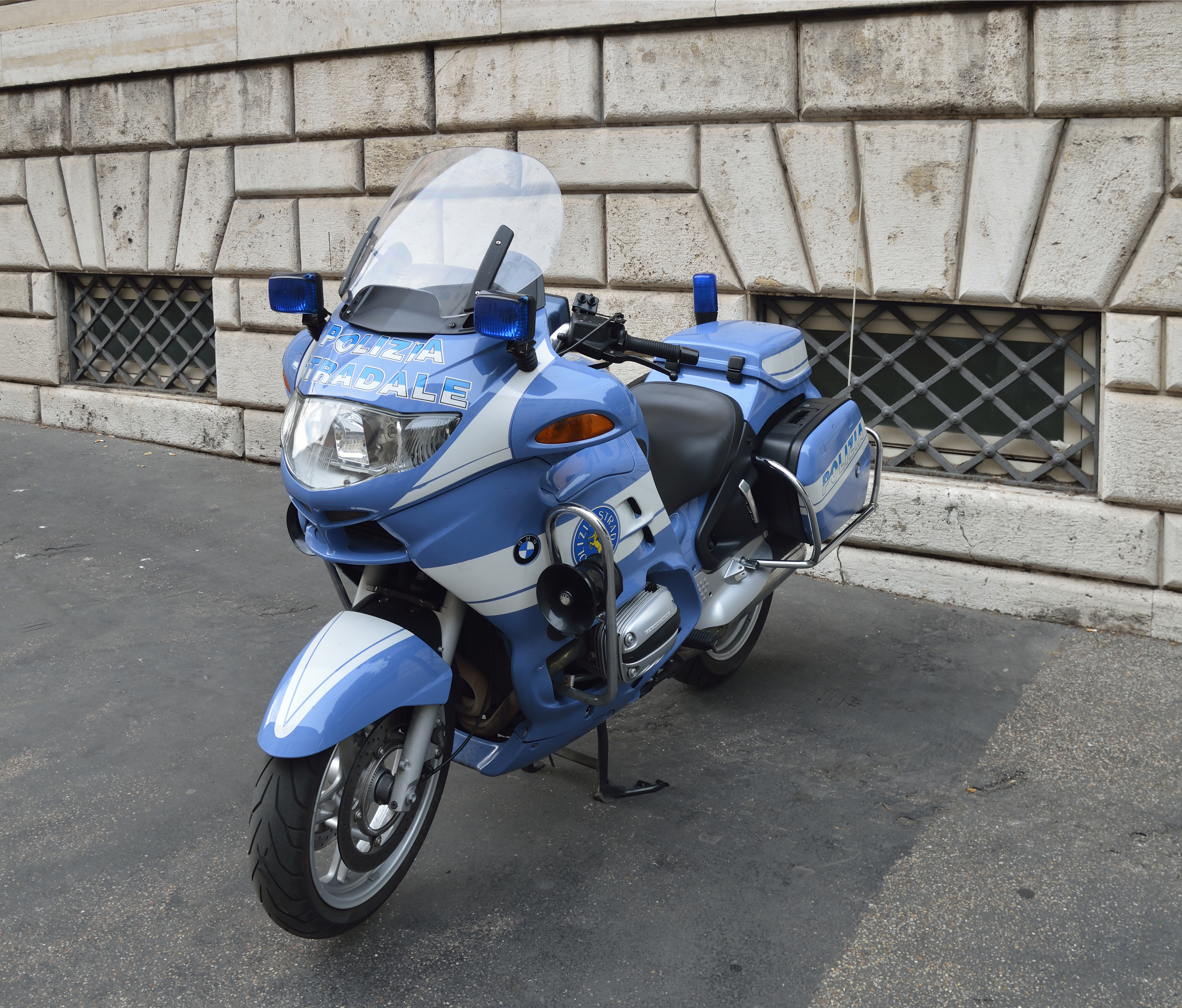
Polizia di Stato motorcycle

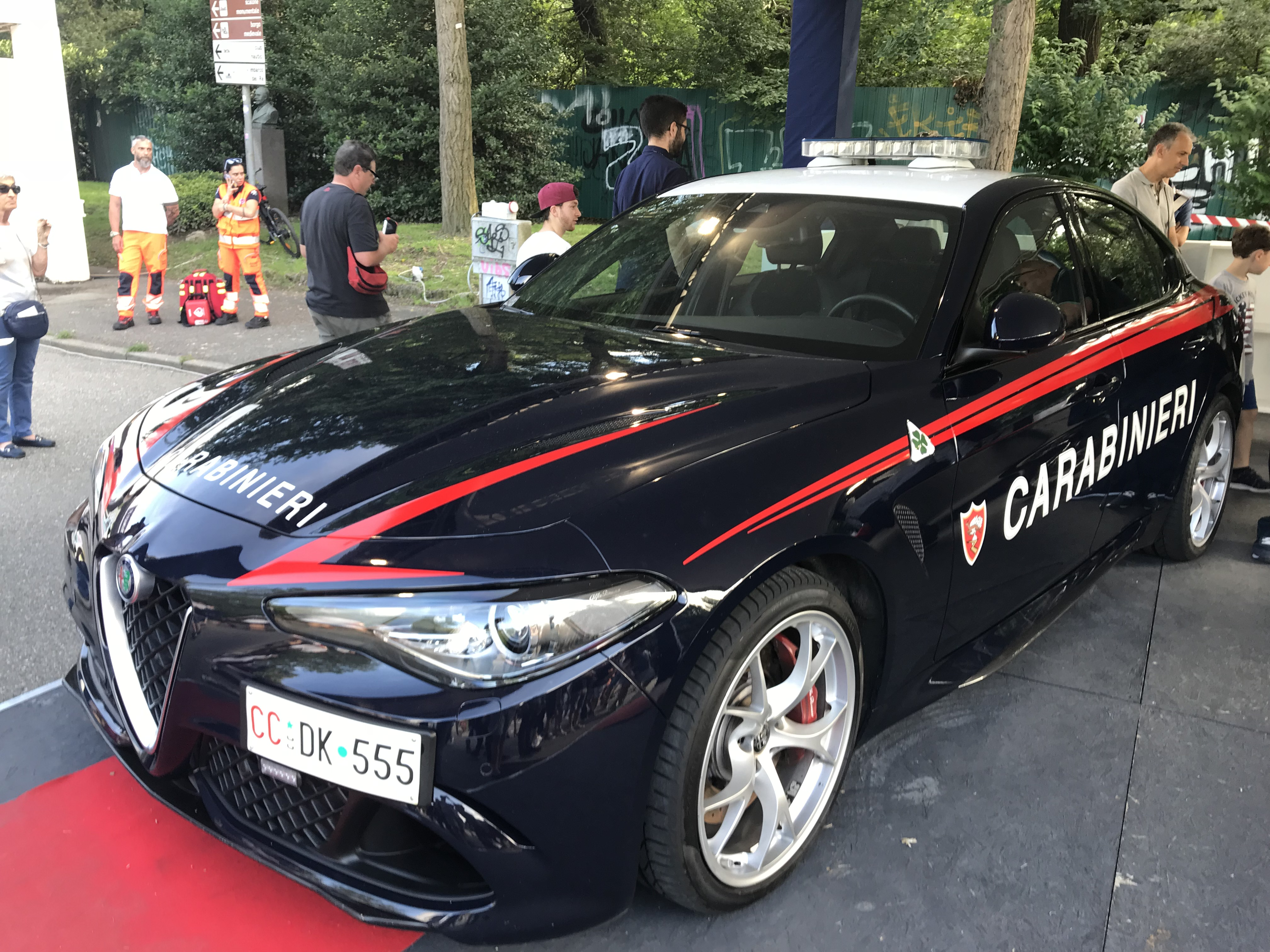
Carabinieri Alfa Romeo Giulia

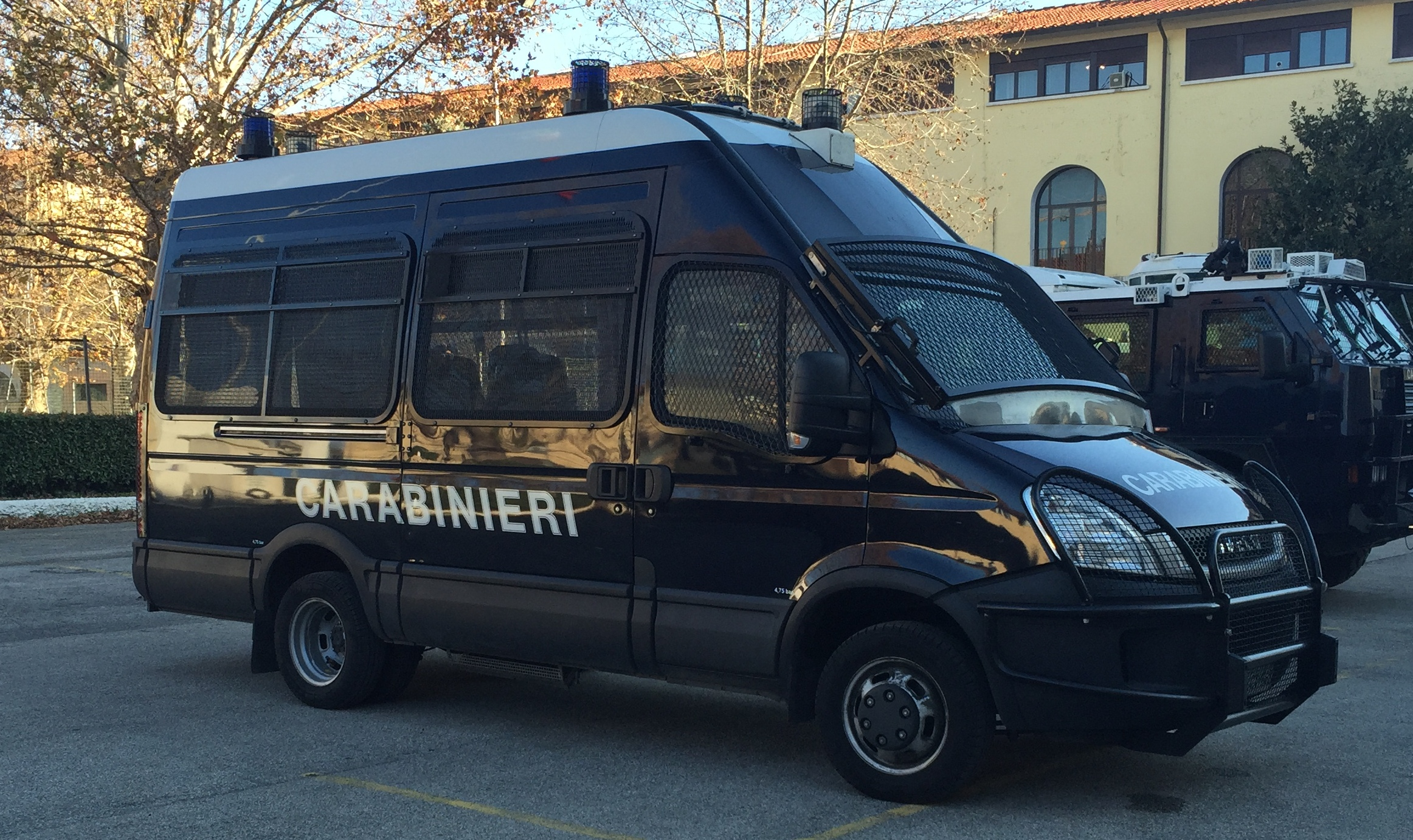
Carabinieri Iveco Daily, used for emergency intervention and transport of organs

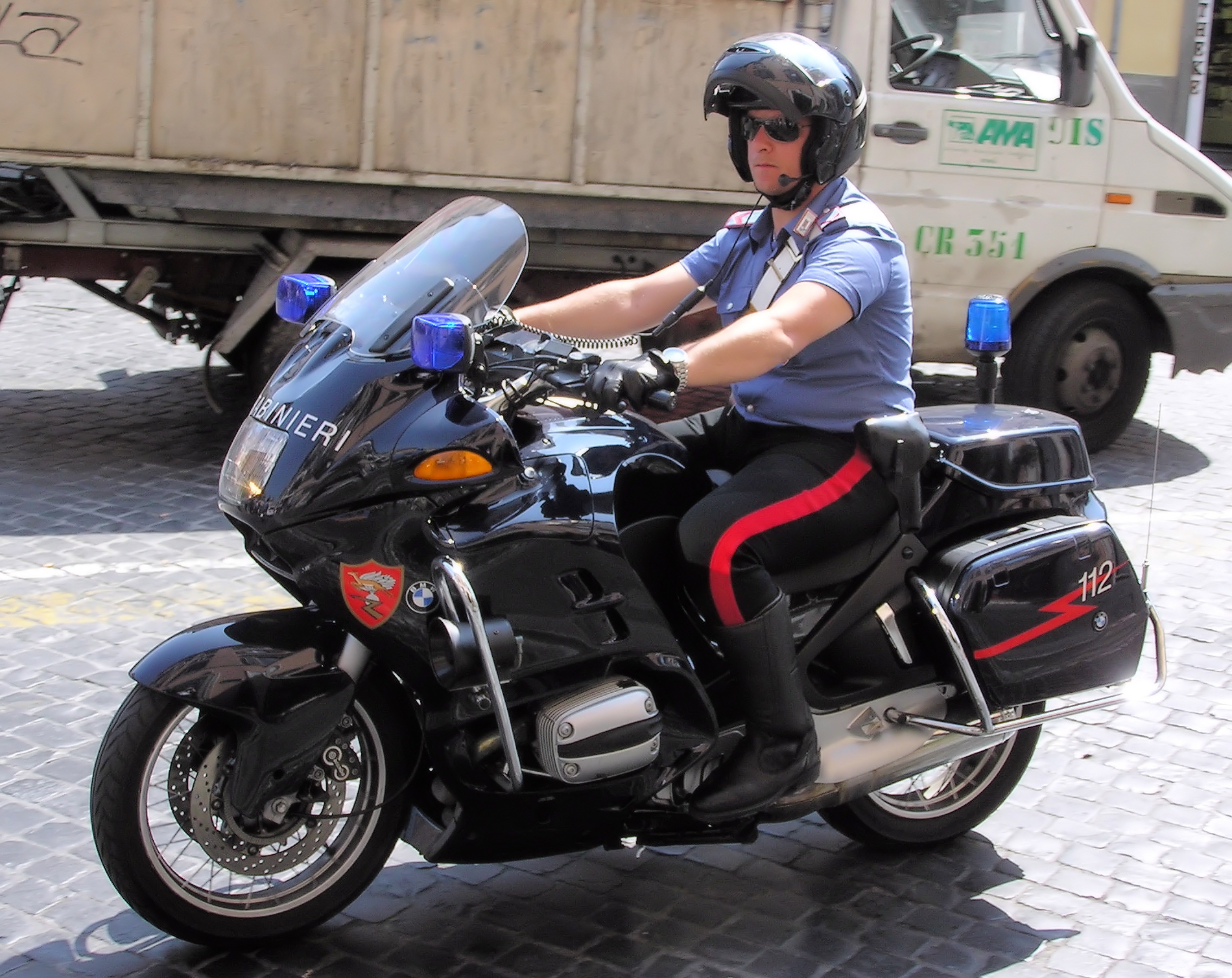
Carabinieri motorcycle

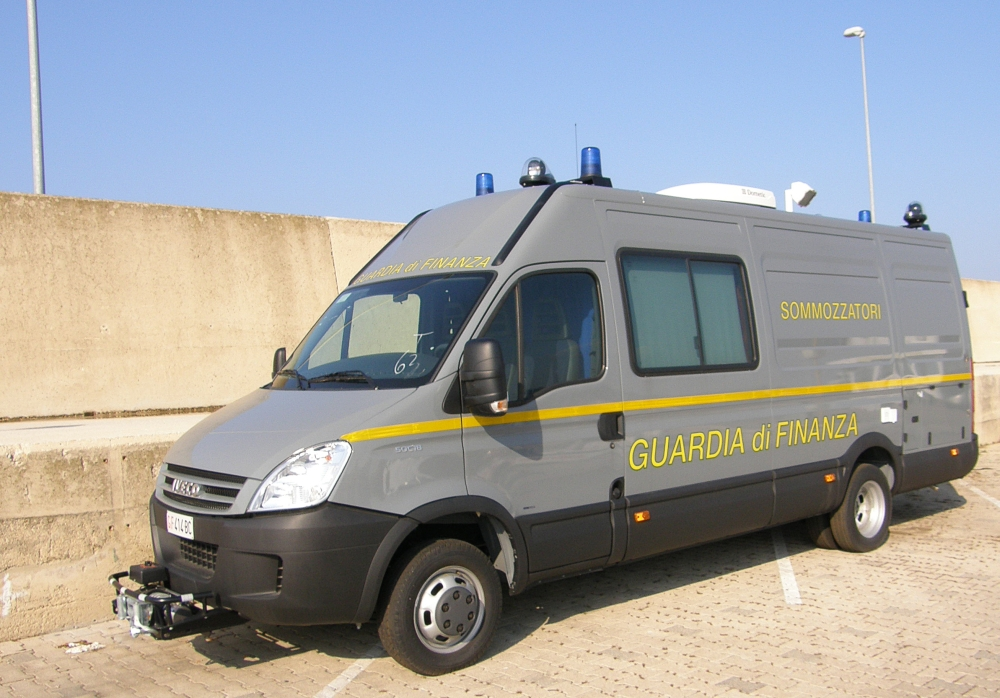
Guardia di Finanza Iveco Daily

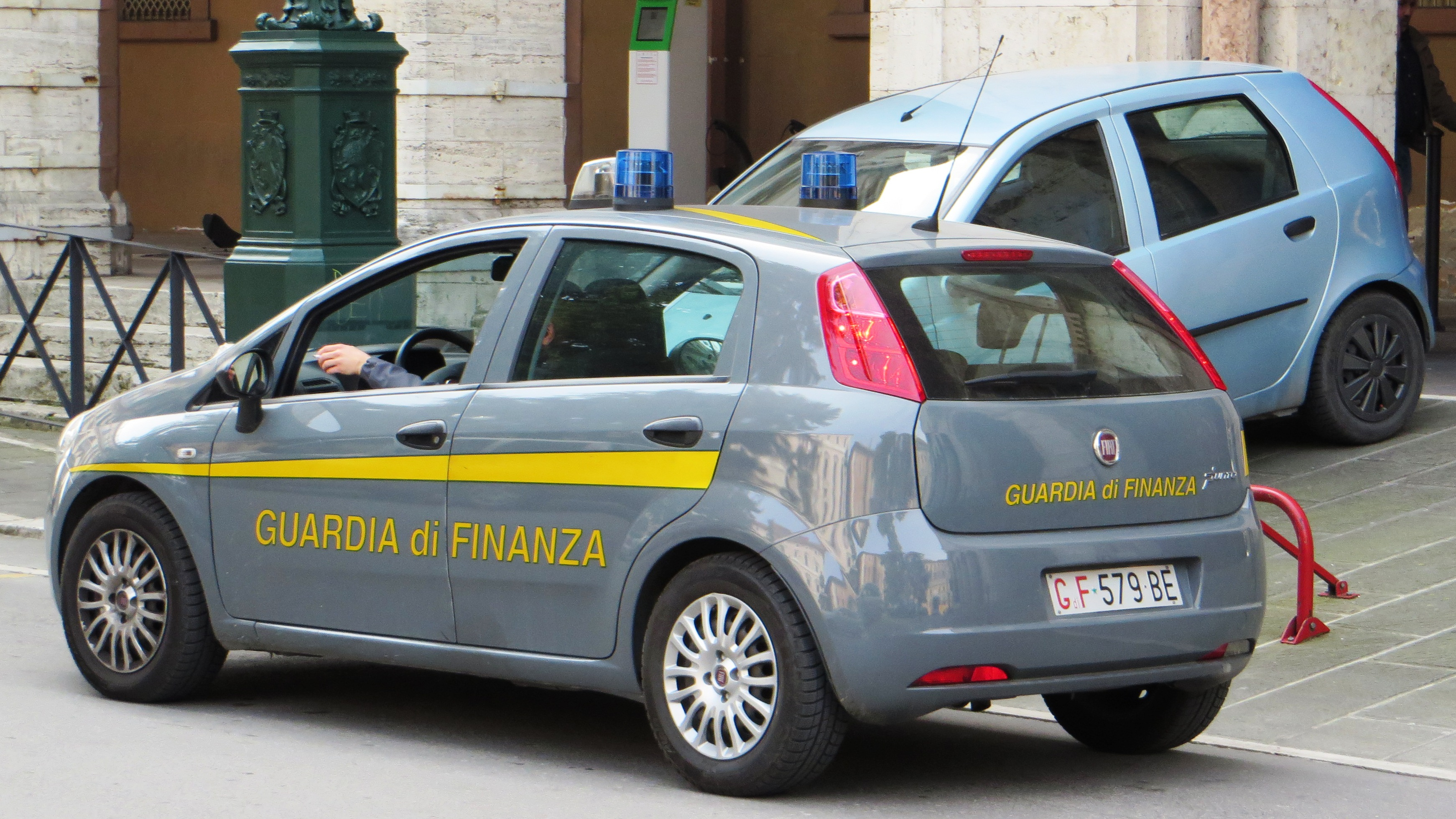
Guardia di Finanza Fiat Grande Punto

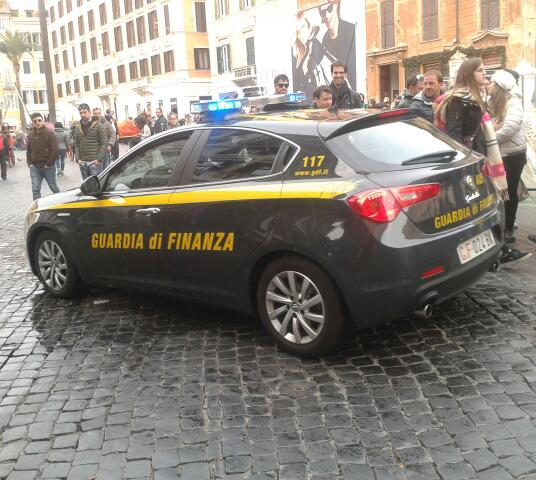
Guardia di Finanza Alfa Romeo Giulietta

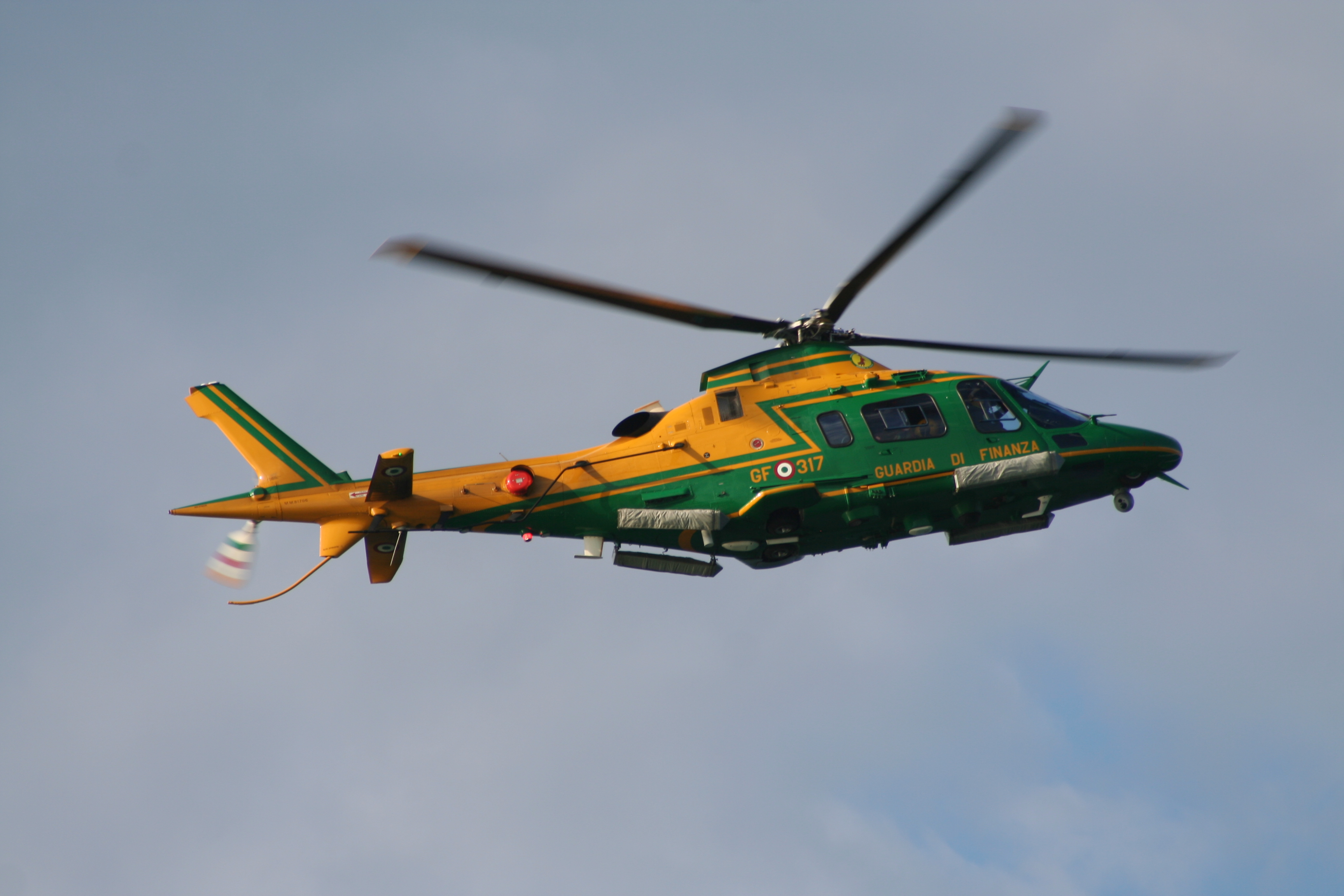
Guardia di Finanza helicopter

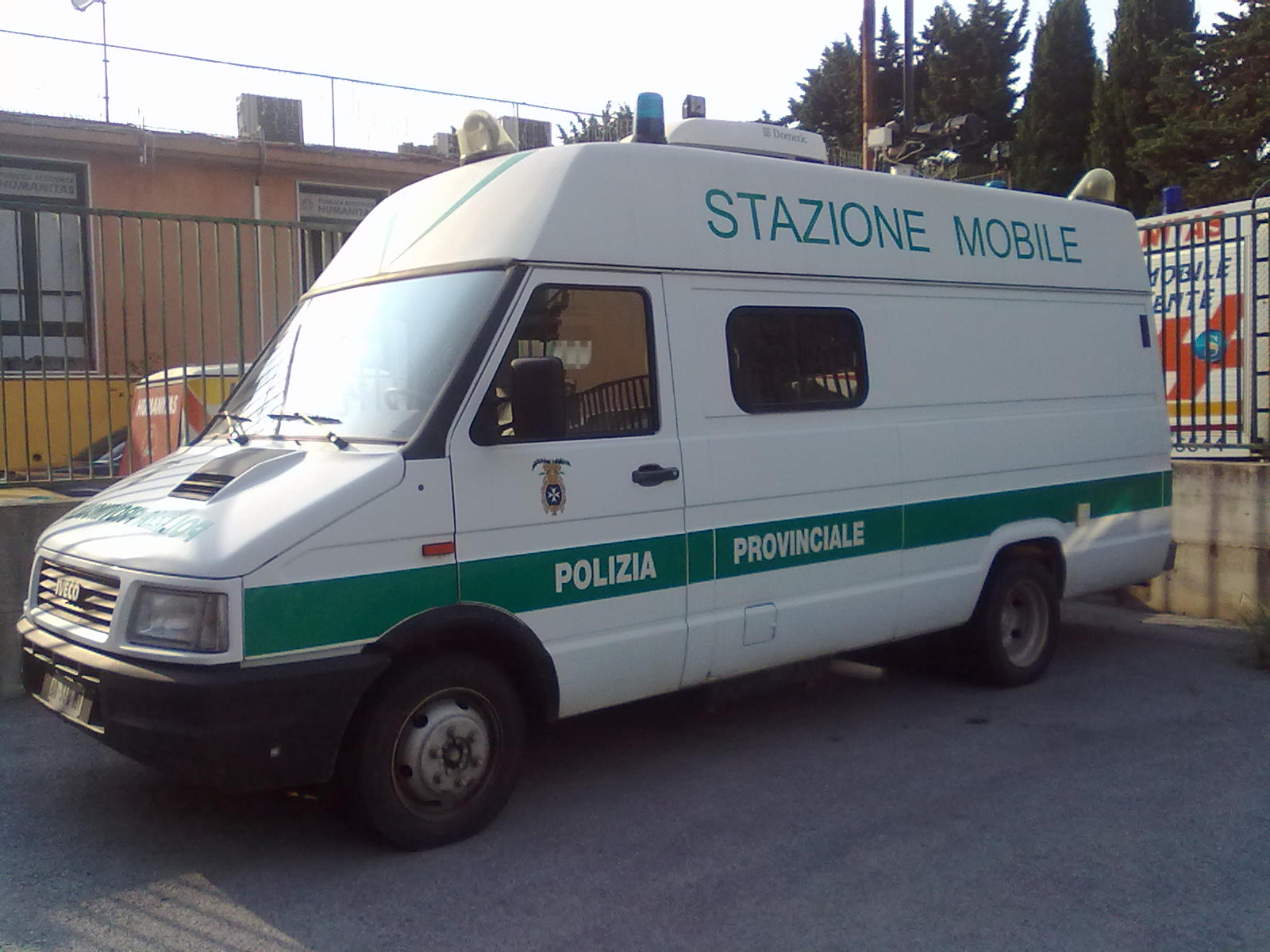
Iveco Daily Polizia Provinciale mobile cell site

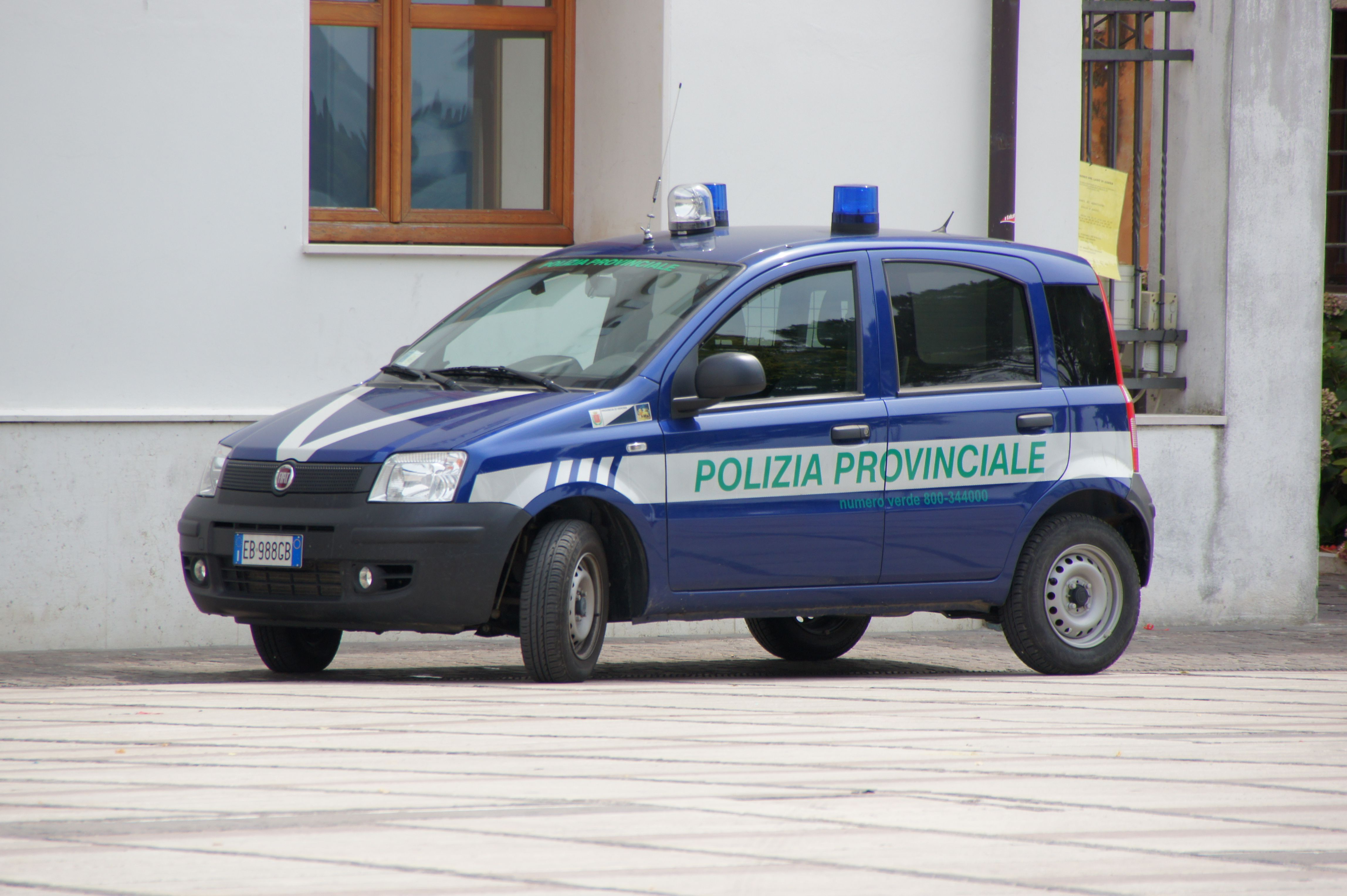
Polizia Provinciale Fiat Panda

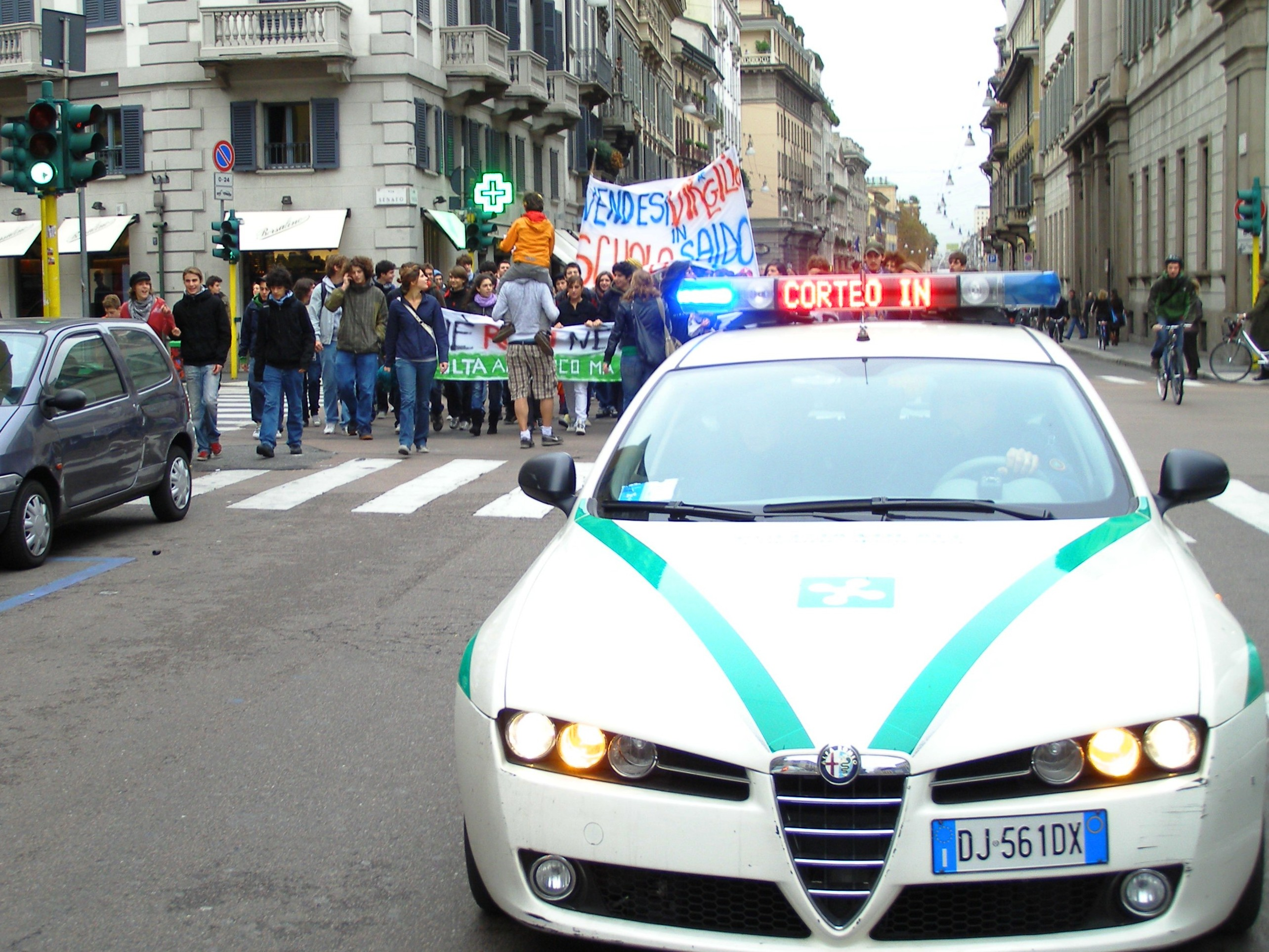
Polizia Locale Alfa Romeo 159

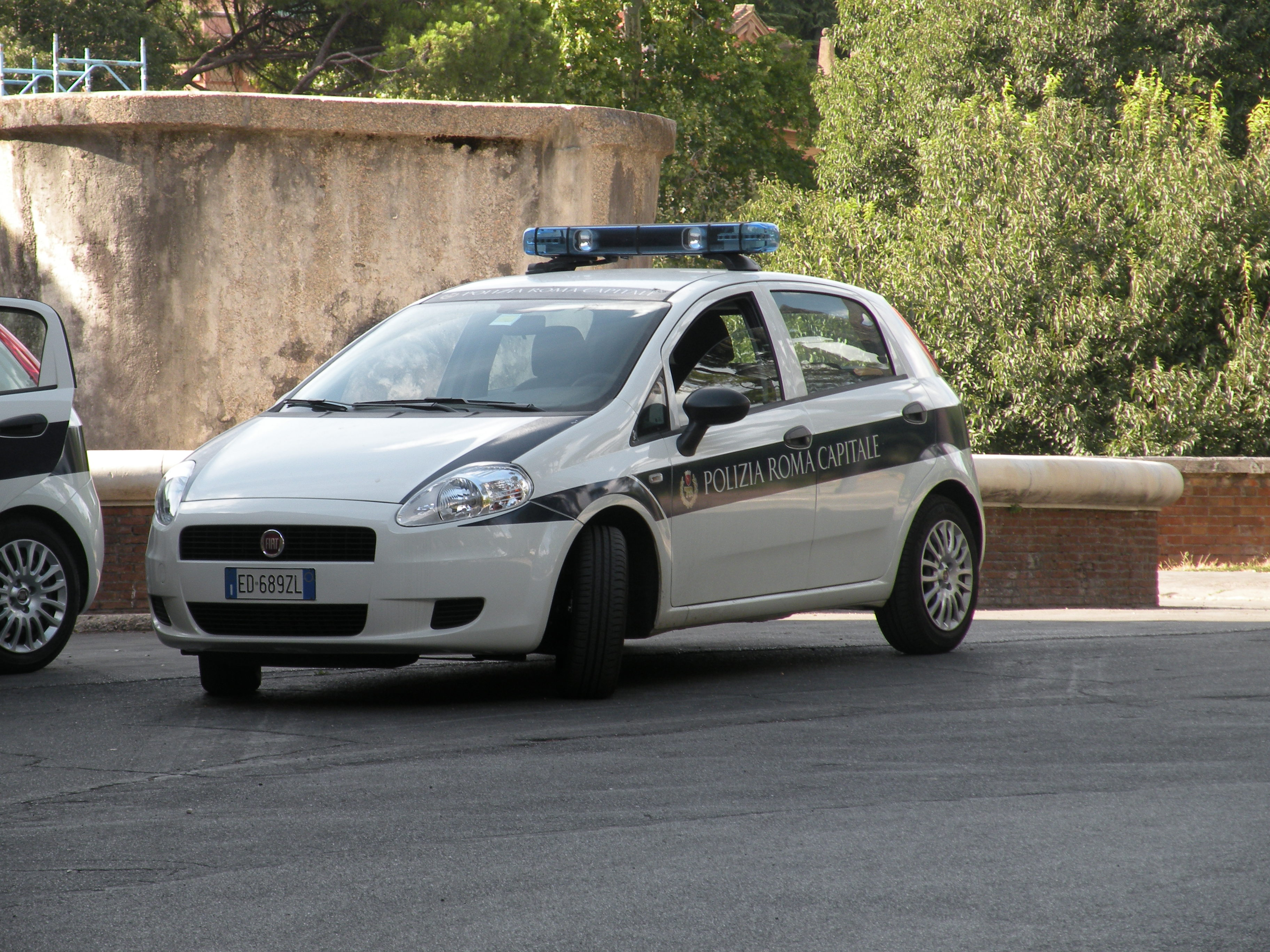
Polizia Municipale Fiat Grande Punto

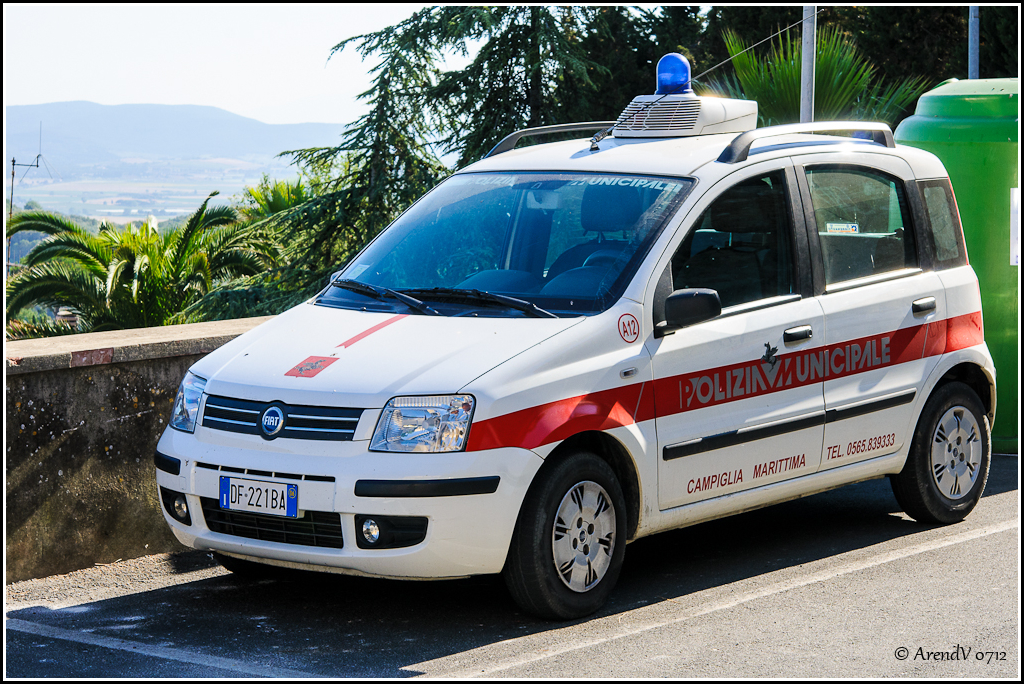
Polizia Municipale Fiat Panda

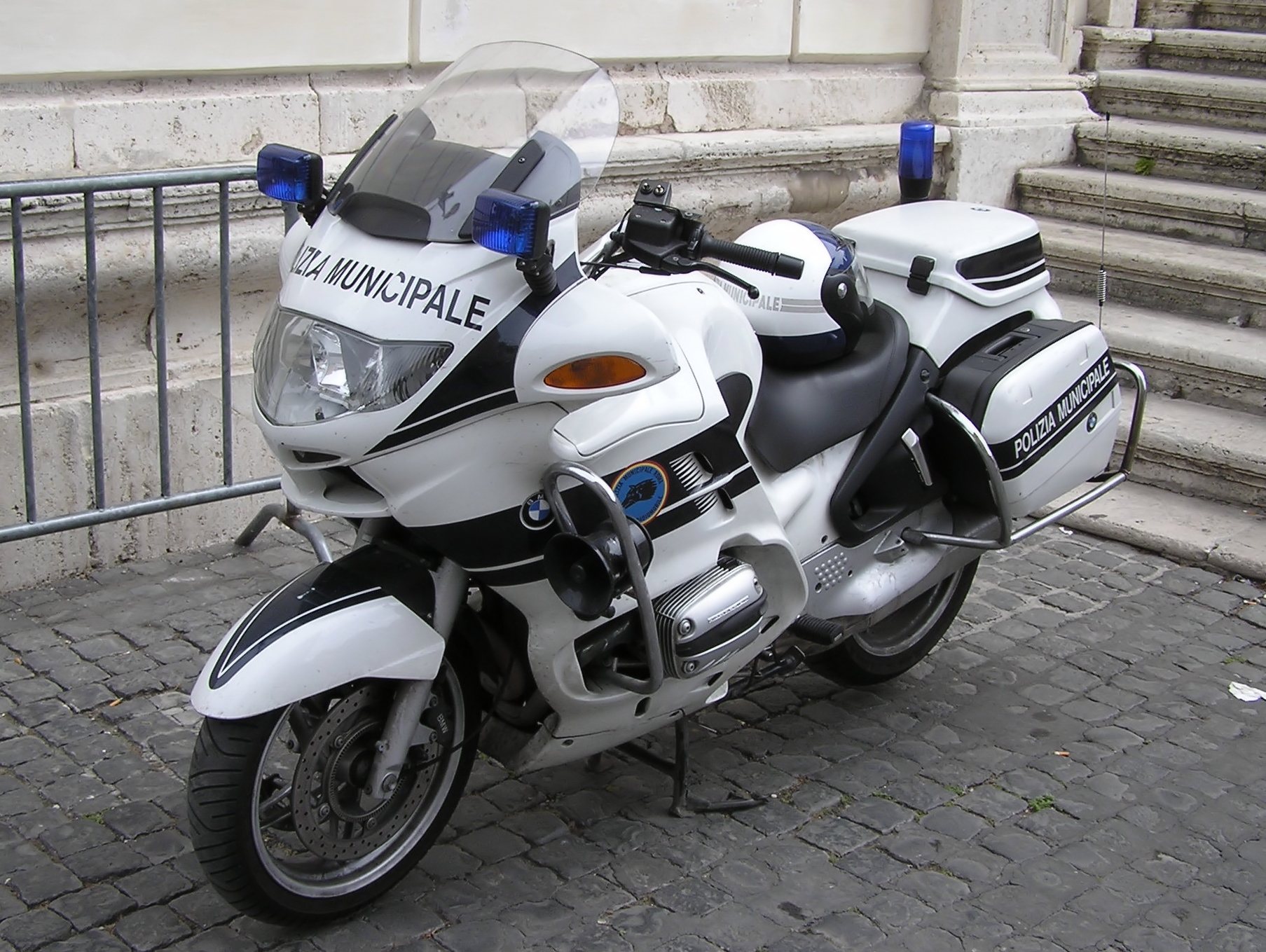
Polizia Municipale motorcycle

== See also ==
- Crime in Italy
- Judiciary of Italy
- Law in Italy
- Organized crime in Italy
