= Fabrizio Nepi =

Italian politician (born 1978)

President of the Province of Siena
- In office 14 October 2014 – 31 October 2018
- Preceded by: Simone Bezzini
- Succeeded by: Silvio Franceschelli

Mayor of Castelnuovo Berardenga
- Incumbent
- Assumed office 26 May 2014
- Preceded by: Roberto Bozzi

Personal details
- Born: 24 July 1978 (age 48) Siena, Tuscany, Italy
- Party: Democratic Party
- Occupation: Surveyor

Fabrizio Nepi (born 24 July 1978) is an Italian politician who served as president of the Province of Siena from 2014 to 2018. A member of the Democratic Party, he has also served as mayor of Castelnuovo Berardenga since 2014.

== Life and career ==
Nepi attended the "Tito Sarrocchi" Industrial Technical School in Siena and has been registered with the provincial register of industrial technical experts since 2000. He has worked for private companies and cooperatives as a surveyor, designer, and project manager of civil and industrial engineering systems.

Nepi was elected to the municipal council of Castelnuovo Berardenga in 2004, being appointed assessor and deputy mayor in 2009. In 2014, he became mayor and re-elected in 2019 and 2024, winning a third consecutive term with 67.24% of the vote.

In October 2014, Nepi was elected president of the Province of Siena in the first election held following the Delrio Law. Supported by the centre-left coalition, he defeated opponent Piero Pii, mayor of Casole d'Elsa, with 72.3% of the weighted vote.

Nepi has served as a provincial councillor since 2019. He supported the presidential candidate Agnese Carletti at the 2024 provincial election.
