= Vasco Calonaci =

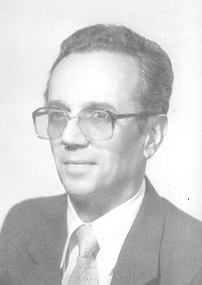

Member of the Chamber of Deputies
- In office 20 June 1979 – 1 July 1987
- Constituency: Siena–Arezzo–Grosseto

President of the Province of Siena
- In office 1975 – 14 May 1979
- Preceded by: Luciano Mencaraglia
- Succeeded by: Mario Barellini

Personal details
- Born: 25 March 1927 San Gimignano, Province of Siena, Kingdom of Italy
- Died: 21 May 1998 (aged 71) Siena, Tuscany, Italy
- Party: Italian Communist Party

Vasco Calonaci (25 March 1927 – 21 May 1998) was an Italian politician of the Italian Communist Party. He served as president of the Province of Siena from 1975 to 1979 and as a member of the Chamber of Deputies from 1979 to 1987, representing the Siena–Arezzo–Grosseto constituency.

He founded the Historical Archive of the Sienese Workers' Movement (ASMOS) in 1984 and served as its president until his death in 1998.
