= List of presidents of the Province of Siena =

President of the Province of Siena
- Presidente della Provincia di Siena
- Incumbent; Agnese Carletti since 30 September 2024
- Residence: Palazzo Reale
- Term length: 4 years
- Inaugural holder: Pandolfo Bargagli Petrucci
- Formation: 1889
- Deputy: Andrea Marrucci

The president of the Province of Siena is the head of the provincial government in Siena, Tuscany, Italy. The president oversees the administration of the province, coordinates the activities of the municipalities, and represents the province in regional and national matters. The provincial government is headquartered in the Palazzo Reale in Siena, where the council chamber is located.

Since September 2024, the office has been held by Agnese Carletti of the Democratic Party, the first female president of the Province of Siena.

== History ==
The Provincial Deputation was established in 1861 following the unification of Italy, serving as the executive branch of the province alongside the Provincial Council, which acts as the legislative body. Until 1889, the role of president of the deputation was held by the prefect. The first president elected in 1889 was Pandolfo Bargagli Petrucci, who served until 1894.

During the Fascist regime (1928–1944), the Provincial Rectorate replaced the deputation, and presidents were appointed by the central government. After World War II, the Provincial Deputation was briefly reinstated (1944–1951) before the modern office of the President of the Province was established in 1951, elected by the Provincial Council.

From 1995 to 2014, the president was elected directly by the citizens of the province. Following the 2014 Delrio reform, presidents are elected by the Assembly of the mayors and municipal councillors of the province's municipalities, and the term of office was reduced from five to four years.

== List ==
=== Presidents of the Provincial Deputation (1889–1928) ===
No.	Portrait	Name	Term of office		Party
No.	Portrait	Name	Start	End	Party
1		Pandolfo Bargagli Petrucci (1837–1924)	1889	1894	
2		Flaminio Pollini (1835–19??)	1894	1906	
3		Carlo Ballati Nerli (1865–19??)	1906	1914	
4		Mario Bianchi Bandinelli (1848–1930)	1914	1920	
5		Arrigo Gianni (1877–19??)	1920	1923	
6		Luigi Pieraccini (1877–1934)	1923	1924	National Fascist Party
7		Luigi Rugani (1868–1936)	1924	1928	National Fascist Party

=== Presidents of the Provincial Rectorate (1928–1944) ===
No.	Portrait	Name	Term of office		Party
No.	Portrait	Name	Start	End	Party
1		Luigi Rugani (1868–1936)	December 1928	1932	National Fascist Party
2		Mario Tadini Buoninsegni (1889–1974)	1933	1937	National Fascist Party
3		Domenico Comporti (1891–1948)	1937	1943	National Fascist Party

=== Presidents of the Province (1951–present) ===
No.	Portrait	Name	Term of office		Party	Election
No.	Portrait	Name	Start	End	Party	Election
1		Virgilio Lazzeroni (1915–2000)	1951	1956	Italian Communist Party	1951
1		Virgilio Lazzeroni (1915–2000)	1956	1960	Italian Communist Party	1956
1		Virgilio Lazzeroni (1915–2000)	1960	1965	Italian Communist Party	1960
1		Virgilio Lazzeroni (1915–2000)	1965	1967	Italian Communist Party	1964
		Peris Brogi (1923–2006)	?	?	Italian Communist Party	?
		Luciano Mencaraglia (1915–2002)	?	1975	Italian Communist Party	?
		Vasco Calonaci (1927–1998)	1975	14 May 1979	Italian Communist Party	1975
		Mario Barellini (b. 1927)	14 May 1979	1980	Italian Communist Party	1975
		Mario Barellini (b. 1927)	1980	?	Italian Communist Party	1980
		Giordano Chechi (b. 1951)	12 July 1985	15 July 1990	Italian Communist Party	1985
		Alessandro Starnini (b. 1956)	18 July 1990	14 June 1995	Italian Communist Party	1990
		Alessandro Starnini (b. 1956)	14 June 1995	14 June 1999	Democratic Party of the Left	1995
		Fabio Ceccherini (b. 1958)	14 June 1999	14 June 2004	Democrats of the Left; Democratic Party	1999
		Fabio Ceccherini (b. 1958)	14 June 2004	8 June 2009	Democrats of the Left; Democratic Party	2004
		Simone Bezzini (b. 1969)	8 June 2009	13 October 2014	Democratic Party	2009
		Fabrizio Nepi (b. 1978)	14 October 2014	31 October 2018	Democratic Party	2014
		Silvio Franceschelli (b. 1970)	31 October 2018	28 July 2022	Democratic Party	2018
–		David Bussagli (b. 1982)	28 July 2022	23 October 2022	Democratic Party	2018
		David Bussagli (b. 1982)	23 October 2022	30 September 2024	Democratic Party	2022
		Agnese Carletti (b. 1985)	30 September 2024	Incumbent	Democratic Party	2024

== Sources ==
- Cifelli, Alberto (2008). L'istituto prefettizio dalla caduta del fascismo all'Assemblea costituente. I Prefetti della Liberazione (PDF). Rome: Scuola Superiore dell'Amministrazione dell'Interno.
- Menichini, Piera (2005). "I presidenti delle Province dall'Unità alla Grande guerra: repertorio analitico". Storia Amministrazione Costituzione (13): 288–289.
- Nicolosi, Gerardo (2003). La Provincia di Siena in età liberale. Repertorio prosopografico dei consiglieri provinciali 1866-1923 (PDF). Siena: DIGIPS.
