= Armaiolo =

- Frazione
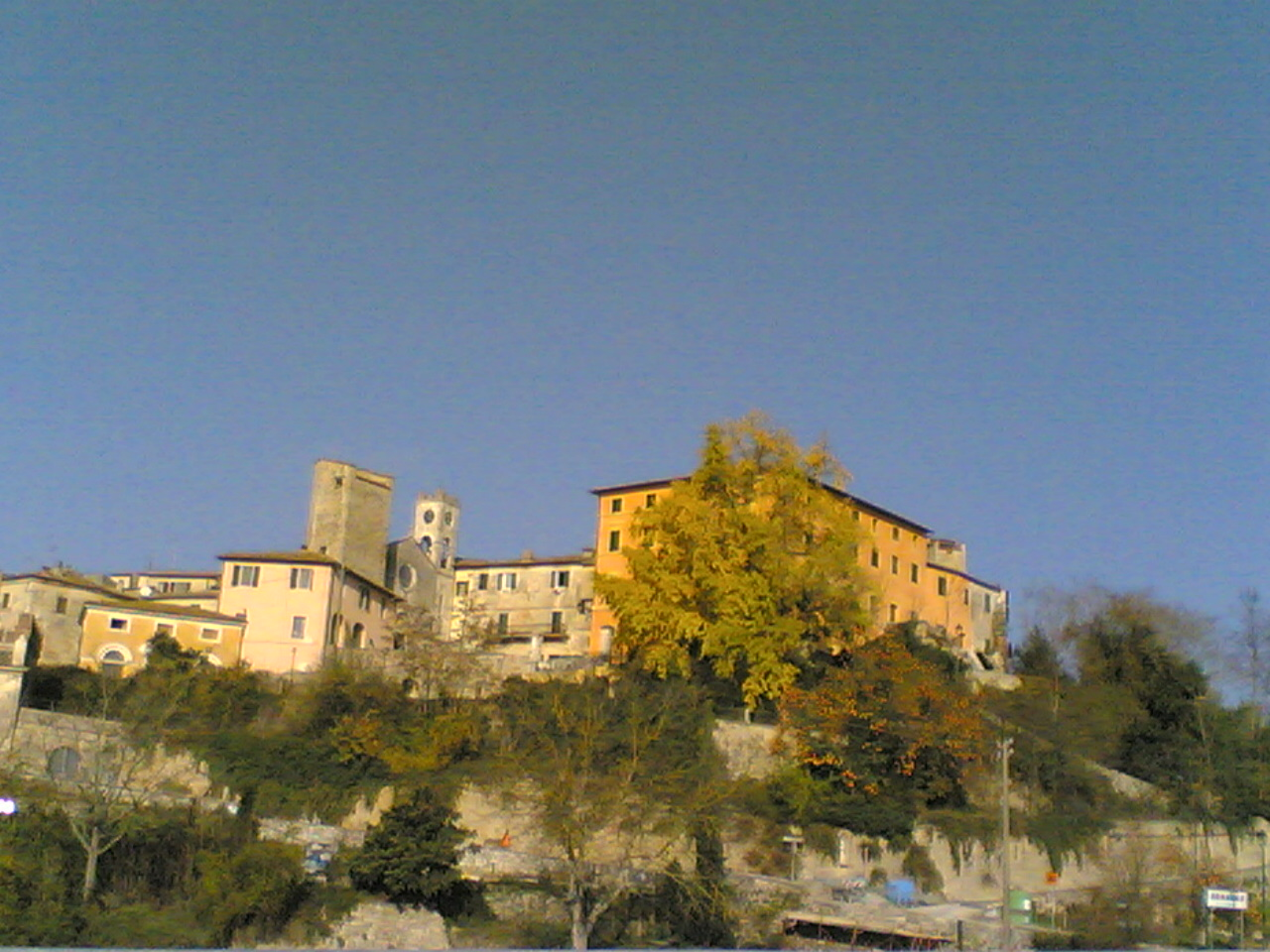
- View of Armaiolo

- Location of Armaiolo in Italy
- Coordinates: 43°18′14″N 11°35′42″E
- Country: Italy
- Region: Tuscany
- Province: Siena (SI)
- Comune: Rapolano Terme
- Elevation: 281 m (922 ft)

Population (2011)
  - Total: 86
- Demonym: Armaiolesi
- Time zone: UTC+1 (CET)
  - Summer (DST): UTC+2 (CEST)

Armaiolo is a village in Tuscany, central Italy, administratively a frazione of the comune of Rapolano Terme, province of Siena. At the time of the 2001 census its population was 79.

Armaiolo is about 26 km from Siena and 2 km from Rapolano Terme.
