= Poggio Santa Cecilia =

- Frazione
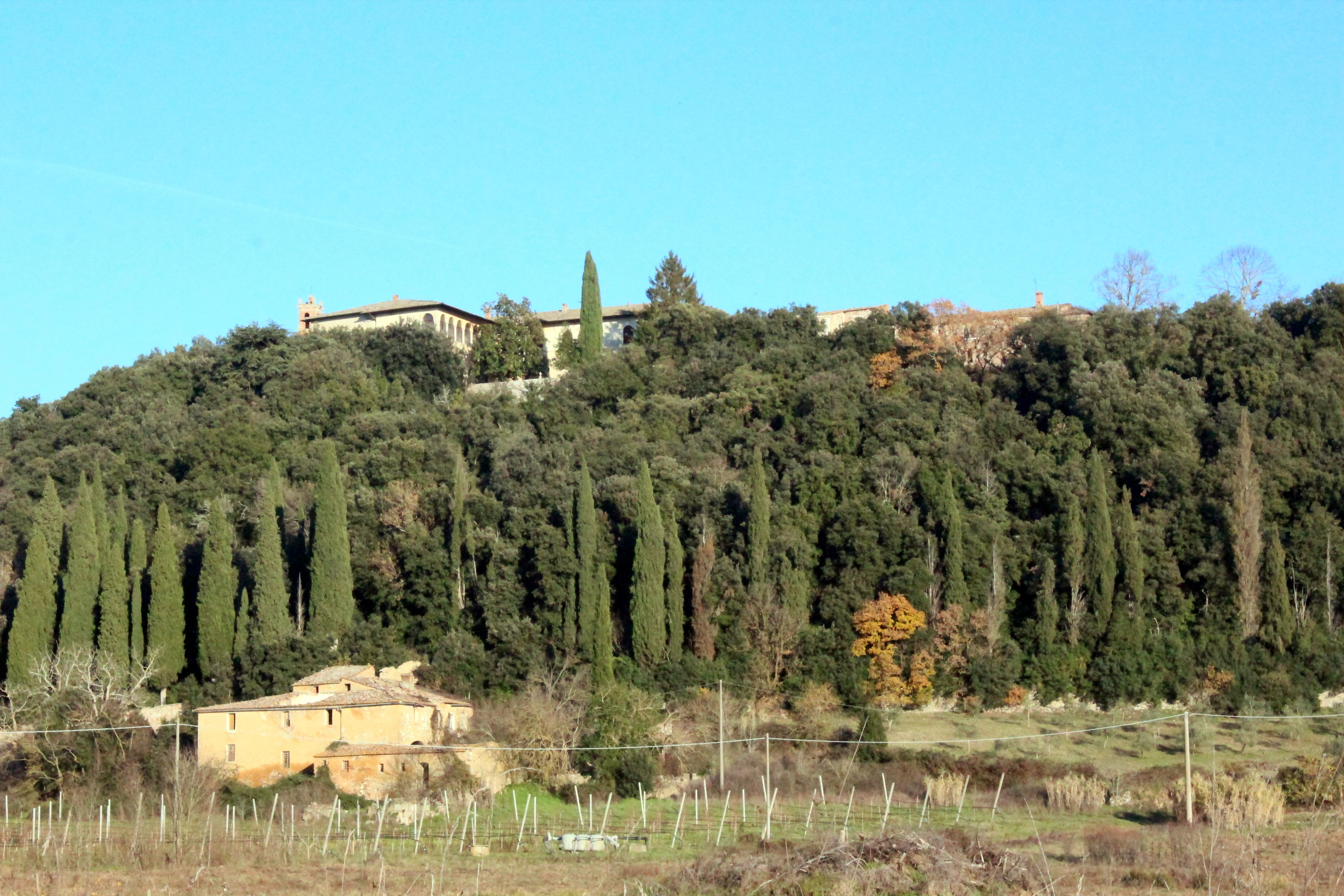
- View of Poggio Santa Cecilia

- Location of Poggio Santa Cecilia in Italy
- Coordinates: 43°17′35″N 11°38′10″E
- Country: Italy
- Region: Tuscany
- Province: Siena (SI)
- Comune: Rapolano Terme
- Elevation: 394 m (1,293 ft)
- Demonym: Poggesi
- Time zone: UTC+1 (CET)
  - Summer (DST): UTC+2 (CEST)

Poggio Santa Cecilia is a village in Tuscany, central Italy, administratively a frazione of the comune of Rapolano Terme, province of Siena.

Poggio Santa Cecilia is about 30 km from Siena and 4 km from Rapolano Terme.

== Bibliography ==
- Guide d'Italia. Toscana. Milan: Touring Club Italiano. 2012. p. 661.
