= David Bussagli =

Italian politician (born 1982)

President of the Province of Siena
- In office 23 October 2022 – 30 September 2024
- Preceded by: Silvio Franceschelli
- Succeeded by: Agnese Carletti

Mayor of Poggibonsi
- In office 27 May 2014 – 24 June 2024
- Preceded by: Lucia Coccheri
- Succeeded by: Susanna Cenni

Personal details
- Born: 7 August 1982 (age 44) Castelfiorentino, Tuscany, Italy
- Party: Democratic Party
- Education: University of Siena
- Occupation: Bank employee

David Bussagli (born 7 August 1982) is an Italian politician who served as president of the Province of Siena from 2022 to 2024. A member of the Democratic Party, he also served as mayor of Poggibonsi from 2014 to 2024.

== Life and career ==
Bussagli graduated from the University of Siena with a degree in economics in 2004. He joined Banca Monte dei Paschi di Siena in 2005, working in banking and credit services.

He entered politics in 2004, when he was elected to the municipal council of Poggibonsi. In the 2014 Italian local elections, he was elected mayor with 10,076 votes (64.39%) representing a centre-left coalition formed by the Democratic Party and Left Ecology Freedom.

In 2019, he was elected to the Provincial Council of Siena and became its vice president in January 2022. Following the resignation of president Silvio Franceschelli in July 2022, Bussagli served as acting president until the provincial election held on 29 September. Supported by the centre-left coalition, he was elected president of the Province of Siena with 73% of the weighted vote, defeating Alessio Serragli, the mayor of Monticiano.
