= Modanella =

- Frazione
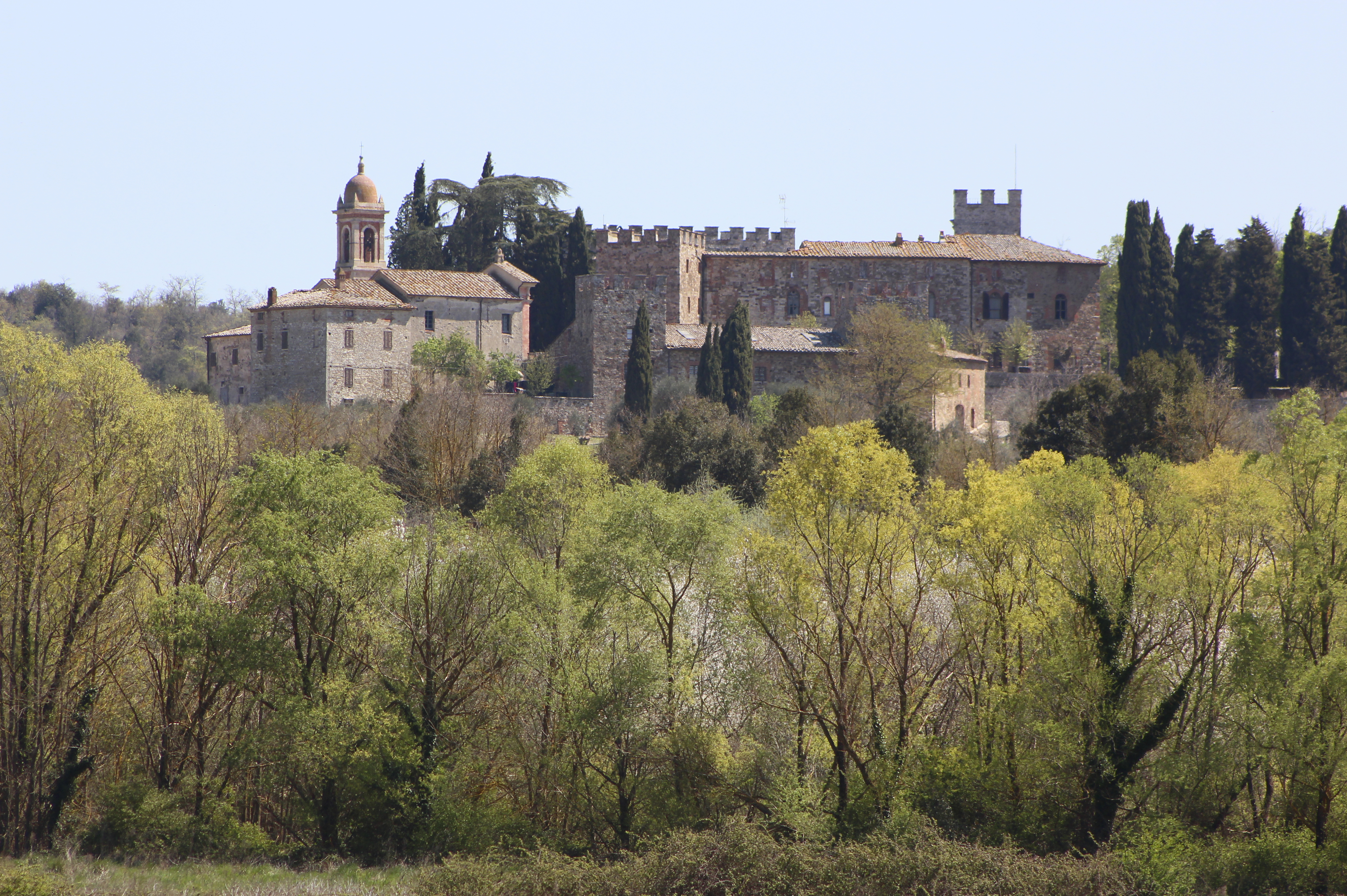
- View of Modanella

- Location of Modanella in Italy
- Coordinates: 43°16′28″N 11°40′3″E
- Country: Italy
- Region: Tuscany
- Province: Siena (SI)
- Comune: Rapolano Terme
- Elevation: 360 m (1,180 ft)
- Time zone: UTC+1 (CET)
  - Summer (DST): UTC+2 (CEST)

Modanella is a village in Tuscany, central Italy, administratively a frazione of the comune of Rapolano Terme, province of Siena.

Modanella is about 33 km from Siena and 7 km from Rapolano Terme.

== Bibliography ==
- Guide d'Italia. Toscana. Milan: Touring Club Italiano. 2012. p. 661.
- Emanuele Repetti (1839). "Modanella". Dizionario geografico fisico storico della Toscana. Vol. 3. Florence. p. 224.
