= Fabio Ceccherini =

Italian politician (born 1958)

President of the Province of Siena
- In office 14 June 2004 – 8 June 2009
- Preceded by: Alessandro Starnini
- Succeeded by: Simone Bezzini

Mayor of Poggibonsi
- In office 31 May 1990 – 14 June 1999
- Preceded by: Marcello Gentilini
- Succeeded by: Luca Rugi

Personal details
- Born: 12 September 1958 (age 68) San Gimignano, Province of Siena, Italy
- Party: Italian Communist Party; Democratic Party of the Left; Democrats of the Left; Democratic Party

Fabio Ceccherini (born 12 September 1958) is an Italian politician who served as president of the Province of Siena from 2004 to 2009. He also served as mayor of Poggibonsi from 1990 to 1999.

== Life and career ==
Ceccherini was born in San Gimignano, in the province of Siena, in 1958. He worked as an executive of the National Confederation of Craftsmanship and Small and Medium Enterprises (CNA).

A member of the Communist Party, Ceccherini subsequently joined the Democratic Party of the Left and the Democrats of the Left (DS). He was elected mayor of Poggibonsi in 1990 and re-elected in 1995.

In the 1999 provincial elections, Ceccherini was elected president of the Province of Siena with 64.2% of the vote, supported by a centre-left coalition comprising the DS, Italian People's Party, Greens, Party of Italian Communists, and the Democrats. He was re-elected in 2004, receiving 62.5% of the vote as the candidate of a coalition including the DS, The Daisy, Reformists, the Greens and the Italian Communists. He later joined the Democratic Party.
