= Alessandro Starnini =

Italian politician (born 1956)

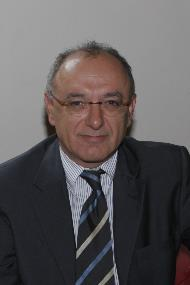

Mayor of Rapolano Terme
- Incumbent
- Assumed office 27 May 2019

President of the Province of Siena
- In office 18 July 1990 – 14 June 1999
- Preceded by: Giordano Chechi
- Succeeded by: Fabio Ceccherini

Member of the Regional Council of Tuscany
- In office 9 May 2000 – 30 March 2010

Personal details
- Born: 11 June 1956 (age 69) Rapolano Terme, Province of Siena, Italy
- Party: Democratic Party

Alessandro Starnini (born 11 June 1956) is an Italian politician who has served as mayor of Rapolano Terme since 2019. He previously served as president of the Province of Siena (1990–1999) and member of the Regional Council of Tuscany (2000–2010).

Political offices
Preceded by Giordano Chechi	President of the Province of Siena; 1990–1999	Succeeded by Fabio Ceccherini
