= Simone Bezzini =

Italian politician (born 1969)

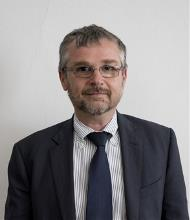

Member of the Regional Council of Tuscany
- Incumbent
- Assumed office 29 October 2025
- In office 17 June 2015 – 22 September 2020

Regional assessor of Healthcare of Tuscany
- In office 22 October 2020 – 10 November 2025
- President: Eugenio Giani

President of the Province of Siena
- In office 8 June 2009 – 12 October 2014
- Preceded by: Fabio Ceccherini
- Succeeded by: Fabrizio Nepi

Member of the Provincial Council of Siena
- In office 19 June 2004 – 8 June 2009

Personal details
- Born: 27 November 1969 (age 56) Colle di Val d'Elsa, Province of Siena, Italy
- Party: Democratic Party

Simone Bezzini (born 27 November 1969) is an Italian politician who has served as a member of the Regional Council of Tuscany since October 2025.

He also previously served as president of the Province of Siena (2009–2014) and regional assessor of healthcare in the first Giani government (2020–2025).

Political offices
Preceded by Fabio Ceccherini	President of the Province of Siena; 2009–2014	Succeeded by Fabrizio Nepi
