= Serre di Rapolano =

- Frazione
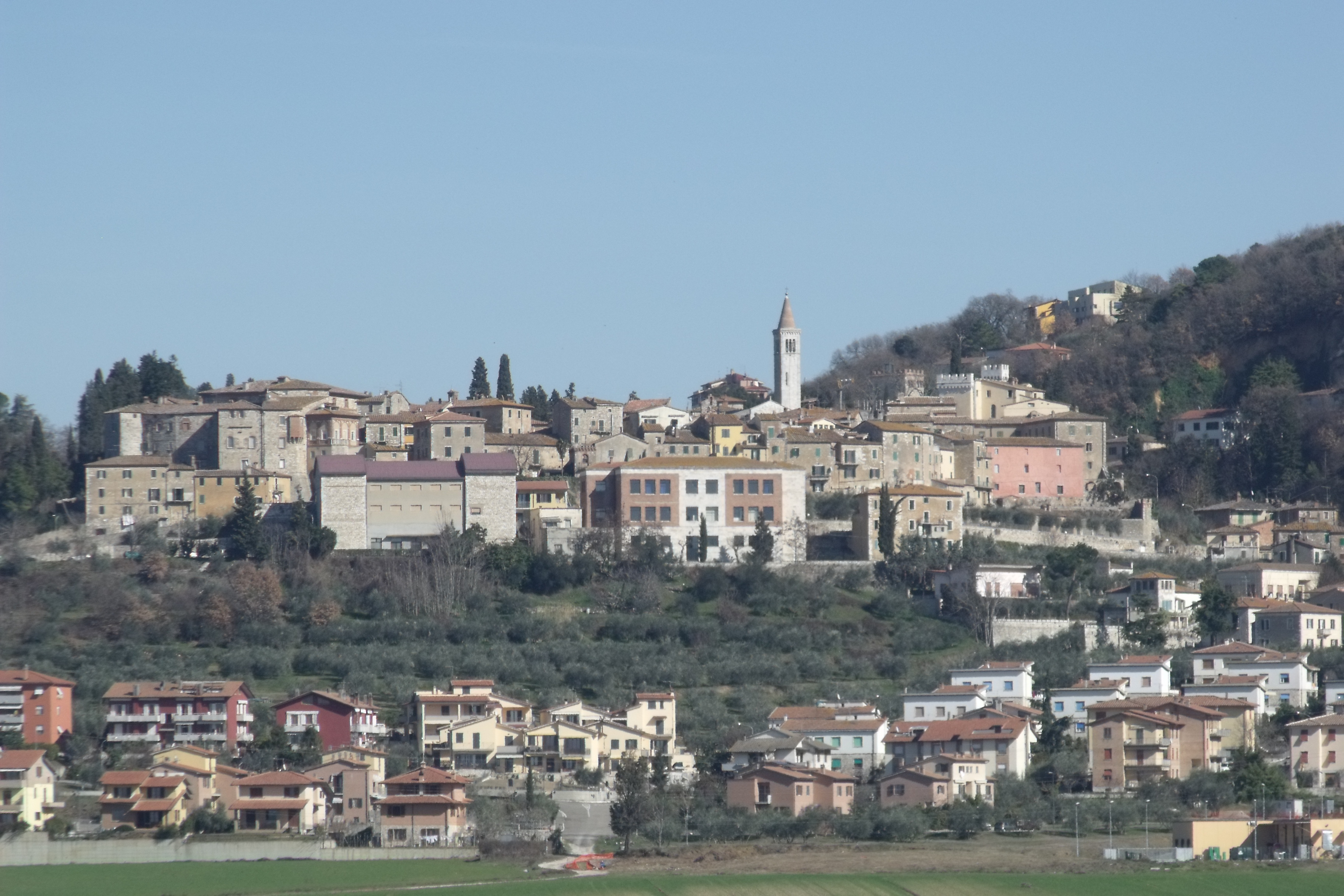

- Location of Serre di Rapolano in Italy
- Coordinates: 43°15′28″N 11°37′01″E
- Country: Italy
- Region: Tuscany
- Province: Siena (SI)
- Comune: Rapolano Terme

Area
  - Total: 83.04 km^{2} (32.06 sq mi)
- Elevation: 350 m (1,150 ft)

Population (2001)
  - Total: 1,958
  - Density: 23.58/km^{2} (61.07/sq mi)
- Demonym: Serrigiani
- Time zone: UTC+1 (CET)
  - Summer (DST): UTC+2 (CEST)
- Postal code: 53040
- Dialing code: 0577
- Website: Official website

Serre di Rapolano is a frazione in the comune of Rapolano Terme in the province of Siena, Tuscany, Italy.

It is located on a hill midway between the valleys of the Sentino and Ombrone rivers. Among the prominent buildings are:

- Palazzo Gori Martini, a 19th-century neo-Gothic white marble palace
- Chiesa della Compagnia di Santa Caterina della Misericordia, a small oratory with frescoes by Sebastiano Follia and canvases by Astolfo Petrazzi
- Castello di Modanella
- Pieve di Sant'Andreino alle Cave
- Pieve dei Santi Andrea e Lorenzo
