= San Gimignanello =

- Frazione
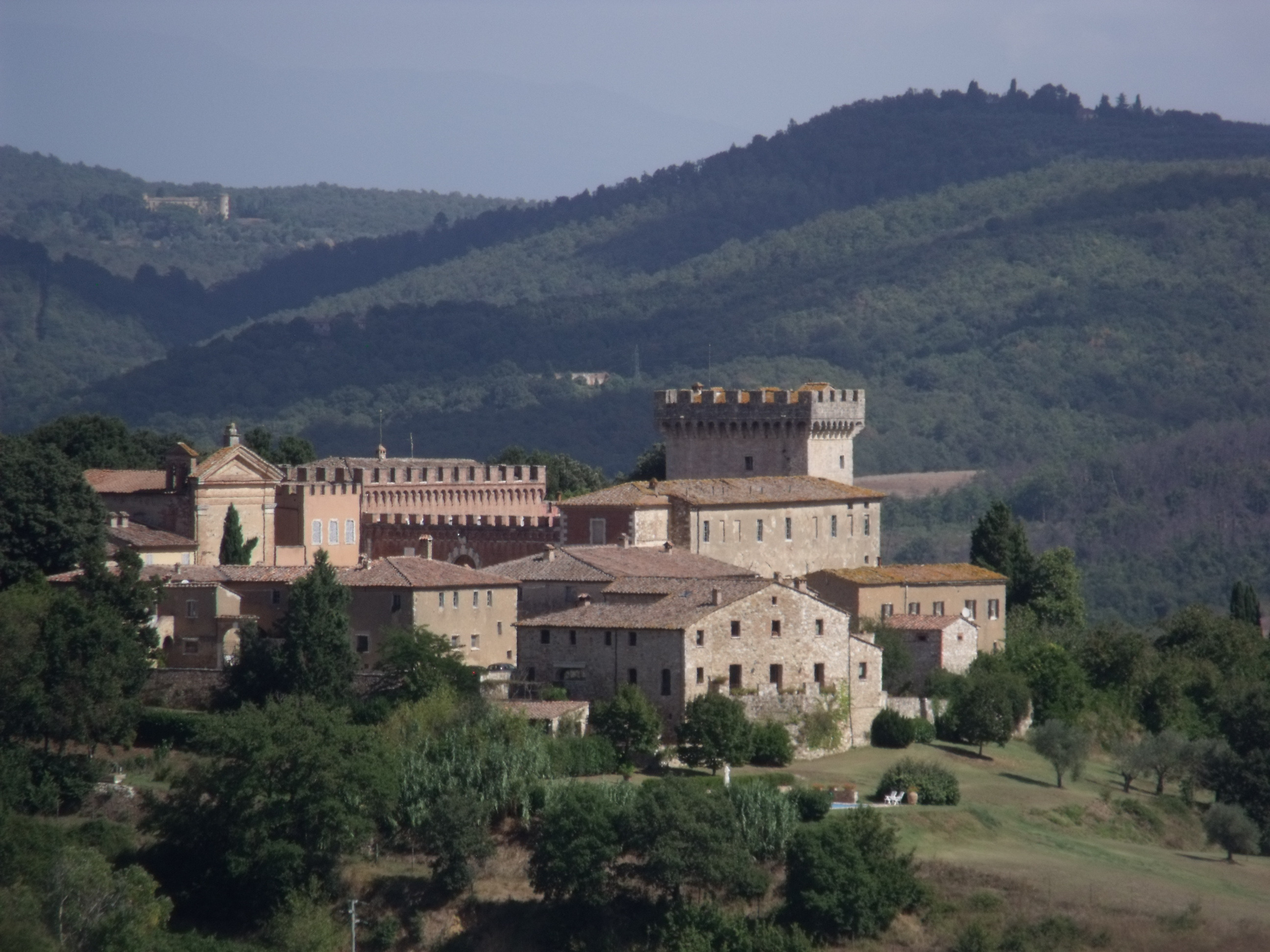
- View of San Gimignanello

- Location of San Gimignanello in Italy
- Coordinates: 43°14′18″N 11°38′14″E
- Country: Italy
- Region: Tuscany
- Province: Siena (SI)
- Comune: Rapolano Terme
- Elevation: 337 m (1,106 ft)
- Time zone: UTC+1 (CET)
  - Summer (DST): UTC+2 (CEST)

San Gimignanello is a village in Tuscany, central Italy, administratively a frazione of the comune of Rapolano Terme, province of Siena.

San Gimignanello is about 34 km from Siena and 8 km from Rapolano Terme.

== Bibliography ==
- Emanuele Repetti (1839). "San Gimignanello". Dizionario geografico fisico storico della Toscana. Vol. 2, 5. Florence. pp. 444–445, 34–35.
