= Susanna Cenni =

Italian politician

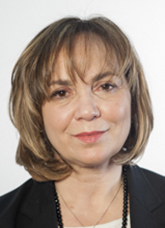

Mayor of Poggibonsi
- Incumbent
- Assumed office 27 June 2024
- Preceded by: David Bussagli

Member of the Chamber of Deputies
- In office 29 April 2008 – 13 October 2022
- Constituency: Tuscany (2008, 2013); Poggibonsi (2018)

Personal details
- Born: 17 April 1963 (age 63) Monteroni d'Arbia, Italy
- Party: Democratic Party (since 2007)
- Other political affiliations: PCI (till 1991); PDS (1991-1998); DS (1998-2007)
- Profession: Public employee

Susanna Cenni (born 17 April 1963) is an Italian politician of the Democratic Party.

== Biography ==
Cenni began her political career when she was very young, joining the Italian Communist Party, which later became Democratic Party of the Left and then Democrats of the Left. In 2007, Cenni was elected in the National Constituent of the Democratic Party.

From 2000 to 2005, Cenni has been the regional councilor for Tourism, Trade and Fairs in Tuscany, while from 2005 to 2008, she has been the regional councilor for Agriculture, both times under Claudio Martini's presidency.

Cenni is elected for the first time to the Chamber of Deputies after the 2008 general elections, and has been later re-elected in the 2013 elections and the 2018 elections. Cenni is currently vice-president of the Agriculture Committee of the Chamber of Deputies.

In occasion of the 2017 Democratic Party primaries, she gave her support to Minister of Justice Andrea Orlando, while during the 2023 primaries she gave her support to Elly Schlein.
