= Silvio Franceschelli =

Italian politician (born 1970)

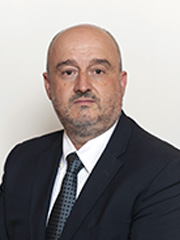

Member of the Senate of the Republic
- Incumbent
- Assumed office 13 October 2022
- Constituency: Tuscany

Mayor of Montalcino
- Incumbent
- Assumed office 7 May 2012
- Preceded by: Maurizio Buffi

President of the Province of Siena
- In office 31 October 2018 – 28 July 2022
- Preceded by: Fabrizio Nepi
- Succeeded by: David Bussagli

Personal details
- Born: 16 August 1970 (age 56) Pistoia, Tuscany, Italy
- Party: Democratic Party
- Education: University of Siena
- Profession: Lawyer

Silvio Franceschelli (born 16 August 1970) is an Italian politician who has served as Senator since October 2022.

He also served as president of the Province of Siena (2018–2022) and mayor of Montalcino.

Political offices
Preceded by Fabrizio Nepi	President of the Province of Siena; 2018–2022	Succeeded by David Bussagli
