= Bruno Bernabei =

Italian politician (1888–1947)

Bruno Bernabei (30 May 1888 – 23 December 1947) was an Italian politician.

Bernabei was born in Rapolano Terme. He represented the Italian Republican Party in the Constituent Assembly of Italy in 1947.

== Biography ==
After graduating with a law degree, he worked as a lawyer. He was a member of the Freemasonry in Italy, having been initiated on 12 May 1919, into the Diciannove Maggio lodge in Velletri.

A member of the Italian Republican Party, he was a candidate in the elections for the Constituent Assembly on 2 June 1946, in the Rome-Viterbo-Latina-Frosinone constituency. He was the first of the unelected candidates on the PRI list, but after the death of Girolamo Grisolia, he was proclaimed a deputy on 6 February 1947.

He died on 23 December of the same year in Velletri, struck down by illness while attending a ceremony to award a gold medal to a construction company worker. He was replaced in the Constituent Assembly by his party colleague Leone Azzali.

== Bibliography ==
- Legislature Precedenti via Italian Parliament
