= Local Police ranks of Lombardy =

The Local Police ranks of the Polizia Locale in the Lombardy region of Italy define the hierarchy within the local police force and their corresponding insignia, as displayed on various uniform types. These insignia appear on shoulder straps, tubular slides, chest patches, and cap bands, depending on the personnel category. The regulations governing these insignia apply only to Lombardy, as ranks and insignia may differ in other regions of Italy.

== Commanders ==
Rank	Shoulder Strap Insignia	Tubular Slide Insignia	Chest Patch Insignia	Cap Band
Dirigenti (Executives)
Dirigente Generale (Chief Commander)				
Dirigente (Commander)				
Area dei funzionari e delle elevate qualificazioni (Officials and Highly Qualified Personnel Area)
Commissario Capo Coordinatore (Chief Commissioner Supervisor)				
Commissario Capo (Chief Commissioner)				

=== Deputy Commanders ===
Rank	Shoulder Strap Insignia	Tubular Slide Insignia	Chest Patch Insignia	Cap Band
Dirigenti (Executives)
Dirigente (Commander)				
Area dei funzionari e delle elevate qualificazioni (Officials and Highly Qualified Personnel Area)
Commissario Capo Coordinatore (Chief Commissioner Supervisor)				
Commissario Capo (Chief Commissioner)				
Commissario (Commissioner)				
Vice Commissario (Deputy Commissioner)				

=== Highly Qualified Officials ===
Rank	Shoulder Strap Insignia	Tubular Slide Insignia	Chest Patch Insignia	Cap Band
Area dei funzionari e delle elevate qualificazioni (Officials and Highly Qualified Personnel Area)
Commissario Capo Coordinatore (Chief Commissioner Supervisor)				
Commissario Capo (Chief Commissioner)				
Commissario (Commissioner)				
Vice Commissario (Deputy Commissioner)				

=== Standard Ranks ===
Rank	Shoulder Strap Insignia	Tubular Slide Insignia	Chest Patch Insignia	Cap Band
Dirigenti (Executives)
Dirigente (Commander)				
Area dei funzionari e delle elevate qualificazioni (Officials and Highly Qualified Personnel Area)
Commissario Capo Coordinatore (Chief Commissioner Supervisor)				
Commissario Capo (Chief Commissioner)				
Commissario (Commissioner)				
Vice Commissario (Deputy Commissioner)				
Area degli istruttori (Instructors Area)
Specialista di Vigilanza (Enforcement Specialist)				
Sovrintendente Esperto (Master Sergeant)				
Sovrintendente Scelto (Senior Sergeant)				
Sovrintendente (Sergeant)				
Assistente Esperto (Master Officer)				
Assistente Scelto (Lead Senior Officer)				
Assistente (Senior Officer)				
Agente Scelto (Officer)				
Agente (Junior Officer)				

=== Specific Responsibilities ===
Personnel holding ranks from Senior Officer to Chief Commissioner Supervisor, when holding specific responsibilities as defined by current contractual regulations, wear their rank insignia with green trim.

== Dress Uniform Ranks ==
For the dress uniforms (divise di gala) of the Officers of the Polizia Locale of the Lombardy Region, there is a system of ranks to be applied on the lower forearms. The background color of the rank in this case is white, in line with the color of the dress uniform, and the seven-pointed star present in the rank is trimmed in red for commanders, blue for deputy commanders, and green for holders of organizational positions.

=== Officers ===
Forearms
Rank
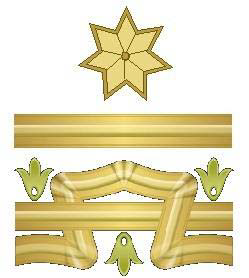
Dirigente Generale

of Local Police

Forearms
Rank
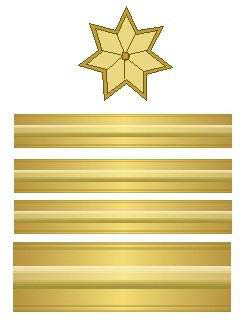
Dirigente

of Local Police

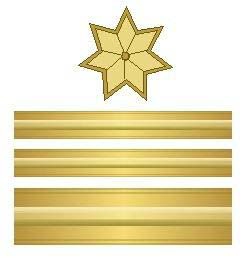
Commissario Capo Coordinatore

of Local Police

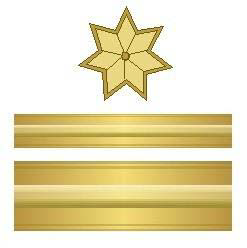
Commissario Capo

of Local Police

Forearms
Rank
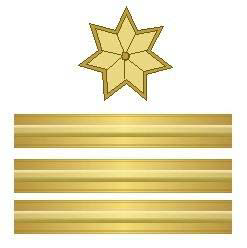
Commissario

of Local Police

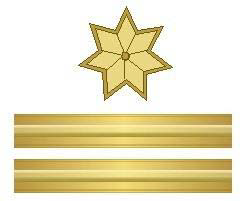
Vice Commissario

of Local Police

==== Special Trims ====
Forearms
Rank
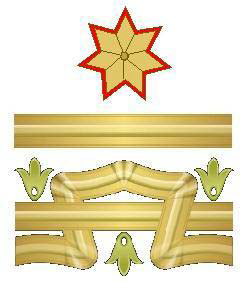
Dirigente Generale

Commander of Local Police
(red trim)

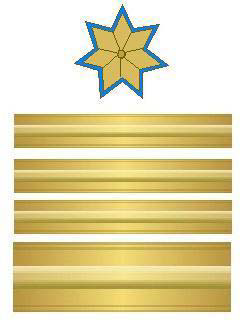
Dirigente

Deputy Commander of Local Police
(blue trim)

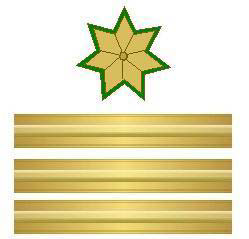
Commissario

holder of Organizational Position of Local Police
(green trim)

=== Service Managers ===
Insignia
Nomenclature
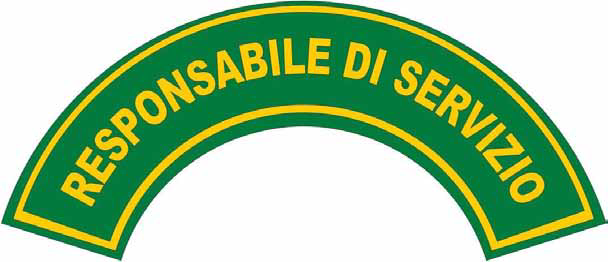
Responsabile di servizio

di Polizia Locale

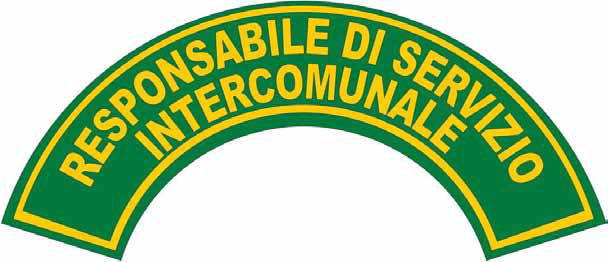
Responsabile di servizio intercomunale

di Polizia Locale

The first image represents the insignia for a Service Manager of Local Police. The second image represents the insignia for an Intermunicipal Service Manager of Local Police.

== Commanders of Local Police Corps ==
- Commissario capo (Chief Commissioner): staffing of at least 25 employees
- Commissario capo coordinatore (Chief Commissioner Supervisor): staffing from 31 to 70 employees
- Dirigente (Director): with a Local Police Corps staff of more than 70 units or executive officers in command positions of the Local Police Corps of the provincial capital municipalities and provinces.
- Dirigente generale (Director General): Commander of the regional capital (Milan)

== Rank Advancement Table ==
From	To	Time Elapsed
Officers and Sergeants
Agente (Junior Officer)	Agente scelto (Officer)	5 years
Agente scelto (Officer)	Assistente (Senior Officer)	5 years (10 years seniority)
Assistente (Senior Officer)	Assistente scelto (Lead Senior Officer)	5 years (15 years seniority)
Assistente scelto (Lead Senior Officer)	Assistente esperto (Master Officer)	5 years (20 years seniority)
Assistante esperto (Master Officer)	Sovrintendente (Sergeant)	5 years (25 years seniority)
Sovrintendente (Sergeant)	Sovrintendente scelto (Senior Sergeant)	5 years (30 years seniority)
Sovrintendente scelto (Senior Sergeant)	Sovrintendente esperto (Master Sergeant)	5 years (35 years seniority)
Chiefs
Vice commissario (Deputy Commissioner)	Commissario (Commissioner)	7 years
Commissario (Commissioner)	Commissario capo (Chief Commissioner)	7 years (14 years of seniority)
Commissario capo (Chief Commissioner)	Commissario capo coordinatore (Chief Commissioner Supervisor)	Competitive examination or internal regulation
Senior Chiefs
Dirigente (Director)		Competitive examination or internal regulation
Dirigente Generale (Director General) (Regional Capital City)		Competitive examination

== See also ==
- Municipal police (Italy)
- Polizia provinciale
- Law enforcement in Italy
