= Rapolano Terme =

- Comune
- Comune di Rapolano Terme
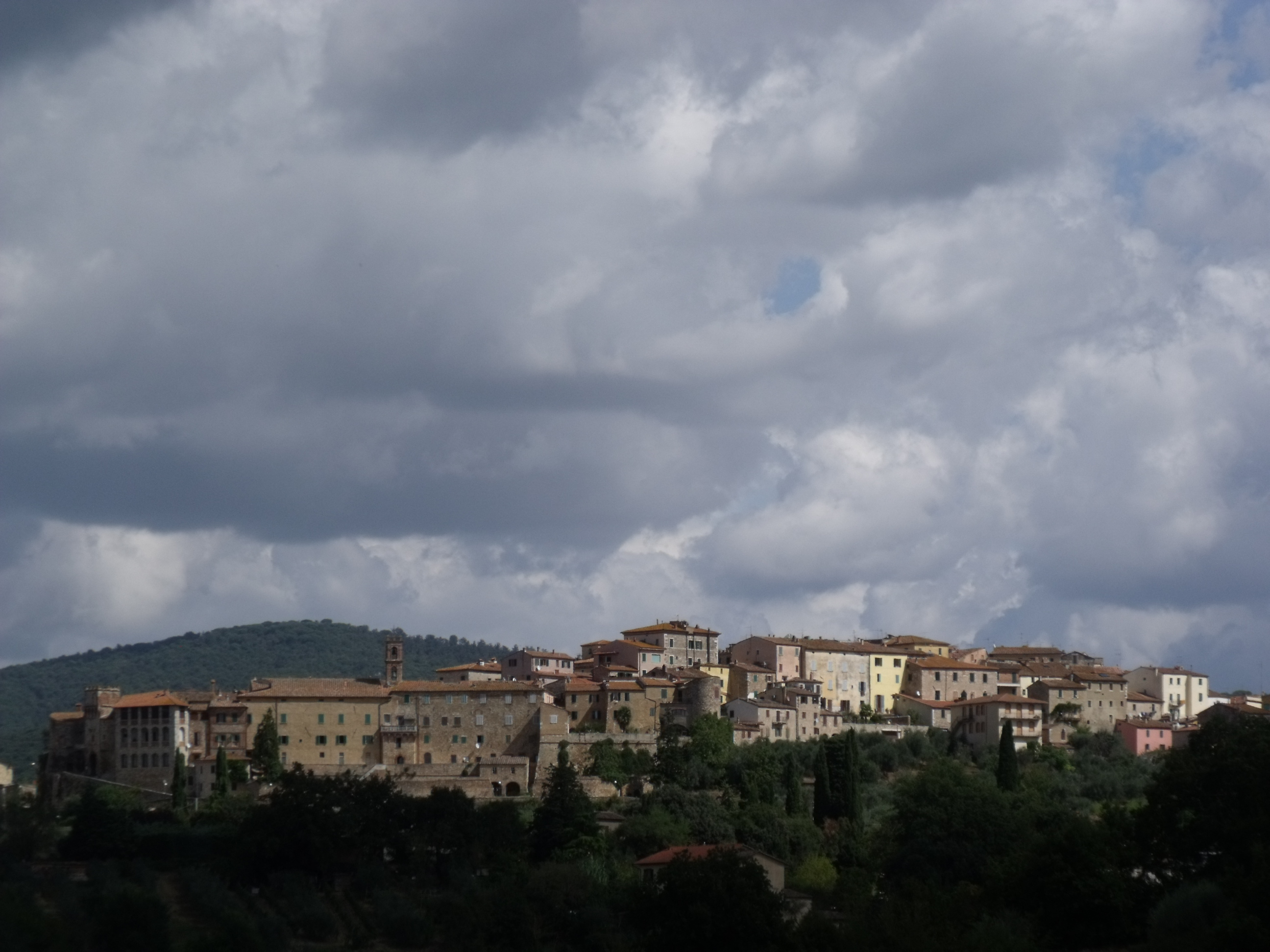

- Flag Coat of arms

- Location within Italy Location within Tuscany
- Coordinates: 43°17′N 11°36′E
- Country: Italy
- Region: Tuscany
- Province: Siena (SI)
- Frazioni: Armaiolo, Modanella, Poggio Santa Cecilia, San Gimignanello, Serre di Rapolano

Government
  - Mayor: Alessandro Starnini (centre-left)

Area
  - Total: 83.04 km^{2} (32.06 sq mi)
- Elevation: 334 m (1,096 ft)

Population (31 December 2010)
  - Total: 5,308
  - Density: 63.92/km^{2} (165.6/sq mi)
- Demonym: Rapolanesi
- Time zone: UTC+1 (CET)
  - Summer (DST): UTC+2 (CEST)
- Postal code: 53040
- Dialing code: 0577
- Website: Official website

Rapolano Terme is a comune (municipality) in the Province of Siena in the Italian region Tuscany, located about 60 kilometres (37 mi) southeast of Florence and about 20 kilometres (12 mi) east of Siena in the area known as the Crete Senesi.

Until 1949 it was known simply as Rapolano.

The municipality includes several minor towns, among which the village of Serre di Rapolano.

== Notable people ==
- Bruno Bernabei (1888-1947) who represented the Italian Republican Party in the Constituent Assembly of Italy in 1947.
