= Luciano Mencaraglia =

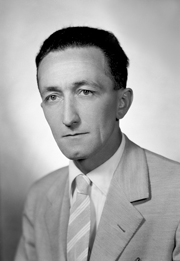

Member of the Senate of the Republic
- In office 1958–1968
- Constituency: Siena

Mayor of Siena
- In office 26 July 1969 – 1 December 1969
- Preceded by: Canzio Vannini
- Succeeded by: Roberto Barzanti

Personal details
- Born: 3 July 1915 Seravezza, Province of Lucca, Kingdom of Italy
- Died: 24 August 2002 (aged 87) Siena, Tuscany, Italy
- Party: Italian Communist Party (until 1991); Communist Refoundation Party (1991–1998); Party of Italian Communists (1998–2002)
- Profession: Teacher

Luciano Mencaraglia (3 July 1915 – 24 August 2002) was an Italian politician who served as a senator during the 3rd and 4th legislatures (1958–1968), as mayor of Siena and as president of the Province of Siena.
