= Municipal police (Italy) =

Italian municipal police

Municipal Police Polizia Locale
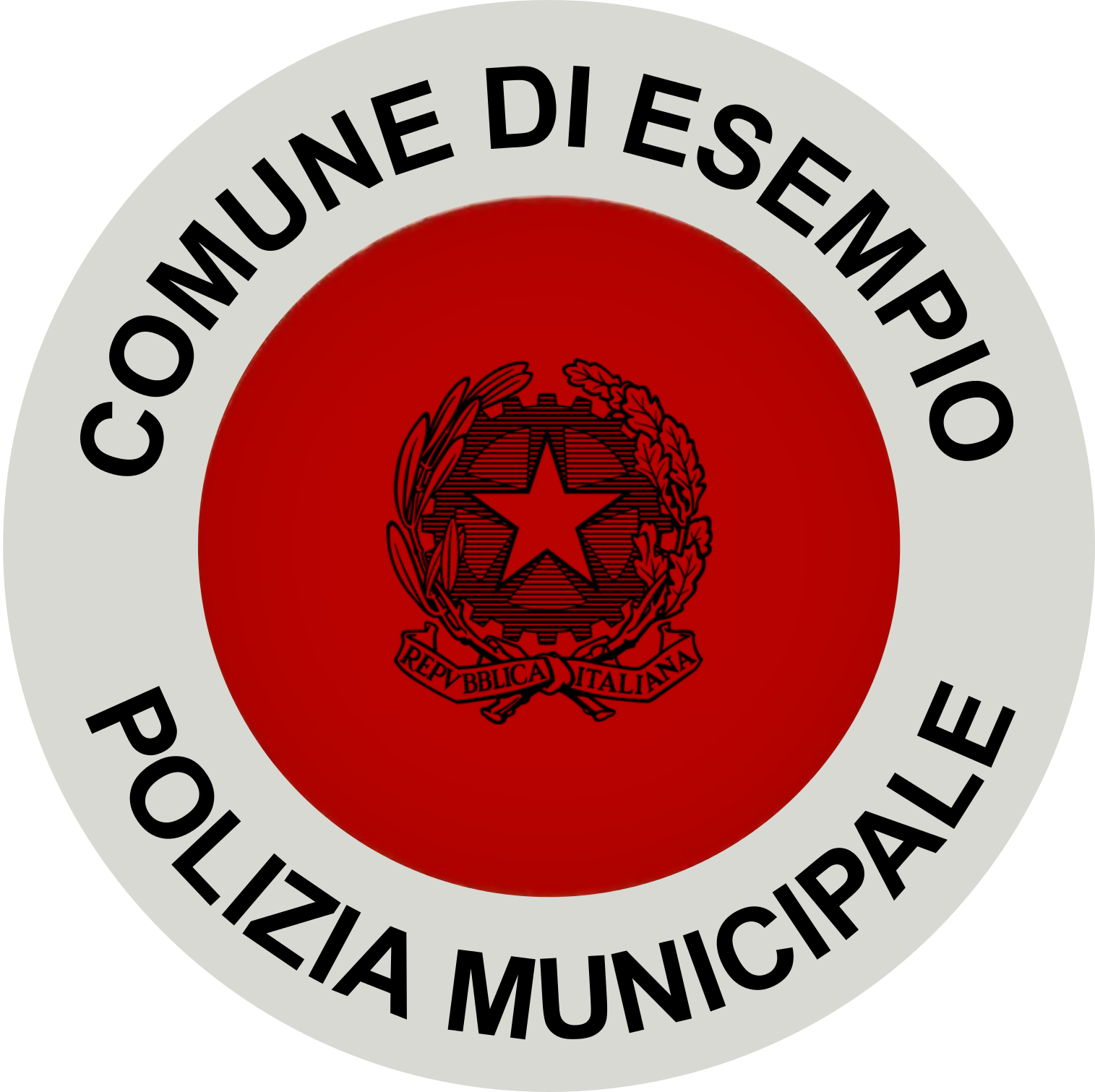
- Sign used to indicate a police checkpoint by the municipal police

- Traffic sign indicating a municipal police station
- Abbreviation: PL or PM

Agency overview
- Formed: 1986
- Preceding agency: Various local guard corps
- Employees: ~60,000
- Annual budget: Varies by municipality

Jurisdictional structure
- National agency: Italy
- Operations jurisdiction: Italy
- General nature: Local civilian police

Operational structure
- Overseen by: Municipality
- Elected officer responsible: Mayor
- Agency executive: Commander
- Parent agency: Municipal government

Notables
- Anniversary: Saint Sebastian

In Italy, Polizia Locale (lit. 'local police'), Polizia Municipale (lit. 'municipal police') and sometimes Vigili Urbani (lit. 'urban guards', an obsolete term still used colloquially) are the municipal police of the comuni (municipalities). Their duties are mainly administrative in nature, encompassing tasks such as traffic management, overseeing licenses, and enforcing urban regulations. Additionally, they support general law enforcement efforts and investigate traffic incidents, minor offenses, and petty crimes. There are roughly 60,000 municipal police officers in Italy. Since 2011, the Italian regions have been responsible for coordinating, organizing, and training municipal police.

== History ==
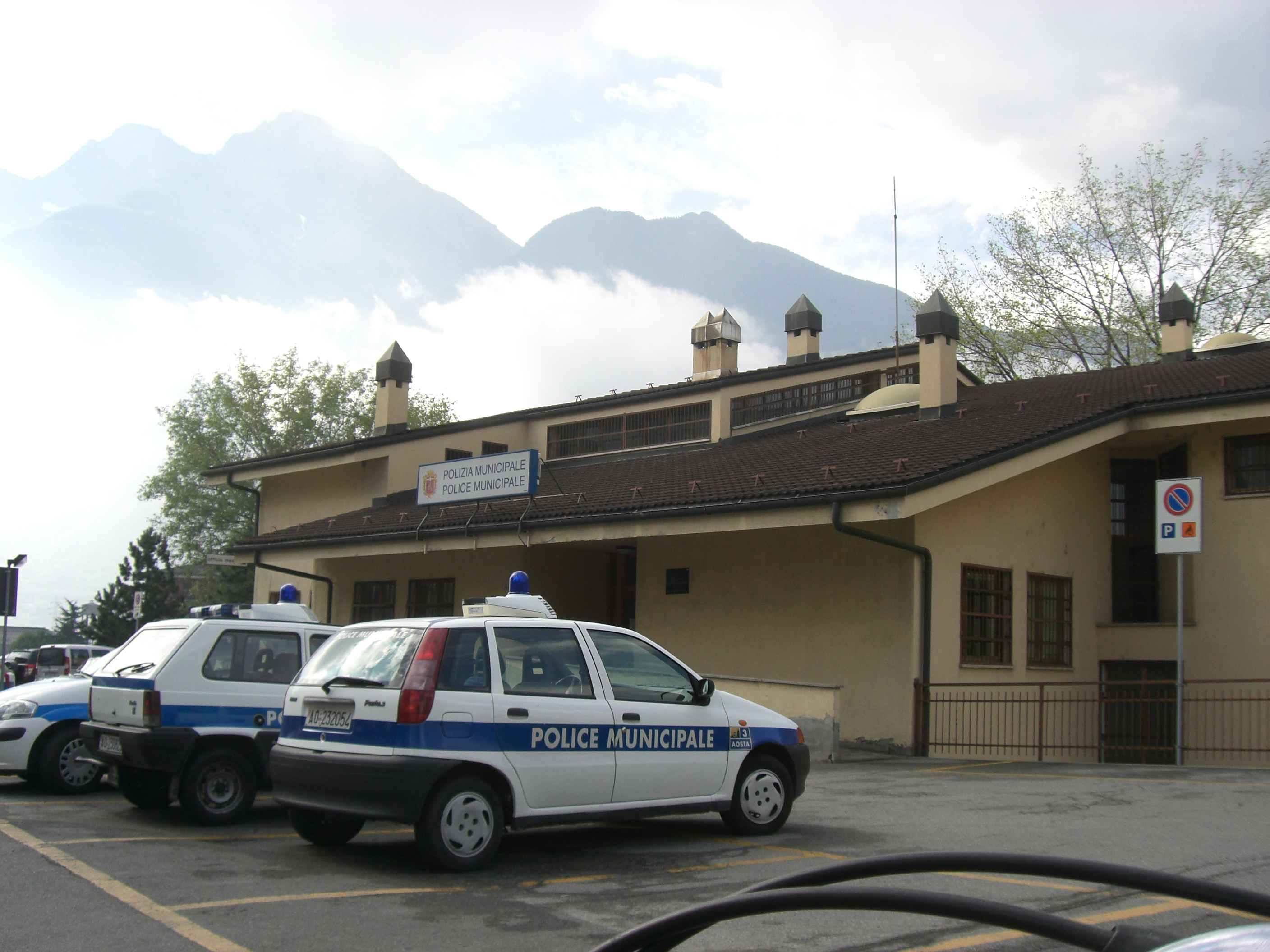
Municipal police headquarters with bilingual Italian-French signs, Mont Émilius st, Aosta.

Some municipal police forces in Italy trace their origins to the vigili urbani and comes stabili of ancient Rome. Organized urban policing emerged in the 13th–14th centuries in the Italian comunes. While police forces are often considered a modern innovation, these medieval forces had similarities to modern police forces.
Until the mid-1980s, local police in Italy had a limited role, mainly focused on traffic regulation. However, a national reform in 1986, followed by regional laws restructuring local police departments, significantly broadened their responsibilities and duties.

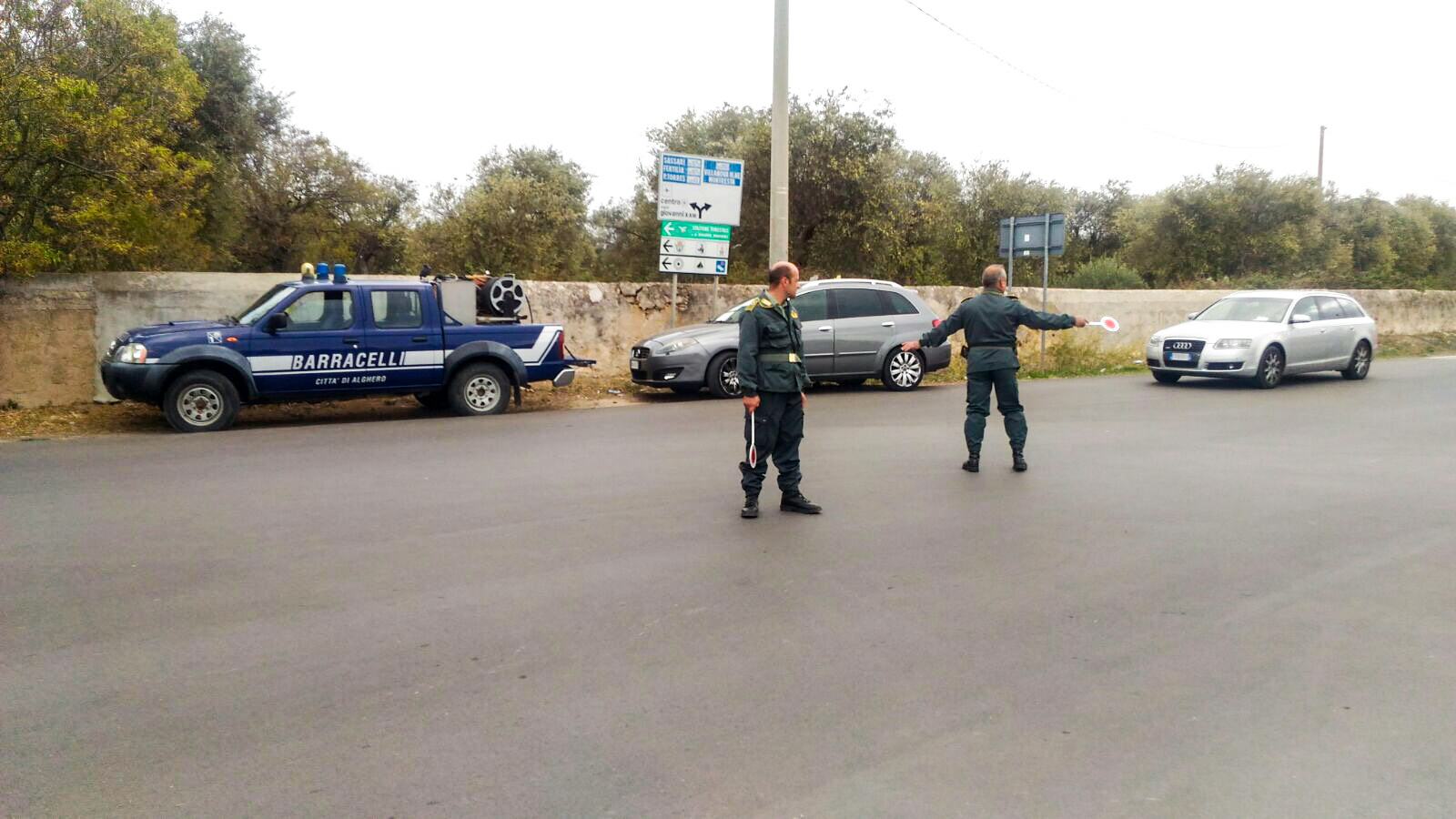
A pair of Compagnie Barracellari directing traffic in Alghero.

== Function ==
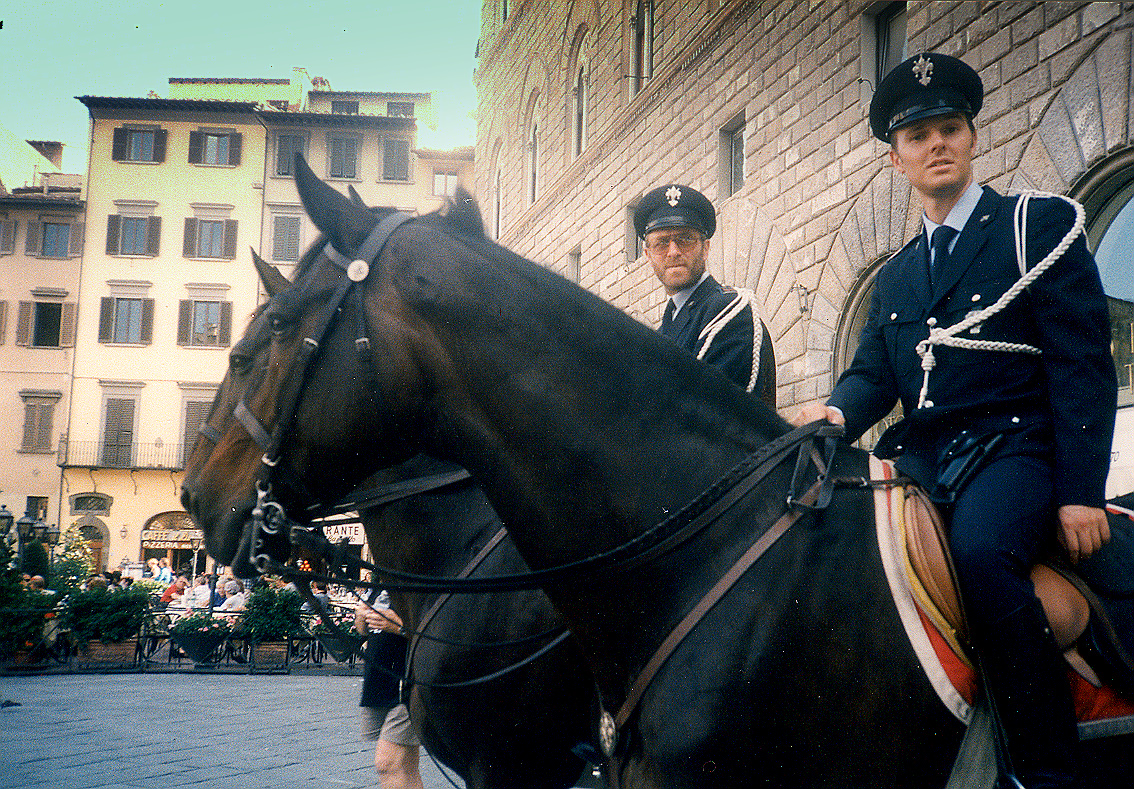
Mounted Polizia municipale in Piazza della Signoria in Florence.

The Polizia Locale and Polizia Municipale are law enforcement agencies operating under the authority of Italian local governments (comuni), and mostly act under the directives of the mayor's office. The jurisdiction of municipal police is generally restricted to a designated area that encompasses one or more cities and villages.
Their duties include enforcing national and local laws, investigating minor offenses, issuing local licenses and permits, and regulating traffic. They also cooperate with national police forces for local crime prevention and community policing. They can also be assigned judicial police functions, acting under the authority of the Prosecutor's Office. Additional tasks include environmental and wildlife protection, civil protection, and ceremonial duties.

== Organization and Rank Structure ==
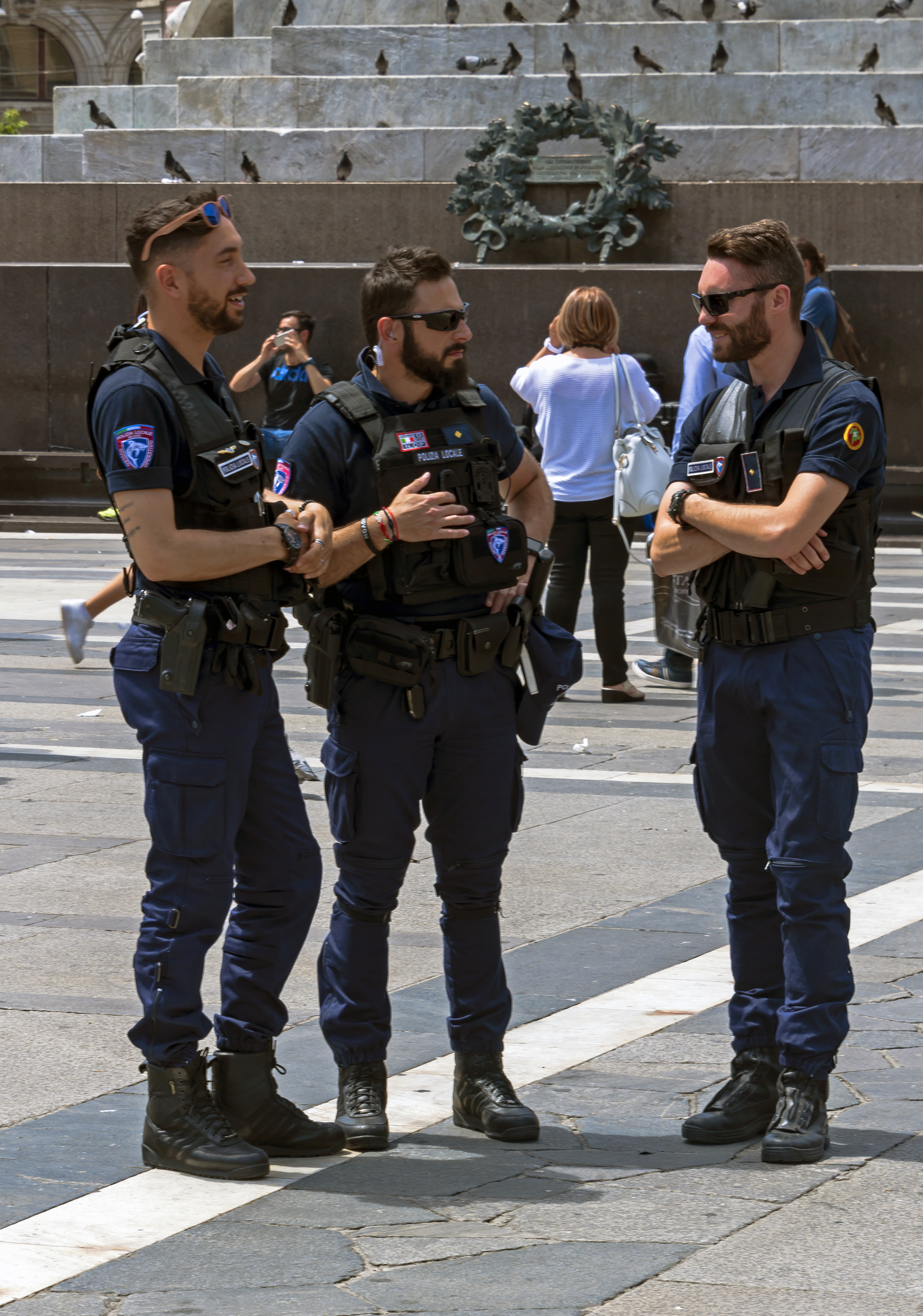
Three Italian polizia locale officers in Milan

Polizia Locale departments may range in size from a single officer in small villages to thousands of officers in major cities like Rome and Milan.
The organization of each department is determined by the city council, based on local regulations and needs. The rank structure varies by region and municipality. A common structure for a mid-sized department is:

- Comandante (Chief) - Usually a senior police officer with the rank of Police Captain or above
- Ufficiali di Polizia Locale - with ranks such as Commissario (Lieutenant)
- Sottufficiali di Polizia Locale - Non-commissioned officers, such as Ispettore (Inspector) or Sovrintendente (Supervisor), roughly equivalent to a Sergeant
- Operatori di Polizia Locale - Officers, with ranks such as Agente (Officer), Agente Scelto (First Class Officer) or Assistente (Senior Officer)

== Equipment ==
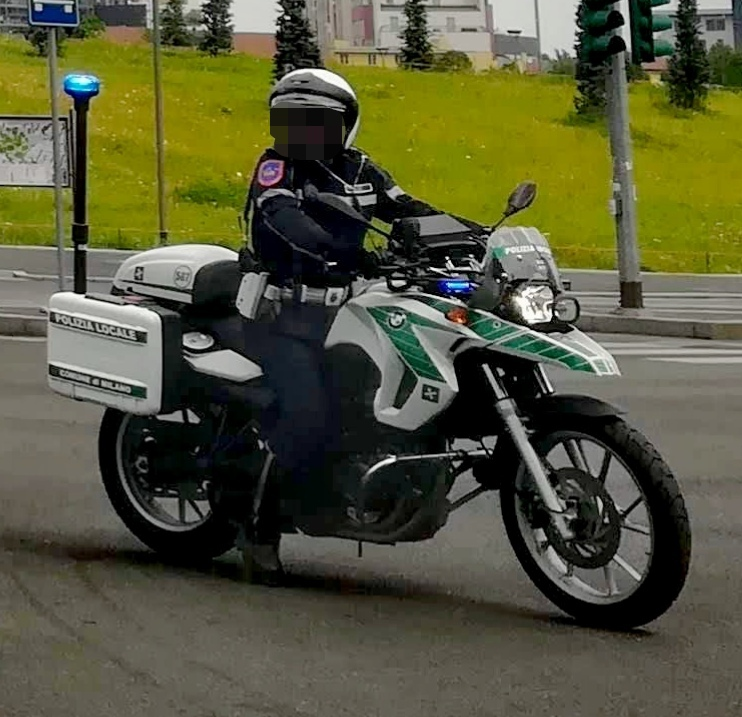
Polizia Locale of Milan motorbike.

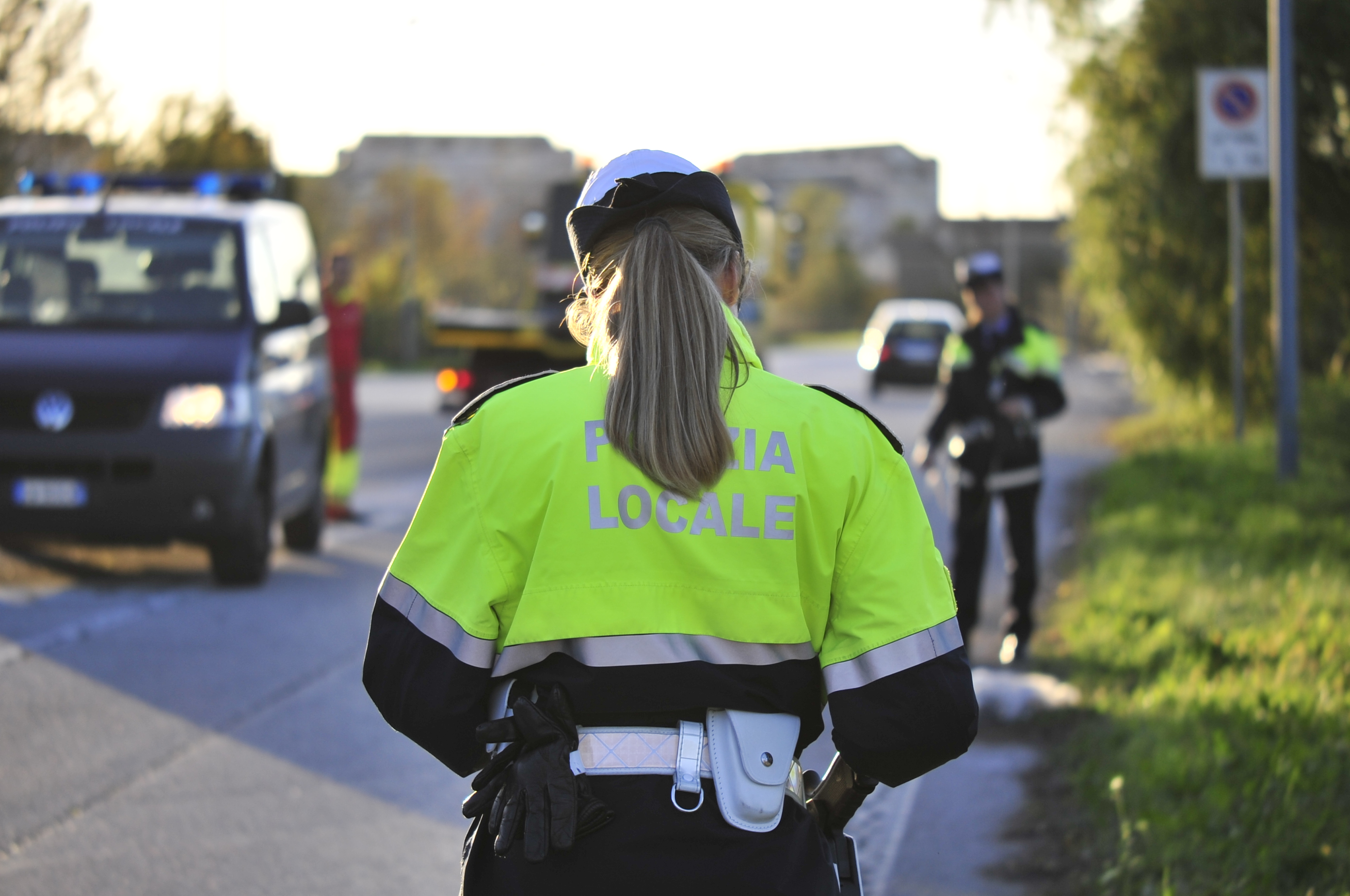
A Polizia Locale officer conducting a road accident survey.

The Polizia Locale, like other Italian law enforcement agencies, uses a range of equipment. This varies depending on the specific needs and resources of individual municipalities.

=== Vehicles ===
Polizia Locale vehicle fleets are diverse, reflecting varied operational environments. They commonly include:

- Automobiles: city cars and hatchbacks are used for urban patrols.
- Motorbikes: provide maneuverability in congested areas.
- Vans: generally equipped as mobile offices.
- Pick-up Trucks and Off-Road Vehicles: used for patrolling rural areas, rough terrain, or for transporting equipment.
- Boats: used for aquatic policing where applicable.

Vehicle liveries are predominantly white, often featuring stripes in green, blue, or red, along with the emblem or coat of arms of the relevant municipality or region. Vehicles are typically equipped with a blue flashing light bar, a spotlight, a two-tone siren, road cones and signals, and a two-way radio.

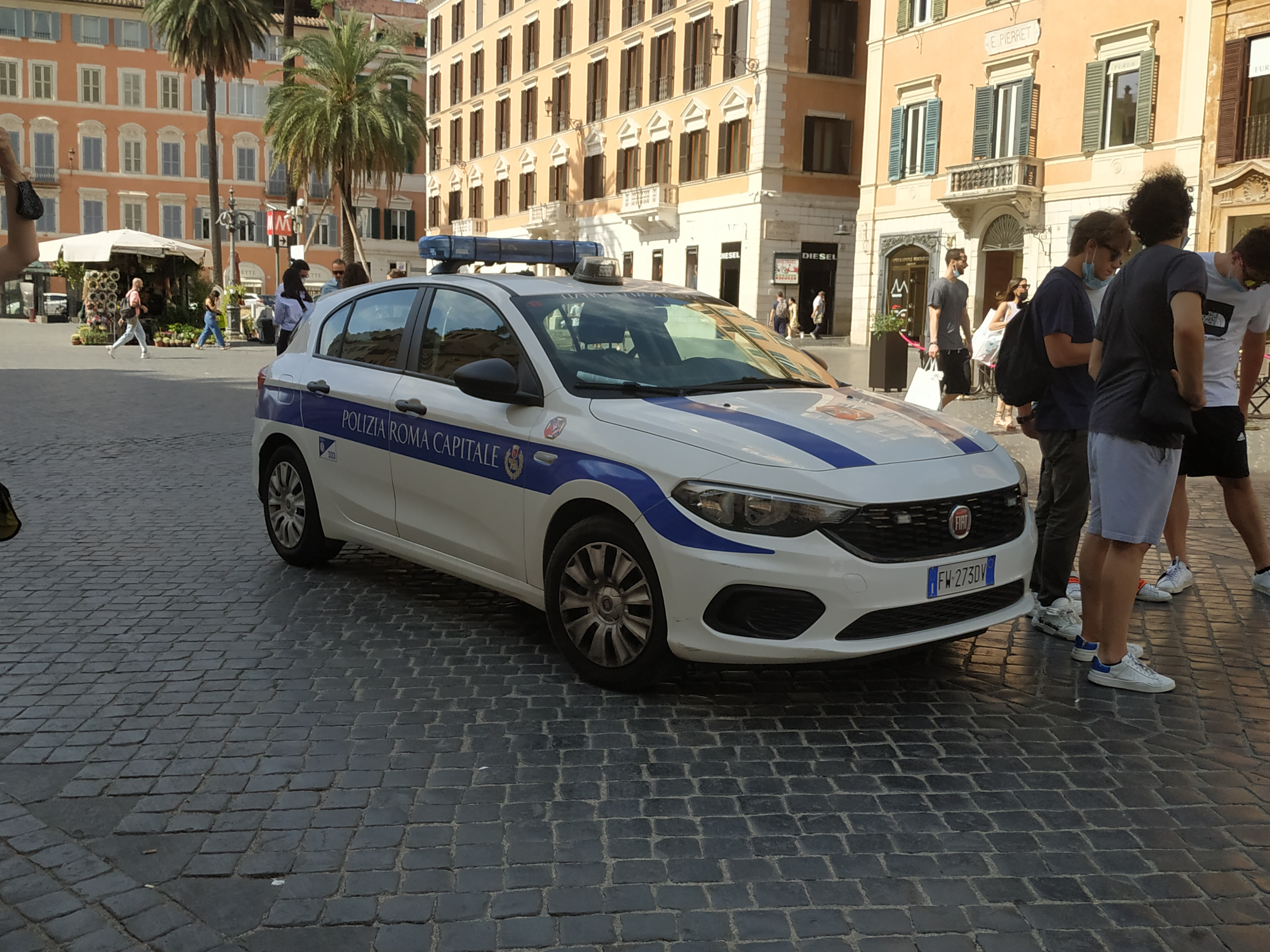
Rome Capital Police Fiat Tipo.

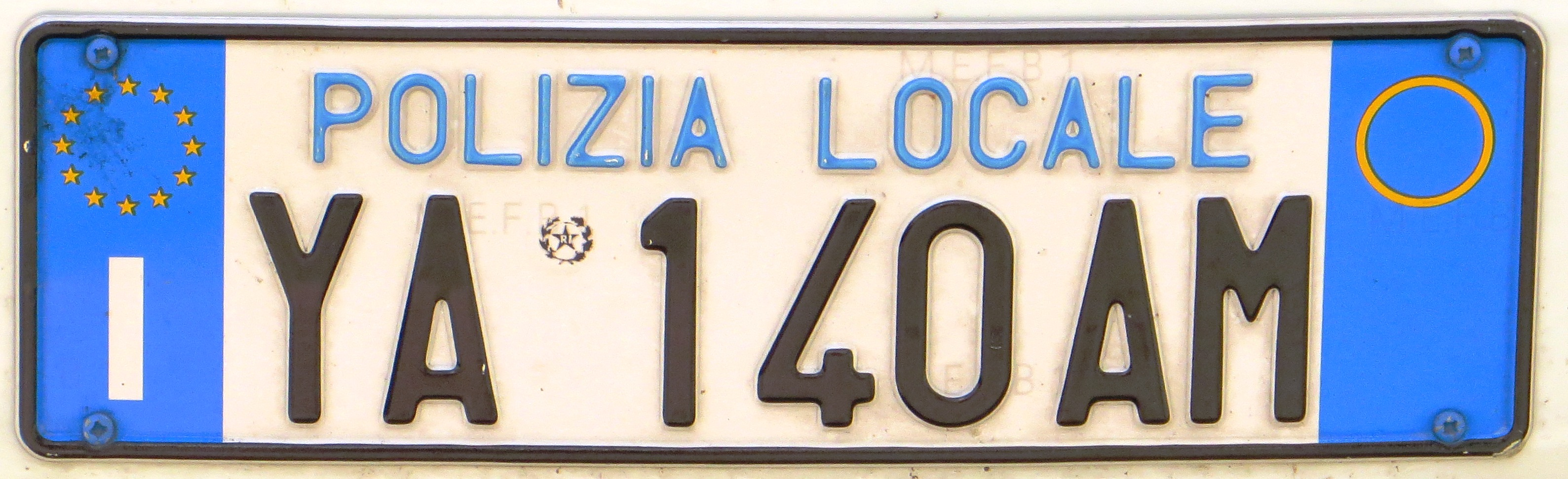
Polizia Locale number plate

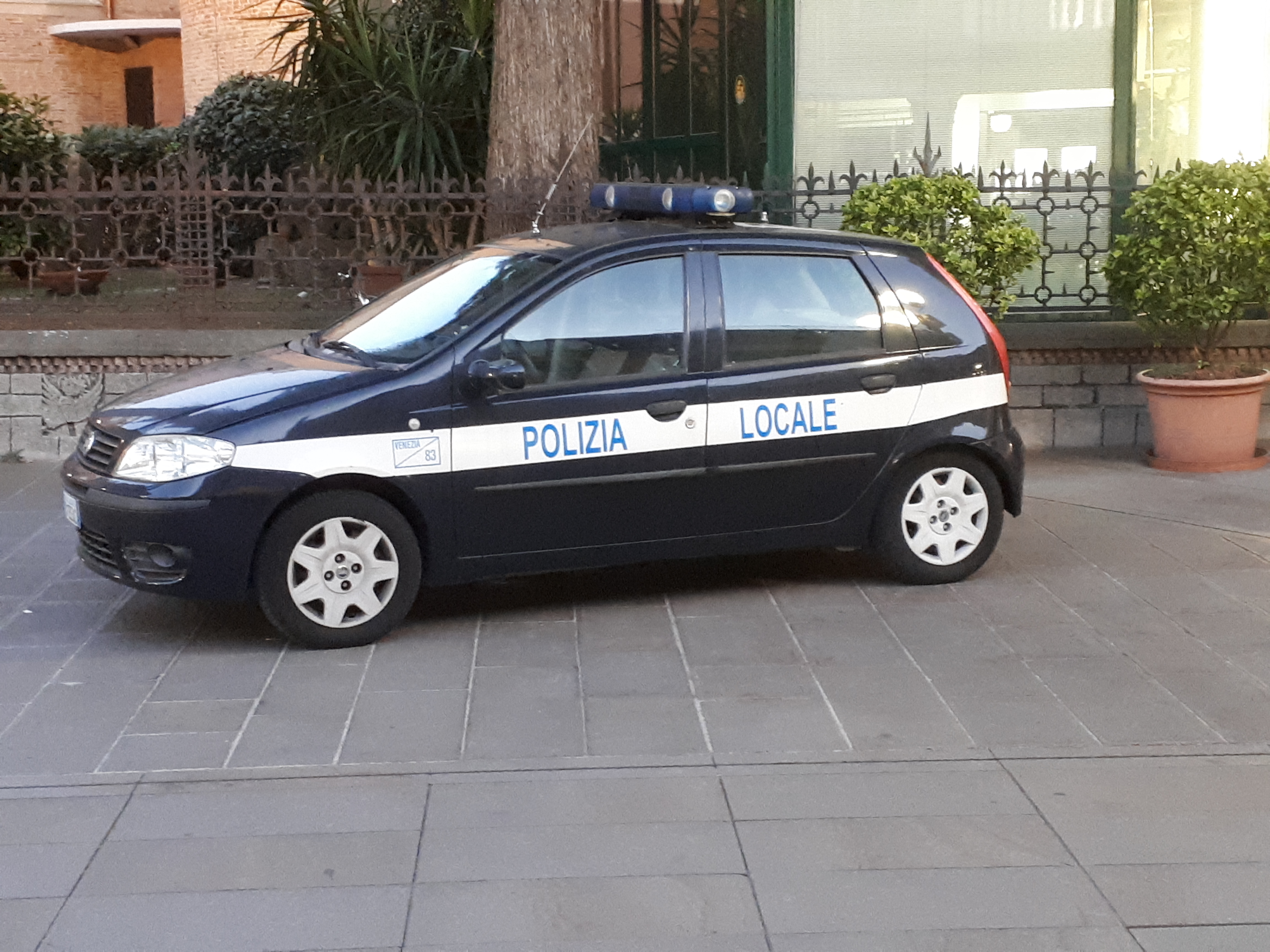
Venice Local Police dark blue Fiat Punto.

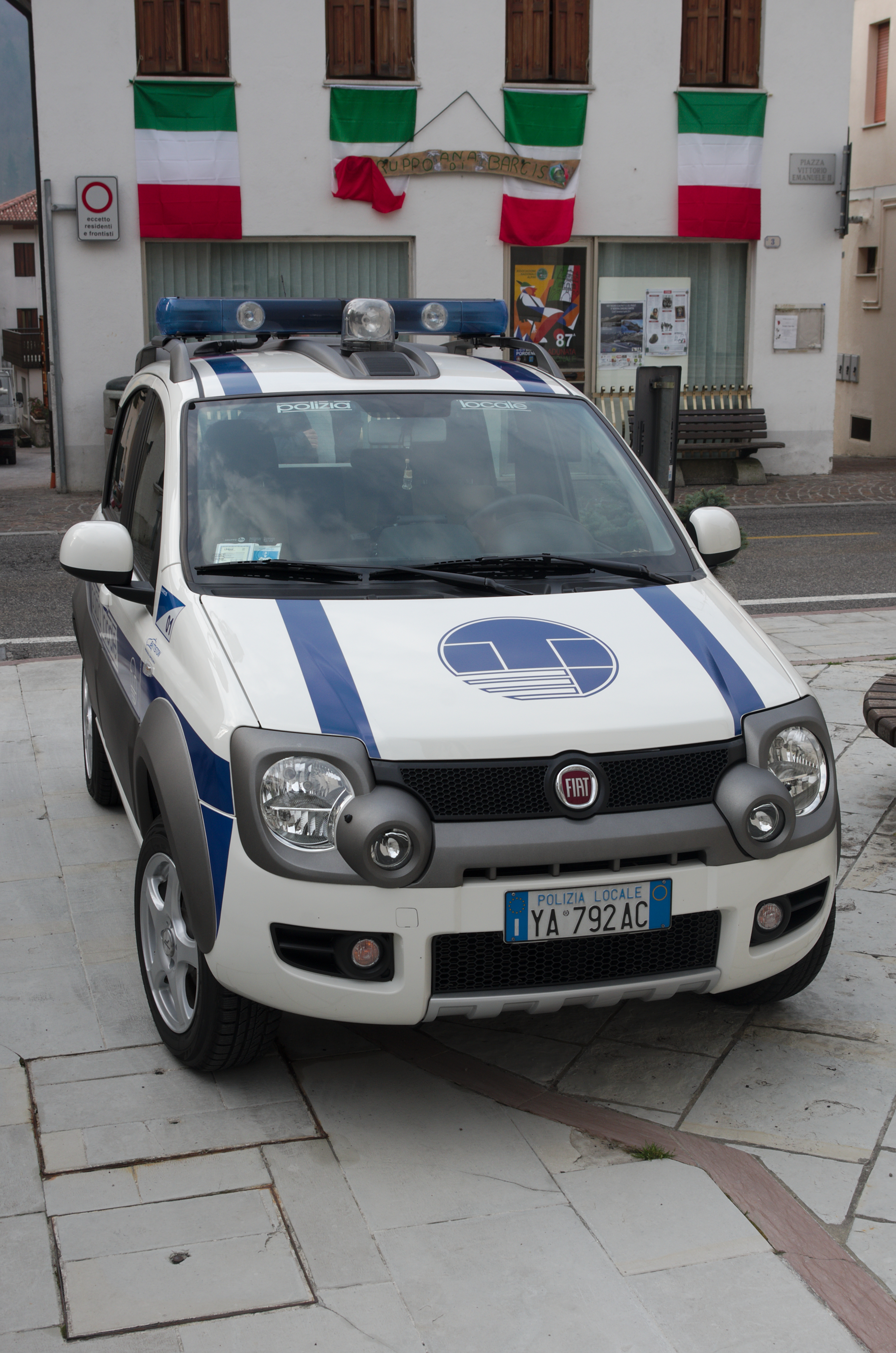
Polizia Locale Fiat Panda.

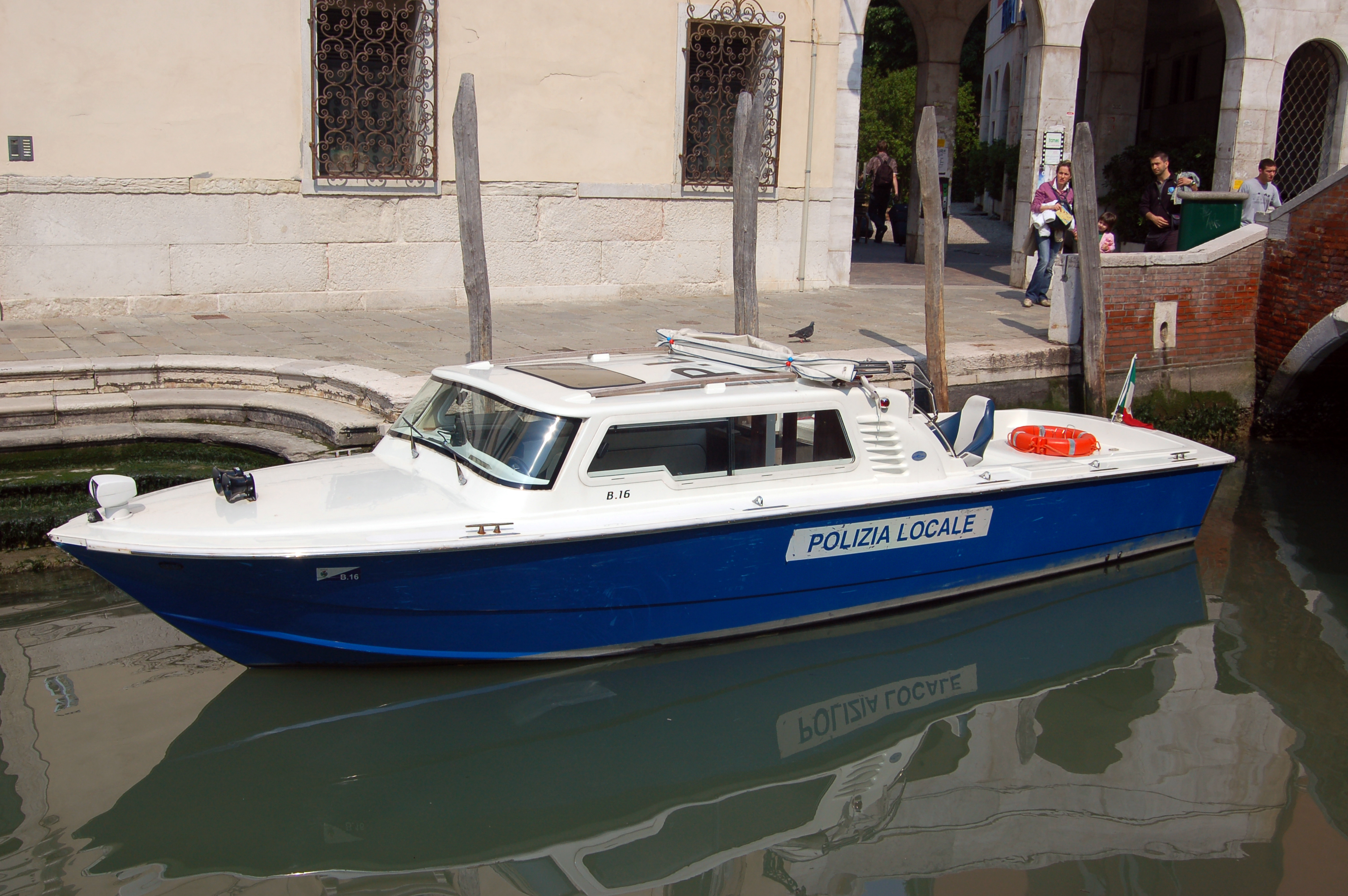
Polizia Locale boat

=== Personal Equipment ===
Standard personal equipment issued to Polizia Locale officers can include:

- Firearms: officers are generally authorized to carry firearms, typically handguns. The decision rests with local authorities, through regulations or at the mayor's office's discretion.
- Non-Lethal Options: these may include pepper spray and expandable batons. Since 2018, large cities have been authorized to conduct trials with tasers.
- Restraints: handcuffs are standard issue.
- Communication and Documentation: officers can carry two-way radios, whistles, notebooks, and sometimes bodycams.
- Traffic Control: a traffic paddle or lightbars are used for traffic direction.

=== Uniforms ===
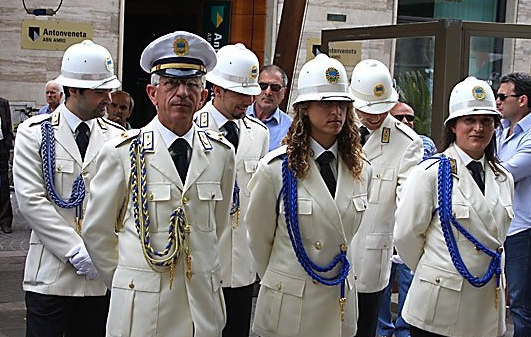
Cosenza Polizia municipale wearing custodian helmets in dress uniform.

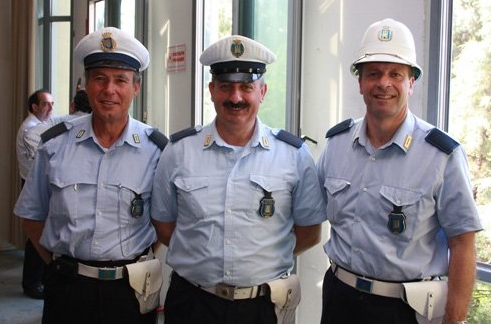
Polizia municipale of Rende.

Polizia Locale uniforms vary across regions. However, some common elements exist. Uniforms are categorized as:

- Field Uniform: for daily patrol duties.
- Office Uniform: for desk and administrative tasks.
- Ceremonial Dress Uniform: used in formal occasions.

Common components include:

Headwear:

- White custodian helmet (often for traffic duties and ceremonies).
- Peaked cap (for males), with a white, yellow, or blue top.
- Bowler cap (for females), often in white.
- Blue beret.
- Blue baseball cap.

Outerwear:

- Dark blue or white tunics.
- NATO-style jumpers and trousers.
- Polo shirts.
- High-visibility vests (for traffic control and low-light).
- Shirts: Blue or white shirts.
- Footwear: Black boots or shoes.

Accessories:

- White or black gloves.
- White or black duty belt or Sam Browne belt.

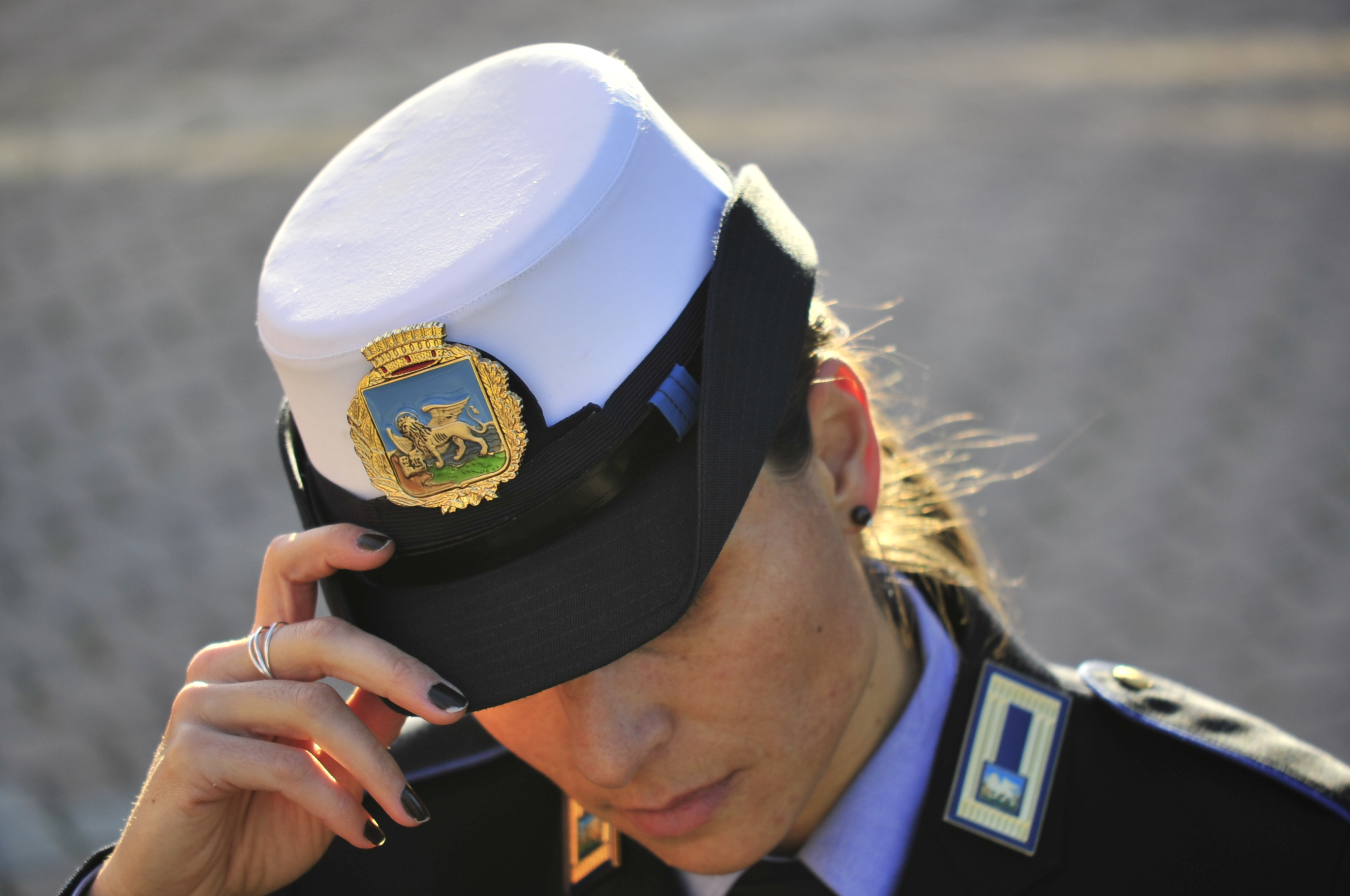
Agente of the Polizia Locale del Veneto wearing a bowler cap, typically in white

== See also ==
- Law enforcement in Italy
- Polizia Provinciale
- Local Police ranks of Lombardy
