= Agnese Carletti =

Italian politician (born 1985)

President of the Province of Siena
- Incumbent
- Assumed office 30 September 2024
- Preceded by: David Bussagli

Mayor of San Casciano dei Bagni
- Incumbent
- Assumed office 26 May 2019
- Preceded by: Paolo Morelli

Personal details
- Born: 5 January 1985 (age 41) Chiusi, Tuscany, Italy
- Party: Democratic Party
- Education: University of Siena
- Occupation: Public administration officer

Agnese Carletti (born 5 January 1985) is an Italian politician serving as president of the Province of Siena since 2024, and the first woman to hold the office. She has also served as mayor of San Casciano dei Bagni since 2019.

== Life and career ==
Carletti was born in 1985 in Chiusi, Tuscany. She graduated in philosophy from the University of Siena in 2009, specialising in moral philosophy with a thesis on the environmental ethics of philosopher John Passmore. From 2010 to 2018, she worked as a municipal police officer for the Abbadia San Salvatore municipal administration. From December 2018, she has worked as an administrative officer in the same municipality.

Carletti was elected mayor of San Casciano dei Bagni in the 2019 municipal elections, standing for the civic list Scelgo San Casciano and receiving 83.46% of the vote. She was re-elected in 2024, when her list was the only one standing in the municipality.

In September 2024, Carletti was the centre-left candidate in the election for president of the Province of Siena, supported by the Democratic Party, Italia Viva, Action and the Italian Socialist Party. She was elected on 29 September 2024, defeating Alessio Serragli, the centre-right candidate, with 55,708 weighted votes (65%). She became the first woman to serve as president of the Province of Siena.
