= Province of Siena =

Province of Italy

Province of Siena Provincia di Siena (Italian)
- Province
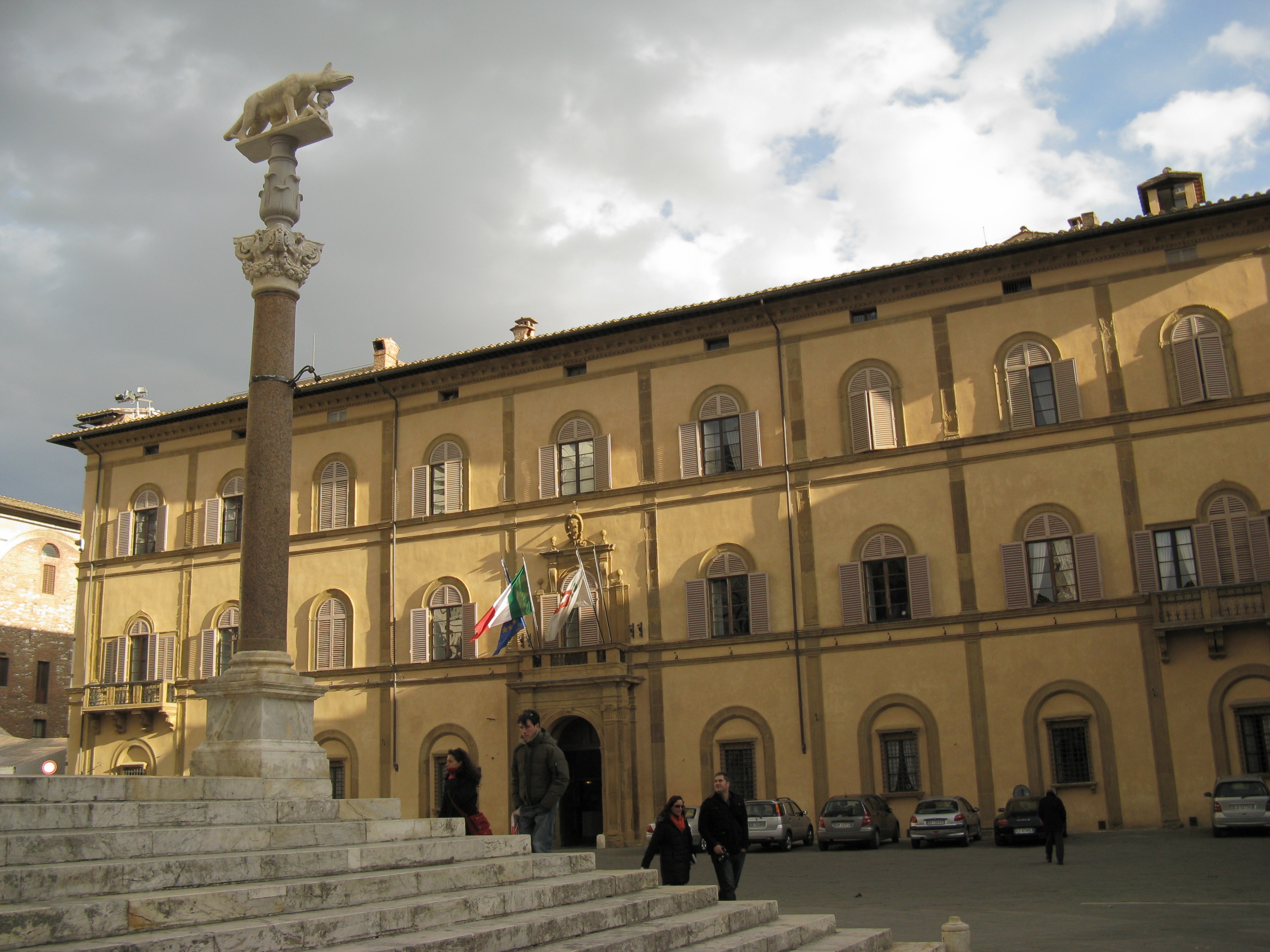
- Palazzo Reale, the provincial seat

- Coat of arms

- Location of the province of Siena in Italy
- Coordinates: 43°20′N 11°20′E
- Country: Italy
- Region: Tuscany
- Capital(s): Siena
- Municipalities: 35

Government
  - President: Agnese Carletti (PD)

Area
  - Total: 3,820.98 km^{2} (1,475.29 sq mi)

Population (2026)
  - Total: 259,502
  - Density: 67.9150/km^{2} (175.899/sq mi)

GDP
  - Total: €8.196 billion (2015)
  - Per capita: €30,374 (2015)
- Time zone: UTC+1 (CET)
  - Summer (DST): UTC+2 (CEST)
- Postal codes: 53010–53015, 53017–53025, 53027, 53030–53031, 53034–53037, 53040–53043, 53045, 53047–53049, 53100
- Telephone prefixes: 0577, 0578
- ISO 3166 code: IT-SI
- Vehicle registration: SI
- ISTAT code: 052
- Website: www.provincia.siena.it

The province of Siena (Italian: provincia di Siena [proˈvintʃa di ˈsjɛːna]) is a province in the region of Tuscany in central Italy. Its capital is the city of Siena.

It has a population of 259,502 in an area of 3,820.98 square kilometres (1,475.29 sq mi) across its 35 municipalities.

== Geography ==
The province is divided into seven historical areas:

- Alta Valdelsa
- Chianti senese
- The urban area of Monteriggioni and Siena
- Val di Merse
- Crete Senesi
- Val di Chiana senese
- Val d'Orcia and Monte Amiata

The area is predominantly hilly: the Colline del Chianti lie to the north; Monte Amiata is the highest peak at 1,738 metres (5,702 ft); Monte Cetona lies to the south; the Colline Metallifere (lit. 'Metalliferous Hills') lie to the west; and the Valdichiana lies to the east.

The province largely overlaps the territory of the former Republic of Siena, though the boundaries were not identical.

Apart from the city of Siena the principal towns are Poggibonsi, Colle di Val d'Elsa, Montepulciano, Chiusi, and San Gimignano.

The province has four World Heritage Sites: Siena, San Gimignano, Pienza and the Val d’Orcia.

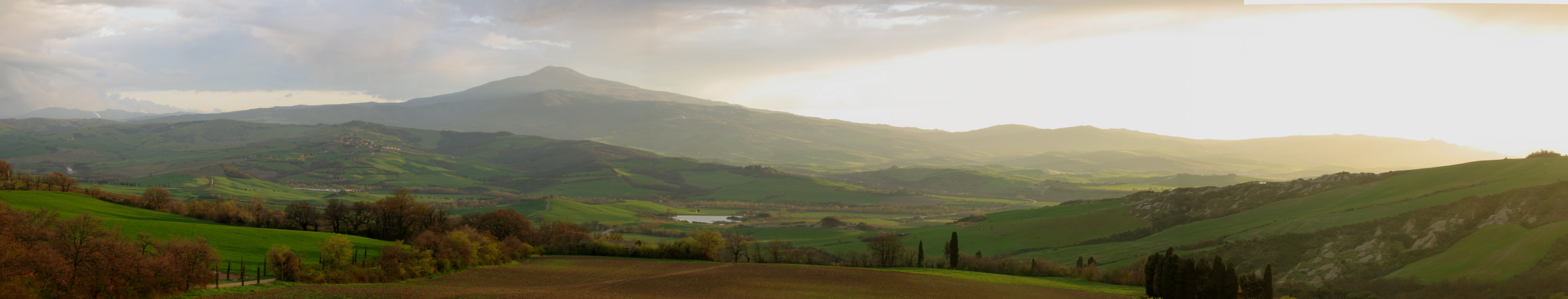
Val d'Orcia with Monte Amiata, view to the west from La Foce

== Economy ==
The chief occupations are agriculture (wheat, grapes, olives and fruit), silk culture, manufacturing, construction, wholesale and retail trade, and tourism. The province is renowned for its wine production, including Chianti (Chianti Classico and Chianti Colli Senesi), as well as other quality wines such as Brunello di Montalcino, Vino Nobile di Montepulciano and Vernaccia di San Gimignano. Other important industries include pharmaceuticals, recreational vehicle manufacturing, furniture production, and traditional crafts such as crystal glass (typical of Colle di Val d’Elsa), terracotta and leatherworking. Banking and research also contribute to investment, innovation, and economic development in the province.

== Government ==
The Province of Siena is an administrative body of intermediate level between a municipality (comune) and Tuscany region.

The three main functions devolved to the province of Siena are:

- local planning and zoning;
- provision of local police and fire services;
- transportation regulation (car registration, maintenance of local roads, etc.).

As an administrative institution, the province of Siena has its own elected bodies. From 1945 to 1995 the President of the province of Siena was chosen by the members of the Provincial Council, elected every five years by citizens. From 1995 to 2014, under provisions of the 1993 local administration reform, the President of the Province was chosen by popular election, originally every four, then every five years.

On 3 April 2014, the Italian Chamber of Deputies gave its final approval to the Law n.56/2014 which involves the transformation of the Italian provinces into "institutional bodies of second level". According to the 2014 reform, each province is headed by a President (or Commissioner) assisted by a legislative body, the Provincial Council, and an executive body, the Provincial Executive. President (Commissioner) and members of Council are elected together by mayors and city councilors of each municipality of the province respectively every four and two years. The Executive is chaired by the President (Commissioner) who appoint others members, called assessori. Since 2015, the President (Commissioner) and other members of the Council do not receive a salary.

In each province, there is also a Prefect (prefetto), a representative of the central government who heads an agency called prefettura-ufficio territoriale del governo. The Questor (questore) is the head of State's Police (Polizia di Stato) in the province and his office is called questura. There is also a province's police force depending from local government, called provincial police (polizia provinciale).

=== List of presidents ===
List of presidents of the province since 2014, the year of the Delrio reform.

President	Term start	Term end	Party
Fabrizio Nepi	12 October 2014	31 October 2018	PD
Silvio Franceschelli	31 October 2018	28 July 2022	PD
David Bussagli	23 October 2022	30 September 2024	PD
Agnese Carletti	30 September 2024	Incumbent	PD

=== Municipalities ===
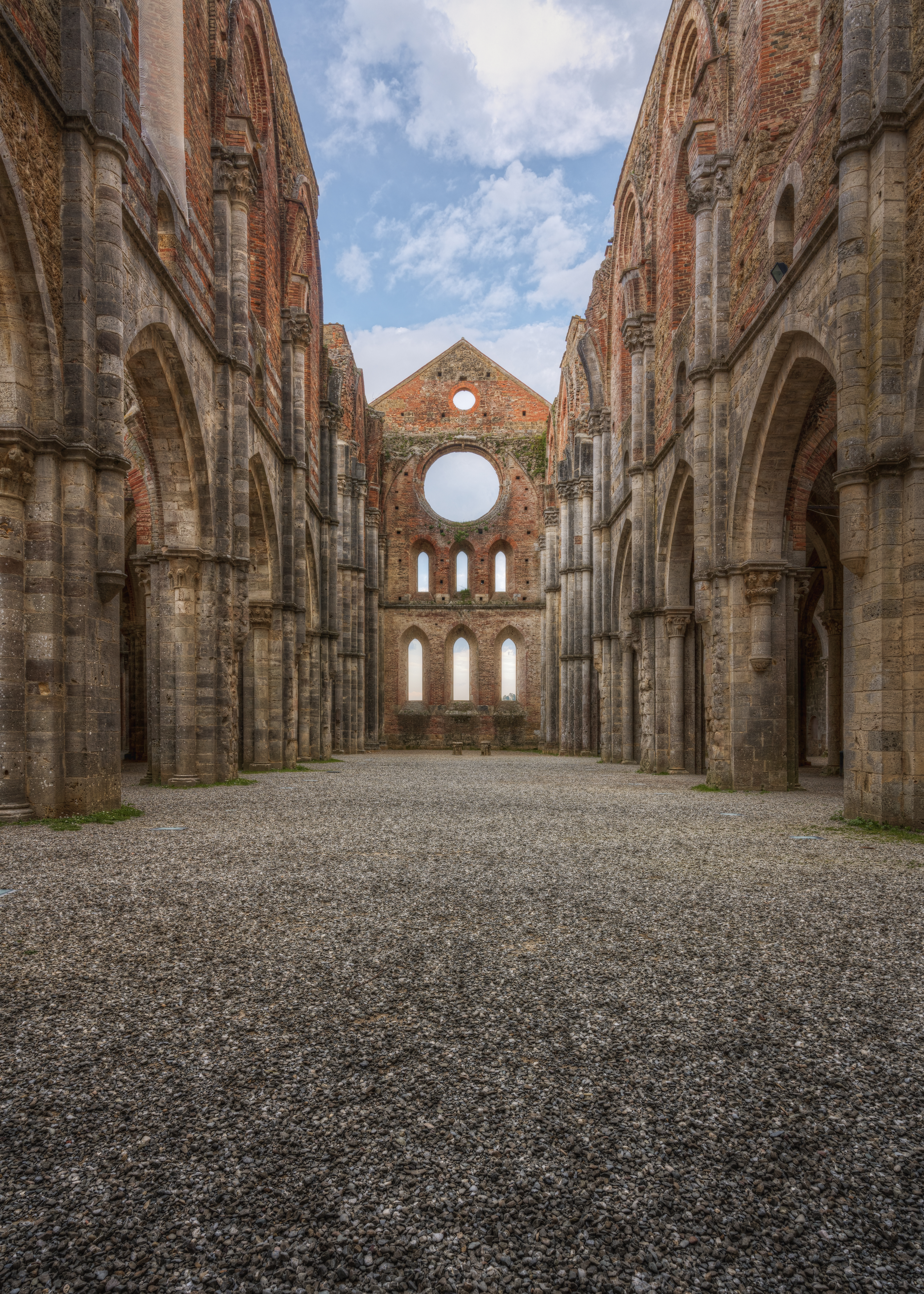
San Galgano Abbey in Chiusdino is a main attraction in the province.

There are 35 municipalities in the province:

- Abbadia San Salvatore
- Asciano
- Buonconvento
- Casole d'Elsa
- Castellina in Chianti
- Castelnuovo Berardenga
- Castiglione d'Orcia
- Cetona
- Chianciano Terme
- Chiusdino
- Chiusi
- Colle di Val d'Elsa
- Gaiole in Chianti
- Montalcino
- Montepulciano
- Monteriggioni
- Monteroni d'Arbia
- Monticiano
- Murlo
- Piancastagnaio
- Pienza
- Poggibonsi
- Radda in Chianti
- Radicofani
- Radicondoli
- Rapolano Terme
- San Casciano dei Bagni
- San Gimignano
- San Quirico d'Orcia
- Sarteano
- Siena
- Sinalunga
- Sovicille
- Torrita di Siena
- Trequanda

== Demographics ==
As of 2026, the population is 259,502, of which 48.9% are male, and 51.1% are female. Minors make up 13.8% of the population, and seniors make up 27.4%.

Historical population

Year	Pop.	±%
1861	194,643	—
1871	206,631	+6.2%
1881	207,013	+0.2%
1901	233,874	+13.0%
1911	244,724	+4.6%
1921	251,088	+2.6%
1931	262,666	+4.6%
1936	268,459	+2.2%

Year	Pop.	±%
1951	277,437	+3.3%
1961	270,062	−2.7%
1971	257,221	−4.8%
1981	255,118	−0.8%
1991	250,740	−1.7%
2001	252,288	+0.6%
2011	266,621	+5.7%
2021	261,209	−2.0%

Source: ISTAT

=== Immigration ===
As of 2025, immigrants make up 15.4% of the total population. The 5 largest foreign countries of birth are Albania, Romania, Kosovo, Ukraine, and Pakistan.
