= Autostrada A58 =

Controlled-access highway in Italy

Autostrada A58
- Tangenziale Est Esterna di Milano; Milan external east ring road

Route information
- Maintained by ANAS
- Length: 32 km (20 mi)
- Existed: 2014–present

Major junctions
- Beltway around Milan
- North end: Agrate Brianza
- A4 in Agrate Brianza; A35 in Liscate; A1 in Cerro al Lambro
- South end: Cerro al Lambro

Location
- Country: Italy
- Regions: Lombardy

Highway system
- Roads in Italy; Autostrade; State; Regional; Provincial; Municipal
← A 57	→ A 59

Map of Milan's ring roads with the Autostrada A58 highlighted

Autostrada A58 or Tangenziale Est Esterna di Milano ("Milan external east ring road") is an autostrada (Italian for "motorway") 32 kilometres (20 mi) long in Italy located in the region of Lombardy. It is the second east ring road of Milan after the Autostrada A51, managed by the company Tangenziale Esterna S.p.a. The Autostrada A58 ring road connects, on the east side of Milan, the Autostrada A4 with the Autostrada A1 via the Autostrada A35.

Together with the Autostrada A50 (Milan west ring road), the Autostrada A51 (Milan east ring road) and the Autostrada A52 (Milan north ring road), it is the largest system of ring roads around a city in Italy, for a total length greater than 100 kilometres (62 mi). By adding the urban sections of Autostrada A1 and Autostrada A4, which runs parallel to the Milan north ring road by connecting Autostrada A51, Autostrada A50 and Autostrada A58, to the four ring roads, a system of urban highways that totally surrounds the city.

== History ==
On 11 June 2012, the first construction site of the external ring road opens. On 23 July 2014, the entire section of the Autostrada A35 or BRE.BE.MI opens and with it also the first completed section of the external ring road, called "Arco TEEM, enters into operation.", to allow reaching the Pozzuolo Martesana and the Liscate barrier. The opening of the entire route took place on Saturday 16 May 2015, while 2016 was the deadline for the realization of all the related works.

== Route ==
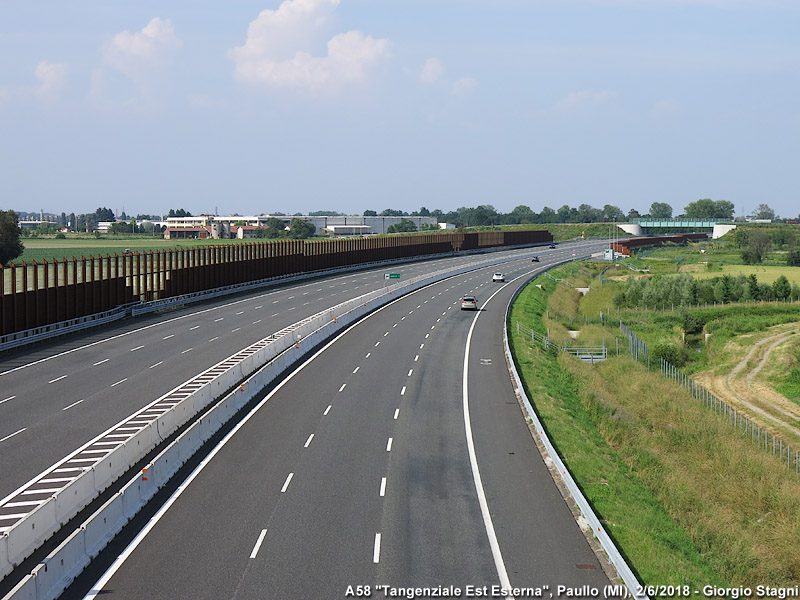
Autostrada A58 near Paullo

TANGENZIALE EST ESTERNA DI MILANO; Autostrada A58
Exit	↓km↓	↑km↑	Province	European Route
Autostrada A4 (Turin - Venice - Trieste); Milan Malpensa Airport; Milan Bergamo Airport; Tangenziale Nord di Milano	0.0 km (0 mi)	32.0 km (19.9 mi)	MB	--
Pessano con Bornago	1.7 km (1.1 mi)	30.3 km (18.8 mi)	MI	--
Gessate; Padana Superiore (Gessate - Gorgonzola - Cassina de' Pecchi - Cernusco sul Naviglio); MM2 Gessate; Milano viale Palmanova	4.1 km (2.5 mi)	27.9 km (17.3 mi)	MI	--
Pozzuolo Martesana; Cassanese (Melzo - Vignate - Pioltello - Segrate); Tangenziale Est di Milano; Milano Lambrate	8.2 km (5.1 mi)	23.8 km (14.8 mi)	MI	--
Autostrada A35 (Brescia - Treviglio)	9.7 km (6.0 mi)	22.3 km (13.9 mi)	MI	--
Liscate; Rivoltana ( Milan Linate Airport - Rodano - Truccazzano - Rivolta d'Adda); Tangenziale Est di Milano; Milano viale Forlanini	14.4 km (8.9 mi)	17.6 km (10.9 mi)	MI	--
Paullo; Paullese (Paullo - Crema - Cremona); Tangenziale Est di Milano; MM3 San Donato; Milano Rogoredo - corso Lodi	18.5 km (11.5 mi)	13.5 km (8.4 mi)	MI	--
Vizzolo Predabissi; Via Emilia (Melegnano - Lodi - Piacenza)	29.4 km (18.3 mi)	2.6 km (1.6 mi)	MI	--
Autostrada A1 Milano Corvetto - Bologna - Naples; Tangenziale Ovest di Milano; Tangenziale Est di Milano	32.0 km (19.9 mi)	0.0 km (0 mi)	MI	--

== See also ==
- Autostrade of Italy
- Roads in Italy
- Transport in Italy

=== Other Italian roads ===
- State highways (Italy)
- Regional road (Italy)
- Provincial road (Italy)
- Municipal road (Italy)
