= Autostrada A35 =

Controlled-access highway in Italy

Autostrada A35
- BreBeMi

Route information
- Maintained by BreBeMi S.p.A.
- Length: 54.8 km (34.1 mi)
- Existed: 2014–present

Major junctions
- East end: Castegnato
- A4 in Castegnato; A4 and A21 in Travagliato; A58, A1, A4 and A51 in Pozzuolo Martesana
- West end: Pozzuolo Martesana

Location
- Country: Italy
- Regions: Lombardy

Highway system
- Roads in Italy; Autostrade; State; Regional; Provincial; Municipal
← A 34	→ A 36

Autostrada A35, also known by the initials BreBeMi from the initials of the three Italian provinces of Brescia, Bergamo and Milan, is an autostrada (Italian for 'motorway') 54.8 kilometres (34.1 mi) long in Italy located in the region of Lombardy that connects the cities of Brescia and Milan with a route positioned further south than the route of the Autostrada A4. The Autostrada A35 is managed by the homonymous company BreBeMi S.p.A. (Note: Società di Progetto Brebemi S.p.A.)

== Route ==
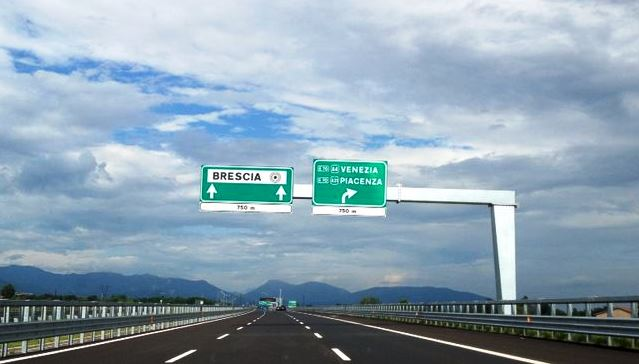
Autostrada A35 near Rovato

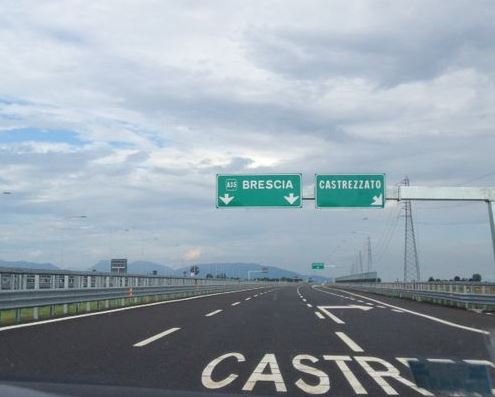
Autostrada A35 near Castrezzato

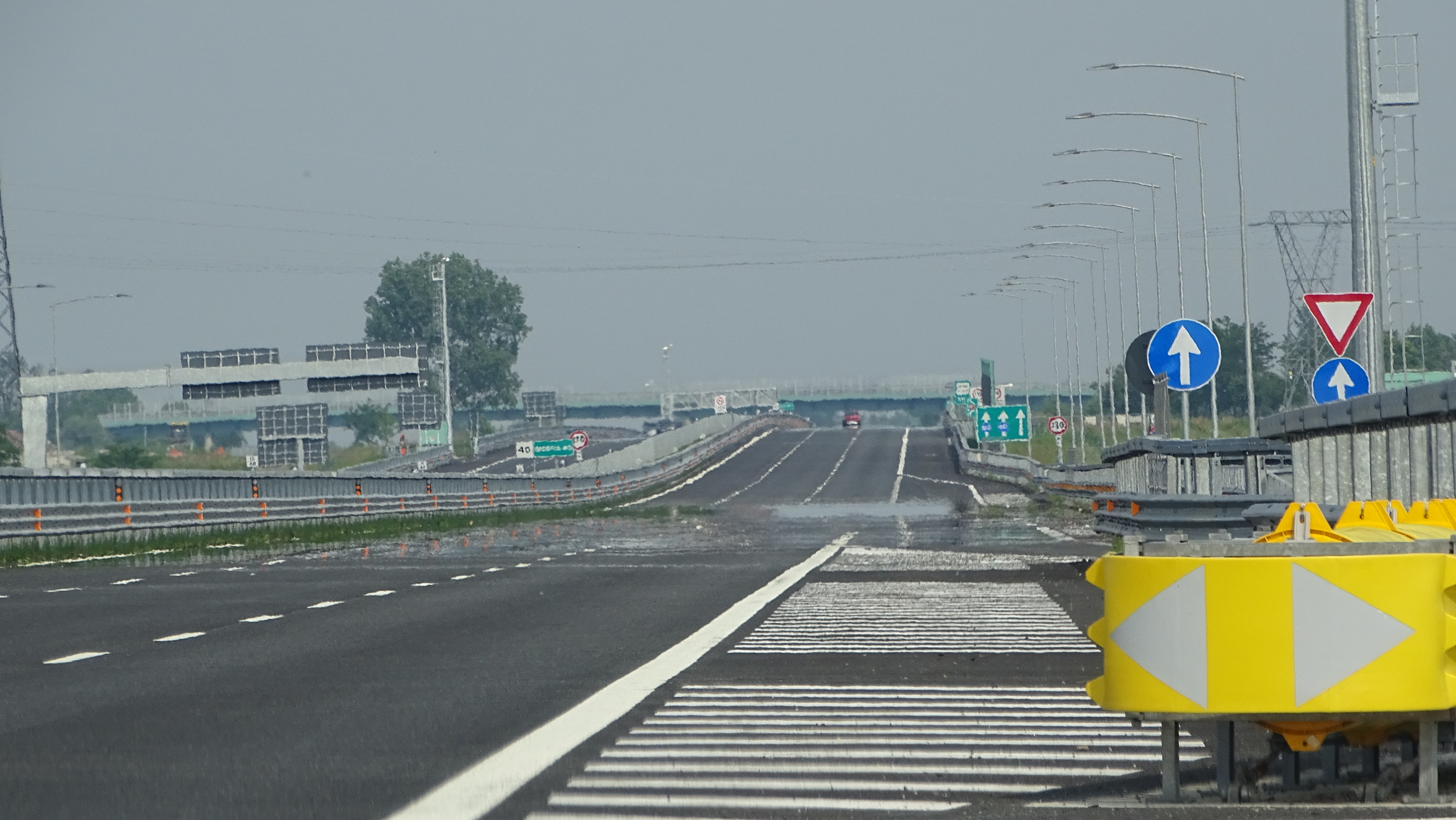
Autostrada A35 near Treviglio

BRESCIA - MILAN; BreBeMi - Brescia Bergamo Milan
Exit	↓km↓	↑km↑	Province	European Route
Autostrada A4 (Verona-Vicenza-Padua-Venice)	0.0 km (0 mi)	54.8 km (34.1 mi)	BS	--
Toll gate Castegnato	0.5 km (0.31 mi)	54.3 km (33.7 mi)	BS	--
Tangenziale Sud di Brescia; Brescia Centro	0.8 km (0.50 mi)	54.0 km (33.6 mi)	BS	--
Travagliato Est	1.4 km (0.87 mi)	53.4 km (33.2 mi)	BS	--
Travagliato Ovest	3.8 km (2.4 mi)	51.0 km (31.7 mi)	BS	--
Ospitaletto-Montichiari; Venice; Cremona-Piacenza	5.3 km (3.3 mi)	49.5 km (30.8 mi)	BS	--
Rovato Sud	8.9 km (5.5 mi)	45.9 km (28.5 mi)	BS	--
Castrezzato	10.8 km (6.7 mi)	44.0 km (27.3 mi)	BS	--
Chiari Est (Note: Exit towards Milan, entry towards Brescia.)	12.3 km (7.6 mi)	42.5 km (26.4 mi)	BS	--
Toll gate Chiari Est	14.5 km (9.0 mi)	40.3 km (25.0 mi)	BS	--
Chiari Ovest	16.1 km (10.0 mi)	38.7 km (24.0 mi)	BS	--
Calcio	23.5 km (14.6 mi)	31.3 km (19.4 mi)	BG	--
Romano di Lombardia; Cremasca (Bergamo-Crema-Codogno)	30.3 km (18.8 mi)	24.5 km (15.2 mi)	BG	--
Bariano	35.0 km (21.7 mi)	19.8 km (12.3 mi)	BG	--
Caravaggio; Santuario di Caravaggio; Rest area "Adda Sud ed Adda Nord"	39.4 km (24.5 mi)	15.4 km (9.6 mi)	BG	--
Treviglio del Tonale e della Mendola (Verdello-Bergamo-Lovere); Padana Superiore (Turin-Brescia-Verona-Venice-Trieste)	46.2 km (28.7 mi)	8.6 km (5.3 mi)	BG	--
Tangenziale Est Esterna di Milano; Autostrada A1 (Bologna-Florence-Rome-Naples); Autostrada A4 (Turin-Bergamo-Venice); Tangenziale Est di Milano	54.8 km (34.1 mi)	0.0 km (0 mi)	MI	--

== See also ==
- Autostrade of Italy
- Roads in Italy
- Transport in Italy

=== Other Italian roads ===
- State highways (Italy)
- Regional road (Italy)
- Provincial road (Italy)
- Municipal road (Italy)
