= Autostrada A51 =

Controlled-access highway in Italy

Coordinates: 45.53824°N 9.30532°E

Autostrada A51
- Tangenziale Est di Milano; Milan east ring road
- The motorway A51 and the connecting motorways

Route information
- Maintained by Milano Serravalle - Milano Tangenziali
- Length: 29.4 km (18.3 mi)
- Existed: 1973–present

Major junctions
- Beltway around Milan
- South end: Milan
- A1 in Milan; A52 in Cologno Monzese; A4 in Agrate Brianza
- North end: Usmate Velate

Location
- Country: Italy
- Regions: Lombardy

Highway system
- Roads in Italy; Autostrade; State; Regional; Provincial; Municipal
← A 50	→ A 52

Map of Milan's ring roads with the Autostrada A51 highlighted

Autostrada A51 or Tangenziale Est di Milano ("Milan east ring road") is an autostrada (Italian for "motorway") 29.3 kilometres (18.2 mi) long in Italy located in the region of Lombardy and tangent to the city and suburban area of Milan in its eastern part, managed by Milano Serravalle – Milano Tangenziali.

Together with the Autostrada A50 (Milan west ring road), the Autostrada A52 (Milan north ring road) and the Autostrada A58 (Milan external east ring road), it is the largest system of ring roads around a city in Italy, for a total length greater than 100 kilometres (62 mi). By adding the urban sections of Autostrada A1 and Autostrada A4, which runs parallel to the Milan north ring road by connecting Autostrada A51, Autostrada A50 and Autostrada A58, to the four ring roads, a system of urban highways that totally surrounds the city. The traffic flow that affects this stretch of motorway is over 170,000 daily transits.

== Route ==
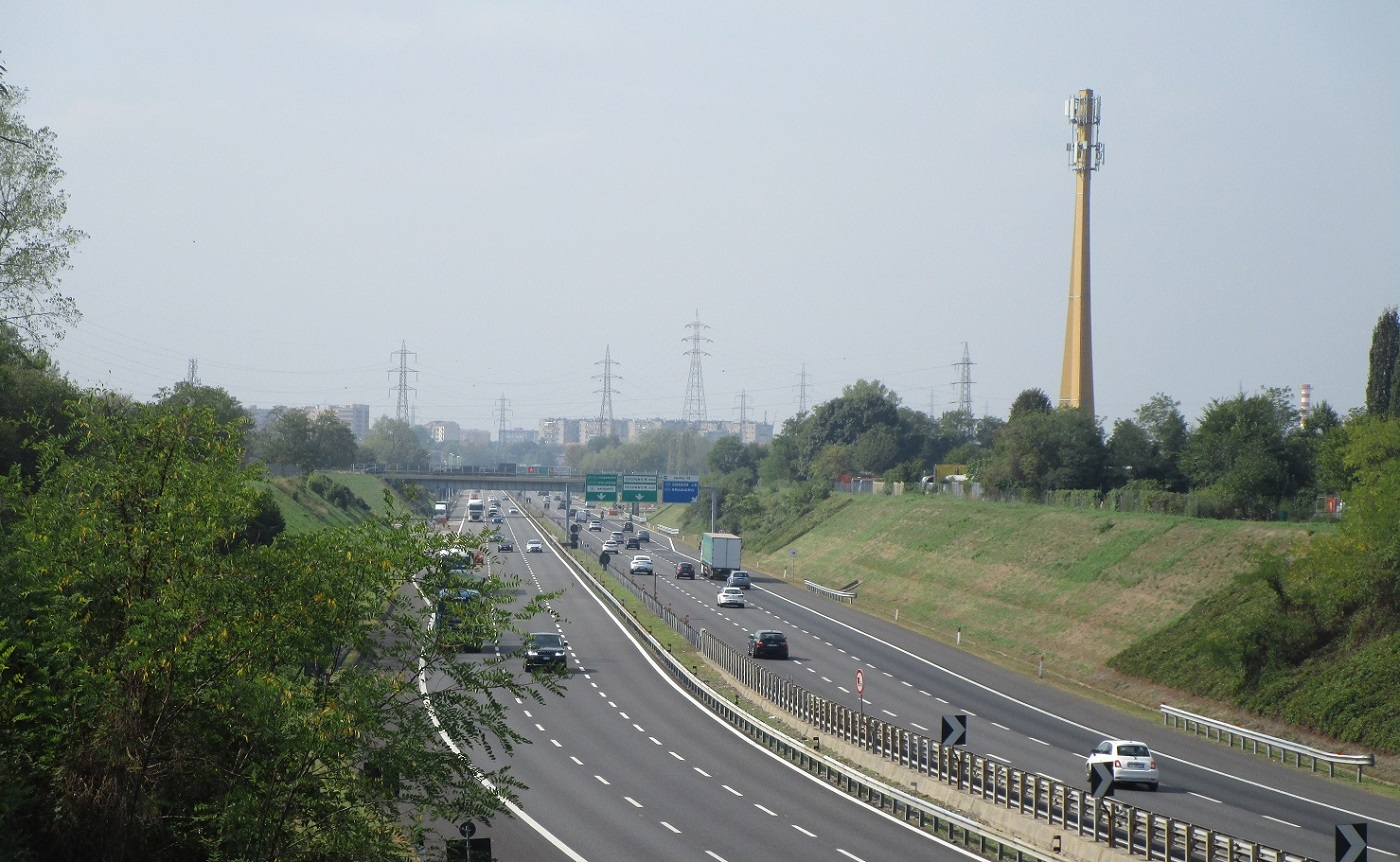
Autostrada A51 near Brugherio

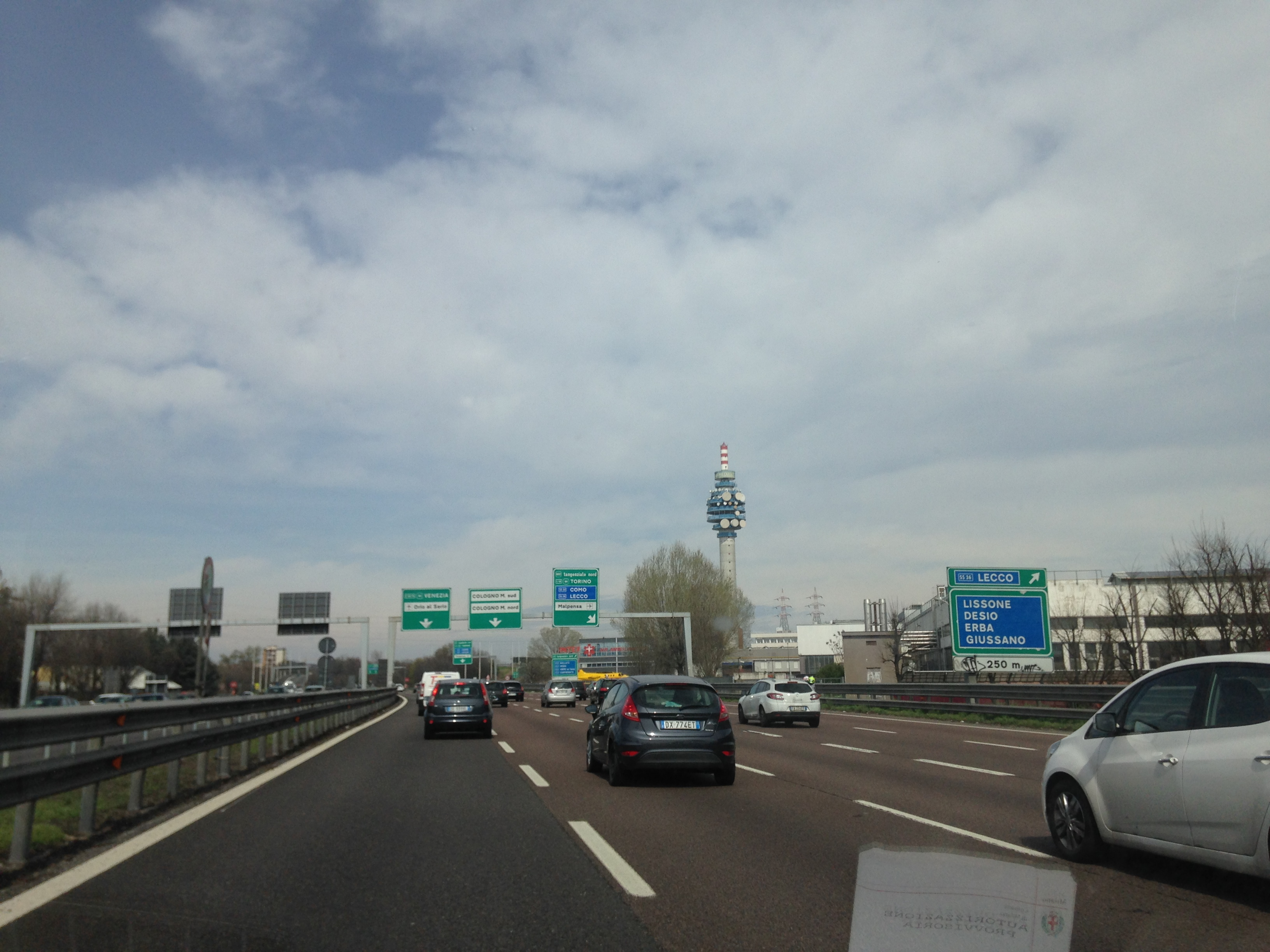
Autostrada A51 near Cologno Monzese

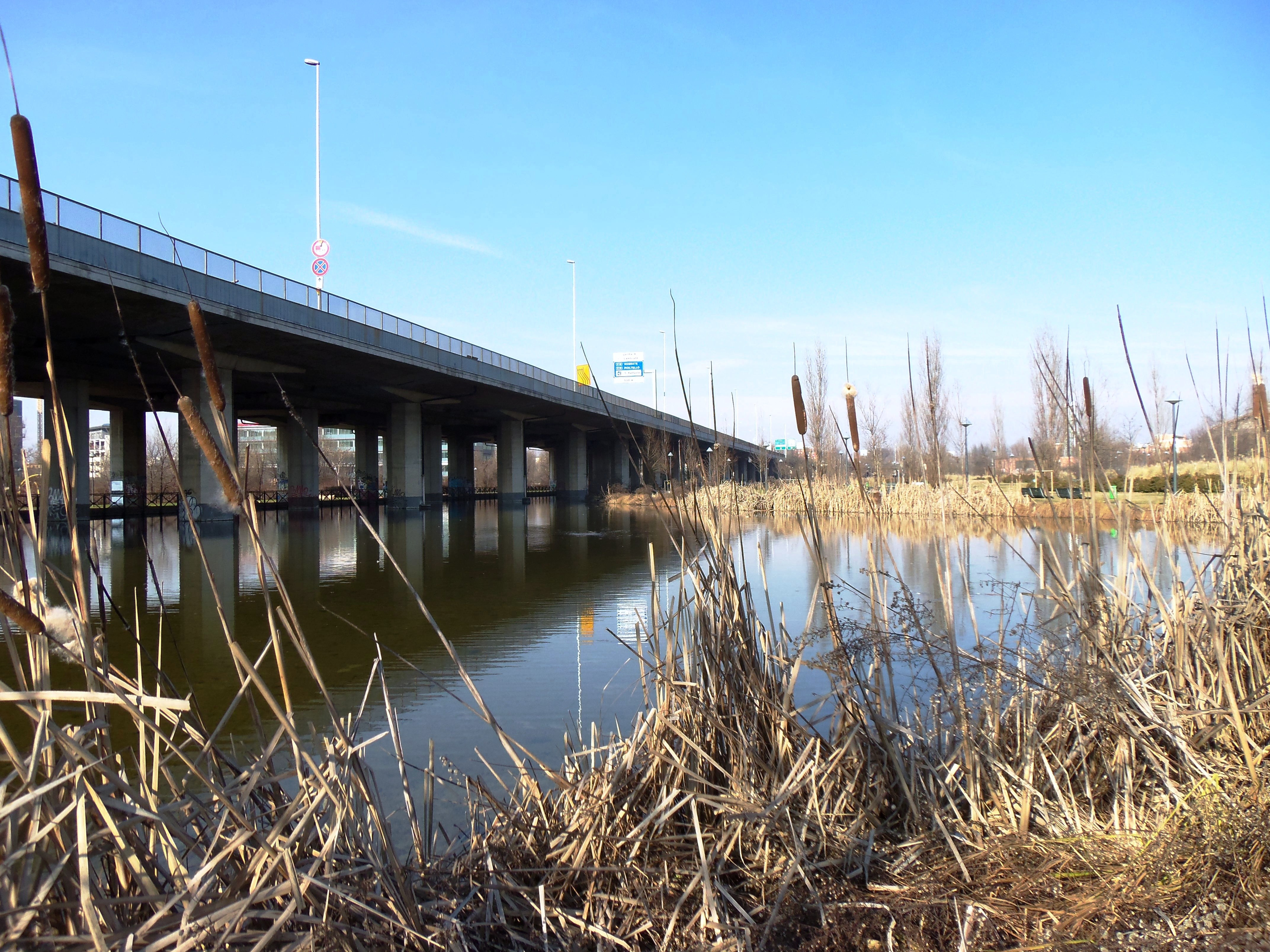
Autostrada A51 bridge over the Lambro river

TANGENZIALE EST DI MILANO; Autostrada A51
Exit	↓km↓	↑km↑	Province	European Route
Raccordo A1-A51; Raccordo A1-Piazzale Corvetto; Milan - Naples	0.0 km (0 mi)	29.3 km (18.2 mi)	MI	--
Piazzale Corvetto - Via Emilia; Milan - San Donato Milanese	0.5 km (0.31 mi)	28.8 km (17.9 mi)	MI	--
Paullo - Paullese; MM3 San Donato	1.0 km (0.62 mi)	28.3 km (17.6 mi)	MI	--
Via Mecenate; Peschiera Borromeo; Antica trattoria Bagutto	2.5 km (1.6 mi)	26.8 km (16.7 mi)	MI	--
C.A.M.M. Consorzio Autostazione Merci di Milano	3.0 km (1.9 mi)	26.3 km (16.3 mi)	MI	--
Milan Viale Forlanini; Milan Linate Airport; Tangenziale Est Esterna di Milano	4.0 km (2.5 mi)	25.3 km (15.7 mi)	MI	--
Via Rubattino; Segrate	6.0 km (3.7 mi)	23.3 km (14.5 mi)	MI	--
Segrate; Tangenziale Est Esterna di Milano	6.7 km (4.2 mi)	22.6 km (14.0 mi)	MI	--
Lambrate	7.0 km (4.3 mi)	22.3 km (13.9 mi)	MI	--
Rest area "Cascina Gobba" (Note: U-turn via underpass)	9.7 km (6.0 mi)	19.6 km (12.2 mi)	MI	--
Cascina Gobba - Via Padova; Padana Superiore - Vimodrone; V.le Palmanova; MM2 Gobba; San Raffaele Hospital	10.5 km (6.5 mi)	18.8 km (11.7 mi)	MI	--
Tangenziale Nord (Note: Exit possible only in the north direction, entrance only in the south direction.); Milan Malpensa Airport	11.5 km (7.1 mi)	17.8 km (11.1 mi)	MI	--
Cologno Ovest; Connection with the Autostrada A52 in the south direction.	12.0 km (7.5 mi)	17.3 km (10.7 mi)	MI	--
Cologno Est; MM2 Cologno Nord; Brugherio	14.0 km (8.7 mi)	15.3 km (9.5 mi)	MI	--
Rest area "Cologno Est"	15.7 km (9.8 mi)	13.6 km (8.5 mi)	MI	--
Cernusco S.N. Brugherio sud	16.0 km (9.9 mi)	13.3 km (8.3 mi)	MI	--
Carugate	18.0 km (11.2 mi)	11.3 km (7.0 mi)	MI	--
Rest area "Carugate"	19.0 km (11.8 mi)	10.3 km (6.4 mi)	MB	--
Toll gate Agrate Brianza	19.5 km (12.1 mi)	9.8 km (6.1 mi)	MB	--
Turin - Venice; Milan Bergamo Airport	20.5 km (12.7 mi)	8.8 km (5.5 mi)	MB	--
Agrate Brianza (Note: Connection with the Autostrada A4 only in the south direction.)	21.0 km (13.0 mi)	8.3 km (5.2 mi)	MB	--
Monza Est	21.2 km (13.2 mi)	8.1 km (5.0 mi)	MB	--
Concorezzo (Note: Exit only southbound, entrance only northbound.); Agrate nord	22.0 km (13.7 mi)	7.3 km (4.5 mi)	MB	--
SP 41 C.na Morosina - Burago	24.0 km (14.9 mi)	5.3 km (3.3 mi)	MB	--
Vimercate Sud - Q.re Torri Bianche; Villasanta - Arcore	25.0 km (15.5 mi)	4.3 km (2.7 mi)	MB	--
Vimercate Centro - Oreno; Vimercate Hospital	26.0 km (16.2 mi)	3.3 km (2.1 mi)	MB	--
Vimercate Nord - Velasca	28.0 km (17.4 mi)	1.3 km (0.81 mi)	MB	--
Rest area "Vimercate ovest" (Note: Only in the south direction.)	--	0.8 km (0.50 mi)	MB	--
Carnate	29.0 km (18.0 mi)	0.3 km (0.19 mi)	MB	--
Usmate Velate Sud	29.2 km (18.1 mi)	0.1 km (0.062 mi)	MB	--
Briantea	29.3 km (18.2 mi)	0.0 km (0 mi)	MB	--

== See also ==
- Autostrade of Italy
- Roads in Italy
- Transport in Italy

=== Other Italian roads ===
- State highways (Italy)
- Regional road (Italy)
- Provincial road (Italy)
- Municipal road (Italy)
