= Autostrada A52 =

Controlled-access highway in Italy

Autostrada A52
- Tangenziale Nord di Milano; Milan north ring road

Route information
- Maintained by Milano Serravalle - Milano Tangenziali
- Length: 26.4 km (16.4 mi)
- Existed: 1994–present

Major junctions
- Beltway around Milan
- East end: Cologno Monzese
- A51 in Cologno Monzese; A4 in Monza; A8 in Baranzate; A4 in Rho; A50 in Rho
- West end: Rho

Location
- Country: Italy
- Regions: Lombardy

Highway system
- Roads in Italy; Autostrade; State; Regional; Provincial; Municipal
← A 51	→ A 53

Map of Milan's ring roads with the Autostrada A52 highlighted

Autostrada A52 or Tangenziale Nord di Milano ("Milan north ring road") is an autostrada (Italian for "motorway") 26.4 kilometres (16.4 mi) long in Italy located in the region of Lombardy and tangent to the city and suburban area of Milan that connects the northern suburban area of the city, managed by Milano Serravalle – Milano Tangenziali. On 29 March 2005, the second section to the west was opened, not connected to the original Autostrada A52, connecting the SS 33 and the Autostrada A8.

Together with the Autostrada A50 (Milan west ring road), the Autostrada A51 (Milan east ring road) and the Autostrada A58 (Milan external east ring road), it is the largest system of ring roads around a city in Italy, for a total length greater than 100 kilometres (62 mi). By adding the urban sections of Autostrada A1 and Autostrada A4, which runs parallel to the Milan north ring road by connecting Autostrada A51, Autostrada A50 and Autostrada A58, to the four ring roads, a system of urban highways that totally surrounds the city.

== Route ==
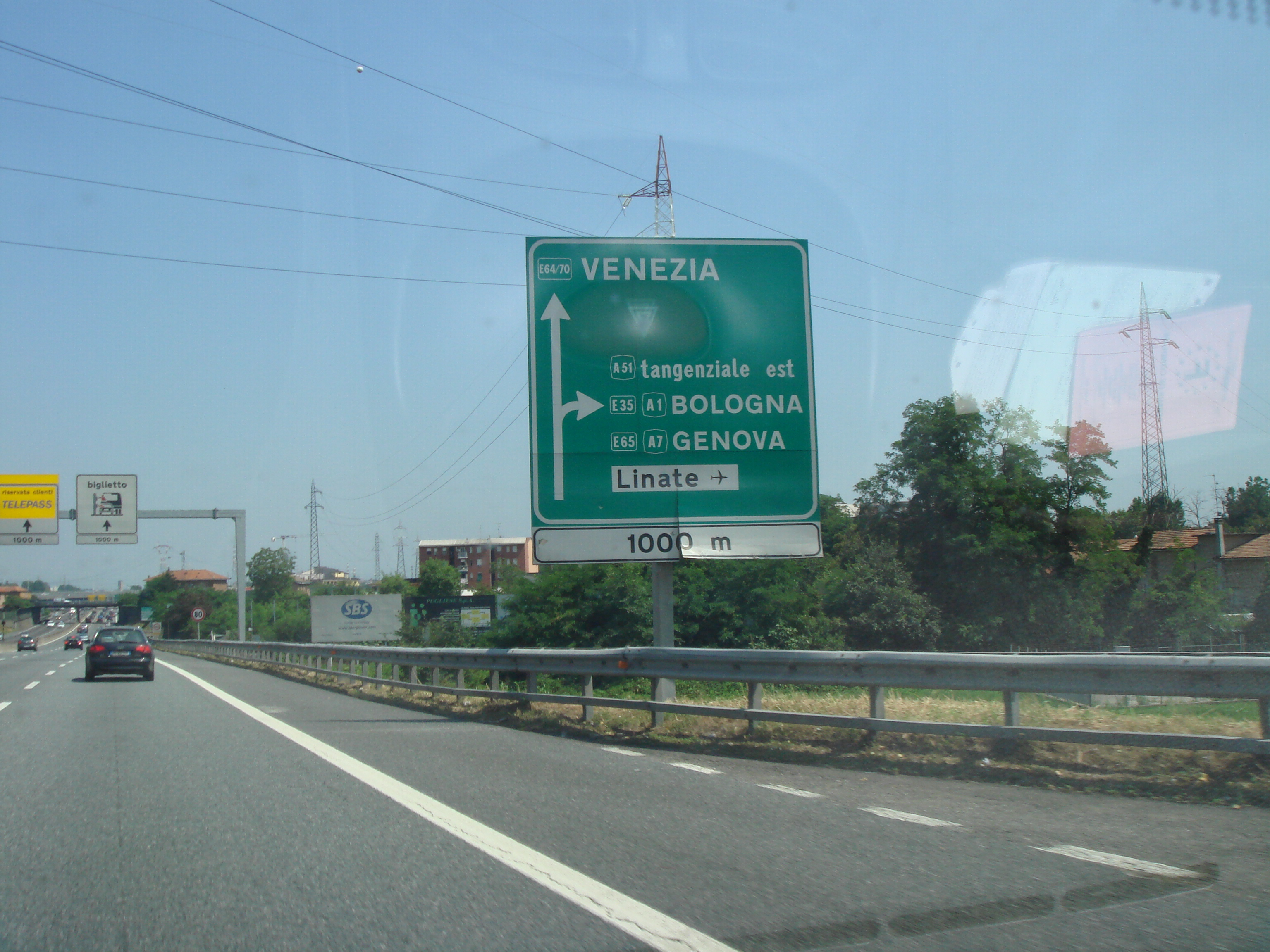
Autostrada A52 near Monza

TANGENZIALE NORD DI MILANO; Autostrada A52
Exit	↓km↓	↑km↑	Province	European Route
Tangenziale Est di Milano (Note: Only to and from Bologna); Milan Linate Airport	0.0 km (0 mi)	26.4 km (16.4 mi)	MI	--
Sesto San Giovanni Sud - Cologno Monzese (Note: Towards Rho entry only) (Note: For the exit, use junction 11 of the Autostrada A51, functionally connected to this in ordinary traffic; this junction is in fact indicated for traffic coming from the north and for traffic heading in the north direction of the Autostrada A51.)	1.0 km (0.62 mi)	25.4 km (15.8 mi)	MI	--
Sesto San Giovanni; MM1 Sesto Marelli-Sesto 1º Maggio	3.2 km (2.0 mi)	23.2 km (14.4 mi)	MI	--
Toll gate Sesto San Giovanni	3.7 km (2.3 mi)	22.8 km (14.2 mi)	MI	--
Autostrada Torino - Venezia; Milan Bergamo Airport	4.3 km (2.7 mi)	22.2 km (13.8 mi)	MB	--
Monza Sant'Alessandro	4.6 km (2.9 mi)	21.9 km (13.6 mi)	MB	--
Monza; MM1 Sesto 1º Maggio	5.3 km (3.3 mi)	21.2 km (13.2 mi)	MB	--
Cinisello Balsamo Robecco (Note: Only exit towards Bologna, only entrance towards Rho)	5.8 km (3.6 mi)	20.7 km (12.9 mi)	MB	--
Monza Villa Reale del Lago di Como e dello Spluga (Note: Entry only towards Bologna); Royal Villa of Monza	6.5 km (4.0 mi)	20.0 km (12.4 mi)	MI	--
Cinisello Balsamo sud Milan viale Zara	6.6 km (4.1 mi)	19.9 km (12.4 mi)	MI	--
Cinisello Balsamo Nord - Muggiò	8.5 km (5.3 mi)	18.0 km (11.2 mi)	MI	--
Nova Milanese	9.5 km (5.9 mi)	17.0 km (10.6 mi)	MB	--
Rest area "Cinisello Balsamo Nord"	10.5 km (6.5 mi)	16.0 km (9.9 mi)	MI	--
Vecchia Valassina - Erba	11.5 km (7.1 mi)	15.0 km (9.3 mi)	MI	--
Strada statale 35 dei Giovi	13.0 km (8.1 mi)	13.5 km (8.4 mi)	MI	--
Cormano-Bollate	16.0 km (9.9 mi)	10.5 km (6.5 mi)	MI	--
Bollate-Novate	19.9 km (12.4 mi)	6.6 km (4.1 mi)	MI	--
Baranzate	20.9 km (13.0 mi)	4.8 km (3.0 mi)	MI	--
Autostrada Milan - Varese; Milan Malpensa Airport	21.5 km (13.4 mi)	4.3 km (2.7 mi)	MI	--
Mazzo di Rho - Expo Cascina Triulza	21.8 km (13.5 mi)	4.0 km (2.5 mi)	MI	--
Autostrada Torino - Venezia (Note: Only exit towards Monza, only entrance towards Rho); Pero - Fiera Milano est	22.7 km (14.1 mi)	3.1 km (1.9 mi)	MI	--
Fieramilano ovest	24.1 km (15.0 mi)	1.7 km (1.1 mi)	MI	--
Tangenziale Ovest di Milano	25.4 km (15.8 mi)	0.4 km (0.25 mi)	MI	--
Rho del Sempione	26.4 km (16.4 mi)	0.0 km (0 mi)	MI	--

== See also ==
- Autostrade of Italy
- Roads in Italy
- Transport in Italy

=== Other Italian roads ===
- State highways (Italy)
- Regional road (Italy)
- Provincial road (Italy)
- Municipal road (Italy)
