= Autostrada A50 =

Controlled-access highway in Italy

Autostrada A50
- Tangenziale Ovest di Milano; Milan west ring road

Route information
- Part of E35 and E62
- Maintained by Milano Serravalle - Milano Tangenziali
- Length: 31.8 km (19.8 mi)
- Existed: 1968–present

Major junctions
- Beltway around Milan
- North end: Rho
- A8 in Rho; A4 in Rho; A7 in Rozzano; A1 in San Giuliano Milanese
- South end: San Giuliano Milanese

Location
- Country: Italy
- Regions: Lombardy

Highway system
- Roads in Italy; Autostrade; State; Regional; Provincial; Municipal
← A 36	→ A 51

Map of Milan's ring roads with theAutostrada A50 highlighted

Autostrada A50 or Tangenziale Ovest di Milano ("Milan west ring road") is an autostrada (Italian for "motorway") 31.8 kilometres (19.8 mi) long in Italy located in the region of Lombardy that connects the suburban area of Milan from south-east to north-west, managed by Milano Serravalle – Milano Tangenziali. It is a part of the E35 and E62 European routes.

Together with the Autostrada A51 (Milan east ring road), the Autostrada A58 (Milan external east ring road) and the Autostrada A52 (Milan north ring road), it is the largest system of ring roads around a city in Italy, for a total length greater than 100 kilometres (62 mi).

By adding the urban sections of Autostrada A1 and Autostrada A4, which runs parallel to the northern ring road by connecting Autostrada A51 and Autostrada A50, to the three ring roads, a system of urban motorways is obtained that totally surrounds the city. The traffic flow that affects this stretch of motorway is around 250,000 daily transits.

== Route ==
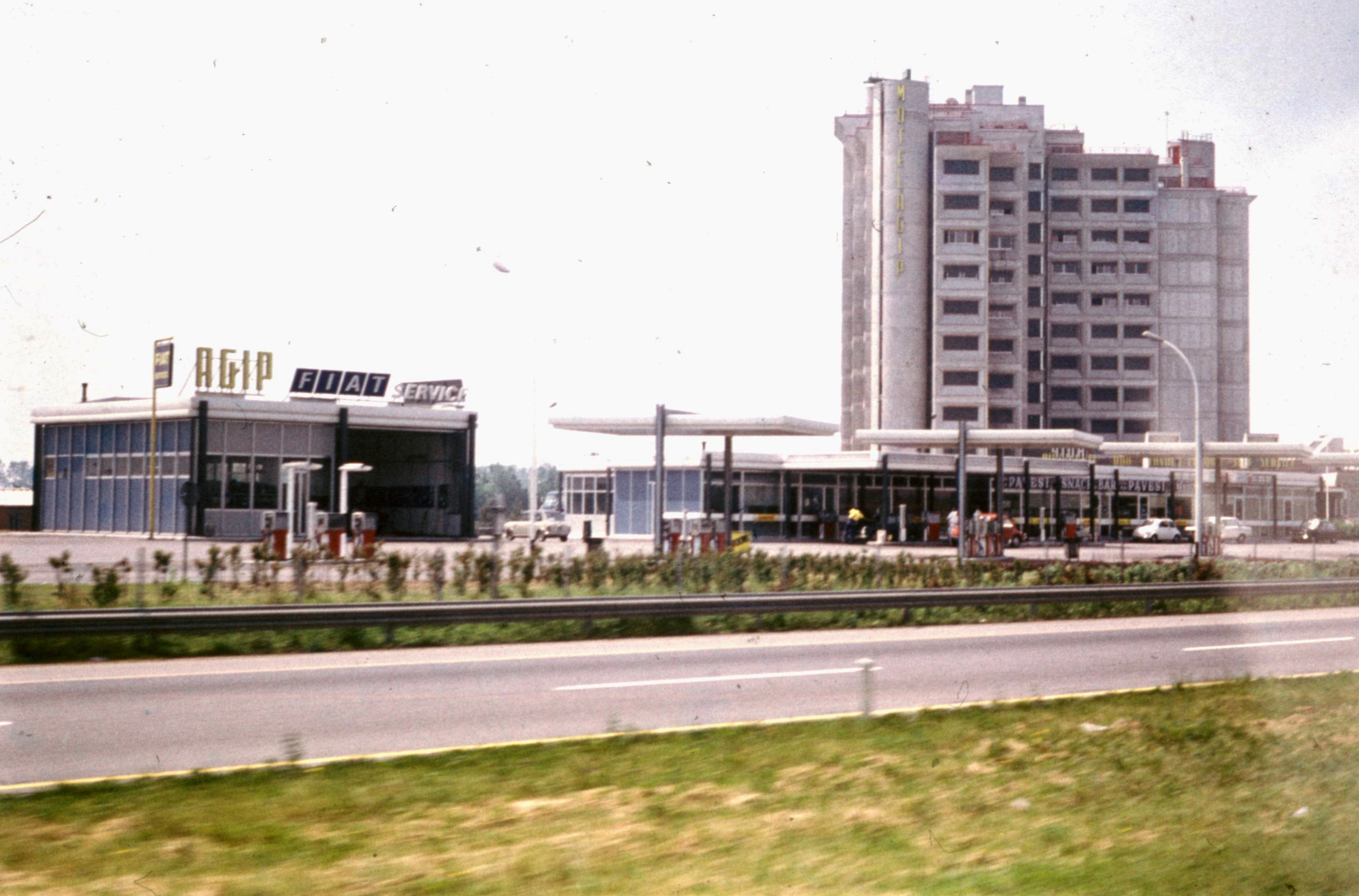
Rest area "Assago ovest"

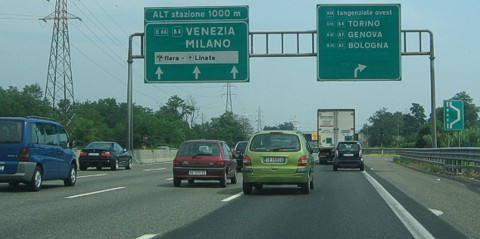
Interchange between Autostrada A50 and Autostrada A8

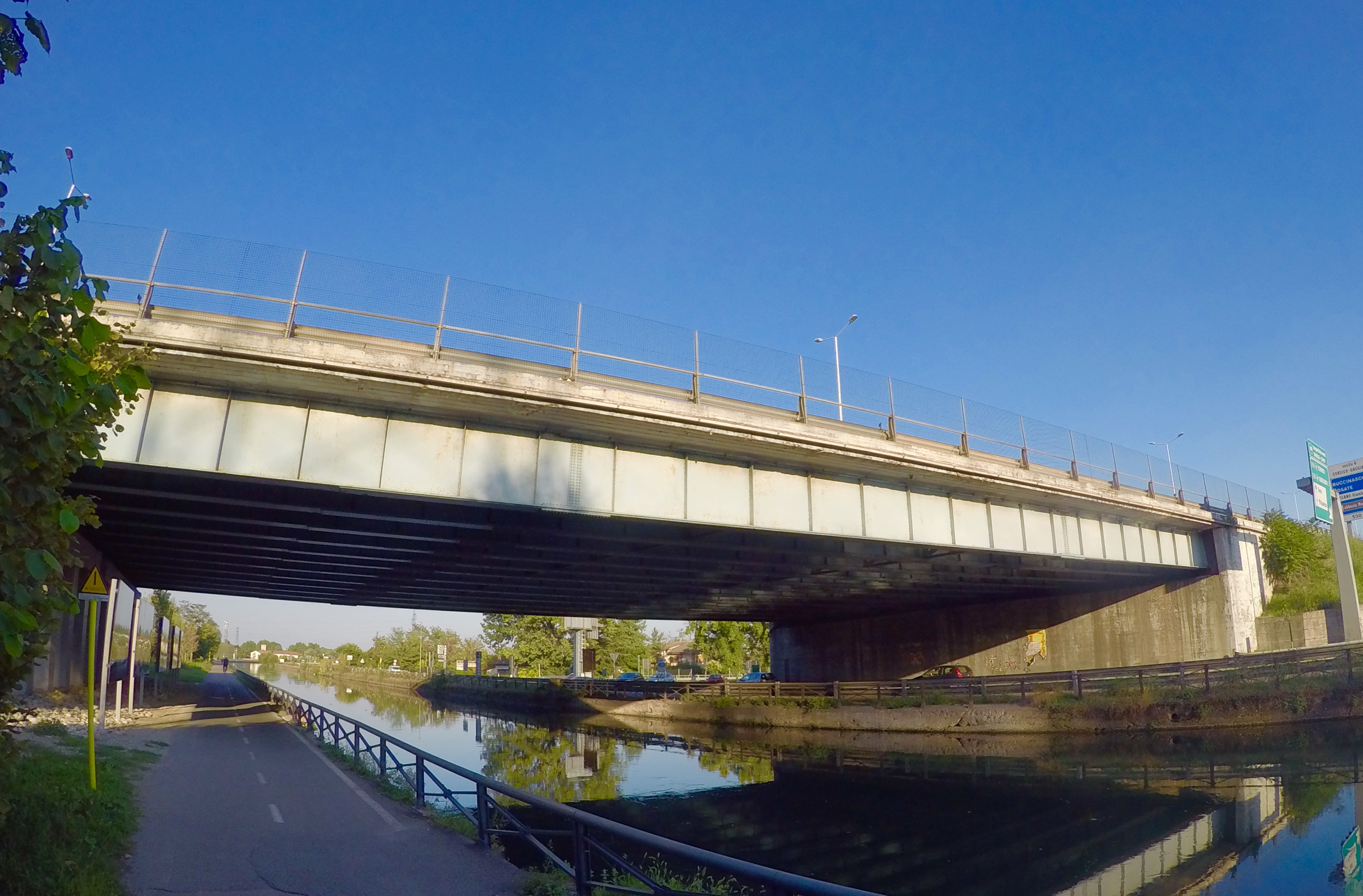
Autostrada A50 bridge over the Naviglio Grande

TANGENZIALE OVEST DI MILANO; Autostrada A50
Exit	↓km↓	↑km↑	Province	European Route
Varese; Milan Malpensa Airport	0.0 km (0 mi)	31.8 km (19.8 mi)	MI	E35; E62
Toll gate Terrazzano	0.8 km (0.50 mi)	31.0 km (19.3 mi)	MI	E35; E62
Rest area "Rho Ovest"	1.2 km (0.75 mi)	30.6 km (19.0 mi)	MI	E35; E62
del Sempione; Tangenziale Nord - Pero - Fiera Milano; MM1 Rho Fieramilano	2.5 km (1.6 mi)	29.3 km (18.2 mi)	MI	E35; E62
Torino - Trieste; Milan Bergamo Airport	4.0 km (2.5 mi)	27.8 km (17.3 mi)	MI	E35; E62
Rho Cascina Ghisolfa (Note: Exit only direction Genoa-Bologna.)	5.0 km (3.1 mi)	--	MI	E35; E62
Padana Superiore; Milano Gallaratese; MM1 Molino Dorino	6.0 km (3.7 mi)	25.8 km (16.0 mi)	MI	E35; E62
Settimo Milanese; Milano San Siro; San Siro Stadium; Fiera Milanocity	7.0 km (4.3 mi)	24.8 km (15.4 mi)	MI	E35; E62
Cusago; Milano Baggio; MM1 Bisceglie	10.5 km (6.5 mi)	21.3 km (13.2 mi)	MI	E35; E62
Rest area "Muggiano"	11.9 km (7.4 mi)	19.9 km (12.4 mi)	MI	E35; E62
Nuova Vigevanese; Milano Lorenteggio; Abbiategrasso - Vigevano - Cesano Boscone	14.0 km (8.7 mi)	17.8 km (11.1 mi)	MI	E35; E62
Corsico - Gaggiano; Trezzano sul Naviglio - Buccinasco	15.0 km (9.3 mi)	16.8 km (10.4 mi)	MI	E35; E62
Rest area "Assago ovest" (Note: U-turn via flyover.)	19.0 km (11.8 mi)	12.8 km (8.0 mi)	MI	E35; E62
Genova; Assago; MM2 Famagosta	20.0 km (12.4 mi)	11.8 km (7.3 mi)	MI	E35
dei Giovi; Pavia - Rozzano	21.0 km (13.0 mi)	10.8 km (6.7 mi)	MI	E35
Rozzano/Quinto de' Stampi; Milano Gratosoglio	23.8 km (14.8 mi)	8.0 km (5.0 mi)	MI	E35
Rest area "Rozzano est"	24.5 km (15.2 mi)	7.3 km (4.5 mi)	MI	E35
della Val Tidone; Opera - Locate Triulzi	26.0 km (16.2 mi)	5.8 km (3.6 mi)	MI	E35
Rest area "San Giuliano"	29.4 km (18.3 mi)	2.4 km (1.5 mi)	MI	E35
Bologna; Tangenziale Est; Milan Linate Airport	31.8 km (19.8 mi)	0.0 km (0 mi)	MI	E35

== See also ==
- Autostrade of Italy
- Roads in Italy
- Transport in Italy

=== Other Italian roads ===
- State highways (Italy)
- Regional road (Italy)
- Provincial road (Italy)
- Municipal road (Italy)
