= Valentino Giambelli =

Italian footballer and businessman (1928–2019)

Personal information
- Date of birth: 8 March 1928
- Place of birth: Agrate Brianza, Italy
- Date of death: 27 March 2019 (aged 91)
- Place of death: Agrate Brianza, Italy
- Position: Midfielder

Youth career
- A.C. Pro Sesto

Senior career*
Years	Team	Apps	(Gls)
1948–1949	Olginatese		
1949–1950	Società Sportiva Pro Lissone		
1950–1955	Monza		
1955–1957	Gallaratese		
- Total
- * Club domestic league appearances and goals

Valentino Giambelli (8 March 1928 – 27 March 2019) was an Italian footballer and businessman, chairman of A.C. Monza Brianza 1912 from 1980 to 2000.

== Football Life ==
During the Second World War, Giambelli worked as a laborer at the Magneti Marelli of Sesto San Giovanni, and work breaks, playing football in the field company, to be noticed by some scout of the A.C. Pro Sesto.

After the war, and after the junior teams, played for a year in Olginatese (the Olginate team), just outside Lecco. In 1949, went to Pro Lissone, and then finish in Monza Soccer team with whom he won the championship of the C series coming to Serie B.

Giambelli remained 5 years in Monza, but at the age of 27 years decided to discontinue football career and to use the degree of surveyor dedicated to the construction.
