= Variante di Valico =

Motorway in central Italy

Variante di Valico (blue) and Autostrada A1 (green)

Variante di Valico (number A1 var) is a deviation of the Italian A1 motorway opened to traffic on 23 December 2015, between La Quercia and Aglio in central Italy. The entire project covers a length of 62.5 km, of which 37 km involved adding a third lane on each side of the existing A1 and 25 km the construction of the new section, most of which consists of viaducts and tunnels, the longest tunnel being 8.7 km in length. The new section runs parallel to the central part of the Bologna-Florence motorway A1. The earlier motorway remains open, providing an alternative route. The A1 splits up north of the Apennines, the two sections rejoining south of the mountains.

The twin-bore Sparvo Tunnel was completed in July 2013.

== Route ==
Variante di Valico
Type	Indication	↓km↓	↑km↑	Province	European route
	Milan - Napels "La Quercia" Interchange	0	32,9	BO	
	Badia	17,4	15,5	BO	
	Area servizio "Badia Nuova" ovest Posto neve "Badia Nuova" est	17,9	15	BO	
	Firenzuola; Mugello	27,9	5	FI	
	Milan - Napels	32,9	0	FI	
