= Liscate =

Liscate Liscaa (Lombard)
- Comune
- Comune di Liscate
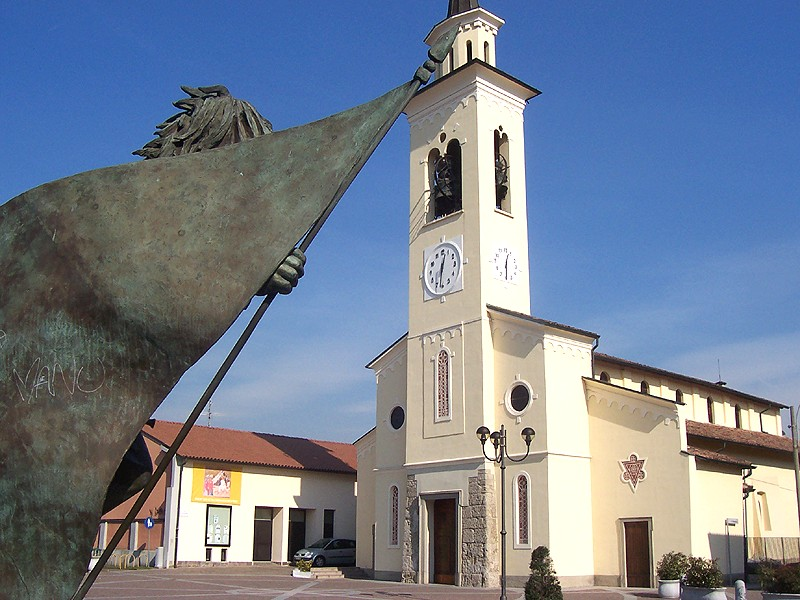

- Coat of arms

- Location within Italy Location within Lombardy
- Coordinates: 45°29′N 9°25′E
- Country: Italy
- Region: Lombardy
- Metropolitan city: Milan (MI)

Government
  - Mayor: Lorenzo Fucci

Area
  - Total: 9.3 km^{2} (3.6 sq mi)

Population (1 January 2009)
  - Total: 3,927
  - Density: 420/km^{2} (1,100/sq mi)
- Time zone: UTC+1 (CET)
  - Summer (DST): UTC+2 (CEST)
- Postal code: 20050
- Dialing code: 02
- Website: Official website

Liscate (Lombard: Liscaa [liˈskaː]) is a comune (municipality) in the Province of Milan in the Italian region Lombardy, located about 20 kilometres (12 mi) east of Milan.
