= Viale Enrico Forlanini =

Street in Milan, Italy

Coordinates: 45°27′44″N 9°15′16″E

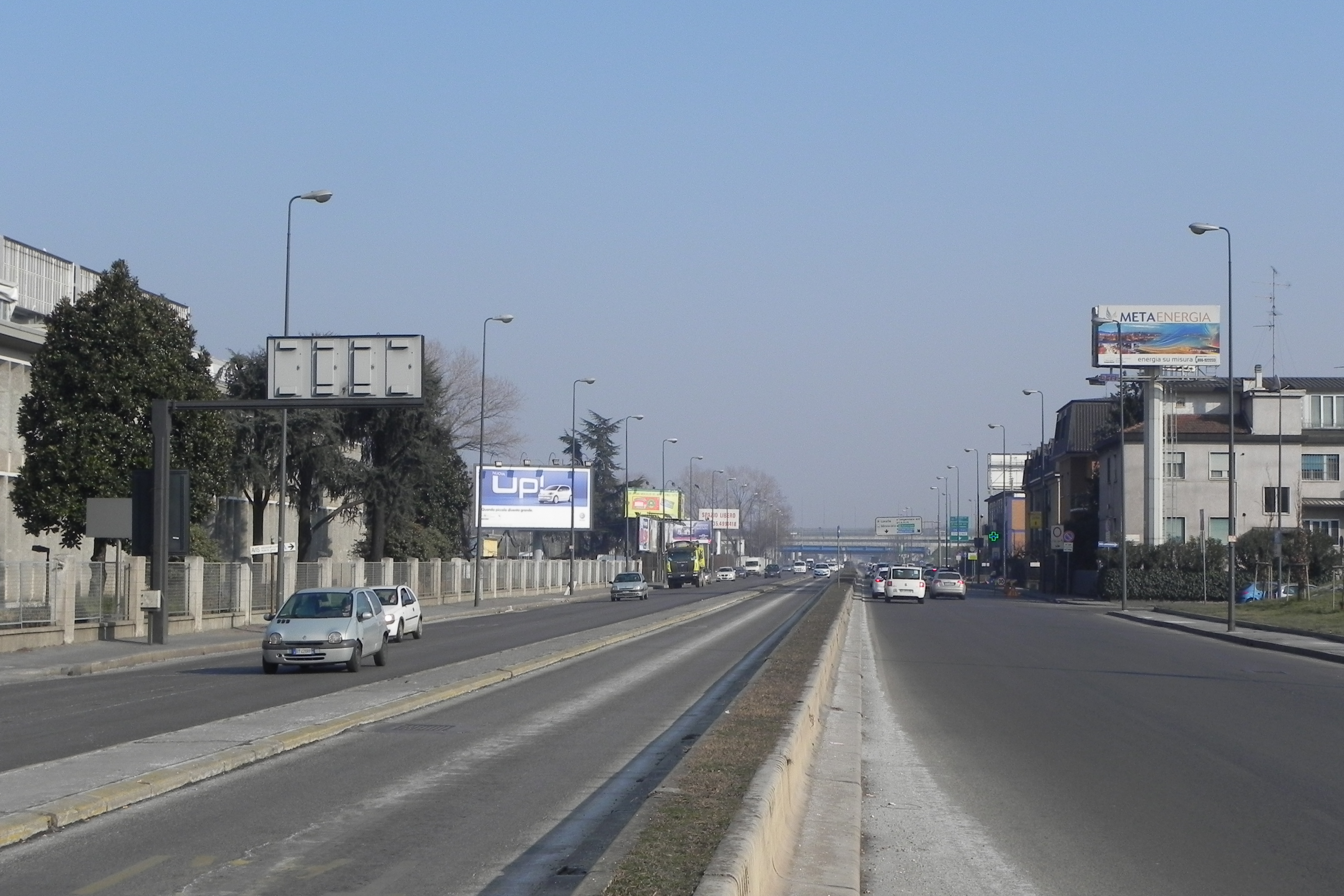
The street view from Cavriano in February 2012.

The Viale Enrico Forlanini is a long avenue located in Milan, Lombardy, Italy. It cuts through a park, connecting the city centre with Linate Airport and Idroscalo lake. The street is named after Milan-born aviation pioneer Enrico Forlanini (1848–1930). It was originally named after Michele Bianchi (1883–1930), a founding member of the National Fascist Party.
