= Agrate Brianza =

- Comune
- Comune di Agrate Brianza
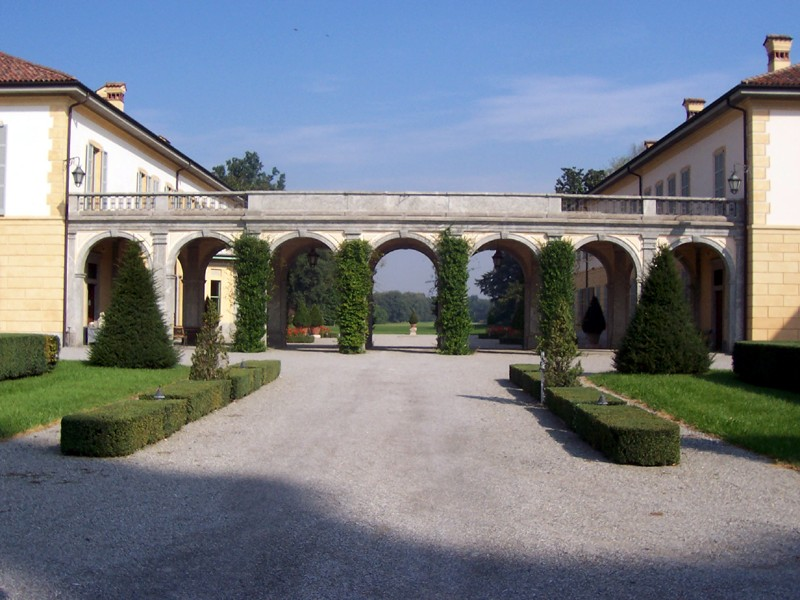
- Villa Trivulzio

- Coat of arms

- Location of Agrate Brianza in Italy Agrate Brianza (Lombardy)
- Coordinates: 45°35′N 9°21′E
- Country: Italy
- Region: Lombardy
- Province: Monza and Brianza (MB)
- Frazioni: Omate

Government
  - Mayor: Simone Sironi

Area
  - Total: 11.3 km^{2} (4.4 sq mi)
- Elevation: 158 m (518 ft)

Population (30 April 2009)
  - Total: 14,820
  - Density: 1,310/km^{2} (3,400/sq mi)
- Demonym: Agratesi
- Time zone: UTC+1 (CET)
  - Summer (DST): UTC+2 (CEST)
- Postal code: 20864
- Dialing code: 039
- Website: Official website

Agrate Brianza (Brianzöö: Agraa) is a comune (municipality) in the Province of Monza and Brianza in the Italian region Lombardy, located about 20 kilometres (12 mi) northeast of Milan.

== Notable people ==
- Clement Vismara (1897–1988), missionary
- Valentino Giambelli (1928), builder
- Mino Reitano (1944–2009), singer-songwriter
- Marco d'Agrate (1504–1574), sculptor

== Immigration ==
- Demographic Statistics

- Number of immigrants at 2009 (the first five for nationality)
  - Romania: 312
  - Albania: 206
  - Morocco: 197
  - Ecuador: 102
  - Egypt: 56

== Twin towns ==
- Česká Třebová, Czech Republic
