= Autostrada A1 (Italy) =

Controlled-access highway in Italy

Autostrada A1
- Autostrada del Sole; Sun motorway

Route information
- Part of E35 and E45
- Maintained by ANAS
- Length: 759.6 km (472.0 mi)
- Existed: 1964–present

Major junctions
- North end: Milan
- A50 and A51 in Milan; A21 in Piacenza; A15 in Parma; A22 in Modena; A13 and A14 in Bologna; A11 and RA 3 in Florence; RA 6 in Bettolle-Valdichiana; GRA in Fiano Romano; A24 and A90/GRA in Lunghezza; A90/GRA in San Cesareo; A30 in Caserta; A3 and A16 in Naples
- South end: Naples

Location
- Country: Italy
- Regions: Lombardy, Emilia-Romagna, Tuscany, Umbria, Lazio, Campania

Highway system
- Roads in Italy; Autostrade; State; Regional; Provincial; Municipal
← A 91	→ A 2

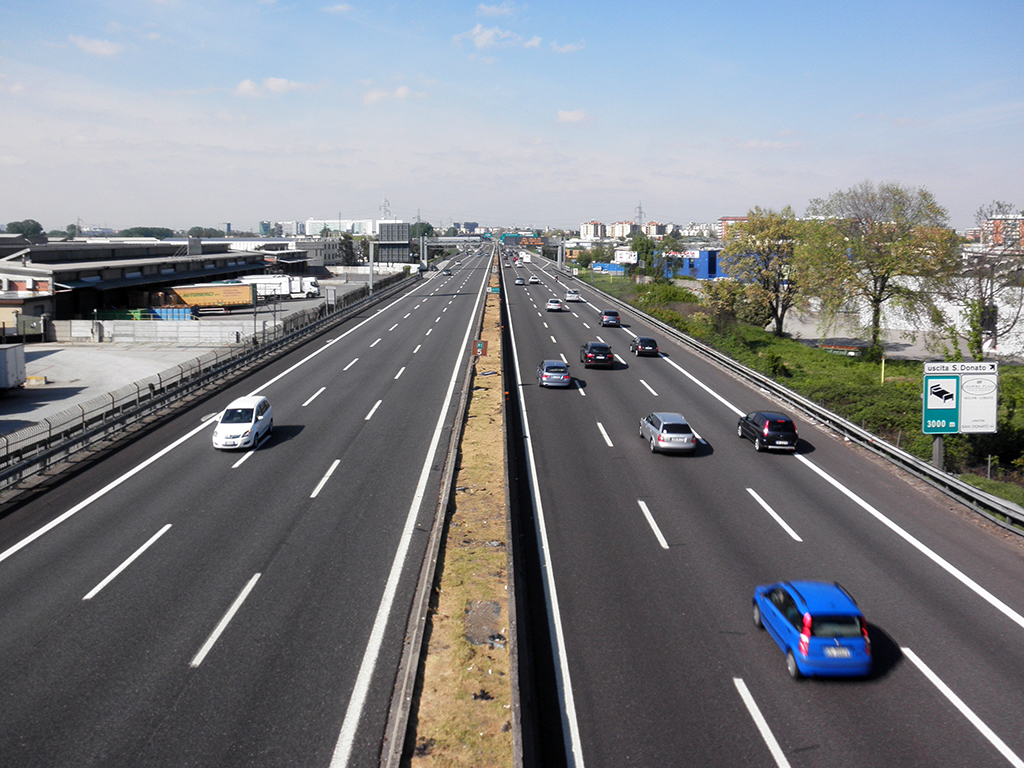
Autostrada A1 at San Giuliano Milanese

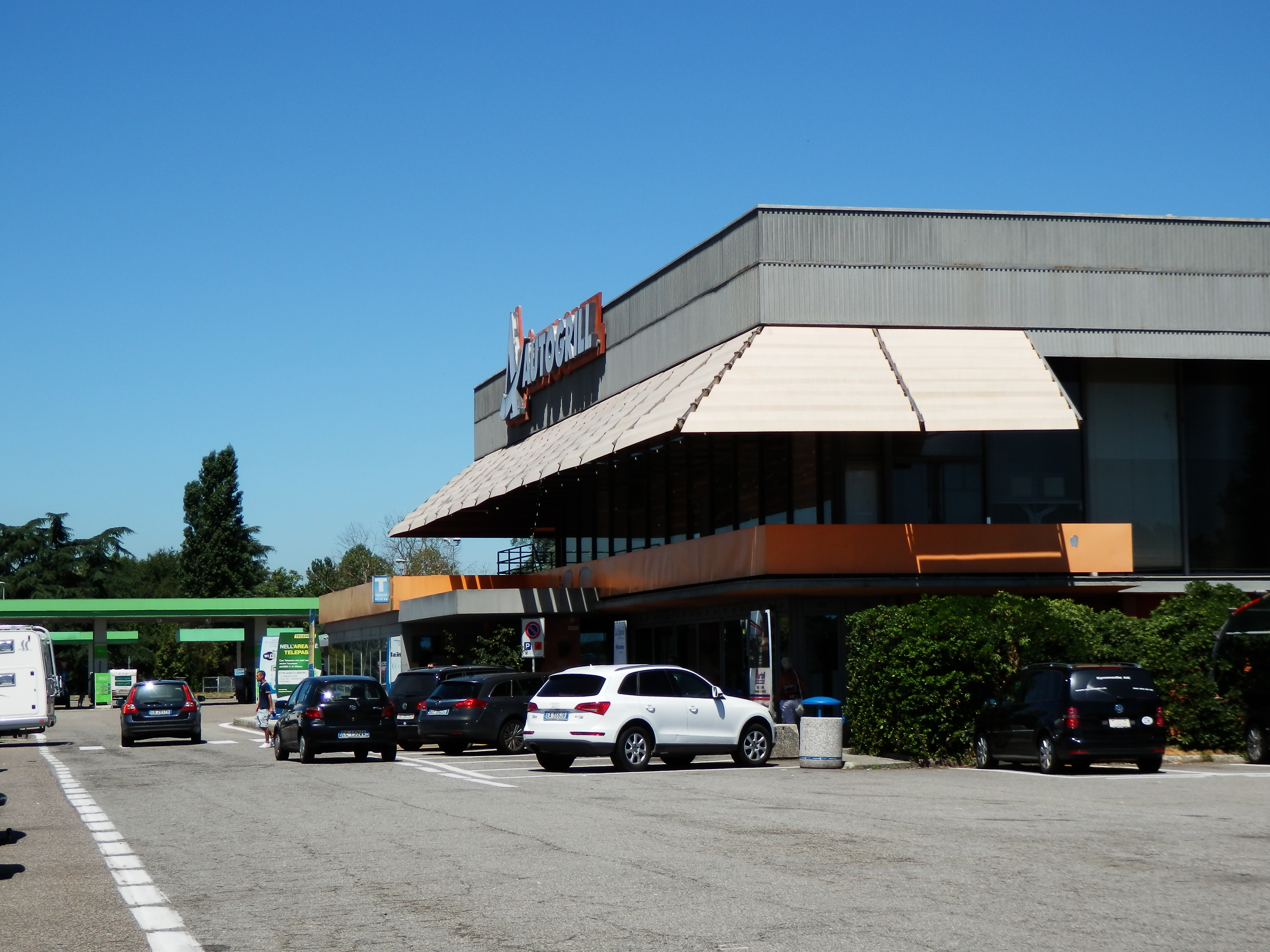
Rest area "San Zenone"

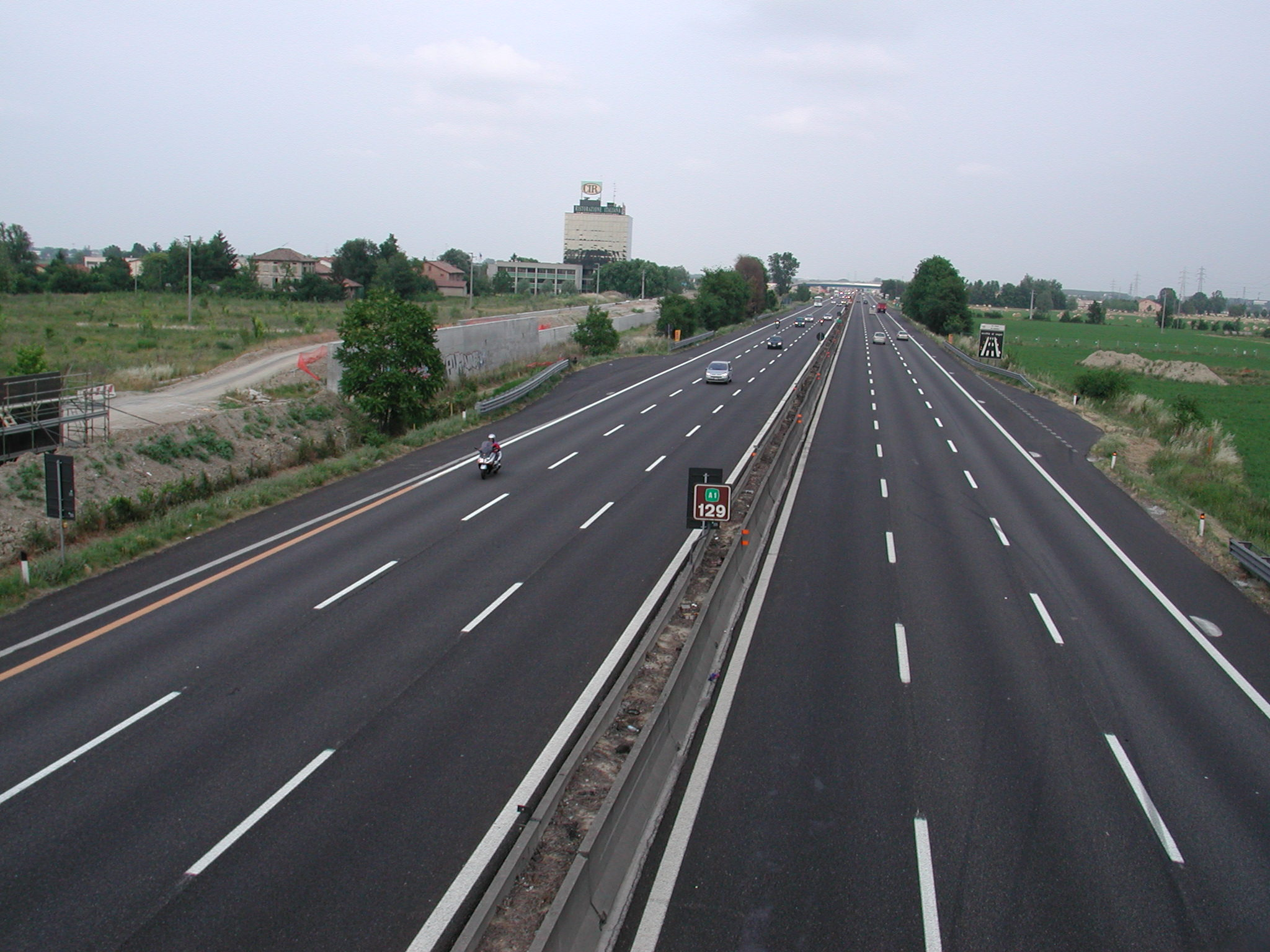
Autostrada A1 at Reggio Emilia

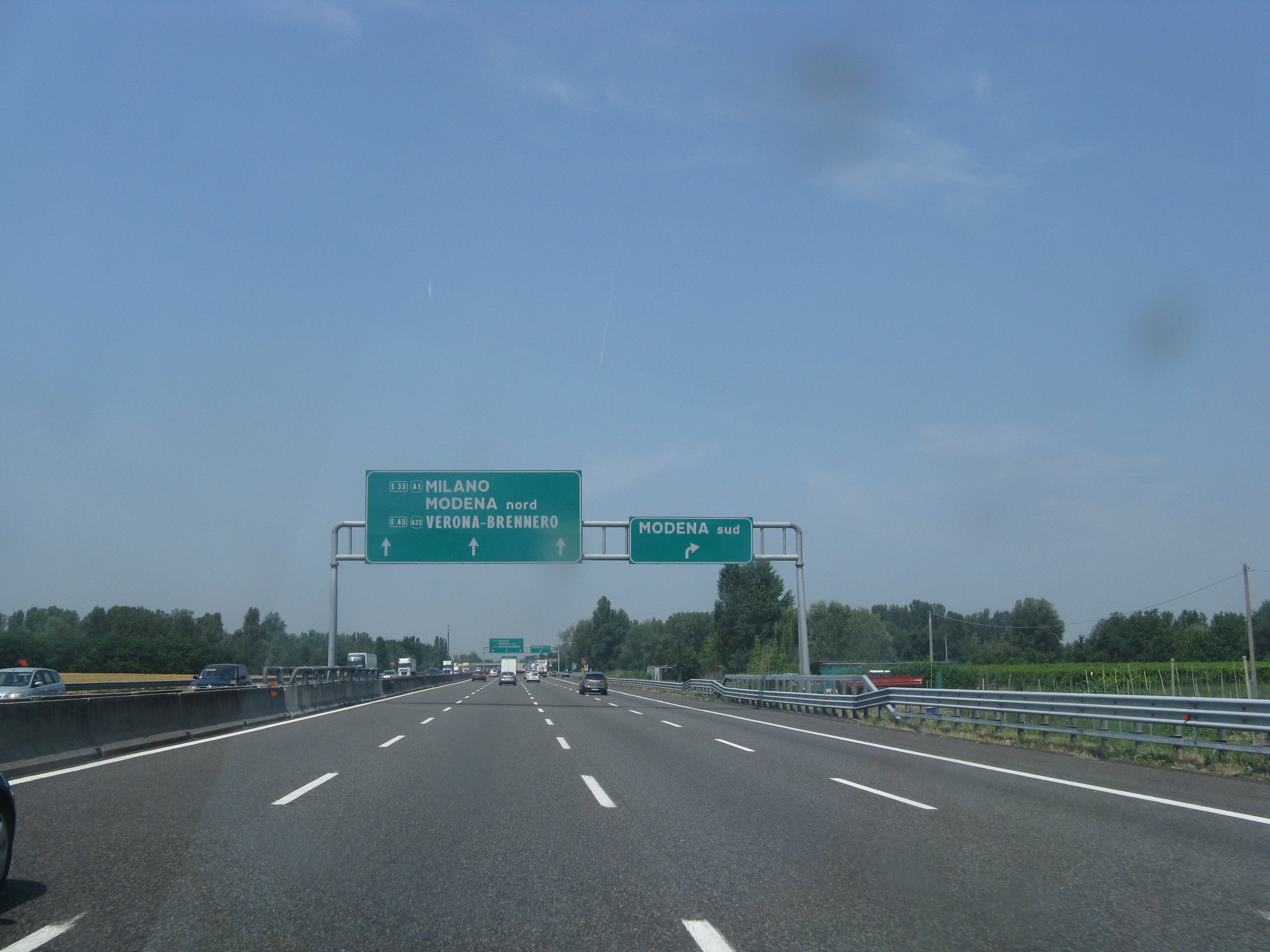
Autostrada A1 at Modena

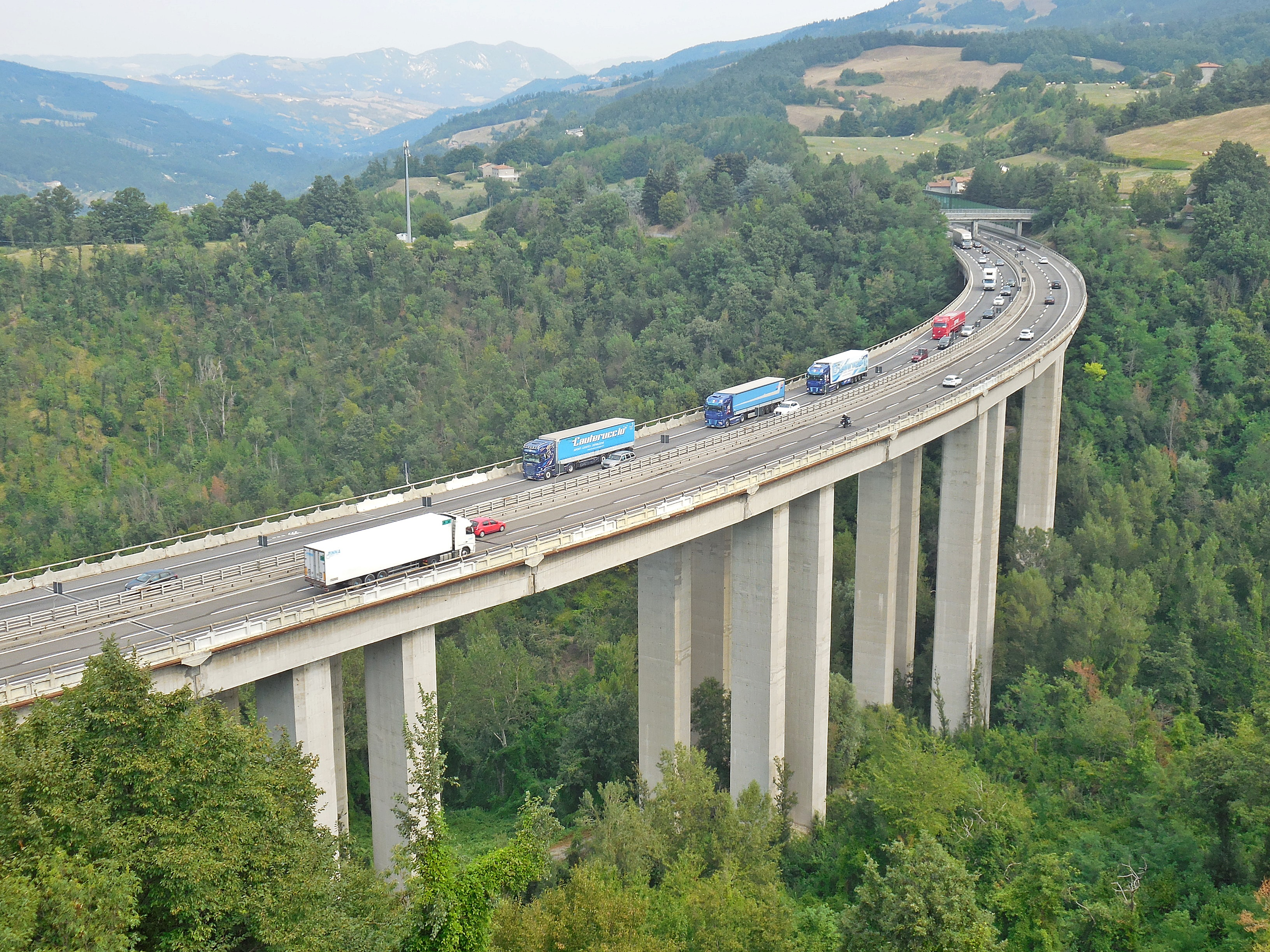
Rio Voglio viaduct near San Benedetto Val di Sambro

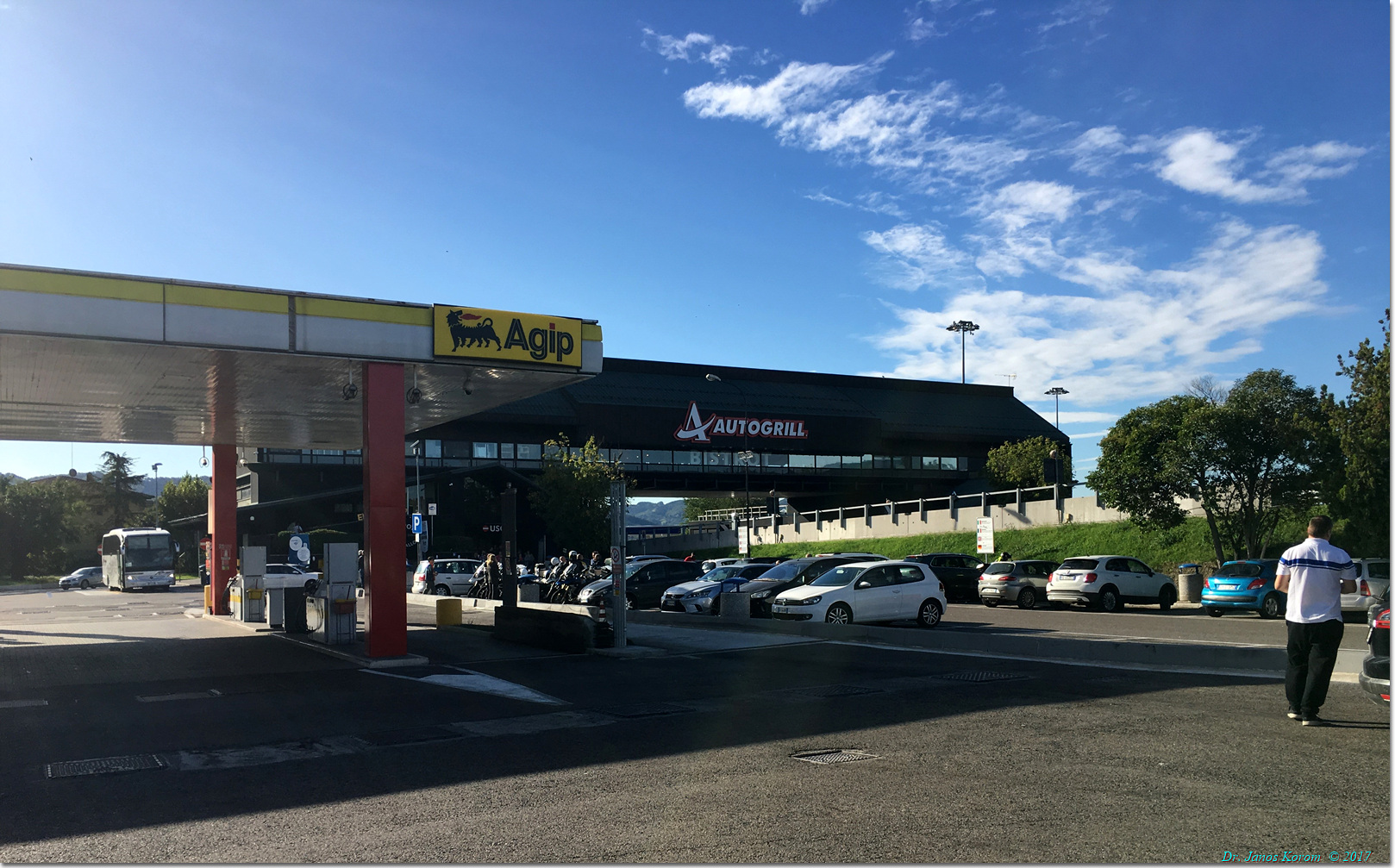
Rest area "Cantagallo"

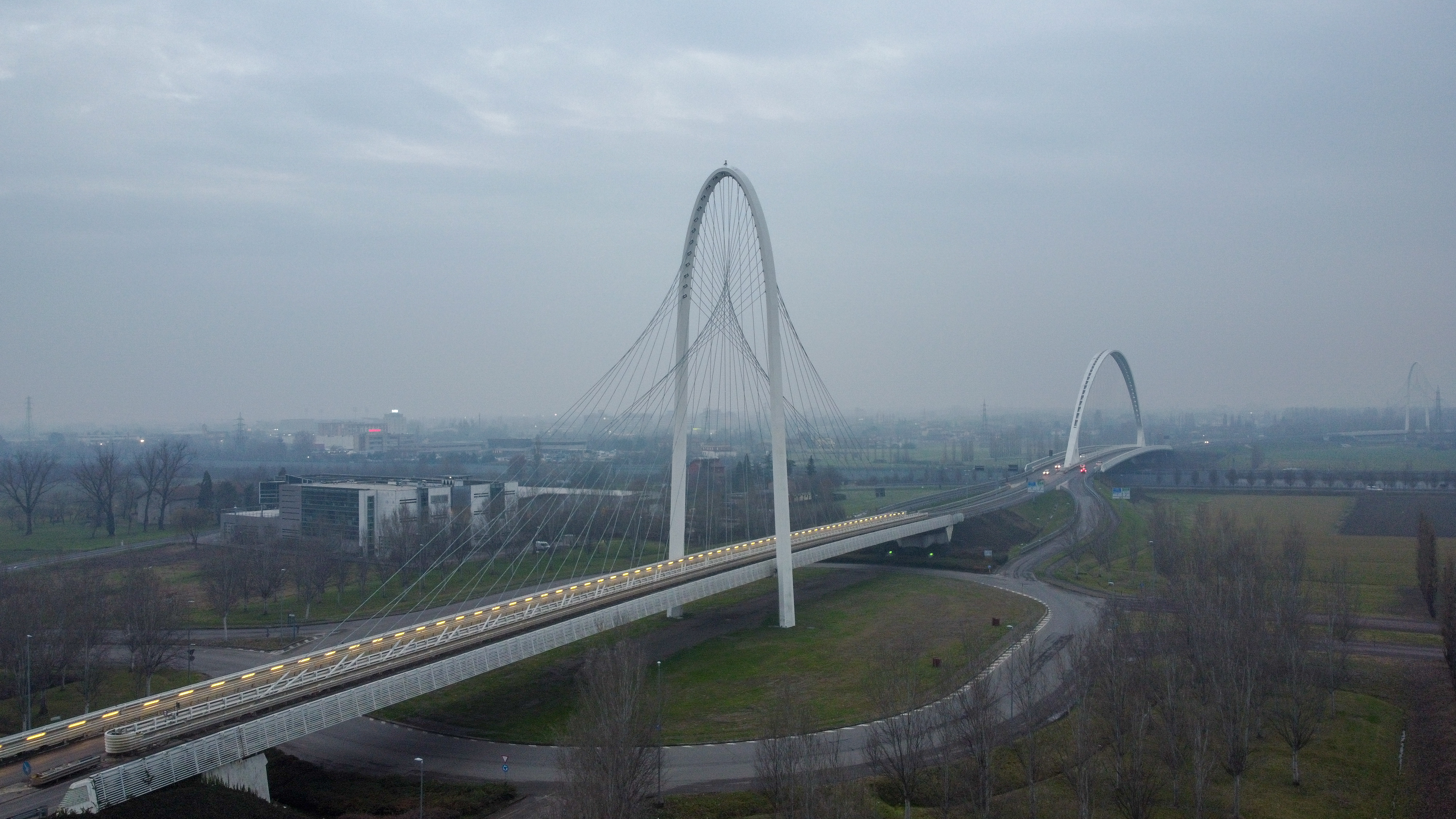
Calatrava viaduct near Reggio Emilia

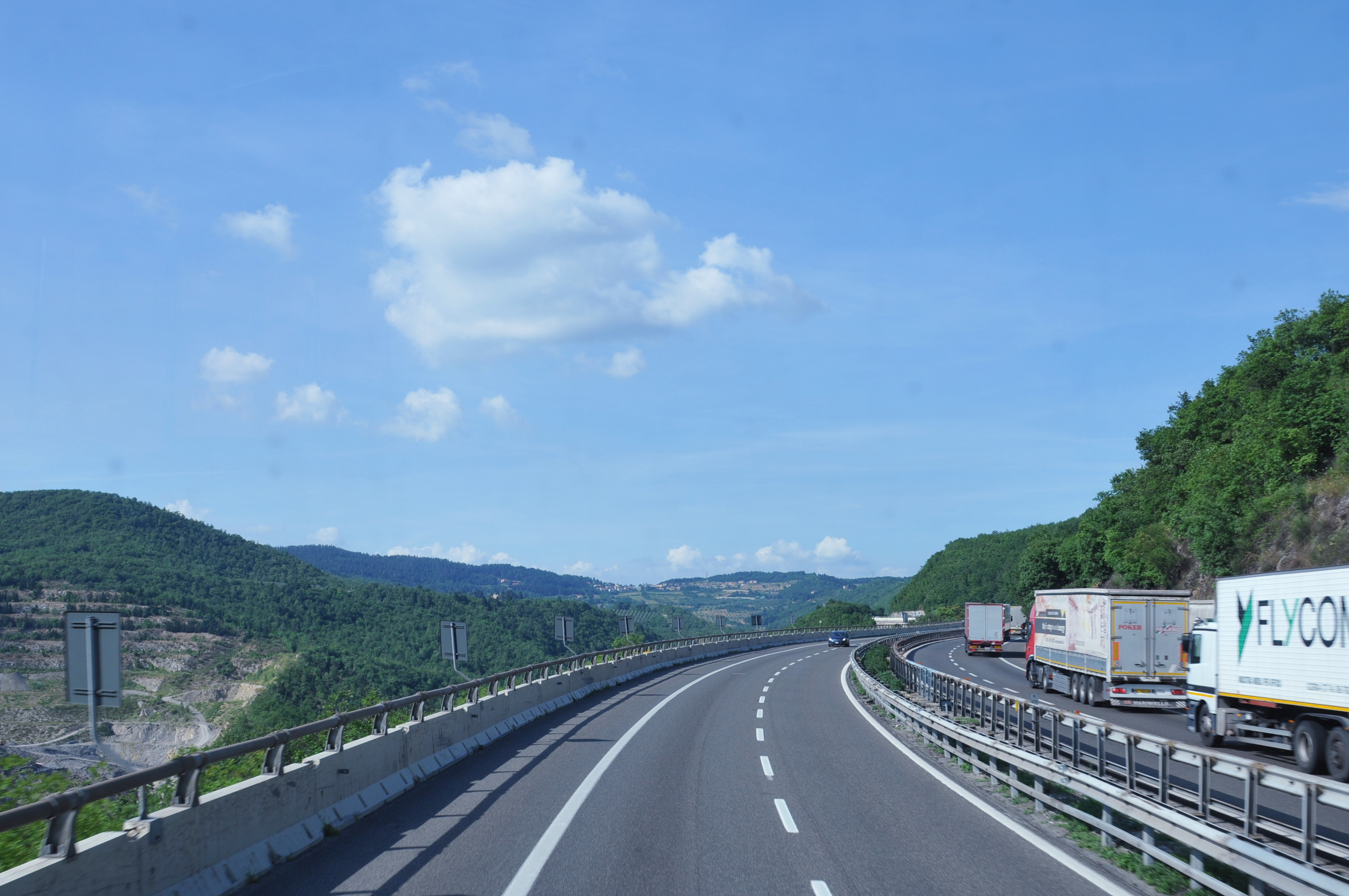
Autostrada A1 at Calenzano

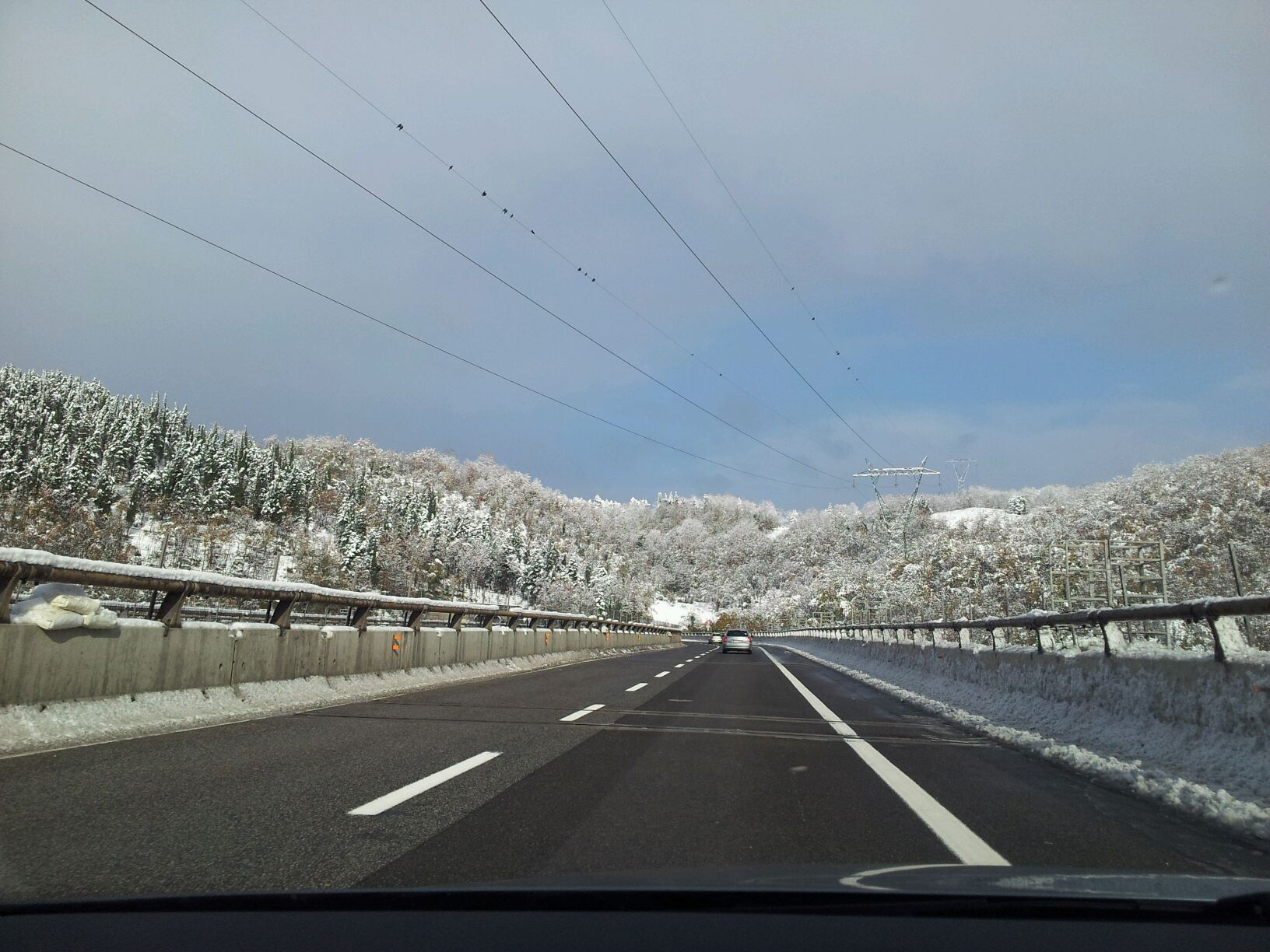
Autostrada A1 at Barberino di Mugello

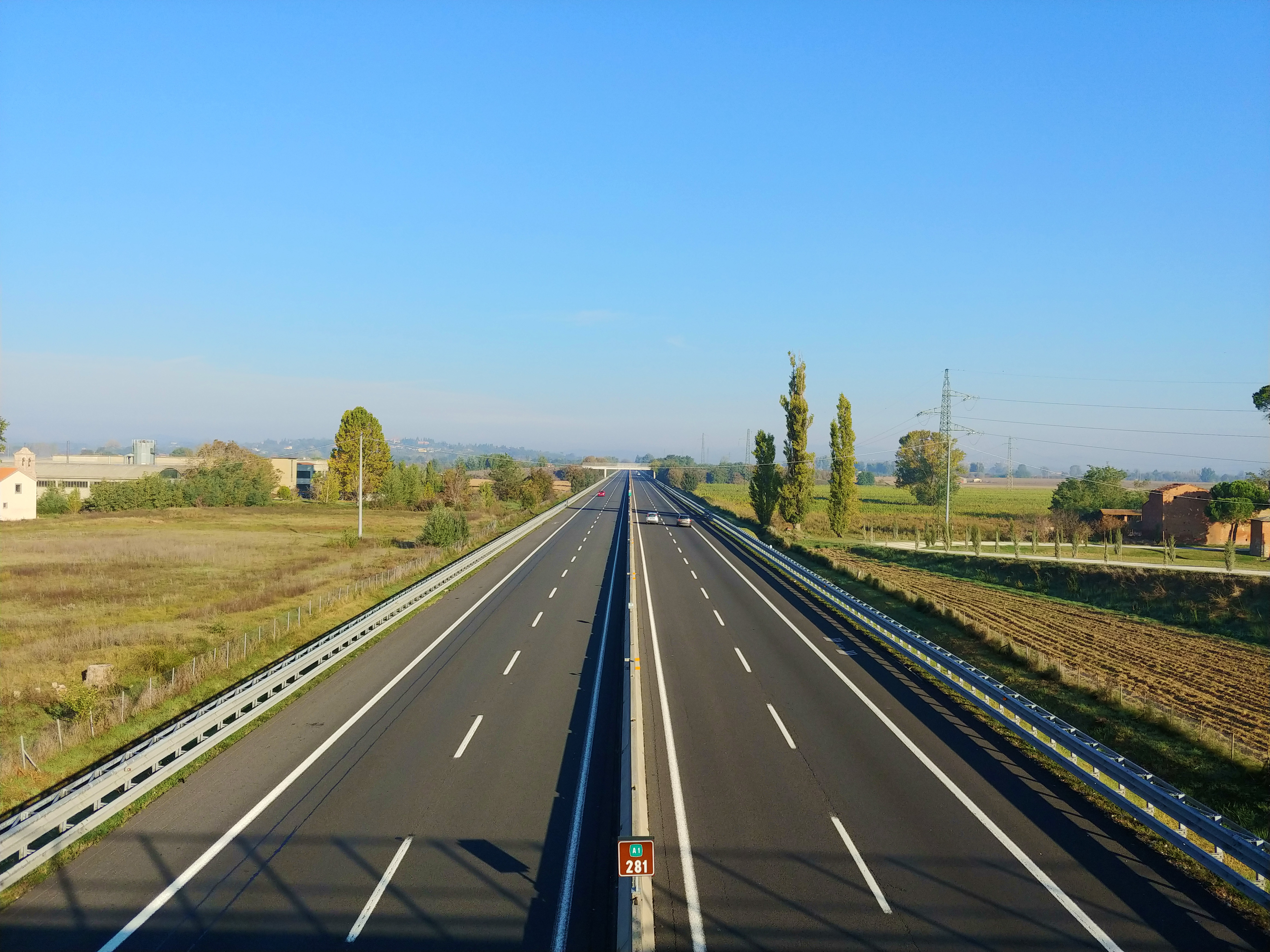
Autostrada A1 at Sinalunga

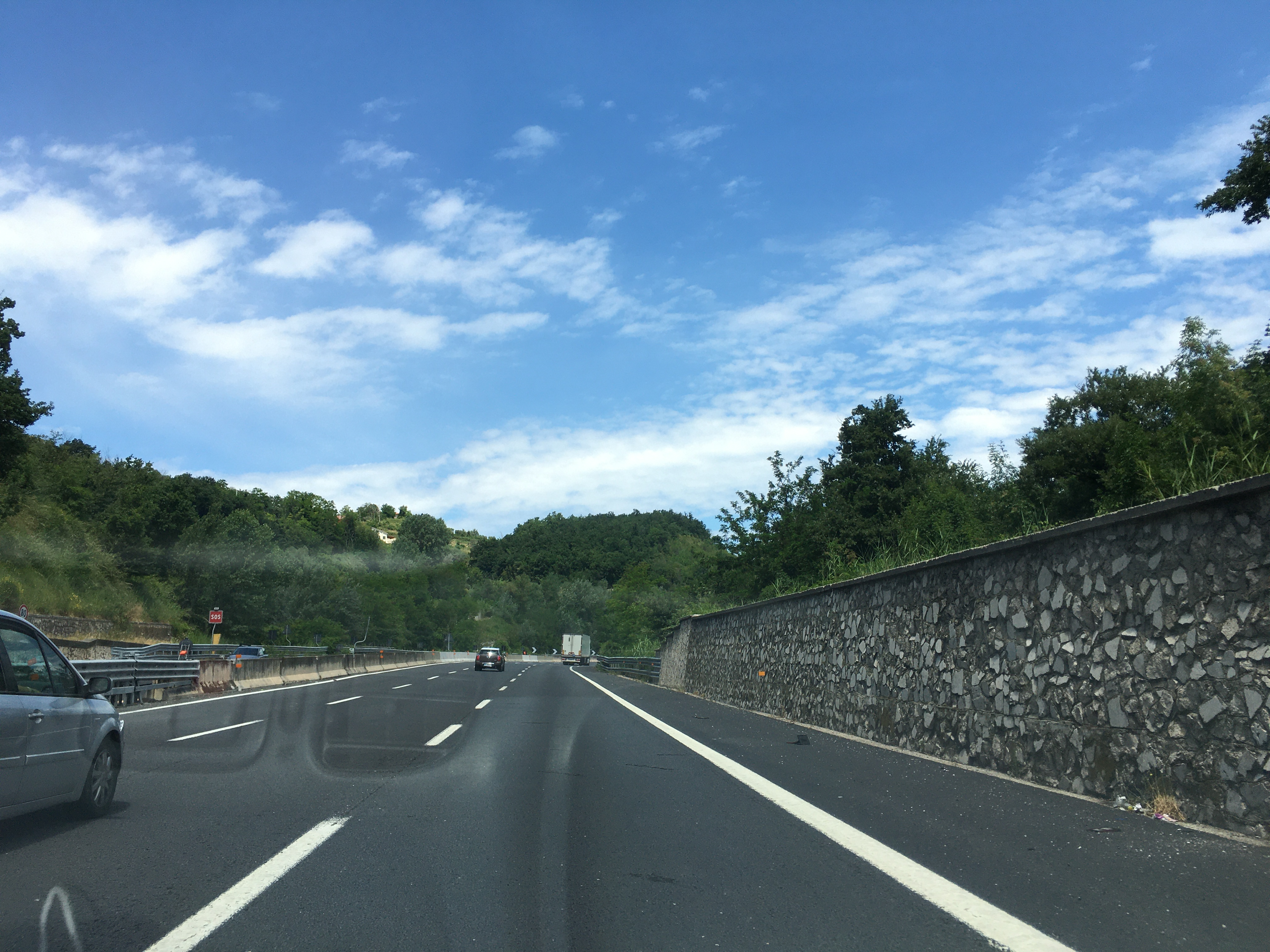
Autostrada A1 at Nazzano

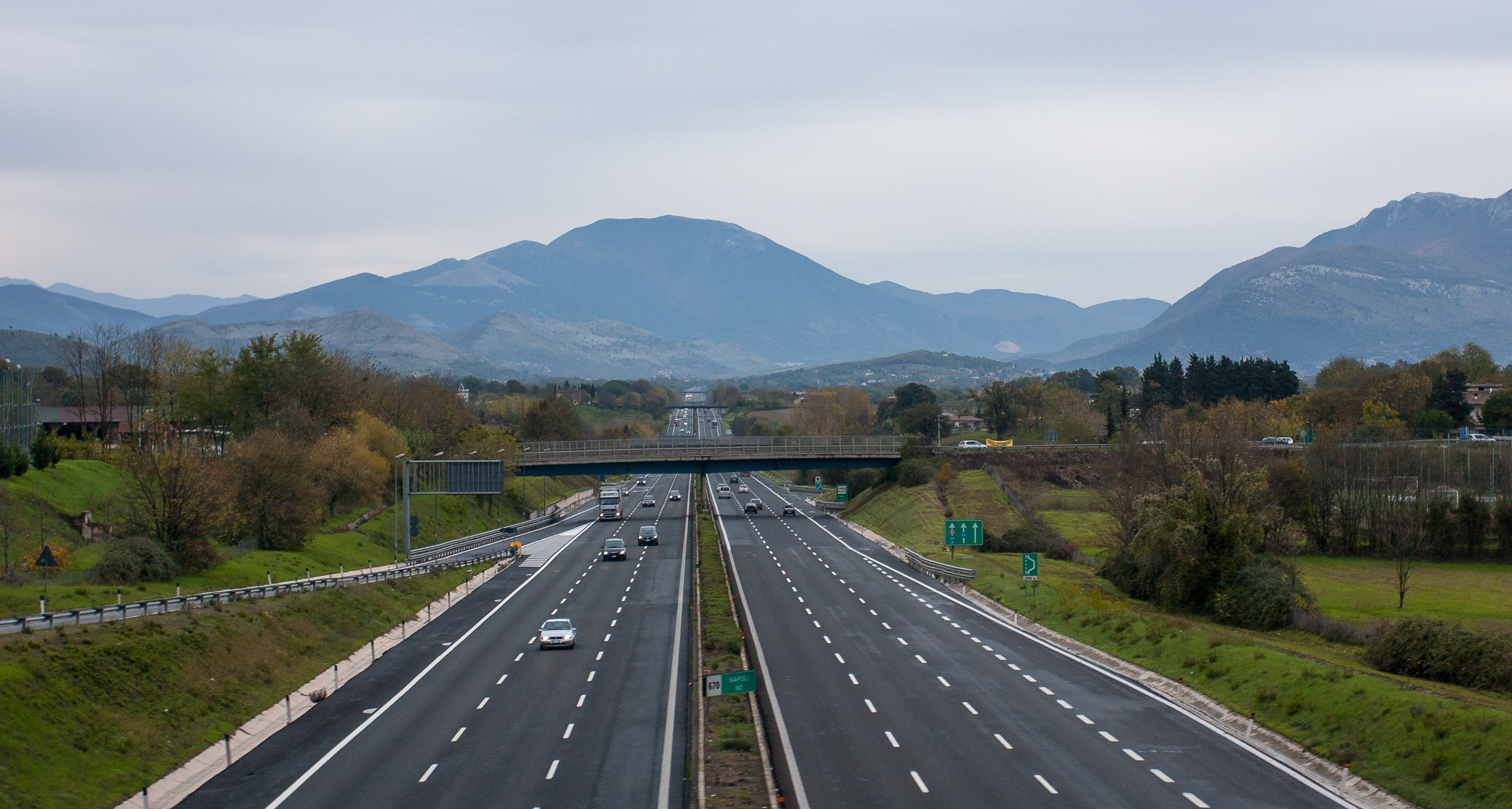
Autostrada A1 at Cassino

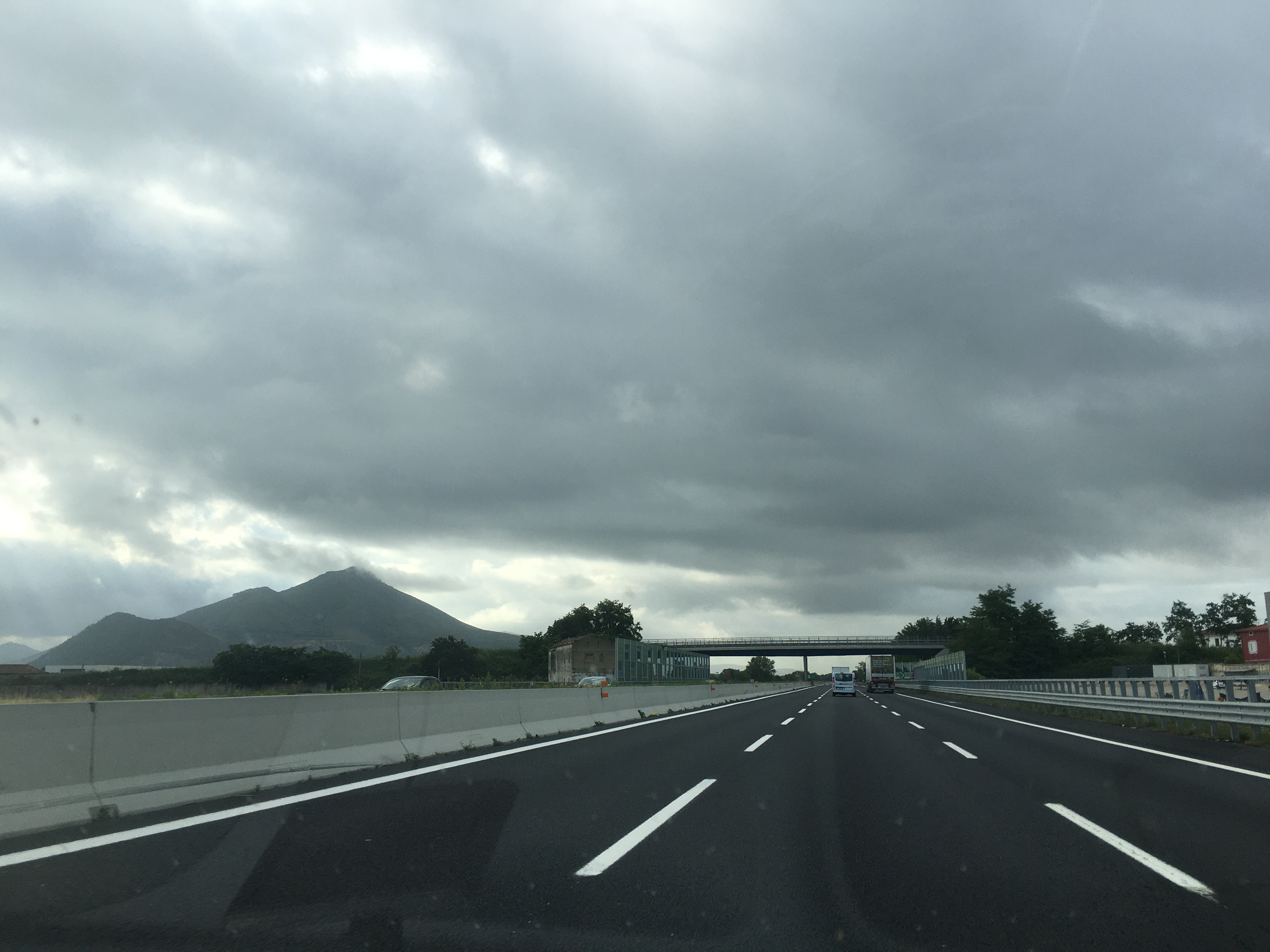
Autostrada A1 at Vitulazio

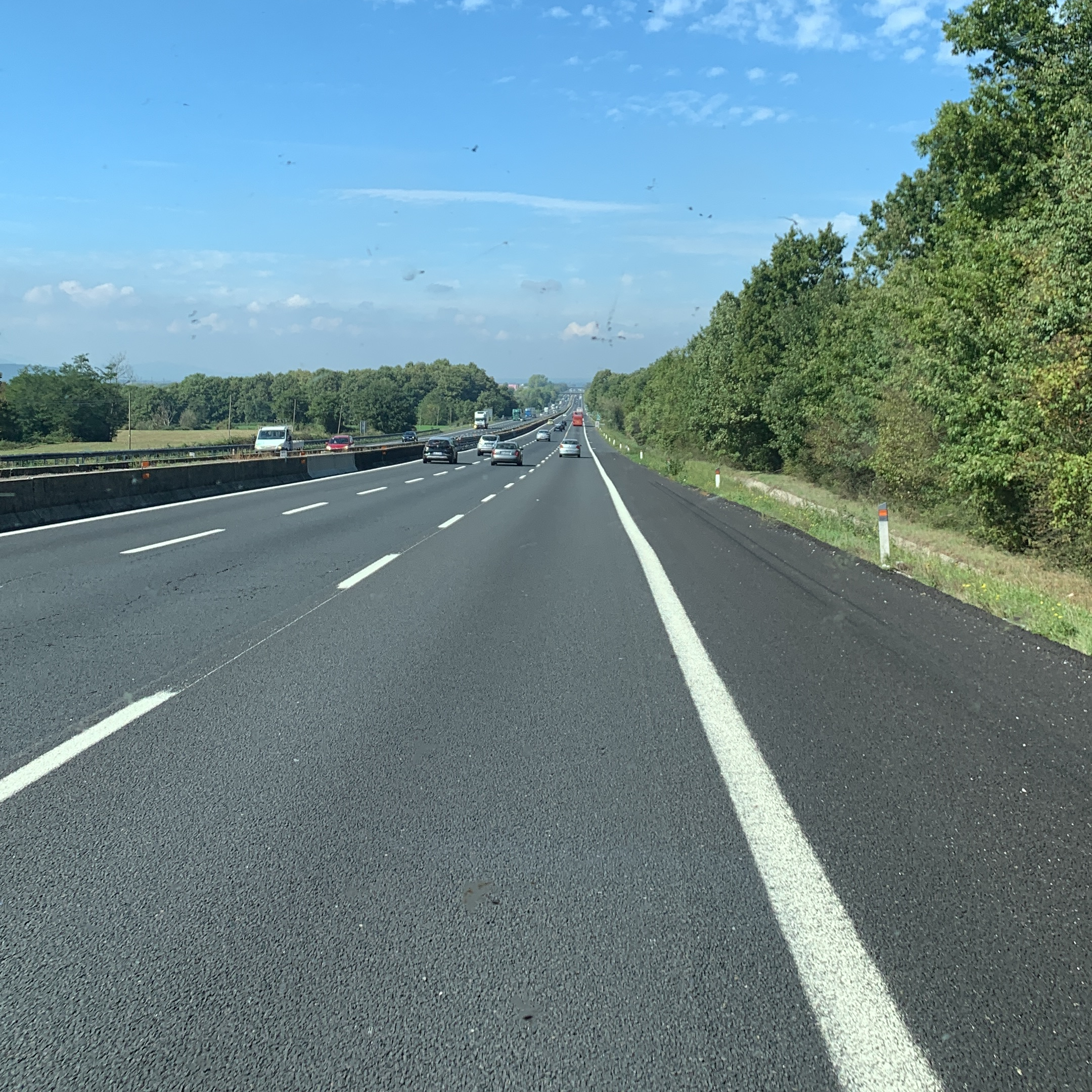
Autostrada A1 at Anagni

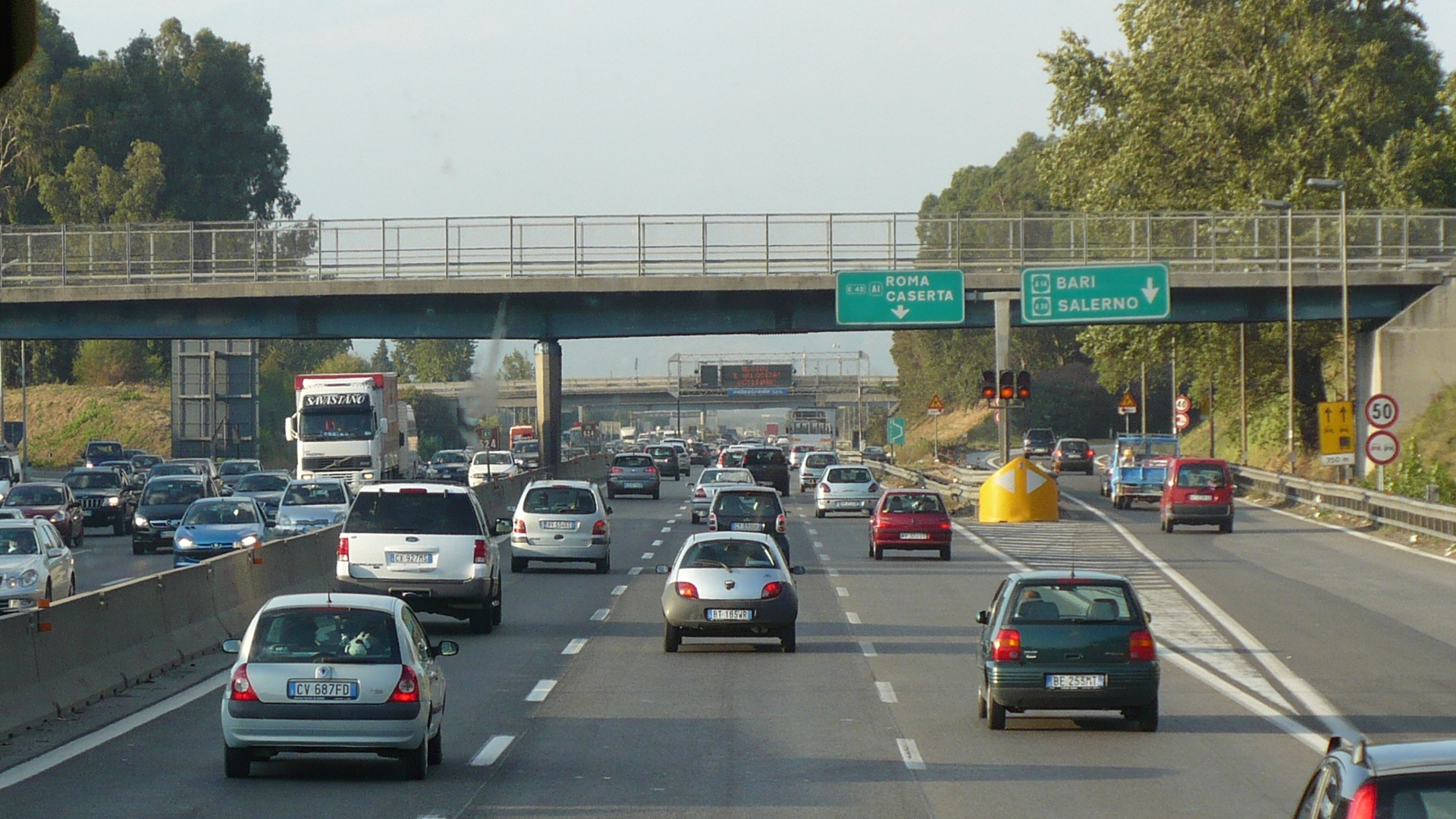
Autostrada A1 at Caserta

The Autostrada A1 or Autostrada del Sole ("Sun motorway") is the longest (760 kilometres (470 mi)) autostrada (Italian for "motorway") in Italy, linking some of the largest cities of the country: Milan, Bologna, Florence, Rome, and Naples. The Autostrada A1 is located in the regions of Lombardy, Emilia-Romagna, Tuscany, Umbria, Lazio, and Campania. It is a part of the E35 and E45 European routes.

== History ==
Throughout the 1950s and 1960s, successive administrations wanted this major infrastructure project to be completed as quickly as possible, as it would be a great boost for the national economy. Construction began in 1956, and the highway was opened to traffic by then-prime minister Aldo Moro on 4 October 1964.

The A1 reduced driving time between Milan and Naples from two days to just seven to eight hours. The section between Rome and Naples was originally designated A2, but it was incorporated into A1 following the opening of the bypass from Fiano Romano to San Cesareo on 21 July 1988.

== Route ==
Legend:

- I/C - Interchange, I/S - Intersection, RSA - Rest and service area, OBR - Overhead bridge restaurant, R/R - Restaurant and rest plaza, L/B - Layby, V/P - Vista point, TN - tunnel, T/P - Toll plaza, BR - Bridge

MILAN – NAPLES; Autostrada del Sole
Exit	↓km↓	↑km↑	Province	European Route
Raccordo Tangenziale est di Milano; Milan Linate Airport; Milan Bergamo Airport	0.0 km (0 mi)	759.6 km (472.0 mi)	MI	
Raccordo Piazzale Corvetto; San Donato Milanese	1.5 km (0.93 mi)	758.1 km (471.1 mi)	MI	
San Giuliano Milanese	2.8 km (1.7 mi)	756.8 km (470.3 mi)	MI	
Tangenziale Ovest; Milan Malpensa Airport	4.4 km (2.7 mi)	755.2 km (469.3 mi)	MI	E35
Melegnano road toll if going to Milan	8.7 km (5.4 mi)	750.2 km (466.2 mi)	MI	E35
Toll gate Milano Sud	8.9 km (5.5 mi)	749.7 km (465.8 mi)	MI	E35
Rest area "San Zenone"	15.1 km (9.4 mi)	745 km (463 mi)	MI	E35
Lodi	22.7 km (14.1 mi)	737 km (458 mi)	LO	E35
Casalpusterlengo	37.9 km (23.5 mi)	722 km (449 mi)	LO	E35
Rest area "Somaglia"	43.5 km (27.0 mi)	716 km (445 mi)	LO	E35
Basso Lodigiano	50.7 km (31.5 mi)	710 km (440 mi)	LO	E35
Turin – Brescia	56.4 km (35.0 mi)	704.3 km (437.6 mi)	PC	E35
Piacenza Sud	58.1 km (36.1 mi)	703.2 km (436.9 mi)	PC	E35
Rest area "Arda"	74.3 km (46.2 mi)	687 km (427 mi)	PC	E35
Brescia; Fiorenzuola	75.0 km (46.6 mi)	687 km (427 mi)	PC	E35
Fidenza – Salsomaggiore Terme	91.4 km (56.8 mi)	670 km (420 mi)	PR	E35
La Spezia	103.0 km (64.0 mi)	658 km (409 mi)	PR	E35
Parma	110.4 km (68.6 mi)	651 km (405 mi)	PR	E35
Rest area "San Martino"	115.1 km (71.5 mi)	646 km (401 mi)	PR	E35
Reggio Emilia	138.1 km (85.8 mi)	622 km (386 mi)	RE	E35
E45 Brennero	156.1 km (97.0 mi)	605 km (376 mi)	MO	E35
Rest area "Secchia"	157.5 km (97.9 mi)	604 km (375 mi)	MO	E35 E45
Modena Nord	158.6 km (98.5 mi)	603 km (375 mi)	MO	E35 E45
Modena Sud	171.8 km (106.8 mi)	589 km (366 mi)	MO	E35 E45
E45 Ancona	189.8 km (117.9 mi)	571 km (355 mi)	BO	E35
Tangenziale di Bologna; Bologna Casalecchio – E45 Ancona; Bologna Guglielmo Marconi Airport	196.1 km (121.9 mi)	565 km (351 mi)	BO	E35
Rest area "Cantagallo"	199 km (124 mi)	561 km (349 mi)	BO	E35
Sasso Marconi	207 km (129 mi)	553 km (344 mi)	BO	E35
Variante di Valico	220 km (140 mi)	540 km (340 mi)	BO	E35
Rioveggio	223 km (139 mi)	537 km (334 mi)	BO	E35
Pian del Voglio	237 km (147 mi)	523 km (325 mi)	BO	E35
Rest area "Roncobilaccio"	242 km (150 mi)	518 km (322 mi)	BO	E35
Roncobilaccio	242 km (150 mi)	519 km (322 mi)	BO	E35
Variante di Valico	255 km (158 mi)	503 km (313 mi)	FI	E35
Rest area "Aglio"	256 km (159 mi)	504 km (313 mi)	FI	E35
Barberino	262 km (163 mi)	498 km (309 mi)	FI	E35
Calenzano – Sesto Fiorentino	278 km (173 mi)	482 km (300 mi)	FI	E35
Rest area "Bisenzio"	279 km (173 mi)	481 km (299 mi)	FI	E35
Pisa nord	280 km (170 mi)	480 km (300 mi)	FI	E35
Florence Nord; Florence Peretola Airport; Rest area "Firenze nord"	280 km (170 mi)	480 km (300 mi)	FI	E35
Florence Scandicci; Superstrada Firenze - Pisa - Livorno	286 km (178 mi)	474 km (295 mi)	FI	E35
Villa Costanza	288 km (179 mi)	472 km (293 mi)	FI	E35
Florence Impruneta previous "Firenze Certosa"; Siena – Autopalio	295 km (183 mi)	465 km (289 mi)	FI	E35
Florence Sud; Tosco Romagnola	301 km (187 mi)	459 km (285 mi)	FI	E35
Rest area "Chianti"	305 km (190 mi)	455 km (283 mi)	FI	E35
Incisa	320 km (200 mi)	440 km (270 mi)	FI	E35
Rest area "Reggello"	321 km (199 mi)	439 km (273 mi)	FI	E35
Valdarno	336 km (209 mi)	424 km (263 mi)	AR	E35
Arezzo	358 km (222 mi)	402 km (250 mi)	AR	E35
Rest area "Badia al Pino"	362 km (225 mi)	398 km (247 mi)	AR	E35
Monte San Savino	372 km (231 mi)	388 km (241 mi)	AR	E35
Rest area "Lucignano"	381 km (237 mi)	379 km (235 mi)	AR	E35
Valdichiana – Bettolle – Sinalunga; Raccordo Siena – Bettolle – Perugia	385 km (239 mi)	375 km (233 mi)	SI	E35
Rest area "Montepulciano"	395 km (245 mi)	365 km (227 mi)	SI	E35
Chiusi – Chianciano	410 km (250 mi)	350 km (220 mi)	SI	E35
Rest area "Fabro"	428 km (266 mi)	332 km (206 mi)	TR	E35
Fabro	428 km (266 mi)	332 km (206 mi)	TR	E35
Orvieto	451 km (280 mi)	309 km (192 mi)	TR	E35
Rest area "Tevere"	465 km (289 mi)	295 km (183 mi)	VT	E35
Attigliano	479 km (298 mi)	281 km (175 mi)	TR	E35
Rest area "Giove"	481 km (299 mi)	279 km (173 mi)	TR	E35
Orte; E45 Umbro-Laziale; E45 Tiberina ex Narni - Amelia	491 km (305 mi)	269 km (167 mi)	VT	E35
Magliano Sabinaex Via Flaminia	501 km (311 mi)	259 km (161 mi)	RI	E35 E45
Rest area "Flaminia"	509 km (316 mi)	251 km (156 mi)	RM	E35 E45
Roma nord Grande Raccordo Anulare di Roma; Rome Fiumicino Airport; Rome Ciampino Airport; Rome Urbe Airport	531 km (330 mi)	229 km (142 mi)	RM	E45
Rest area "Mascherone"	536 km (333 mi)	224 km (139 mi)	RM	E45
L'Aquila – Teramo	562 km (349 mi)	198 km (123 mi)	RM	E45
Rest area "Prenestina"	566 km (352 mi)	194 km (121 mi)	RM	E45
Roma sud Grande Raccordo Anulare di Roma; Rome Fiumicino Airport; Rome Ciampino Airport; Rome Urbe Airport	576 km (358 mi)	184 km (114 mi)	RM	E45
Valmontoneex Velletri	585 km (364 mi)	175 km (109 mi)	RM	E45
Colleferro	593 km (368 mi)	167 km (104 mi)	RM	E45
Anagni – Fiuggi	611 km (380 mi)	149 km (93 mi)	FR	E45
Rest area "La Macchia"	613 km (381 mi)	147 km (91 mi)	FR	E45
Ferentino ex Sora	619 km (385 mi)	141 km (88 mi)	FR	E45
Frosinone ex dei Monti Lepini	624 km (388 mi)	136 km (85 mi)	FR	E45
Ceprano	644 km (400 mi)	116 km (72 mi)	FR	E45
Pontecorvo	659 km (409 mi)	101 km (63 mi)	FR	E45
Rest area "Casilina"	660 km (410 mi)	100 km (62 mi)	FR	E45
Cassino; Abruzzo, Lazio and Molise National Park ex Formia	670 km (420 mi)	90 km (56 mi)	FR	E45
San Vittore; Venafro	679 km (422 mi)	81 km (50 mi)	FR	E45
Caianello; Telesina	701 km (436 mi)	59 km (37 mi)	CE	E45
Rest area "Teano"	708 km (440 mi)	52 km (32 mi)	CE	E45
Capua; Via Domitiana	729 km (453 mi)	31 km (19 mi)	CE	E45
Santa Maria Capua Vetere della Reggia di Caserta	720 km (450 mi)	40 km (25 mi)	CE	E45
Caserta Nord	734 km (456 mi)	26 km (16 mi)	CE	E45
Rest area "San Nicola"	737 km (458 mi)	23 km (14 mi)	CE	E45
Caserta –Salerno	739 km (459 mi)	21 km (13 mi)	CE	E45
Toll gate Napoli Nord	740 km (460 mi)	20 km (12 mi)	CE	E45
Caserta Sud	741 km (460 mi)	19 km (12 mi)	CE	E45
Pomigliano – Villa Literno; Asse di Supporto	743 km (462 mi)	17 km (11 mi)	NA	E45
Afragola – Acerra; Napoli Afragola railway station Asse Mediano	749 km (465 mi)	11 km (6.8 mi)	NA	E45
Bari	753 km (468 mi)	7 km (4.3 mi)	NA	E45
Casoria – Napoli Nord	754 km (469 mi)	4 km (2.5 mi)	NA	E45
Diramazione Capodichino; Tangenziale di Napoli; Naples Capodichino Airport	755 km (469 mi)	5 km (3.1 mi)	NA	E45
Rest area "Masseria"	755 km (469 mi)	5 km (3.1 mi)	NA	E45
Naples Centro Direzionale del Centro Direzionale; Acerra -Pomigliano d'Arco - Cercola del Vesuvio	758 km (471 mi)	2 km (1.2 mi)	NA	E45
Naples; Port of Naples; Naples; Napoli Centrale railway station	759.8 km (472.1 mi)	0.2 km (0.12 mi)	NA	E45
Salerno – Reggio Calabria	760 km (470 mi)	0.0 km (0 mi)	NA	

=== A1-A51 connection ===
RACCORDO A1-A51; A1-A51 connection
Exit	↓km↓	↑km↑	Province
Tangenziale est di Milano; Milan Linate Airport; Milan Bergamo Airport	0.0 km (0 mi)	1.7 km (1.1 mi)	MI
Milan-Naples	1.7 km (1.1 mi)	0.0 km (0 mi)	MI

=== Piazzale Corvetto connection ===
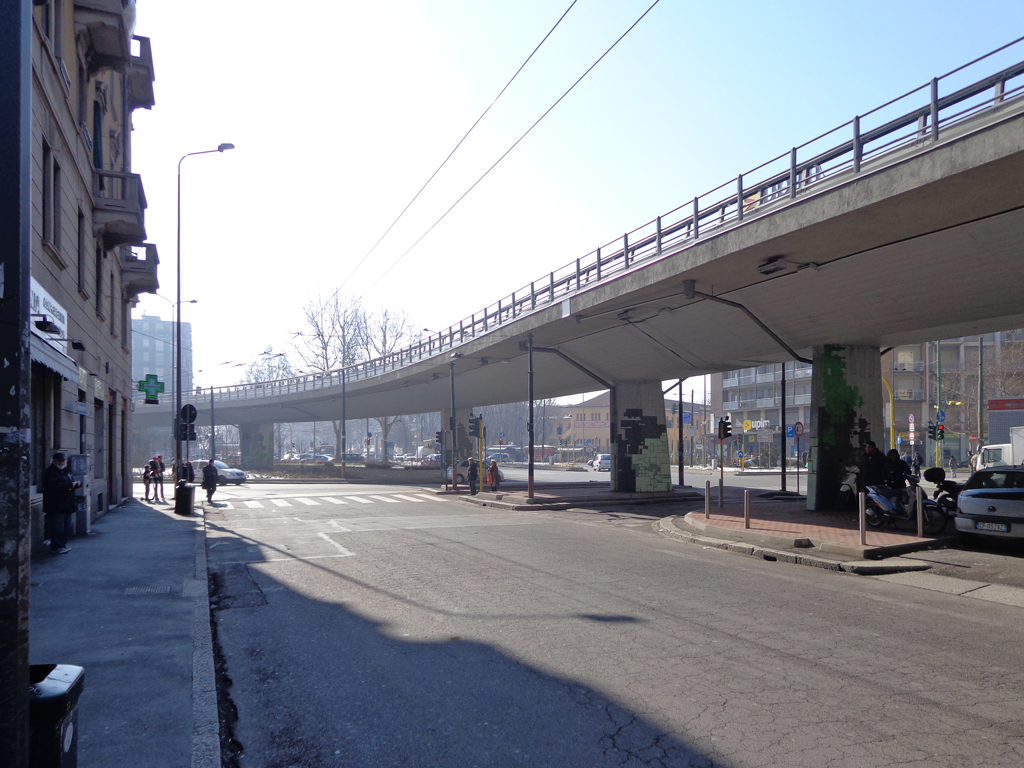
Piazzale Corvetto in Milan with the motorway connection on the right

RACCORDO PIAZZALE CORVETTO; Piazzale Corvetto connection
Exit	↓km↓	↑km↑	Province
Milan Piazzale Corvetto; Milano Porta Romana railway station Metanopoli – Old Motorway	−1.7 km (−1.1 mi)	2.7 km (1.7 mi)	MI
Tangenziale est di Milano; Milan Linate Airport; Milan Bergamo Airport	−1.5 km (−0.93 mi)	2.5 km (1.6 mi)	MI
Rest area "San Donato"	−1.0 km (−0.62 mi)	2.0 km (1.2 mi)	MI
San Donato Milanese; Poasco	0.0 km (0 mi)	1.0 km (0.62 mi)	MI
Milan-Naples	1.0 km (0.62 mi)	0.0 km (0 mi)	MI

=== Variante di Valico ===
Variante di Valico (blue) and Autostrada A1 (green)

Variante di Valico (number A1 var) is a deviation of the Autostrada A1 opened to traffic on 23 December 2015, between Sasso Marconi and Barberino di Mugello in central Italy. The entire project covers a length of 62.5 km, of which 37 km involved adding a third lane on each side of the existing A1 and 25 km the construction of the new section, most of which consists of viaducts and tunnels, the longest tunnel being 8.7 km in length. The new section runs parallel to the central part of the Bologna-Florence Autostrada A1. The earlier motorway remains open, providing an alternative route. The A1 splits up north of the Apennines, the two sections rejoining south of the mountains.

AUTOSTRADA A1 var Variante di valico
Exit	↓km↓	↑km↑	Province	European Route
Milan – Naples	0.0 km (0 mi)	32.9 km (20.4 mi)	BO	E35
Badia	17.4 km (10.8 mi)	15.5 km (9.6 mi)	BO	E35
Rest area "Badia Nuova" ovest	18 km (11 mi)	15 km (9.3 mi)	BO	E35
Firenzuola; Mugello	28.1 km (17.5 mi)	5 km (3.1 mi)	FI	E35
Milan – Naples	32.9 km (20.4 mi)	0.0 km (0 mi)	FI	E35

=== A1 Northern Rome connection ===
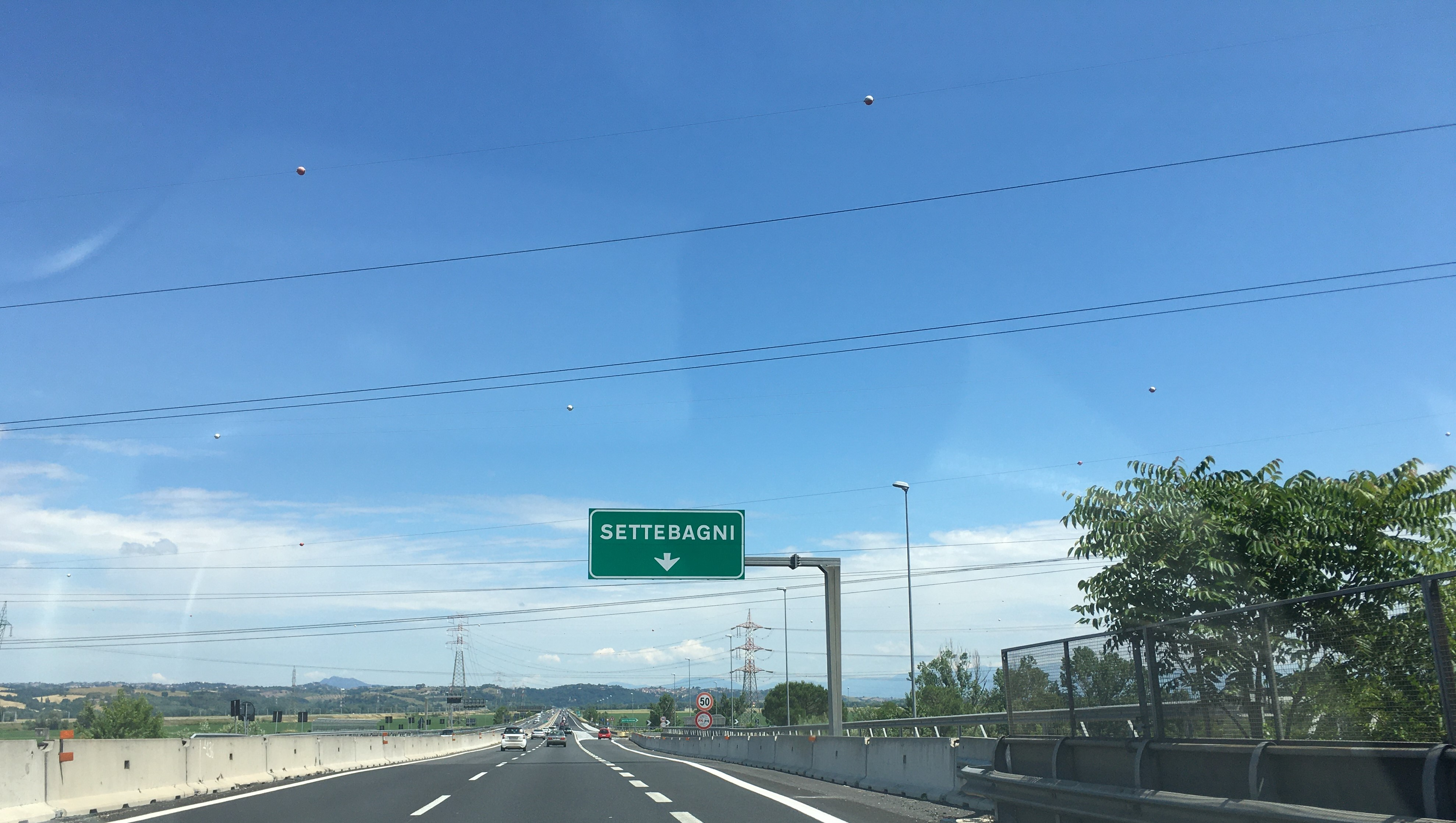
A1 Northern Rome connection near Settebagni

A1 DIRAMAZIONE ROMA NORD; A1 Northern Rome connection
Exit	↓km↓	↑km↑	Province	European route
Milan - Naples	0.0 km (0 mi)	23.0 km (14.3 mi)	RM	
Toll gate "Roma nord"	3.0 km (1.9 mi)	17.0 km (10.6 mi)	RM	E35
Rest area "Feronia"	4.0 km (2.5 mi)	16.0 km (9.9 mi)	RM	E35
Fiano Romano; Rieti	4.0 km (2.5 mi)	16.0 km (9.9 mi)	RM	E35
Castelnuovo di Porto; Monterotondo	7.0 km (4.3 mi)	9.0 km (5.6 mi)	RM	E35
Settebagni	19.0 km (11.8 mi)	4.0 km (2.5 mi)	RM	E35
Rest area "Salaria"	21.0 km (13.0 mi)	2.0 km (1.2 mi)	RM	E35
Grande Raccordo Anulare; Rome Fiumicino Airport; Rome Ciampino Airport; Rome Urbe Airport	23.0 km (14.3 mi)	0.0 km (0 mi)	RM	

=== A1 Southern Rome connection ===
A1 DIRAMAZIONE ROMA SUD; A1 Southern Rome connection
Exit	↓km↓	↑km↑	Province	European route
Milan - Naples	0.0 km (0 mi)	20.0 km (12.4 mi)	RM	
San Cesareo	5.0 km (3.1 mi)	15.0 km (9.3 mi)	RM	E821
Monte Porzio Catone	10.0 km (6.2 mi)	10.0 km (6.2 mi)	RM	E821
Rest area "Frascati"	14.0 km (8.7 mi)	6.0 km (3.7 mi)	RM	E821
Toll gate "Roma sud"	15.0 km (9.3 mi)	5.0 km (3.1 mi)	RM	E821
Torrenova; Torrenova	17.0 km (10.6 mi)	3.0 km (1.9 mi)	RM	E821
Rest area "Tuscolana"	19.0 km (11.8 mi)	1.0 km (0.62 mi)	RM	E821
Grande Raccordo Anulare; Rome Fiumicino Airport; Rome Ciampino Airport; Rome Urbe Airport	20.0 km (12.4 mi)	0.0 km (0 mi)	RM	

=== Capodichino connection ===
RAMO CAPODICHINO; Capodichino connection
Exit	↓km↓	↑km↑	Province
Milan-Naples; Naples-Salerno; Naples-Canosa	0.0 km (0 mi)	3.0 km (1.9 mi)	NA
Casoria	1.0 km (0.62 mi)	2.0 km (1.2 mi)	NA
Rest area "San Pietro"	1.5 km (0.93 mi)	1.5 km (0.93 mi)	NA
Tangenziale di Napoli; Naples Capodichino Airport	3.0 km (1.9 mi)	0.0 km (0 mi)	NA

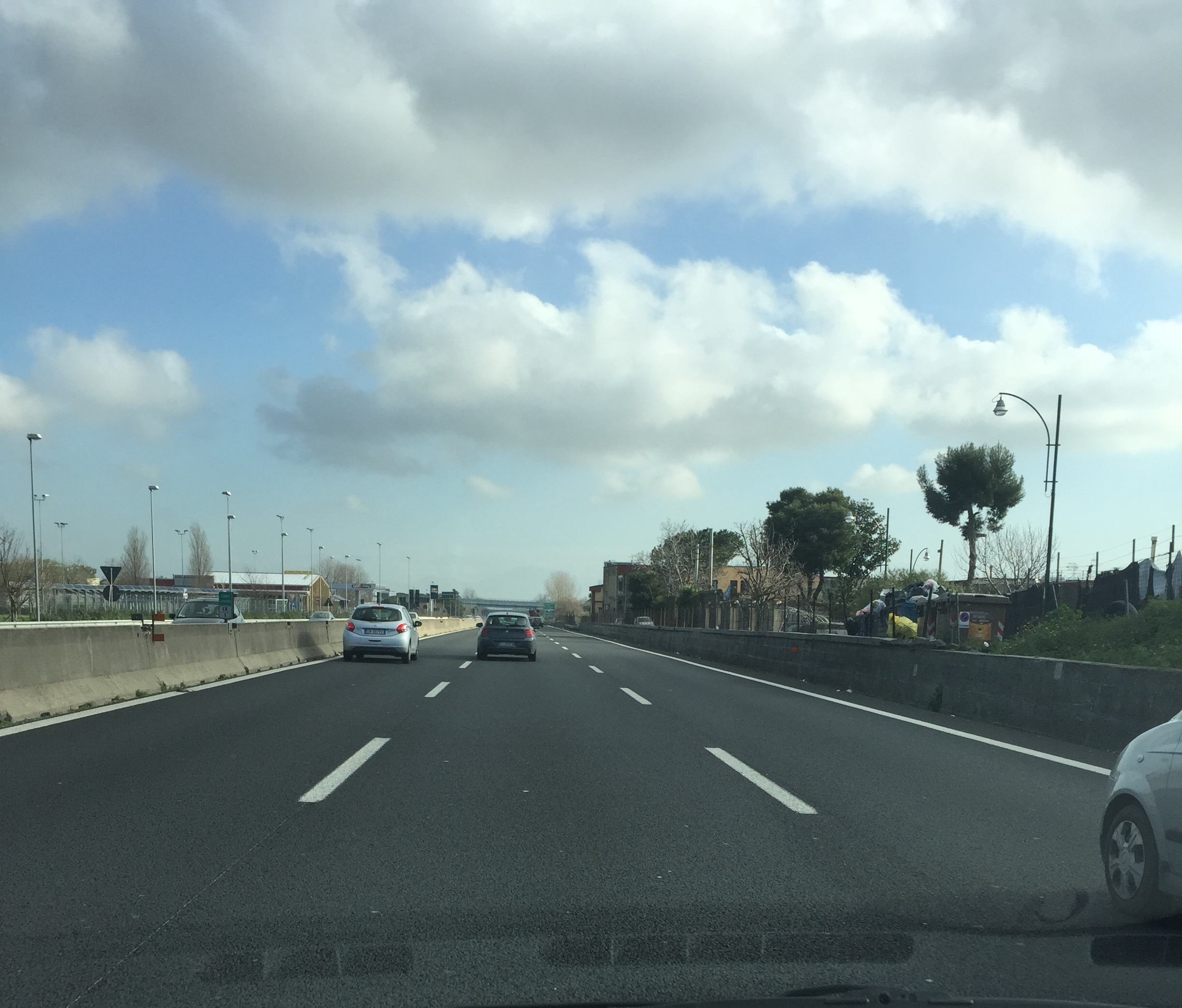
The Ramo Capodichino near Secondigliano

=== Sasso Marconi - SS 64 connection ===
RACCORDO AUTOSTRADALE SASSO MARCONI - SS64 PORRETTANA; Sasso Marconi - SS 64 connection
Exit	↓km↓	↑km↑	Province
Milan-Naples ex di Val di Setta e Val di Bisenzio	0.0 km (0 mi)	2.7 km (1.7 mi)	BO
Variante di Sasso Marconi; Sasso Marconi	2.7 km (1.7 mi)	0.0 km (0 mi)	BO

== See also ==
- Autostrade of Italy
- Roads in Italy
- Transport in Italy

=== Other Italian roads ===
- State highways (Italy)
- Regional road (Italy)
- Provincial road (Italy)
- Municipal road (Italy)
