= Ghino di Tacco =

13th-century Italian brigand

Ghinotto di Tacco, called Ghino, was an outlaw and a popular hero in thirteenth century Italy. He was born in the latter half of the thirteenth century in La Fratta, which is now part of Sinalunga in the Province of Siena. Born the son of a Ghibelline nobleman Tacco di Ugolino and brother of Turino, he was a scion of the Cacciaconti Monacheschi Tolomei family.

Along with his father and brother, he made a career of robbery and plunder while being hunted by the Sienese Republic. After they were caught, his father was executed in Siena’s Piazza del Campo, while Ghino managed to escape and sought refuge in Radicofani, a fortified city on the Via Cassia on the border between the Sienese Republic and the Papal States. There Ghino continued his career as a bandit, but in the manner of a gentleman, always leaving his victims with something to live on. Boccaccio depicts him as a good brigand (Brigante buono) in the Decameron, when relating his kidnapping of the Abbot of Cluny, in the second story of the tenth day:

Ghino di Tacco piglia l'abate di Clignì e medicalo del male dello stomaco e poi il lascia quale, tornato in corte di Roma, lui riconcilia con Bonifazio papa e fallo friere dello Spedale.

Translation: Ghino di Tacco seizes the Abbot of Cluny, cures him of his stomach ailment and then releases him; the abbot, having returned to the Roman court, reconciles Ghino with Pope Boniface and makes him prior of the Hospital.

Dante, in Canto VI, lines 13–14, of his Purgatorio points to Ghino’s ferocity when he refers to the death of the Aretine Benincasa da Latrina (jurist in Bologna, then judge of the Sienese Podestà):

Quiv'era l'Aretin che da le braccia
fiere di Ghin di Tacco ebbe la morte.

Translation: Here was the Aretine who met his death at the fierce hands of Ghin di Tacco.

== Life ==
=== Youth ===
The exact date of Ghino’s birth is unknown, but it must have been in the latter half of the thirteenth century, as there are extant reports of the actions of the Banda dei Quattro (Band of Four) which comprised his father Tacco di Ugolino, his uncle Ghino di Ugolino, Ghino himself, and his younger brother Turino. From his childhood, Ghino accompanied his father on his raids near his place of birth, the small castle-farm of La Fratta in Valdichiana.

It is believed that they had to resort to brigand activities because of the taxes imposed by the Sienese church on land properties in favor of the Papal States. The tax was deemed excessive by Ghibelline nobles of La Fratta. At that time, all the castles in the region — Asinalonga (now Sinalunga), Scrofiano, Rigomagno, Farnetella, Bettolle, Torrita di Siena — were owned by the powerful Sienese family of Cacciaconti; this granted them a degree of impunity from the central government in Siena.

This impunity ceased in July 1279 when Tacco razed the castle in Torrita di Siena. In the battle which followed, one Jacopino da Guardavalle was seriously wounded by Tacco. For this reason, aided by the Counts of Santa Fiora, Tacco and the others from the Banda dei Quattro were found guilty and condemned by the court of the Commune of Siena, which sought them for many years before capturing them in 1285. After being tortured, his uncle Ghino di Ugolino and his father Tacco di Ugolino were executed in Piazza del Campo in 1286. The sentence was given by Benincasa da Laterina (born in Arezzo) who was later appointed as senator and auditor in the court of the Papal States. Ghino and his brother Turino escaped the execution because they were underage and remained outside the political scene for some years.

=== The flight to Radicofani ===
In 1290, Ghino di Tacco returned to the “remunerative activities” started by his father, having been ordered to pay damages of 1000 soldi in recompense for a robbery he had carried out near San Quirico d'Orcia. In the meantime, Ghino showed his intention to occupy a fortified position near Sinalunga without the authorization of the Sienese commune. This course of action was not tolerated by the Sienese authorities who forced Ghino into exile beyond the borders of the Republic. Ghino fled and occupied the impenetrable fortress of Radicofani, still in the territory of the Sienese Republic, but on the border with the Papal States. Here Ghino took part in a fight for the ownership of the fortress, managed to conquer it, and made that his base for his acts of banditry. From the hill of Radicofani, Ghino continued to rob the travellers on the Via Francigena, an important route for pilgrims travelling to Rome, which here followed the ancient Via Cassia. Ghino ambushed travellers, established the real nature of the goods they were carrying, and then stripped them of almost everything, but left them enough to survive and offered them a banquet. On account of this behaviour and because he allowed students and poor people to pass without harm, Ghino was considered a "Thief and a Gentleman," a sort of Robin Hood ante litteram.

=== His notoriety ===
Proud of his reputation, he decided to avenge his father and his brother, and went to Rome to seek out Benincasa da Laterina, who had become an influential and well-known judge at the court of the Papal States. Leading four hundred men and armed with a pike, he entered the Papal tribunal in Campidoglio and beheaded Judge Benincasa. He impaled the head on his pike and brought it back to Radicofani, where he exposed the scalp on the tower for a long time. It was from this real example of punishment, having something from black chronicle fact, a golpe and a knightly feat, that Dante cited in the quoted verses of his Commedia, describing the Second Terrace of Purgatory, where the Negligent were seeking atonement.

After this macabre and theatrical feat, Ghino returned to val d'Orcia and resumed his acts of plunder, acquiring a legendary aura as a fierce and undefeated fighter. At this time, another event occurred which was to place him again under the literary spotlight. Boccaccio, in the second tale of the tenth day of Decameron, tells of how Ghino di Tacco behaved with the Abbot of Cluny. He, while travelling back from Rome after giving Pope Boniface VIII the money coming from the taxes exacted by the French Church, decided to take a cure for his liver and stomach (which were suffering from the Roman banquets) at the thermal spa of San Casciano dei Bagni. Ghino, knowing of the abbot’s coming, prepared an ambush and kidnapped him, without harming him in any way. Ghino locked the abbot in his tower in the fortress of Radicofani, giving him only bread and dried beans to eat and Vernaccia di San Gimignano to drink. This dietary regimen “miraculously” cured the abbot’s stomach pains, and he convinced the Pope to grant a pardon to Ghino di Tacco for the assassination of Benincasa, and appointed him as a Knight of St. John and Prior of the Ospedale di Santo Spirito (Hospital of the Holy Spirit). Ghino became loved again, even by Siena.

=== His end ===
Some historians claim that Ghino died in Rome. Others, such as Benvenuto da Imola, have noted that after the Papal and Sienese pardons he had no need to hide, and have argued that as a fundamentally kind man he devoted himself to acts of altruism and was killed in the first half of the fourteenth century while trying to stop a fight among foot soldiers and peasants in Asinalonga, only two kilometers from his birthplace. As an authority, Benvenuto da Imola has the advantage of being a near contemporary. He used to say that "[Ghino] wasn't so bad as some people write … but was an admirable, great and valorous man", thus furthering the rehabilitation of the character of Ghino di Tacco which had been begun by Dante and continued by Boccaccio.

== Cultural references ==
The prominent Italian politician Bettino Craxi used the pseudonym “Ghino di Tacco” when signing his op-eds in the Italian Socialist Party's newspaper Avanti!; ironically, Craxi's political career ended amid a country-wide corruption scandal, and he eventually had to flee the country to avoid jail, while his party imploded and disappeared from the political scene.

In Radicofani and Sinalunga two monuments in honour of Ghino di Tacco have been recently erected.

== Bibliography ==
- Bentivogli, B. (1991), La vendetta di Ghino di Tacco. Per il commento a 'Purgatorio ', VI 13-14, in «Filologia e Critica», XVI, pp. 267–71
- Bentivogli, B. (1992) Ghino di Tacco nella tradizione letteraria del Medioevo, a cura di Bruno Bentivogli, Salerno editore, 124pp, Rome
- B. Craxi, Ghino di Tacco. Gesta e amistà di un brigante gentiluomo, Koinè Nuove edizioni, 148pp. ISBN 88-87509-01-8
- Guastaldi, A. (1984), Sinalunga nella storia. Edizioni Lui', Sinalunga

== See also ==
- Summary of Decameron tales
- Palazzo Ghini
