= Raccordo autostradale RA6 =

Controlled-access highway in Italy

Raccordo autostradale 6
- Motorway connection 6
- Raccordo autostradale Bettolle-Perugia; Bettolle-Perugia motorway connection

Route information
- Maintained by ANAS
- Length: 59.3 km (36.8 mi)
- Existed: 1971–present

Major junctions
- West end: Bettolle
- A1 in Bettolle
- East end: Perugia

Location
- Country: Italy
- Regions: Tuscany, Umbria

Highway system
- Roads in Italy; Autostrade; State; Regional; Provincial; Municipal
← RA 5	→ RA 8

Raccordo autostradale 6 (RA 6; "Motorway connection 6") or Raccordo autostradale Bettolle-Perugia ("Bettolle-Perugia motorway connection") is an autostrada (Italian for "motorway") 59.3 kilometres (36.8 mi) long in Italy located in the regions of Tuscany and Umbria, and managed by ANAS, that allows a quick connection of the Strada statale 3 bis Tiberina (also known as E45) near the city of Perugia with the Autostrada A1 where the route begins in the locality of Bettolle, municipality of Sinalunga (Province of Siena). The RA 6 is a seamless continuation of the Strada statale 715 Siena-Bettolle and, on the other end, it continues (after a short stretch on the Strada statale 3 bis Tiberina) as Strada statale 75 Centrale Umbra up to Foligno.

== Route ==
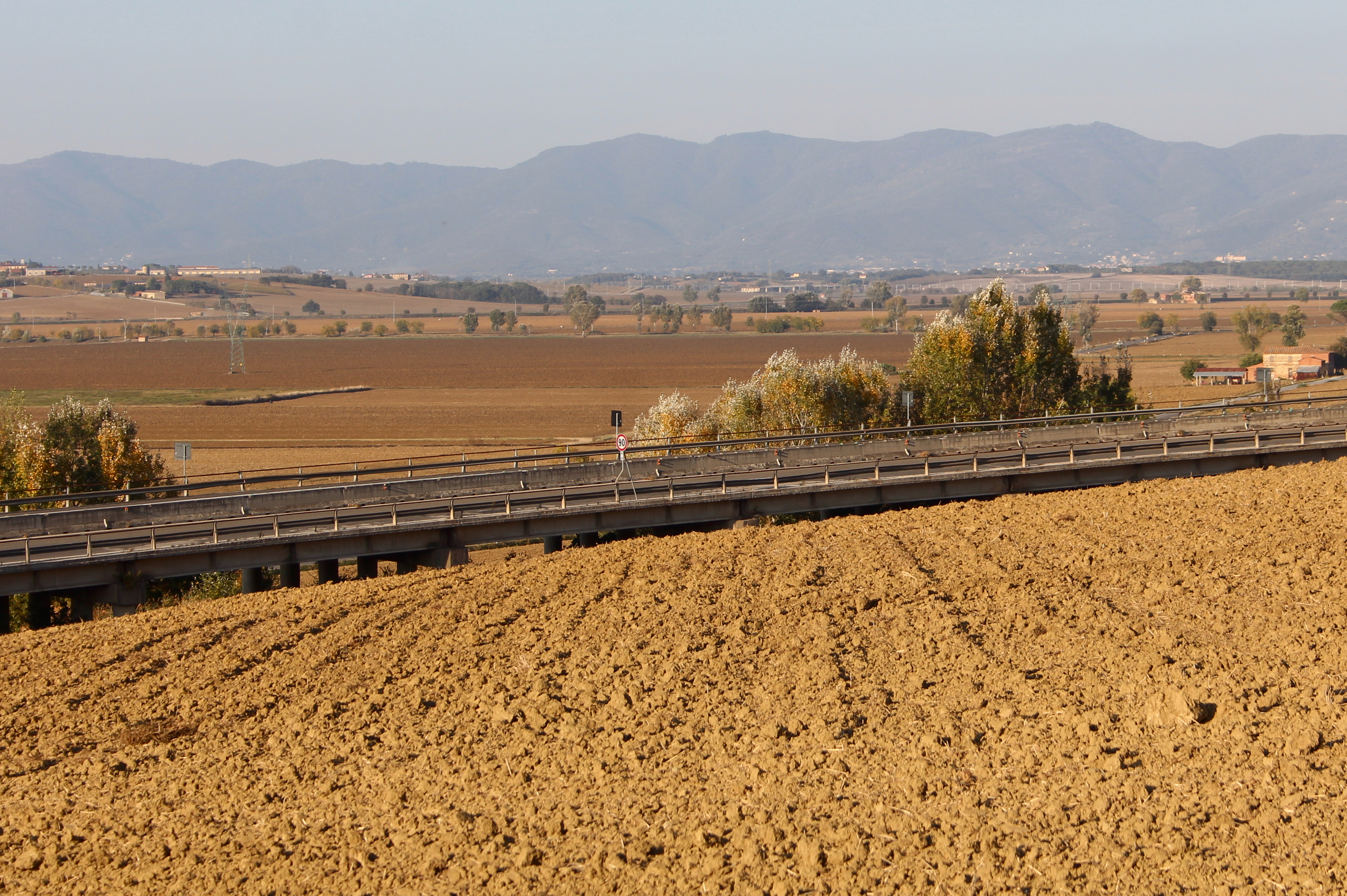
Raccordo autostradale RA6 near Cortona

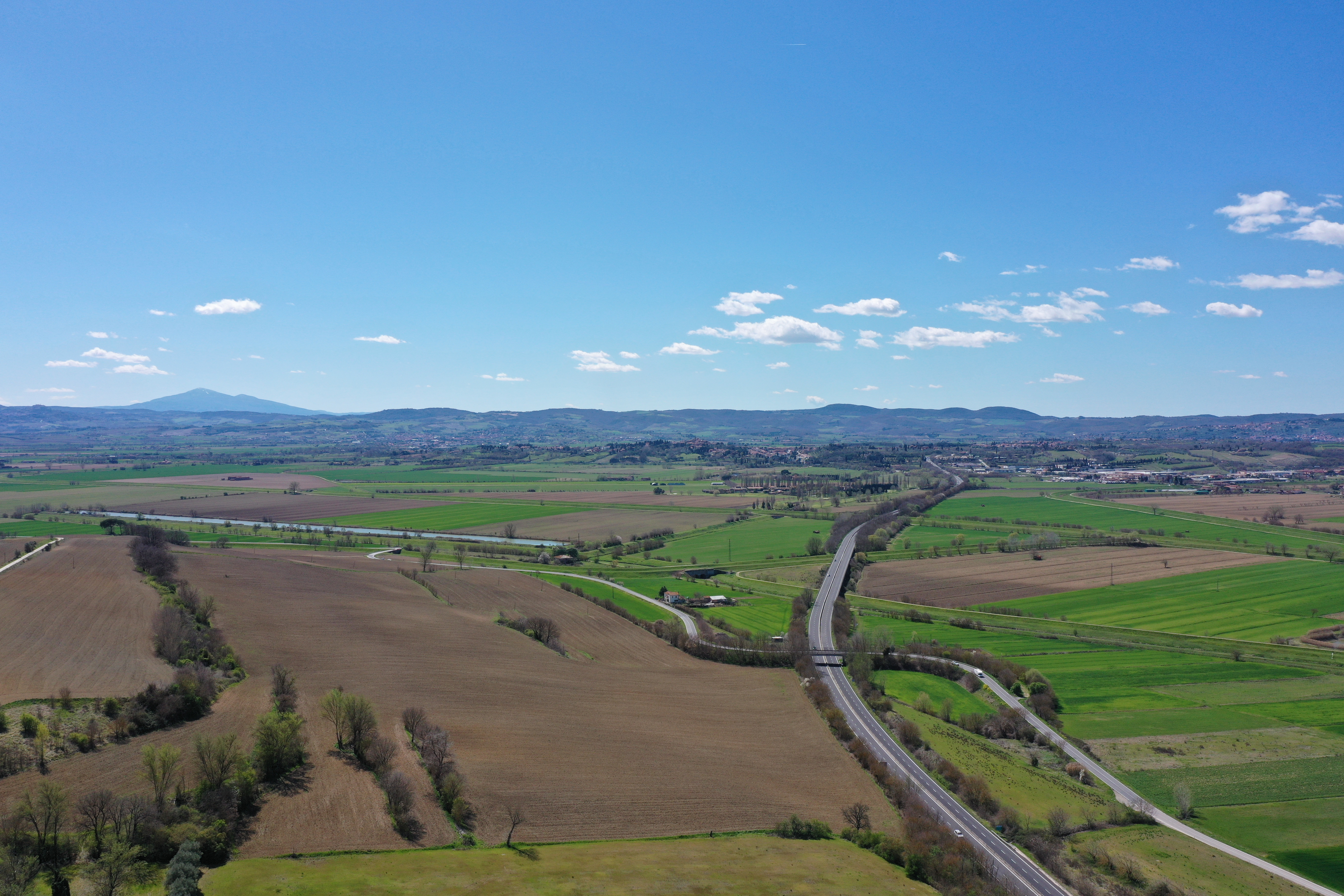
Raccordo autostradale RA6 in Valdichiana

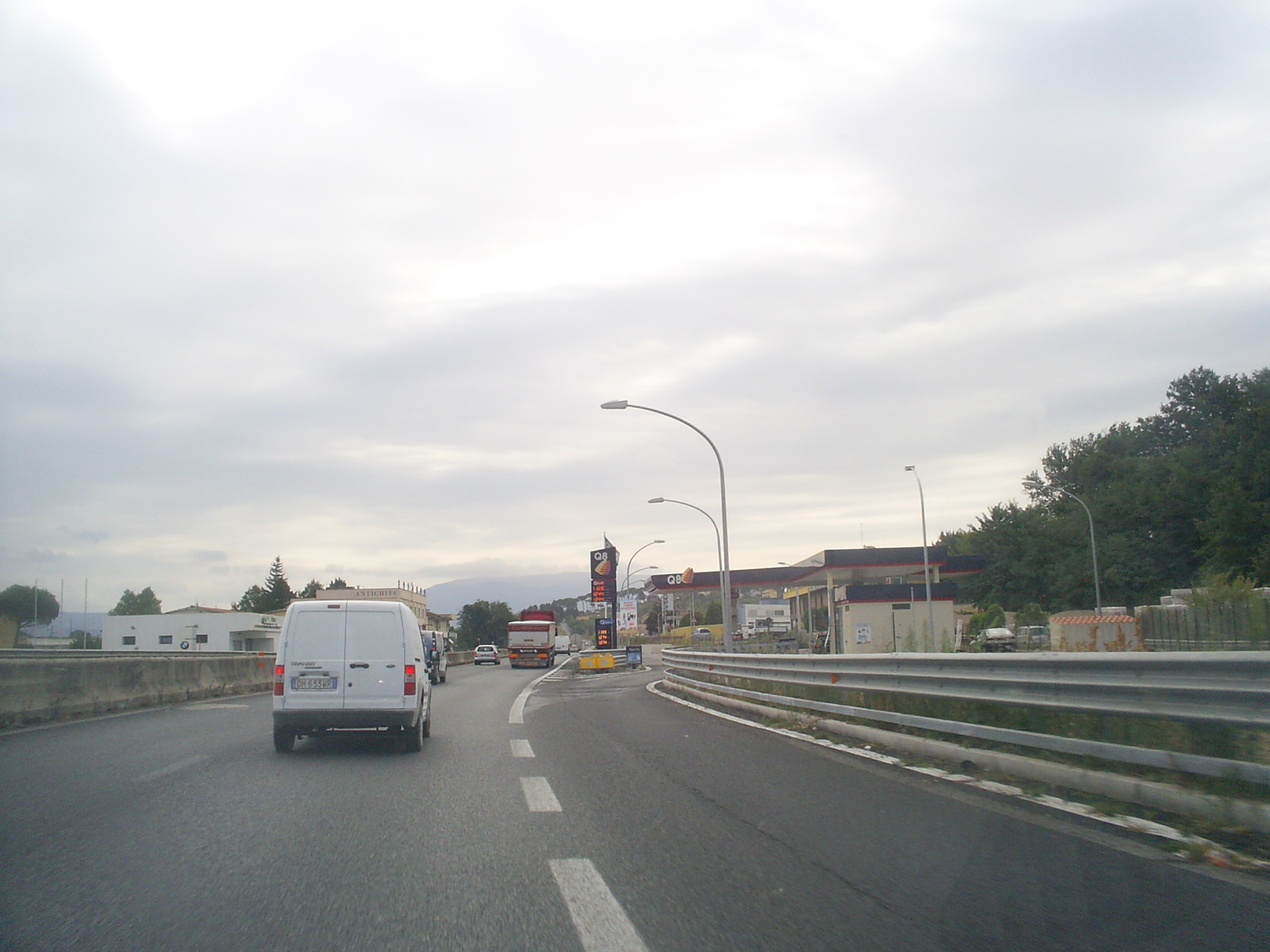
Raccordo autostradale RA6 near Perugia

RACCORDO AUTOSTRADALE 6 Raccordo autostradale Bettolle-Perugia
Exit	↓km↓	↑km↑	Province	European Route
Raccordo Siena-Bettolle; Siena	0.0 km (0 mi)	59.3 km (36.8 mi)	SI	--
Bettolle; Milano-Napoli	0.0 km (0 mi)	59.3 km (36.8 mi)	SI	--
Foiano della Chiana; Torrita di Siena; Valdichiana Outlet Village di Foiano	3.0 km (1.9 mi)	56.0 km (34.8 mi)	AR	--
Foiano della Chiana; Cortona; Farneta Abbey	12.0 km (7.5 mi)	47.0 km (29.2 mi)	AR	--
Pietraia	14.0 km (8.7 mi)	45.0 km (28.0 mi)	AR	--
Castiglione del Lago; Umbro Casentinese Romagnola; Arezzo; Camucia - Terontola di Cortona	19.0 km (11.8 mi)	40.0 km (24.9 mi)	AR	--
Tuoro; Boarding for the Lake Trasimeno islands	25.0 km (15.5 mi)	34.0 km (21.1 mi)	PG	--
Passignano Ovest	27.0 km (16.8 mi)	32.0 km (19.9 mi)	PG	--
Passignano Est	31.0 km (19.3 mi)	28.0 km (17.4 mi)	PG	--
Torricella	35.0 km (21.7 mi)	24.0 km (14.9 mi)	PG	--
Magione	40.0 km (24.9 mi)	19.0 km (11.8 mi)	PG	--
Mantignana; Corciano di Pantano	42.0 km (26.1 mi)	17.0 km (10.6 mi)	PG	--
Corciano	46.0 km (28.6 mi)	13.0 km (8.1 mi)	PG	--
Olmo	49.0 km (30.4 mi)	10.0 km (6.2 mi)	PG	--
Perugia Ferro di Cavallo; Città della Domenica	52.0 km (32.3 mi)	7.0 km (4.3 mi)	PG	--
Perugia Madonna Alta; Renato Curi Stadium	53.0 km (32.9 mi)	6.0 km (3.7 mi)	PG	--
Perugia San Faustino; Perugia	54.0 km (33.6 mi)	5.0 km (3.1 mi)	PG	--
Perugia Prepo	56.0 km (34.8 mi)	3.0 km (1.9 mi)	PG	--
Perugia Piscille	57.0 km (35.4 mi)	2.0 km (1.2 mi)	PG	--
Perugia Ponte San Giovanni	58.0 km (36.0 mi)	1.0 km (0.62 mi)	PG	--
Tiberina; Terni - Orte; Cesena - Ravenna	59.3 km (36.8 mi)	0.0 km (0 mi)	PG	--

== See also ==
- Autostrade of Italy
- Roads in Italy
- Transport in Italy

=== Other Italian roads ===
- State highways (Italy)
- Regional road (Italy)
- Provincial road (Italy)
- Municipal road (Italy)
