= Brandano =

16th-century Italian preacher

Brandano was a 16th-century Italian preacher and prophet. The sources disagree on his surname: Carosi or Garosi.

== Biography ==
He was born in Petroio in 1486 to Savino Garosi and Bartolomea called Meia. After a dissipated youth in the name of libertining and play, he converted. After moving to Montefollonico, where he married a certain Checca, he abandoned his family to go to Siena, where he embarked on a life made of hardships, alms, and penances. According to tradition, he changed his life after a stone splinter hit him on the forehead and in one eye while he was hoeing a field. Thus, frightened by what seemed to him a divine sign and conquered by the preacher fra Serafino da Pistoia, he covered himself with religion, dressing in the habit of the Augustinians. He traveled around Italy, France and Spain, preaching penances and prophesizing.

== Rome ==
In Rome, Brandano appeared at the papal court admonishing, insulting and distributing dead bones to cardinals and Pope Clement VII. This inconvenient character was immediately captured by the Swiss Guard and imprisoned, while his words produced, in vain the greatest impression in the present crowd. Shortly thereafter, however, and apparently on the orders of Clement VII himself, Brandano was freed. But evidently not satisfied, the next Easter evening he drove from Campo de' Fiori to Castel Sant'Angelo a tournique of penitents to whom he addressed the usual inflamed speech: again imprisoned, he was freed apparently during the sack by the Lanzichenecchi who seemed to have an extraordinary respect for such extravagant characters.

Perhaps in these days the legend of a first miracle of the Sienese pilgrim was born among the Roman plebs, who, thrown into the Tiber by the papal guards, would have prodigiously escaped it.

He predicted the Sack of Rome (Rome, Rome, you will soon be tame), as well as the imminent death of Pope Clement VII. The famous words he addressed to Pope Clement VII Medici: "Bastard sodomita, for your sins Rome will be destroyed. Confess and convert, because in fourteen days God's wrath will fall upon you and the city" (18 April 1527).

== Death ==
In 1548 his prophecies infuriated the Spaniards, who ruled Siena, so much so that they exiled him to Piombino. Freed from the Spanish yoke in 1552, Brandano returned to Siena and contributed to the defense of the Republic in the war with the Medici, helping the sick and hungry.

He died in Siena on 24 May 1554, shortly before the fall of the Republic of Siena. His body was exposed for three days to the veneration of the people in the Church of San Martino in Siena.

According to Vittorio Gonzi, in his book Brandano, the skull, cilicium, and tunic of the Company of St. Anthony that Brandano wore, are located in an urn at the headquarters of the Archconfraternite of Mercy of Siena. The crucifix and baryloym of the prophet became the property of the Turamini family, but traces of these objects were lost. The portrait of Brandano, executed by his nephew Anselm, is located in the church of Provenzano in Siena.

== Preaching ==
Brandano's preaching was characterized by the violence and strength with which he inveighed against the powerful, including popes and kings. This earned him fame and sympathy from the people and the poor people. It was in a sermon he gave to Radicofani that he was pointed out as the Madman of Christ.

== Bibliography ==
- Luigi Torelli, Vite dei Santi, Bologna, 1686
- Giovanni Antonio Pecci, Notizie storico-critiche sulla vita e azioni di B. da Petrojo chiamato Brandano, Lucca, 1763
- Giacomo Barzellotti, Il monte Amiata e il suo Profeta, Treves, Milano, 1910
- Piero Misciatelli, Mistici senesi, Giuntini Bentivoglio, Siena, 1913
- Vittorio Gonzi, Brandano, 2ª ed., Apollon, Roma, 1967
- Bruno Tanganelli (Tambus) (1982). Che si fa stasera, si dorme? – via Pistoiesi.
- Nello Cortigiani, Brandano, a cura di Marcello Cortigiani, Cantagalli, 2013
