= Trequanda =

- Comune
- Comune di Trequanda
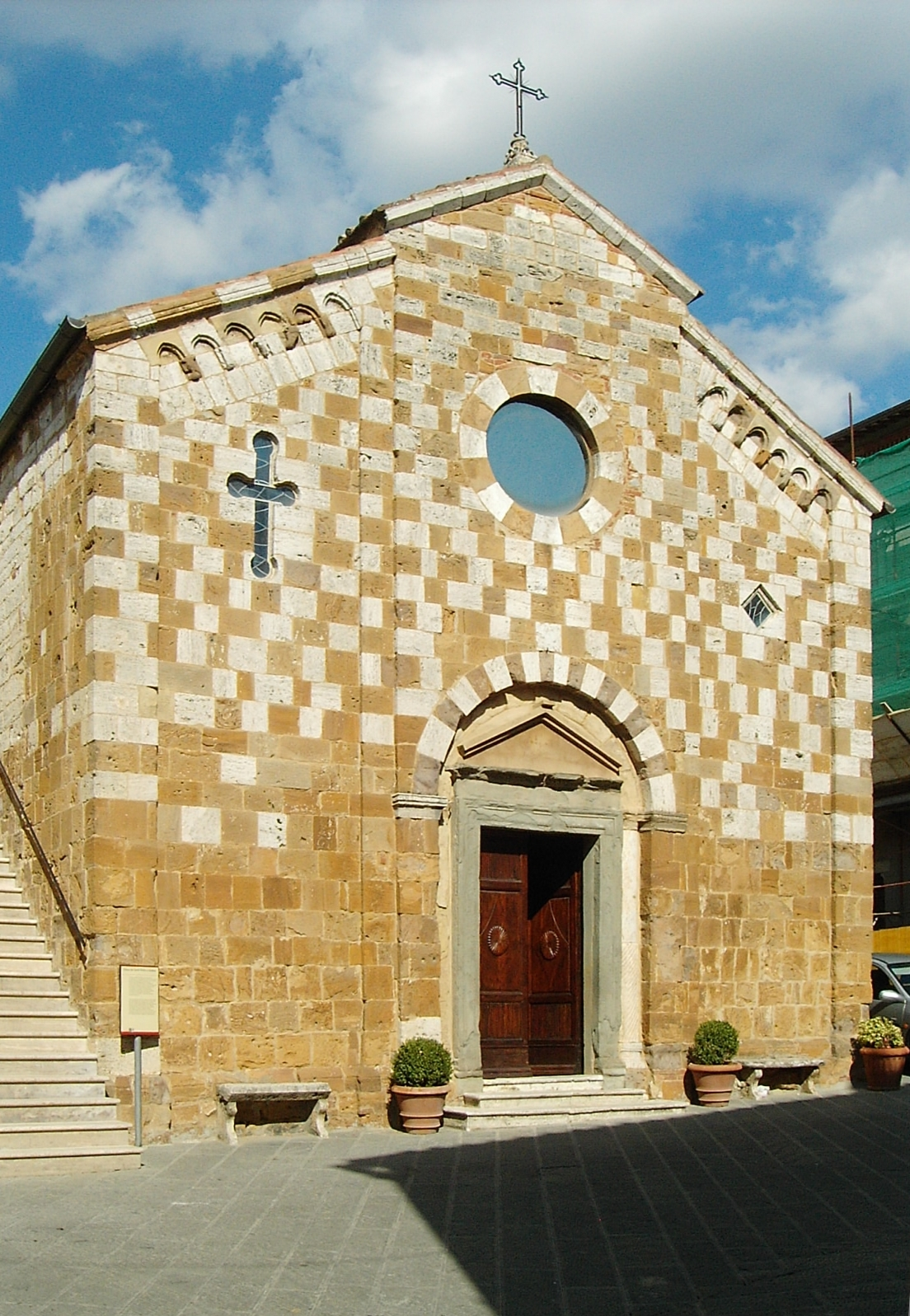
- Parish church of Sts. Peter and Paul

- Coat of arms

- Location within Italy Location within Tuscany
- Coordinates: 43°11′N 11°40′E
- Country: Italy
- Region: Tuscany
- Province: Siena (SI)
- Frazioni: Petroio, Castelmuzio

Government
  - Mayor: Andrea Francini (centre-left)

Area
  - Total: 64.1 km^{2} (24.7 sq mi)
- Elevation: 453 m (1,486 ft)

Population (31 December 2010)
  - Total: 1,380
  - Density: 21.5/km^{2} (55.8/sq mi)
- Demonym: Trequandini
- Time zone: UTC+1 (CET)
  - Summer (DST): UTC+2 (CEST)
- Postal code: 53020
- Dialing code: 0577
- Website: Official website

Trequanda is a comune (municipality) in the Province of Siena in the Italian region Tuscany, located about 70 kilometres (43 mi) southeast of Florence and about 30 kilometres (19 mi) southeast of Siena.

Trequanda borders the following municipalities: Asciano, Pienza, Rapolano Terme, San Giovanni d'Asso, Sinalunga and Torrita di Siena and consists of the following villages: Trequanda, Castelmuzio and Petroio.

The parish church, in Gothic-Romanesque style, was built from 1327, and later renovated in Renaissance style. It houses an Ascension attributed to Il Sodoma and a terracotta of "Madonna with Child" attributed to Andrea Sansovino. The high altar (15th century) is by Giovanni di Paolo.
