= E78 =

E78 may refer to:

- European route E78, a road that goes between Grosseto and Fano in Italy and links the Mediterranean and Adriatic coasts
- E78, ECO code for a variation of the King's Indian Defence, Four Pawns Attack chess opening
- Higashikyushu Expressway (between Kiyotake JCT and Kajiki JCT), route E78 in Japan
