= Paolo Di Falco =

Italian painter (1674–?)

Paolo Di Falco or Paolo Antonio Onofrio Di Falco (1674 in Naples – ?) was an Italian painter of the Baroque period, depicting mainly religious subjects. He also became a cleric.

== Biography ==
He trained in Naples under Francesco Solimena, and in 1689, he became a cleric and a canon of the Cathedral of Cerreto Sannita. In the first decade of the 18th century, he painted altarpieces for local churches, among them: the Miracle of Soriano (1710) for the cathedral, a Madonna and Child among Saints for the Collegiata di San Martino, Christ and the Souls of Purgatory, and another Madonna and Child among Saints for the church of Santa Maria al Monte dei Morti of Cerreto. The latter was painted in a style influenced by Paolo de Matteis.
