= European route E78 =

Road in trans-European E-road network

E78

Major junctions
- South-West end: Grosseto, Tuscany
- North-East end: Fano, Marche

Location
- Countries: Italy

Highway system
- International E-road network; A Class; B Class

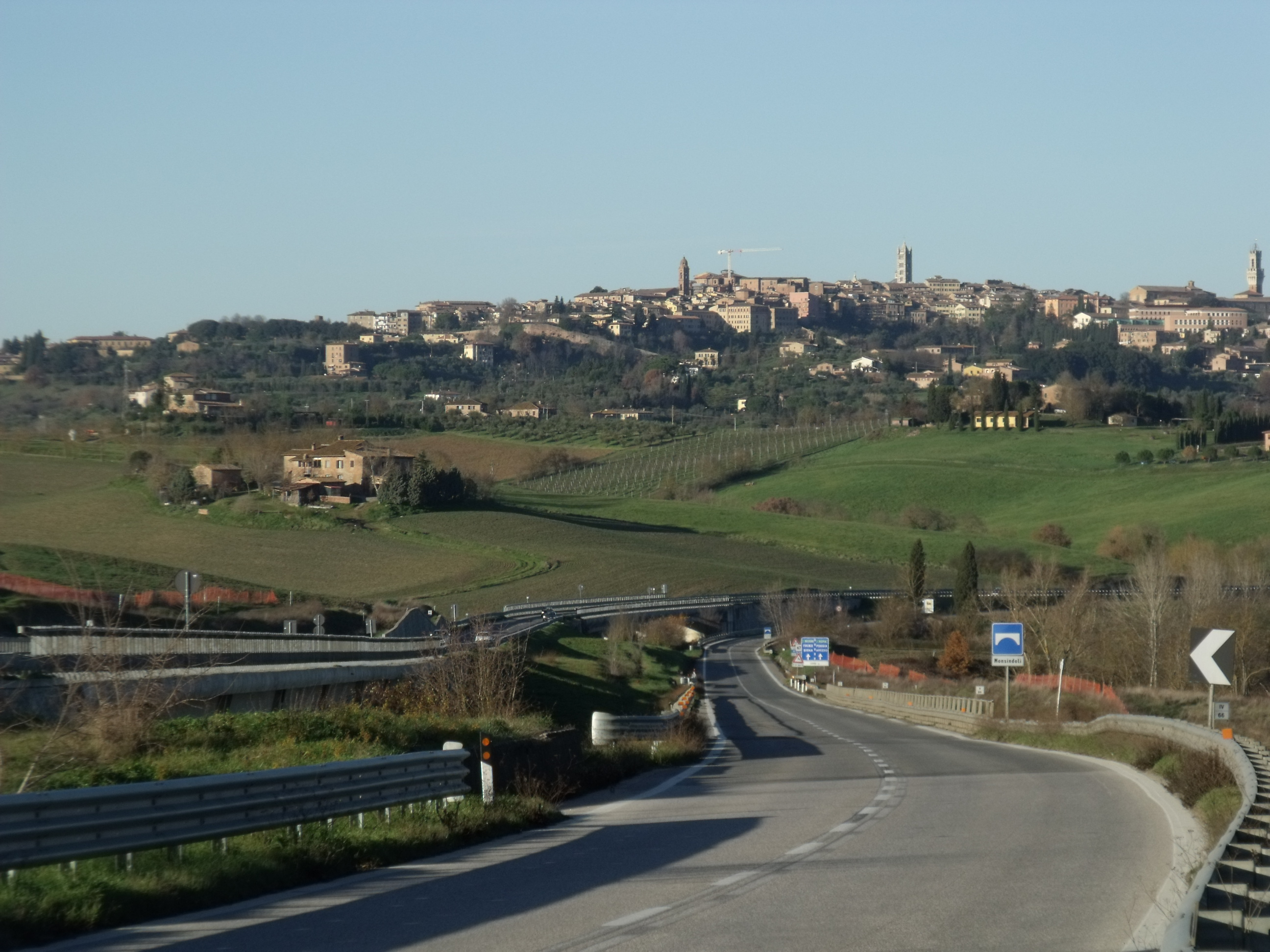
European route 78 near Siena.

European route E 78 is a road. It begins in Grosseto and ends in Fano (PU). It links the Tyrrhenean and Adriatic coasts.

The road follows: Grosseto - Siena - Arezzo - Città di Castello/Selci Lama - Fano. It intersects with the E80 at Grosseto, with the E35 at Bettolle, with the E45 at Città di Castello/ Selci Lama and terminates at the E55 at Fano.

At present, not a single part of the E78 is constructed at motorway standard. Even though sections are dual carriageway, the Apennine section is not at the standard laid down for E-roads in the European Agreement on Main International Traffic Arteries (which applies to E-routes). Plans to upgrade the entire route have existed since the late 1960s. This project is significant, because the completed E78 would be the only fully grade-separated and fully dual carriageway route between the Tyrrhenean and Adriatic coasts in an area that runs from Rimini to Pescara. There are plans to create other similar links in the area.

The first phase of the project consists of an upgrade of the existing Grosseto - Siena road, continuing to the A1 at Bettolle. As of 2021, 49 of the 63,5 km had been completed, and work on another 2,8 km was in progress, whereas the remaining 11,8 km were being verified for implementation. The duplex with the A1 stops near Arezzo. From there, the E78 is intended to run directly east to Fano. Plans to shortcut the A1 duplex by creating a direct link from Rigomagno on the Siena - Bettolle route to the new Arezzo - Fano route are in study. The Siena - Bettolle link was completed in 2008 and sections of road at the Eastern and Western terminus expressways. For the rest, the E78 currently (May 2010) consists of a patchwork of sections of upgraded road, sections in the process of being upgraded and sections still to be upgraded.

The Apennine crossing will run via the 5,960 m (19,550 ft) Galleria della Guinza tunnel between Mercatello sul Metauro and Lama di San Giustino. While a first tube of this tunnel was constructed between 1990 and 2004, construction of the second tube was interrupted as a result of a lack of funds. The first tube is currently unused, because it lacks connecting roads on its western end; only grading northeast of Cantone gives any indication that the tunnel has a western end. As at May 2010, studies as to the construction of this link are still pending. In 2016 there is an agreement for the total construction of the E78. It will cost 680 millions € for the Tuscan part and 520 millions € for the Umbrian part.
