= Santa Maria delle Nevi, Sinalunga =

Church in Sinalunga, Italy

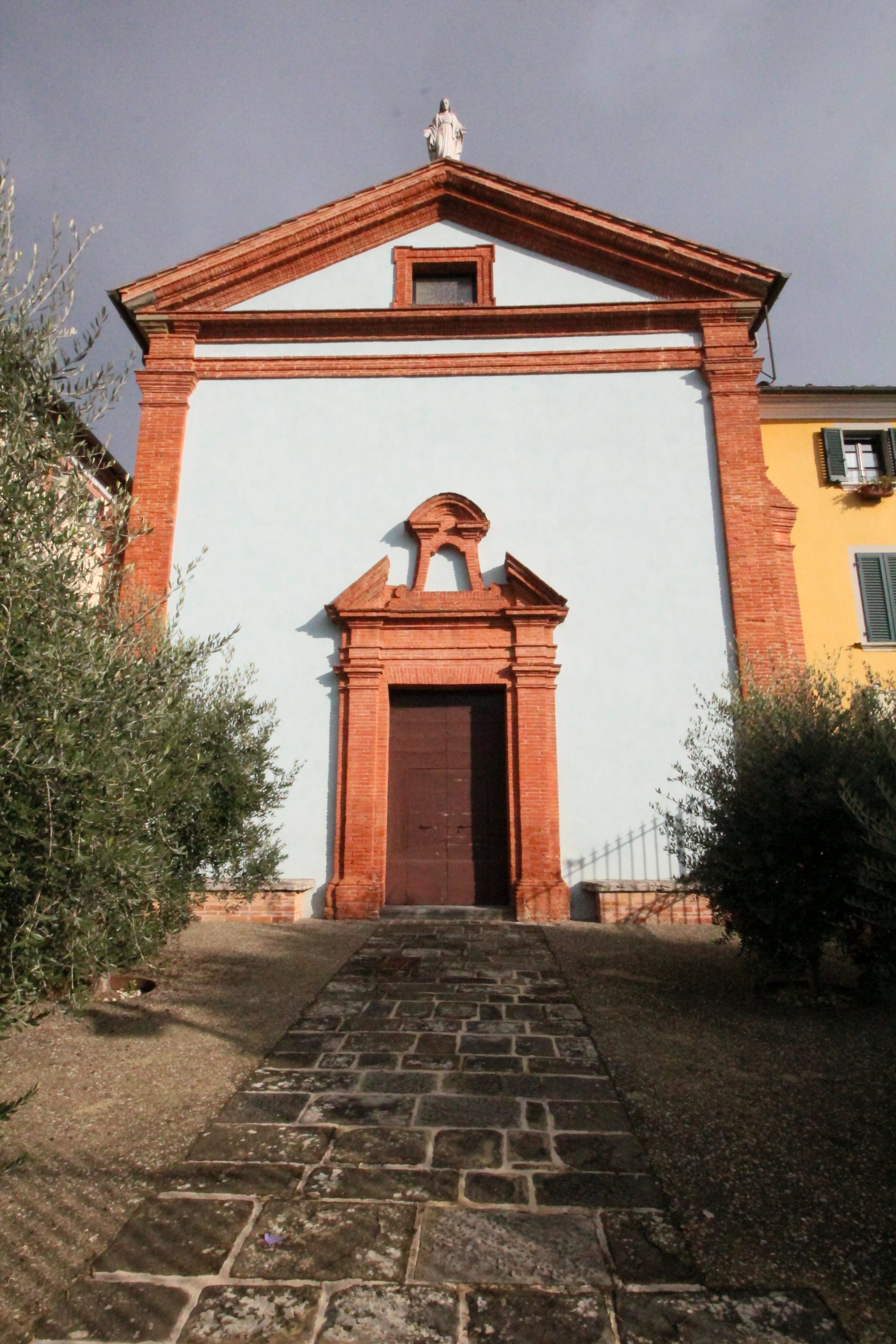
Facade of Santa Maria delle Nevi

Santa Maria delle Nevi is a small, Renaissance-style, Roman Catholic church on Piazza Garibaldi in Sinalunga, province of Siena, region of Tuscany, Italy. It is now part of the Diocese of Montepulciano-Chiusi-Pienza.

The church was built in the 16th century, but underwent a number of reconstructions. The church is dedicated to the Madonna delle Nevi (Madonna of the Snows). The interior has a main altarpiece depicting Madonna and child attributed to Benvenuto di Giovanni. A 15th-century Sienese bas-relief of Madonna and Child and Angels is found on one wall.
