= San Pietro ad Mensulas =

Coordinates: 43.2138°N 11.7438°E

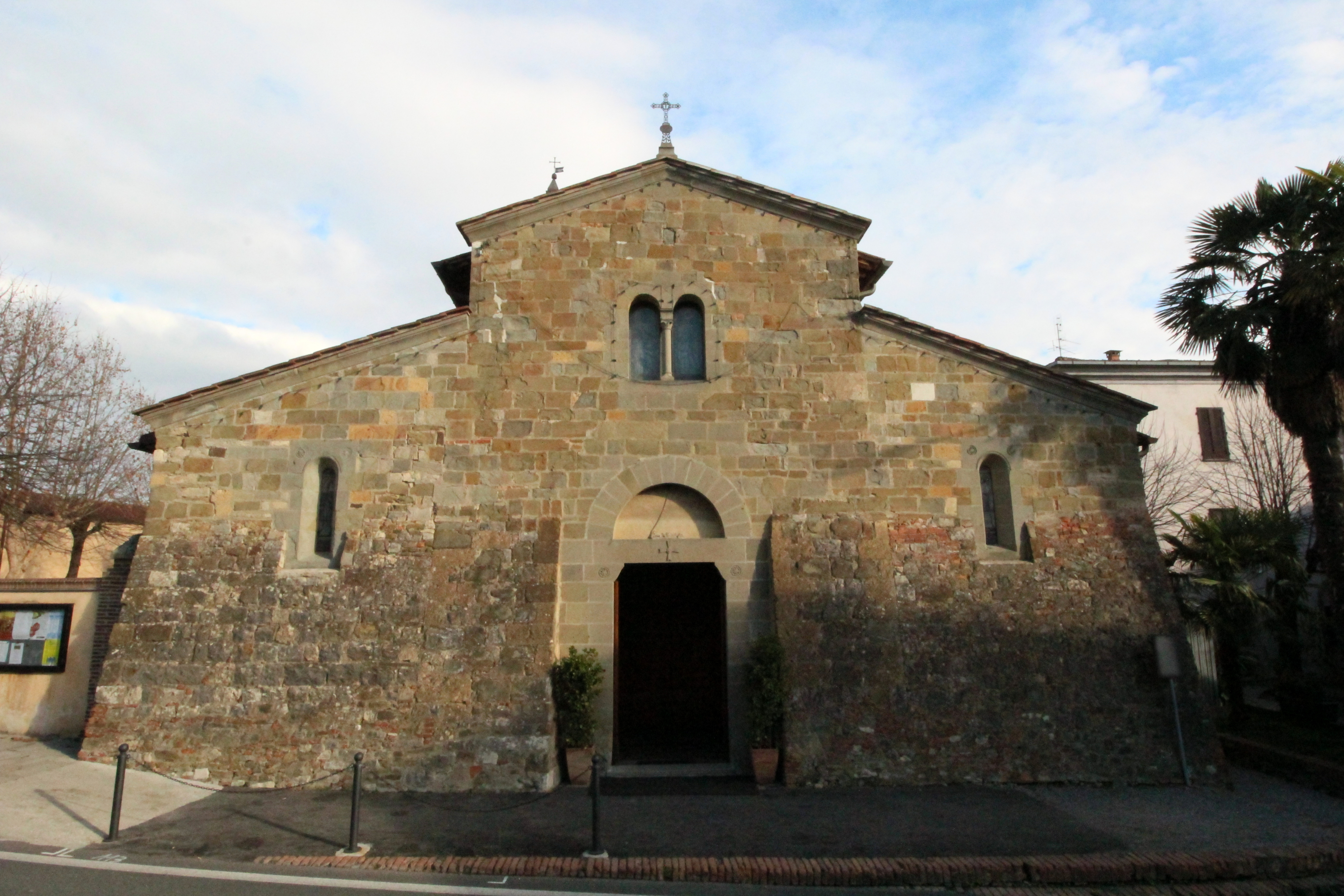
Facade of San Pietro ad Mensulas

San Pietro ad Mensulas is a Romanesque-style, Roman Catholic church just outside Sinalunga, province of Siena, region of Tuscany, Italy. It is now part of the Diocese of Montepulciano-Chiusi-Pienza.

The church was built as a parish in the lower, then marshy parts of the country, putatively one of seven parishes founded by St Donatus of Arezzo in the 4th century. The Romanesque basilica structure is still evident after 19th-century restorations. The nave is separated from aisles by thick square columns. The interior has some degraded medieval frescoes by school of Guidoccio Cozzarelli, and some later Renaissance art additions. An altarpiece dated 1634 depicts the Granting of the Keys to Peter.
