= Santa Croce, Sinalunga =

Church in Sinalunga, Italy

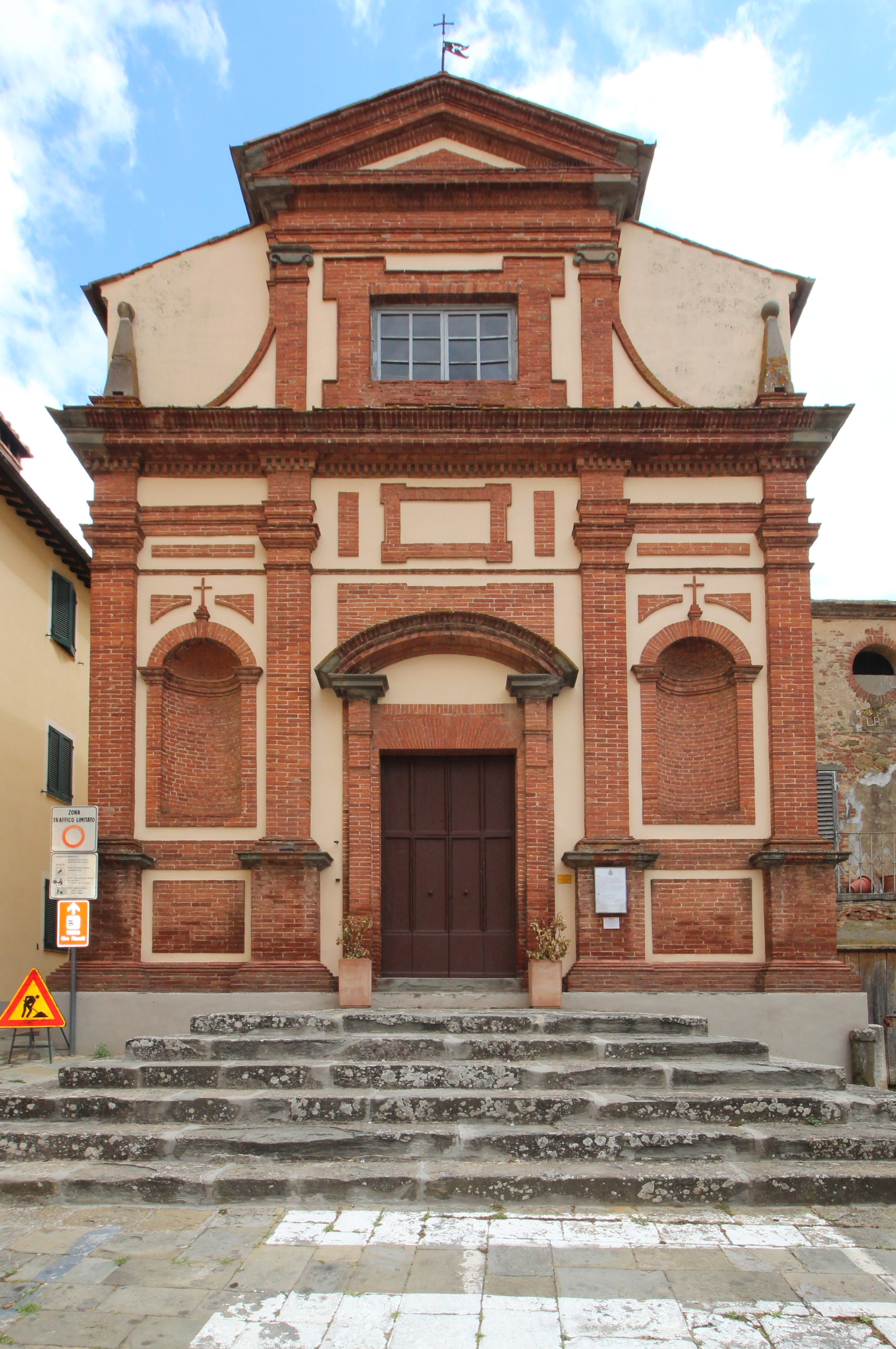
The church Santa Croce

Santa Croce is a Renaissance-style, Roman Catholic church in the center of Sinalunga, province of Siena, region of Tuscany, Italy. It is now part of the Diocese of Montepulciano-Chiusi-Pienza.

The church stands adjacent to, but predates, the Collegiata di San Martino. The façade dates to the a Mannerist architect of the 16th century. The façade has an empty frame above the central portal and other awkward elements. The church has lost many of the artworks, but still retains an altarpiece by the school of Luca Signorelli, depicting the Marriage of the Virgin.
