= Palazzo Ghini =

Building in Cesena, Italy

Coordinates: 44°08′20.09″N 12°14′44.14″E

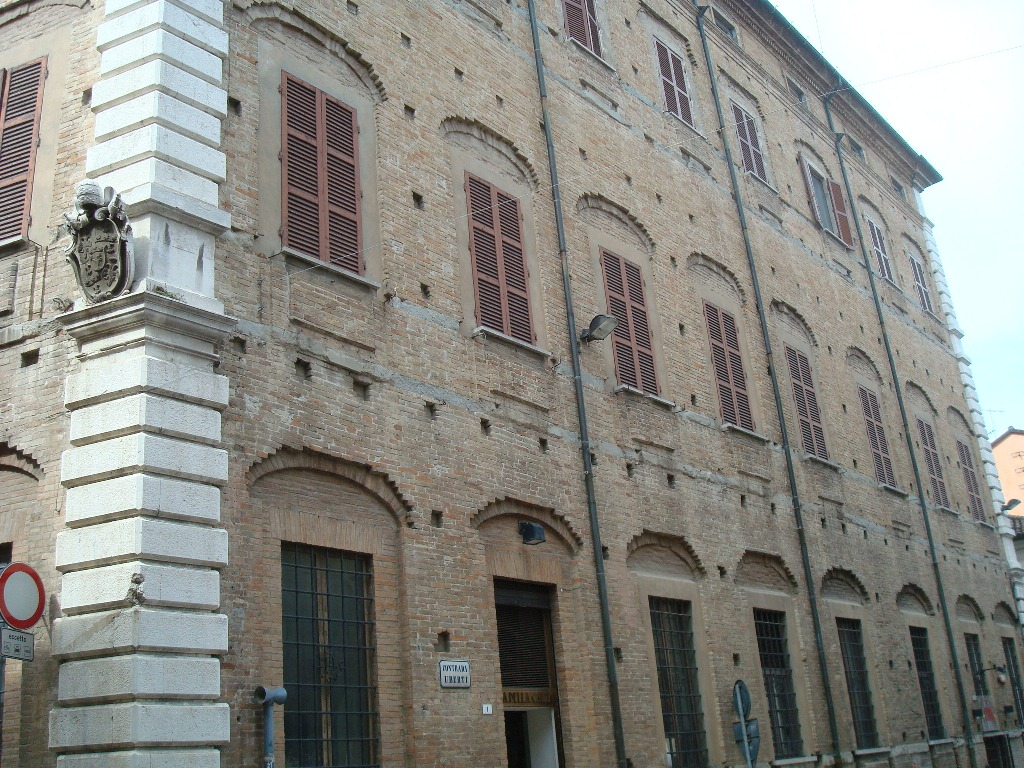
Palazzo Ghini

The Palazzo Ghini is a palace of the aristocratic Ghini family in Cesena, Italy. Located in Corso Sozzi, it is the best known of the five palaces of the same family. Its location in the old center of Cesena has been the site of many archeological finds indicating that several Roman buildings stood there in the 3rd–2nd centuries BC.

== History ==
The Ghini family has ancient roots in Italy, and is still extant. They were members of the nobility in Siena by the early 13th century. Angelo Ghini was an ambassador to Pope Urban IV, and Martin Ghini was appointed Rector of the Cassino Benedictine Congregation in 1286. Ghino di Tacco, sea-captain and gentleman brigand, lived in the late 13th and early 14th centuries; Negro Ghini, Knight of Jerusalem and Crusader leader, died in Rhodes in 1330. The Ghini family gave birth to Pope Pius VII.

Around 1600 the Pope appointed the Ghini, who were already counts, to be marquesses of Romagna and patricians of Cesena and San Marino, and also gave them the fief of Roccabernarda. Giovanni II acquired the site on which the palace now stands and several other properties and in 1654, the family moved to Cesena.

The current palace was commissioned in the 1680s by the brothers Giacomo Francesco and Alessandro Bruno from the Cesena architect Pier Mattia Angeloni.

Following a split between heirs, Monsignor Ghino Ghini, one of the most prominent people in the culture of Cesena at the turn of the 19th-20th centuries, was able to acquire sole ownership of the building, while the other Ghini heirs received other Ghini properties including the other Ghini palaces that remain in Cesena. Monsignor Ghino gave the building the connotation of an ecclesiastical residence and donated it to the Cesena Jesuits, who, following his wishes, established their headquarters there from 1942 to 1962. The building therefore now belongs to the Curia.

== Architecture ==
Located in the old center of Cesena near the station and the Corso Cavour, the building makes an imposing impression, being taller than the adjacent historic buildings and having quoins of Istrian marble decorated with the papal insignia of Pius VI, who was a member of Ghini family. The massive exterior facade has putlog holes indicating incompleteness. The courtyard facade is one of the most evocative in Cesena, with a splendid three-storey gallery, with white stone columns on the two lower levels, which affords a view of the front of the Malatestiana Library. The stairway leads to a hall decorated with four statues by Francesco Calligari (Minerva, Ceres, Glory and Mars), from which one enters the great hall of honor, characterized by a cycle of 13 frescos (originally 15) on mythological subjects, created by Giacomo Bolognini between 1719 and 1721.

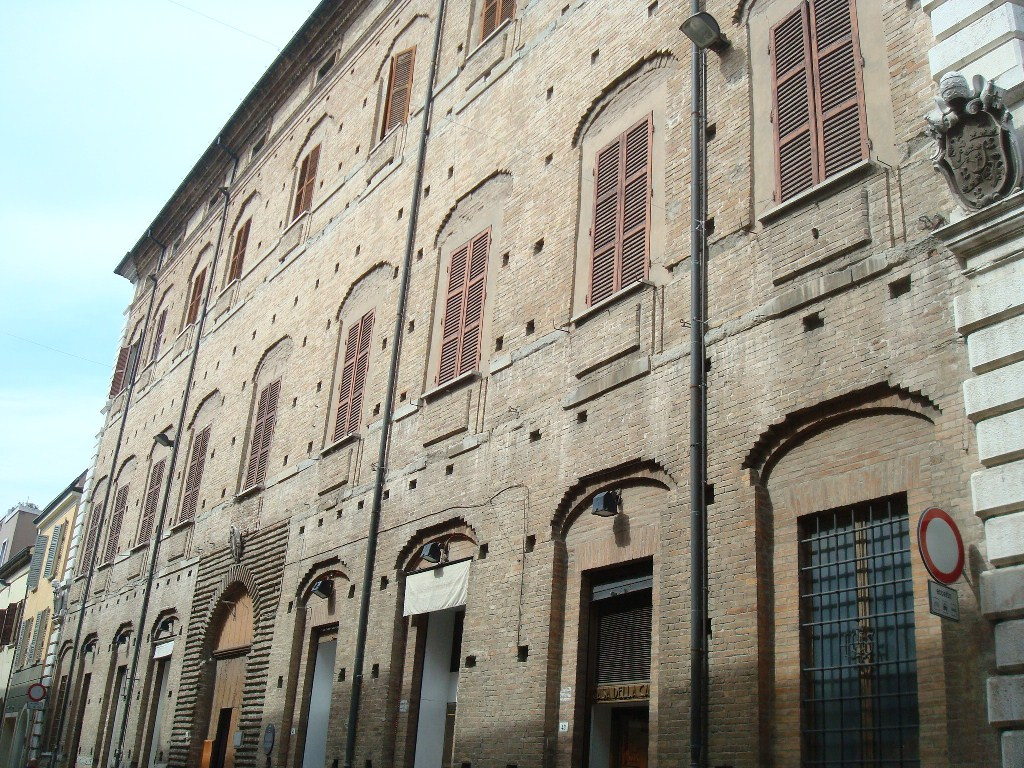
Another view of street facade

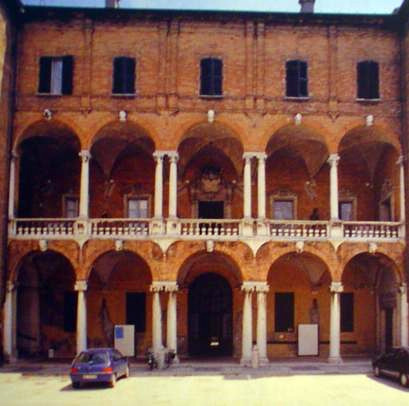
Courtyard view

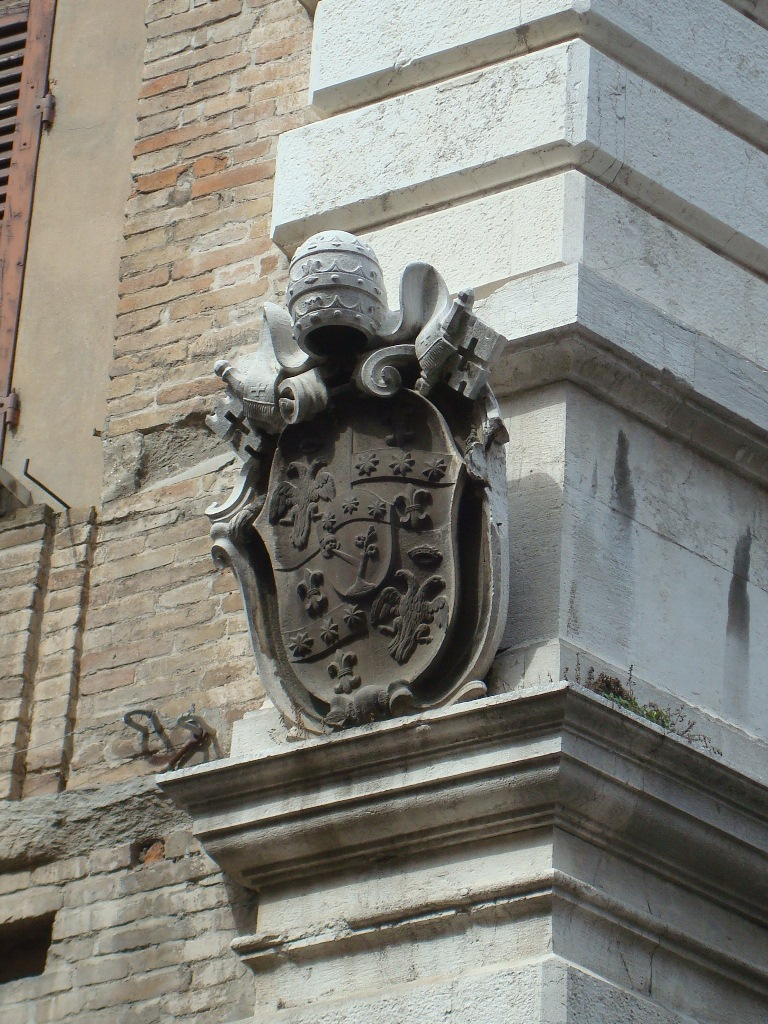
Papal arms of Pius VI on the facade

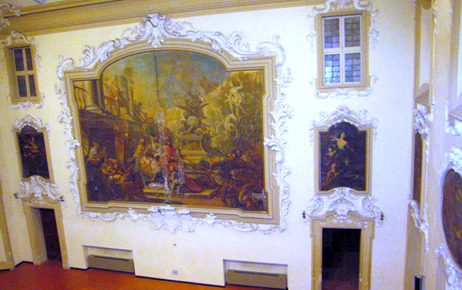
Fresco

== See also ==
- Pope Pius VI
- Cesena
