= Castelmuzio =

- Frazione
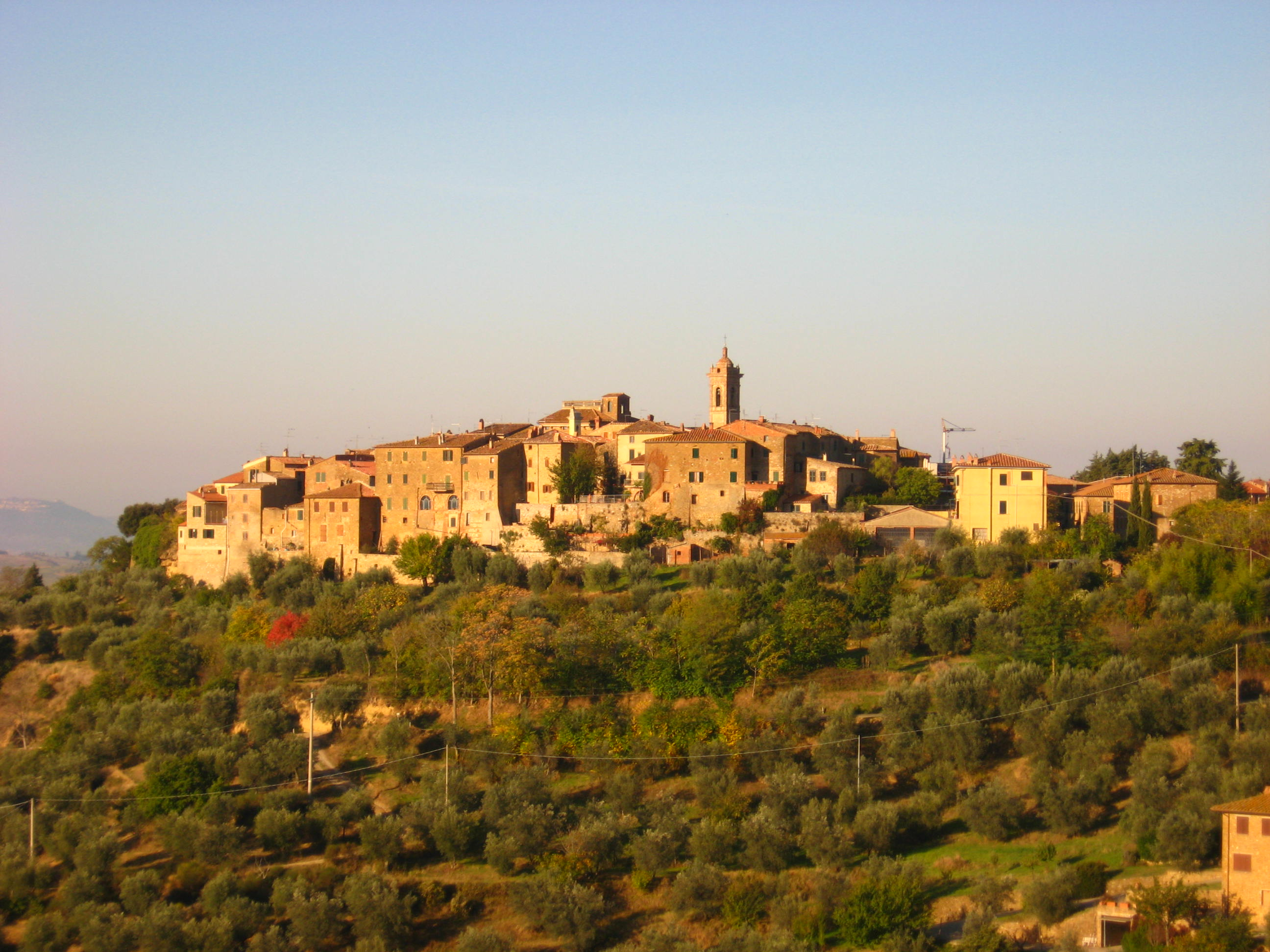
- View of Castelmuzio

- Location of Castelmuzio in Italy
- Coordinates: 43°8′30″N 11°39′34″E
- Country: Italy
- Region: Tuscany
- Province: Siena (SI)
- Comune: Trequanda
- Elevation: 443 m (1,453 ft)

Population (2011)
  - Total: 265
- Demonym: Castellini
- Time zone: UTC+1 (CET)
  - Summer (DST): UTC+2 (CEST)

Castelmuzio is a village in Tuscany, central Italy, administratively a frazione of the comune of Trequanda, province of Siena. At the time of the 2001 census its population was 265.

Castelmuzio is about 55 km from Siena and 8 km from Trequanda.
