= Guazzino =

- Frazione
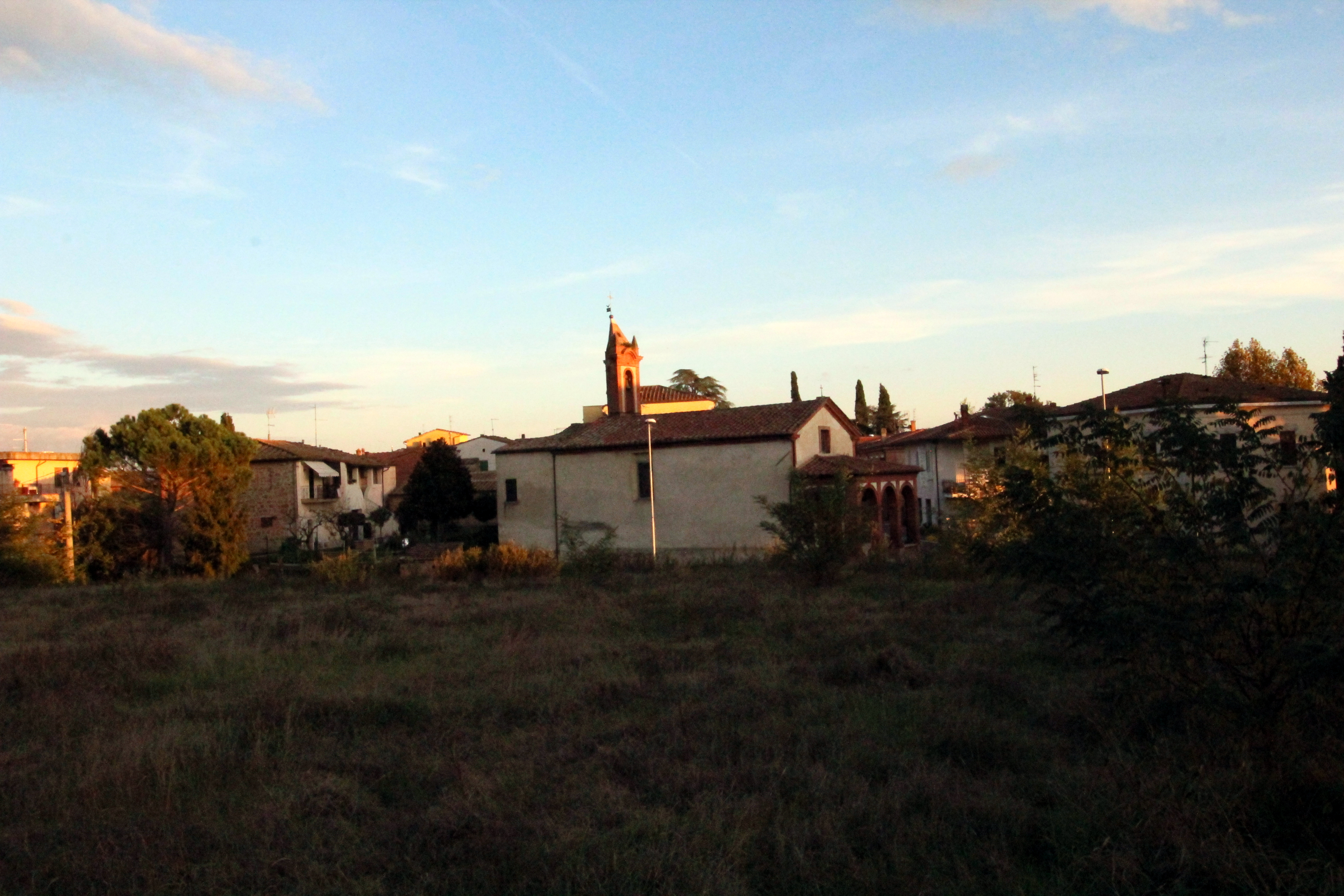

- Location of Guazzino in Italy
- Coordinates: 43°12′46″N 11°46′55″E
- Country: Italy
- Region: Tuscany
- Province: Siena (SI)
- Comune: Sinalunga
- Elevation: 282 m (925 ft)

Population (2011)
  - Total: 1,004
- Time zone: UTC+1 (CET)
  - Summer (DST): UTC+2 (CEST)

Guazzino is a village in Tuscany, central Italy, administratively a frazione of the comune of Sinalunga, province of Siena. At the time of the 2001 census its population was 797.
