= Scrofiano =

- Frazione
- A view of Scrofiano

- Location of Sinalunga in the Province of Siena

- Location of Scrofiano in Italy
- Coordinates: 43°13′51″N 11°42′56″E
- Country: Italy
- Region: Tuscany
- Province: Siena
- Comune: Sinalunga
- Elevation: 374 m (1,227 ft)

Population (2001)
  - Total: 247
- Demonym(s): Scrofianese, -i
- Time zone: UTC+1 (CET)
  - Summer (DST): UTC+2 (CEST)
- Postal code: 53048
- Dialing code: 0577
- Patron saint: St. Blaise
- Saint day: February 3

Scrofiano is a village in Tuscany, central Italy, a frazione of the comune of Sinalunga in the province of Siena. It is located on a hill in Val di Chiana, a few kilometers from Sinalunga proper.

Scrofiano was founded in around the 11th century. It is known however with certainty from the 12th century, when it was a fief of the Cacciaconti family, as part of the Republic of Siena. In the early 15th century it was the seat of a decisive battle between the Ghibelline Sienese and the Guelph Florentines.

In 1554 its castle was besieged by the Imperial-Florentine troops, which destroyed its walls.

== Main sights ==
- Torre del Cassero (12th century)
- Palazzo Comunale (14th-15th centuries)
- The Collegiata di San Biagio church (13th century), housing a canvas by Santi di Tito portraying the Pietà with St. Francis (c. 1580).
- The church of the Company of San Salvatore is also home to a work by Santi di Tito.
