= Montefollonico =

- Frazione
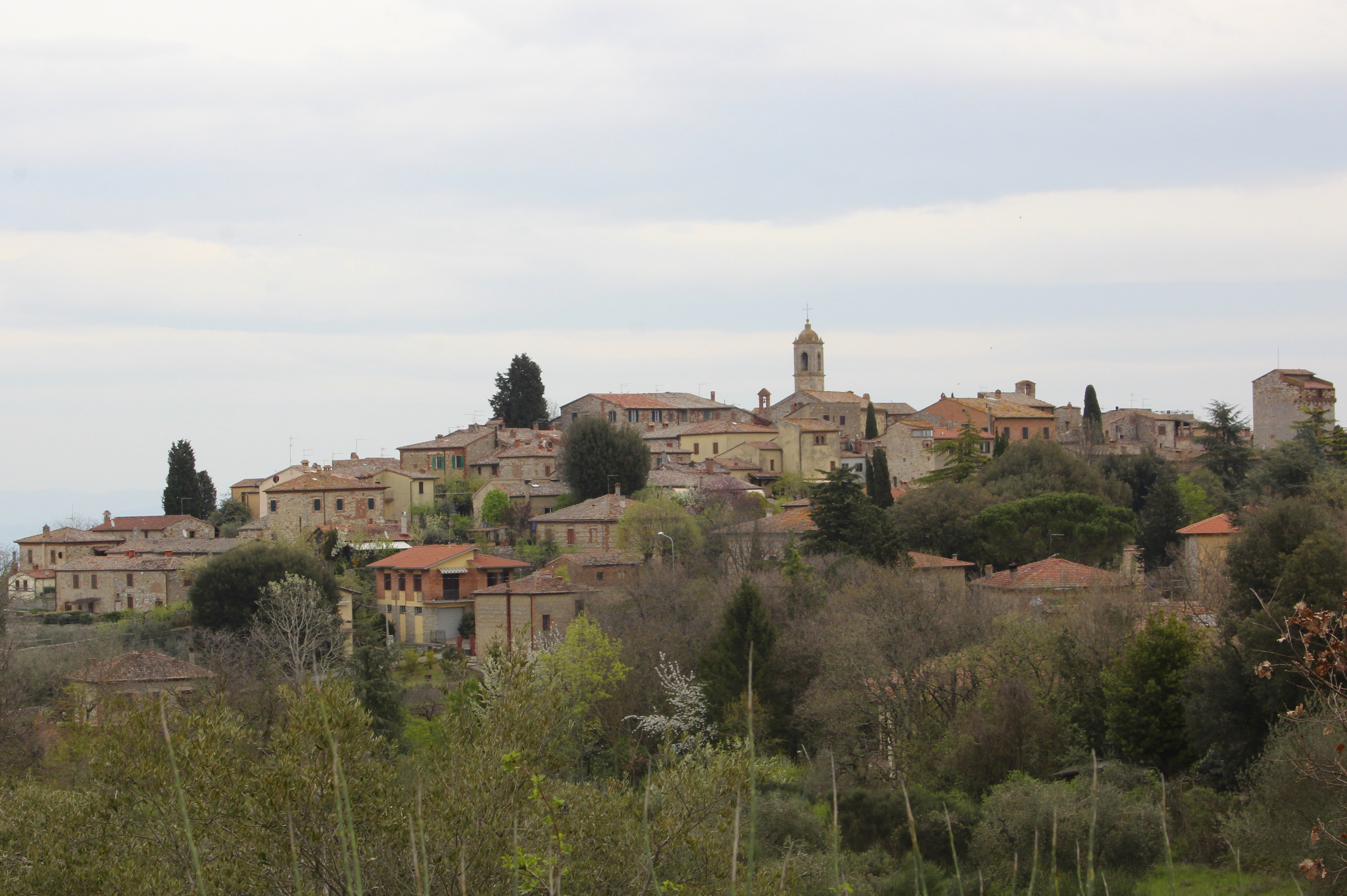
- View of Montefollonico

- Location of Montefollonico in Italy
- Coordinates: 43°7′40″N 11°44′46″E
- Country: Italy
- Region: Tuscany
- Province: Siena (SI)
- Comune: Torrita di Siena
- Elevation: 567 m (1,860 ft)

Population (2001)
  - Total: 480
- Demonym: Montefollonichesi
- Time zone: UTC+1 (CET)
  - Summer (DST): UTC+2 (CEST)

Montefollonico is a village in Tuscany, central Italy, administratively a frazione of the comune of Torrita di Siena, in the province of Siena. At the time of the 2001 census, its population was 149.

Montefollonico is about 60 km from Siena and 8 km from Torrita di Siena.
