= Valdichiana =

Valley in Italy

Coordinates: 43°15′N 11°49′E

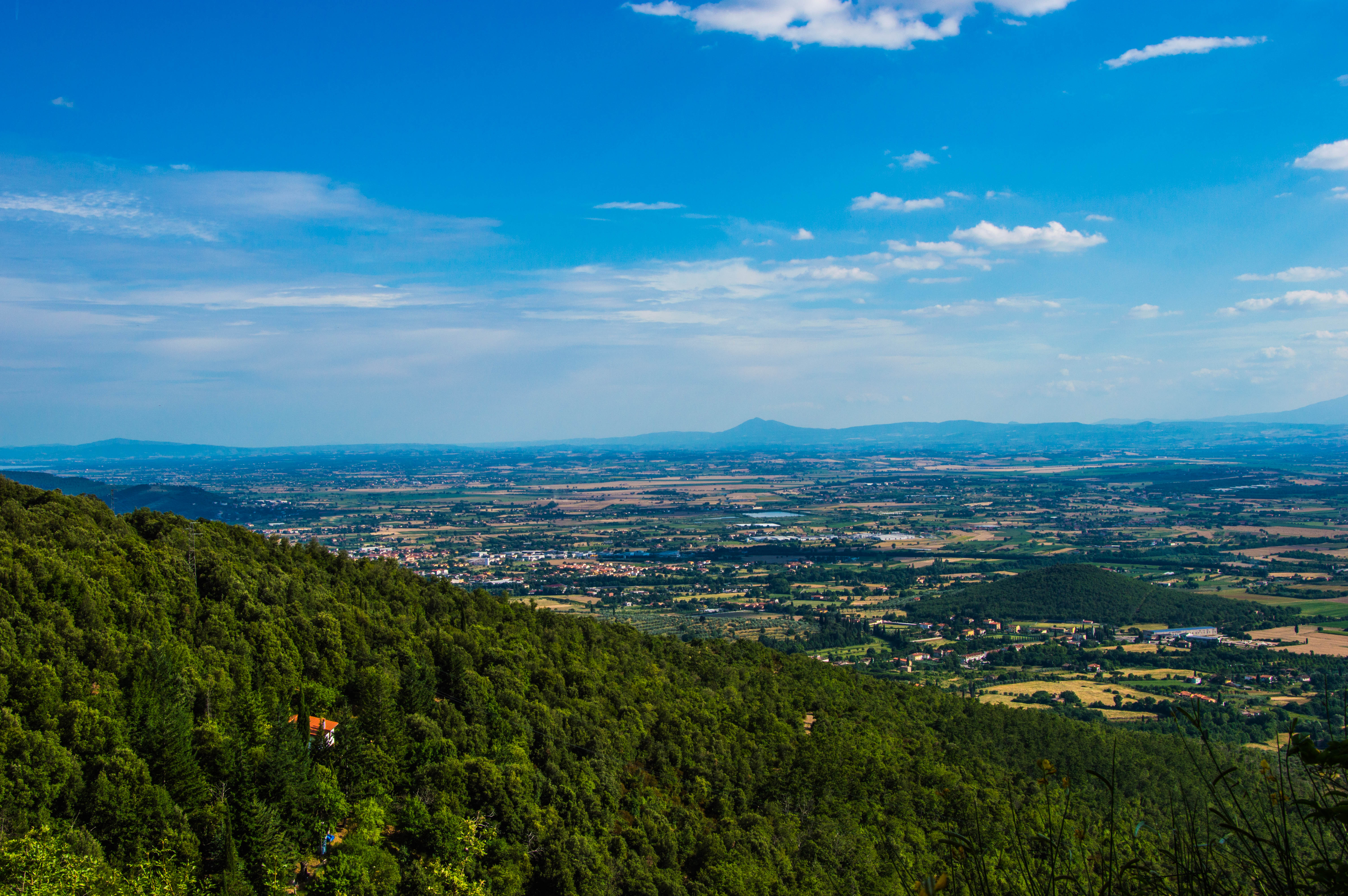
View of Valdichiana

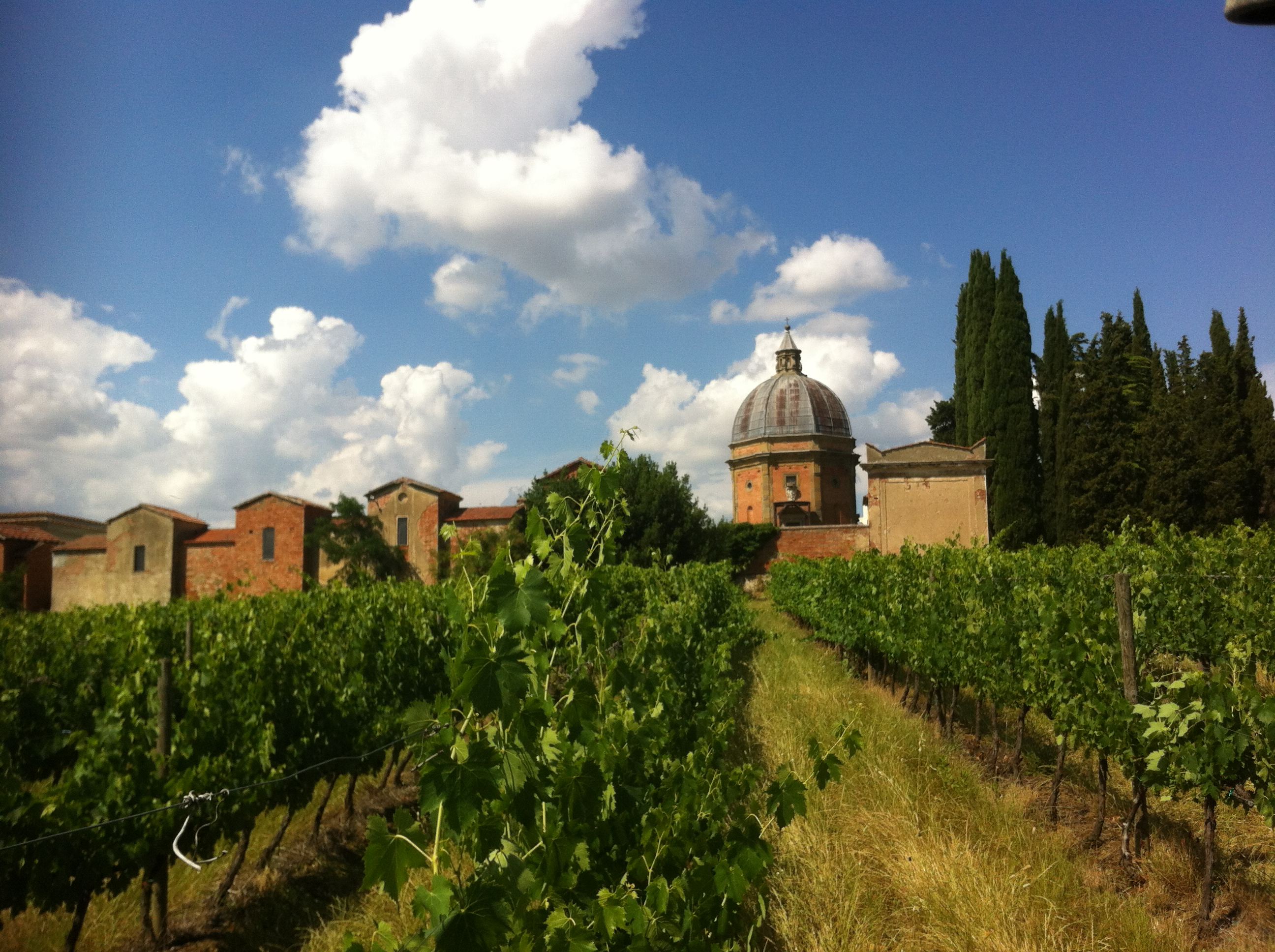
The temple was built by the Grand Duchy of Tuscany under Cosimo I de Medici on the plain of Scannagallo, in Foiano della Chiana, surrounded by the Fattoria Santa Vittoria vineyards.

The Val di Chiana, Valdichiana, or Chiana Valley, formerly Clanis Valley, is a tectonic valley of central Italy, whose valley floor consists of important alluvial residues filled up since the 11th century, lying on the territories of the provinces of Arezzo and Siena in Tuscany and the provinces of Perugia and Terni in Umbria.

== Morphological formation of the Clanis (Chiana) Valley ==
The valley, of tectonic origin with extension on the western side and compression on the eastern one, was mainly formed during the Miocene. In the Pliocene it was almost entirely submerged by the great Pliocene sea. Once it had withdrawn, in the upper Villafranchiano (about two million years ago) central Italy hosted large lakes, including that of the Chiana basin which was short-lived as it was drained (at the beginning of the Pleistocene) by the erosion of the hilly threshold of its waters, to take the form of a canyon crossed by a river, tributary of the waters of Lake Trasimeno (whose formation ended 110,000 years ago). During the Pleistocene, the Chiana valley was a tributary of the waters of the ancient Lake of Quarata (i.e. of the Arno) until 150,000 years ago, being along its course the Lake of Montepulciano and the Lake of Chiusi, very deep, whose hydrometric "zero" was located at a lower altitude (20-25 meters) than the current one. Its valley floor was very hollow in the centre, with a "V" shape due to western tectonic extension, eastern compression and progressive erosion determined by the transit of water towards the south, as evidenced by core samples and geological studies, even recent ones, and was furrowed by the so-called "Arno Tiberino" before that its waters were captured by the current riverbed towards Incisa and Florence.

About one hundred and fifty thousand years ago the Arno naturally found a new route (the current one towards Florence) following a landslide which caused the natural continuation of its body of water in that direction. The Etruscans probably filed a granite bottleneck along the course of the Arno, near Arezzo, to prevent the floods of the Arno from touching the (inhabited) plain of Arezzo and also the Clanis river whose bed was very hollow and had a slope sufficient to ensure the transport of solid components (245 MT above sea level in the plain of Chiani [west of Arezzo], to the north, and 110 MT above sea level in Ciconia (in the municipality of Orvieto) at the confluence of the Paglia river, to the south, over a distance of 104 km. The Clanis, a tributary of the Tiber, was navigable and through its bed the ancient Italic peoples and the Etruscans reached Rumon (Rome) and the Tyrrhenian Sea, and vice versa, navigable rivers being the "highways" and the main roads communication in the archaic age. The geological maps show that the alluvial residues, abundantly present in the valley floor, today completely filled and flat, date back to the late Holocene (geological period in which we live), being very recent. The underground waters of the valley follow the tectonic trend from North (Arezzo) to South (Tevere), while the direction of the surface waters has been modified by man in recent centuries. Human interventions have made the valley floor totally flat, between San Zeno (Arezzo) and Parrano (in the province of Terni), as well as raising the valley floor itself by several metres, making the Chiusi Scalo area the highest in the Val di Chiana with 250 mt s.l.v., with almost "zero" slope of the waters and with very high hydraulic and hydrogeological risks. From a geological point of view, the tectonic Chiana basin or "mother rock" is an inclined plane that starts from Chiani West of Arezzo (highest point) and reaches the Tiber near Orte (lowest point), incorporating the area of Trasimeno.

== Geography ==
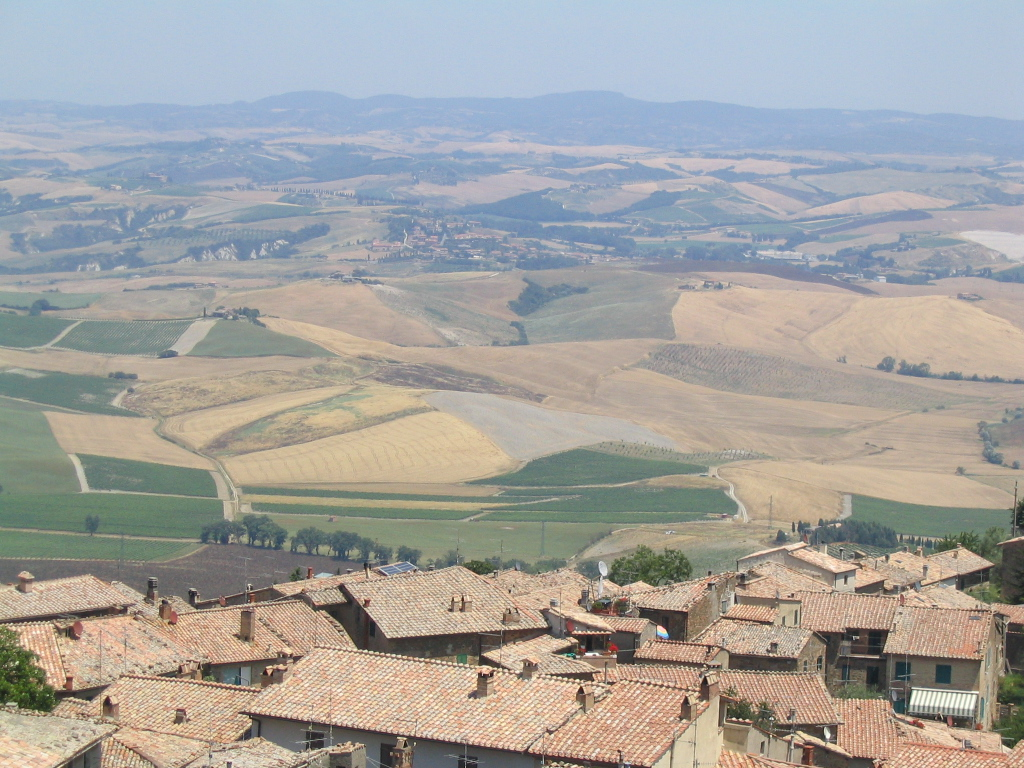
View of the Siena section of the Val di Chiana from Montepulciano

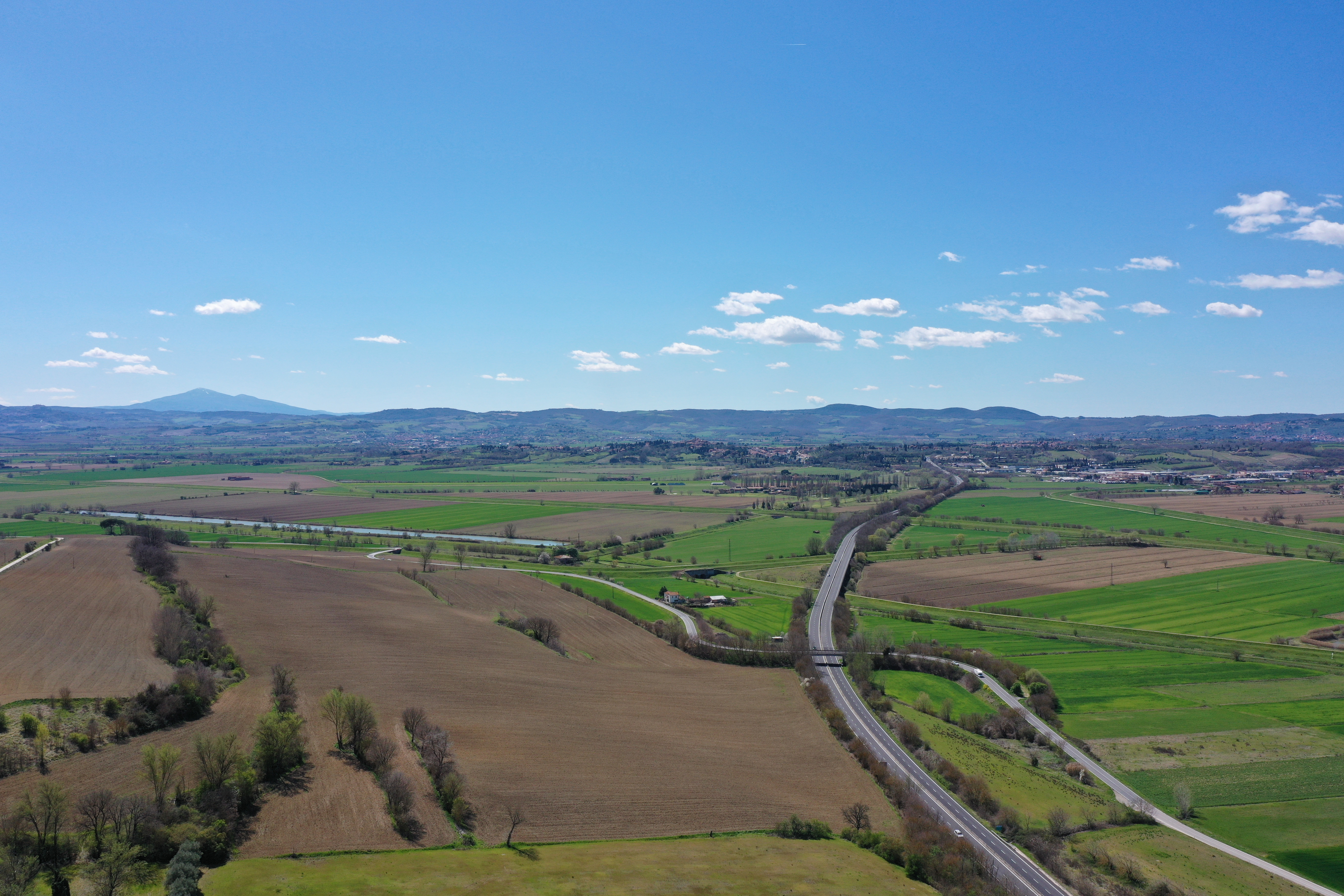
Raccordo autostradale RA6 ('Motorway connection 6') in Valdichiana

The actual Val di Chiana is about 104 kilometres (65 mi) long, and covers about 2,300 square kilometres (890 mi^{2}) valley floor. It runs north to south between the plain of Arezzo and the plain of Orvieto and includes the watershed of the Canale Maestro della Chiana, its main watercourse, and the northern part of the watershed of the Chiana River. It is divided into two hydrographic basins: the "Val di Chiana Toscana" (tributary of the Arno) and the "Val di Chiana Romana" (tributary of the Tiber), being the watershed located (since 1780) in Chiusi Scalo. The main watercourse of the Tuscan Val di Chiana is the Canale Maestro della Chiana, which receives the waters of the Val di Tresa, while the main watercourse of the Roman Val di Chiana is the Chiani (in its stretch initial called Chianetta canal, then Chiani torrent, then Chiani river).

From the Pleistocene to the middle of the 11th century the Clanis river was suitable for boats from Arezzo to the connection with the Tevere river (110 km). After the flooding of the Clanis Valley caused by a gigantic dam in 1052–1055, built on the orders of the Holy Roman Emperor and the German Pope Leo IX in the Orvieto area (located near the castle of Carnaiola), in 1338 the Republic of Florence ordered the people of Arezzo (just subdued) to build an artificial canal to drain the waters of the large artificial lake (so-called Chiana) towards the Arno, dug into the rock. This canal was initially 400 meters long, but the Republic of Florence ordered its extension, so as to drain ever greater quantities of water, drainage which however was hindered by the milling industry of the powerful Arezzo Monastery of Ss. Flora and Lucilla, which hindered the outflow of water with a 12 meters high dam, placed in the 19 meters deep channel. There is a map drawn by Leonardo da Vinci about this lake (Map RCIN 912278 Royal Collection). The beauty of the valley (whose waters flowed naturally from Arezzo to the Tiber) and the excellent farming activity was mentioned by Pliny the Elder in his Naturalis Historia (Book III, 52–54). Goethe a few centuries later wrote about Valdichiana in his Italian Journey:

"Fields of such beauty are impossible to find elsewhere; every lump of earth has been tilled to perfection, prepared for sowing. Wheat grows lushly on this soil, where it seems to find all the necessary conditions to thrive. Every other year they plant horsebean, because oat does not flourish here. They also plant lupines, now already green, which will ripen by the month of March. Flax too, is already sown; buried into the ground throughout the winter, it is toughened by the freezing cold."

To the northeast it is bounded by the Tuscan pre-Apennines crowned by the Alta Sant'Egidio at 1,057 metres (3,468 ft), monte Lignano at 837 metres (2,746 ft), and monte Corneta at 744 metres (2,441 ft). To the southeast, it reaches Lake Trasimeno and the valley of the Nestore River. To the west, it extends to the Val d'Orcia, where it reaches its highest elevation at 1,148 metres (3,766 ft) on (Monte Cetona).

The landscape is mostly hilly, with a plain around the Canale Maestro della Chiana. Its mean elevation is around 405 metres (1,329 ft).

== Products ==
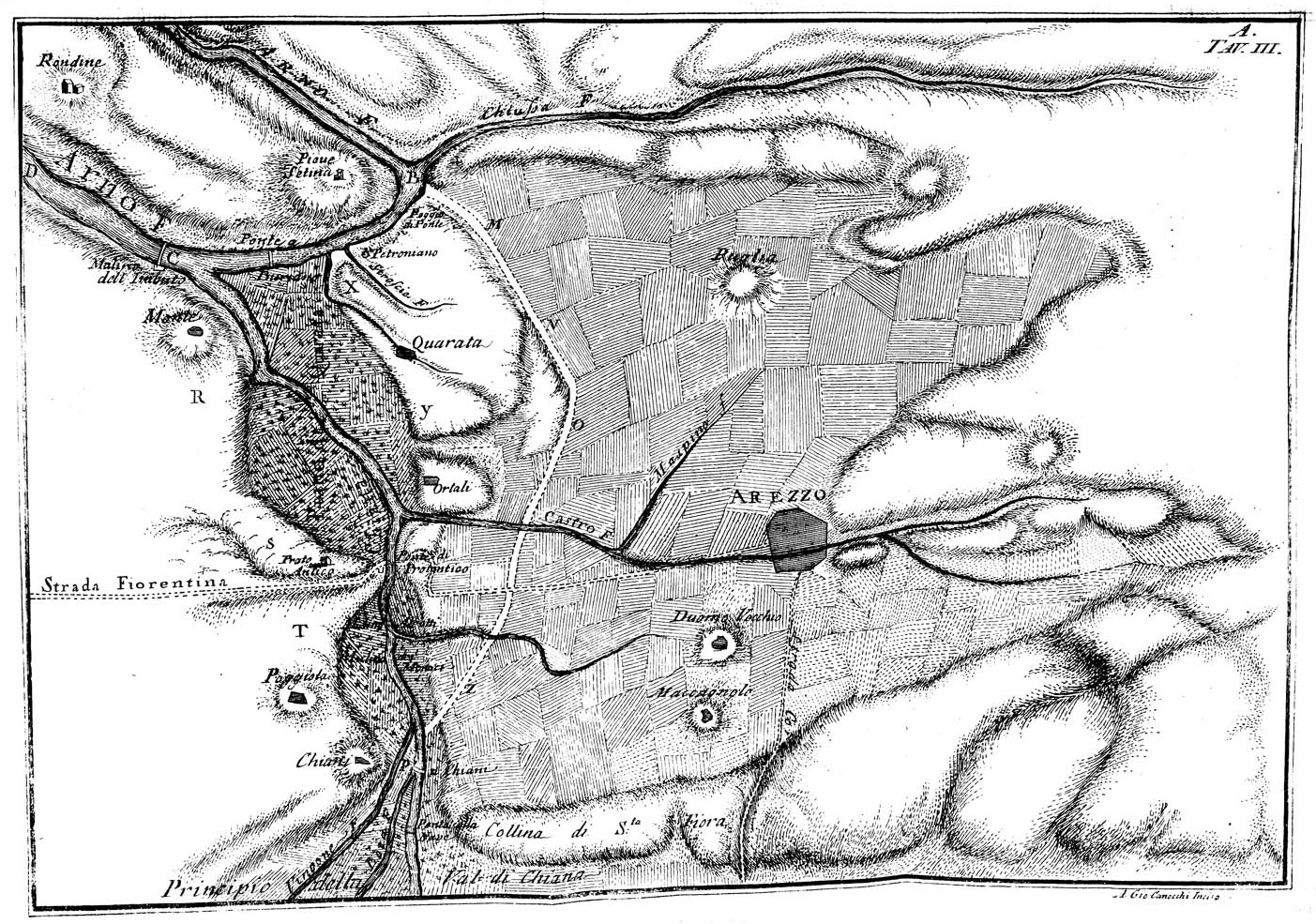
Val di Chiana 1789 map

Valdichiana is near traditional local products such as wines, local wheat variety, olive oil, truffle, fruit, cattle breed and others.

The most known local products are:

Chianina cattle breed, the original ingredient for the "Bistecca alla Fiorentina"

Aglione della Valdichiana. A special local giant garlic with an aromatic and gentle taste. From 2019 is a DOP

Vinsanto Valdichiana Toscana DOC

Grechetto Valdichiana Toscana DOC

== See also ==
- Chianina, a breed of cattle which originated in the valley
- Battle of Marciano or Scannagallo
- Foiano della Chiana's carnival - The oldest in Italy
- Tiber Valley
