= Farnetella =

- Frazione
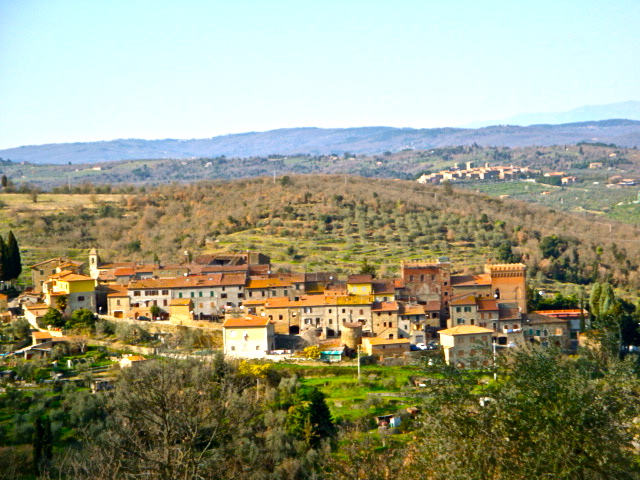
- View of Farnetella

- Location of Farnetella in Italy
- Coordinates: 43°14′35″N 11°42′5″E
- Country: Italy
- Region: Tuscany
- Province: Siena (SI)
- Comune: Sinalunga
- Elevation: 413 m (1,355 ft)

Population (2011)
  - Total: 94
- Demonym: Farnetellesi
- Time zone: UTC+1 (CET)
  - Summer (DST): UTC+2 (CEST)

Farnetella is a village in Tuscany, central Italy, administratively a frazione of the comune of Sinalunga, province of Siena. At the time of the 2001 census its population was 96.
