= Torrita di Siena =

- Comune
- Comune di Torrita di Siena
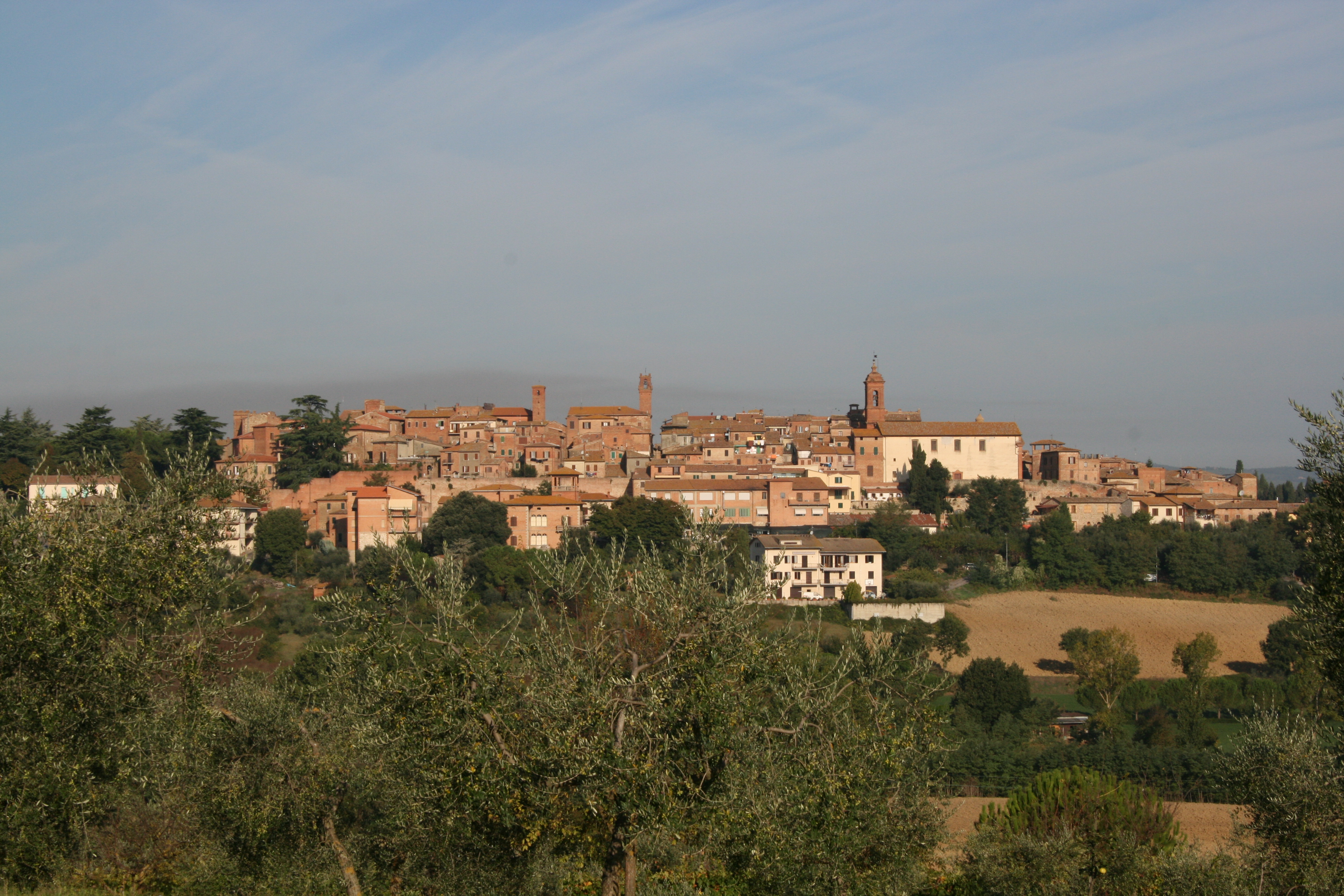
- Panorama of Torrita di Siena

- Coat of arms

- Location within Italy Location within Tuscany
- Coordinates: 43°10′N 11°46′E
- Country: Italy
- Region: Tuscany
- Province: Siena (SI)
- Frazioni: Montefollonico

Government
  - Mayor: Giacomo Grazi

Area
  - Total: 58.24 km^{2} (22.49 sq mi)
- Elevation: 325 m (1,066 ft)

Population (31 December 2014)
  - Total: 7,522
  - Density: 129.2/km^{2} (334.5/sq mi)
- Demonym: Torritesi
- Time zone: UTC+1 (CET)
  - Summer (DST): UTC+2 (CEST)
- Postal code: 53049
- Dialing code: 0577
- Website: Official website

Torrita di Siena is a comune (municipality) in the Province of Siena in the Italian region of Tuscany, located about 80 kilometres (50 miles) southeast of Florence and about 40 km (25 mi) southeast of Siena.

Torrita di Siena borders the following municipalities: Cortona, Montepulciano, Pienza, Sinalunga, Trequanda.

The most important event in Torrita di Siena is the "Palio dei Somari", a race among donkeys, which is run on Saint Joseph's Day (Torrita's patron saint) or the Sunday after this date.

== History ==
The name "Torrita" appears for the first time on a code dated 1037. The castle, subject to the sovereignty and defense of the Republic of Siena, was protected by a wall equipped with squared towers and four gates: Porta a Pago, Porta Gavina, Porta Nuova and Porta a Sole. It was an advanced Siena stronghold (castrum) during the fight against Montepulciano. Later, in 1554, it was conquered by Florence and it was subject since then to the power of the Medici.

Starting from the beginning of the 20th century, Torrita di Siena saw a big economic development, especially in woodcraft manufacturing.
