= Collegiata di San Martino =

Roman Catholic church in Tuscany, Italy

Coordinates: 43.2125°N 11.7365°E

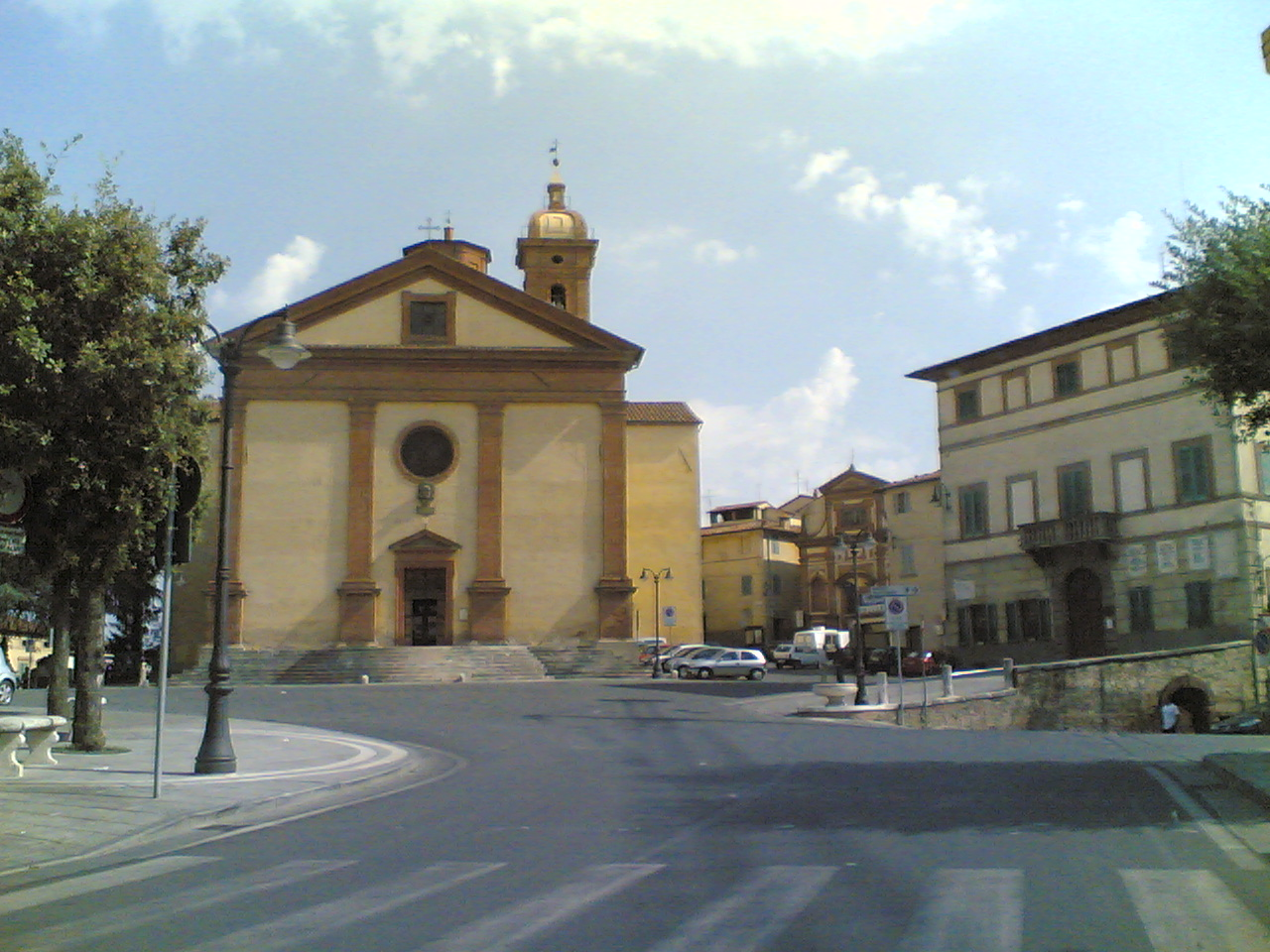
Facade

The Collegiata di San Martino is a Renaissance-style, Roman Catholic collegiate church in the center of Sinalunga, province of Siena, region of Tuscany, Italy. It is now part of the Diocese of Montepulciano-Chiusi-Pienza.

Located in a town hotly contested by Siena and Florence prior to the 16th century, the town's castle was razed after Florence defeated the Sienese forces during the Italian War of 1551–1559. The stones were reused to build the Collegiata in 1588.

Among the artworks in the church, some derived from the nearby old church of San Martino, later called Santa Croce; they include:

- Madonna and Child with Saints Martin and Sebastian by Benvenuto di Giovanni
- Madonna and Child with Saints by Il Sodoma
- Marriage of the Virgin (1612) by Rutilio Manetti
- St Catherine of Siena Introduces St Antony of Padua and Child Jesus to the Virgin (1650) by Francesco Nasini
- Saints Catherine of Siena, Dominic, Martin, Francis, Lucy, and Catherine of Alexandria (1697) by Giuseppe Nicola Nasini
