= Petroio =

- Frazione
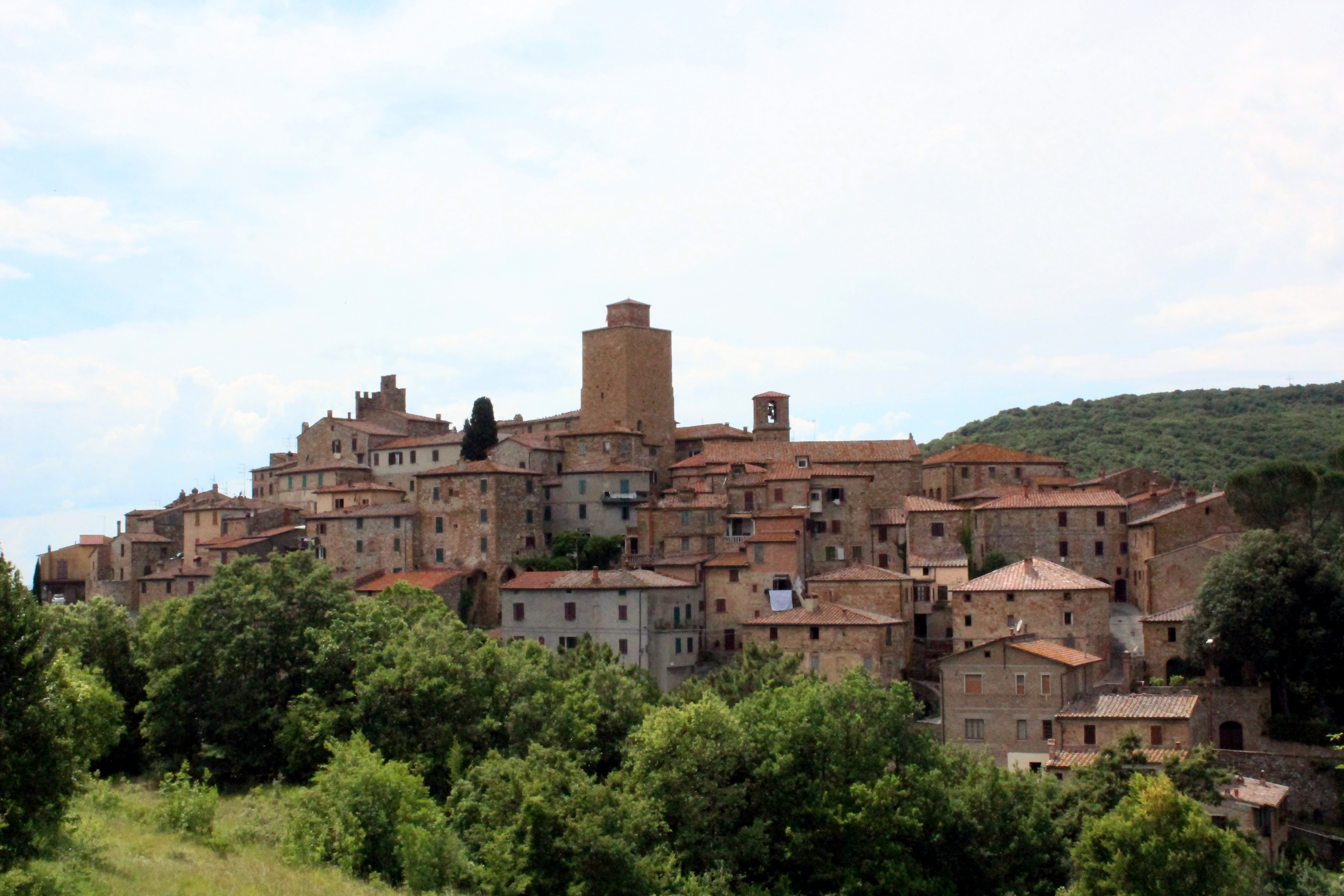
- View of Petroio

- Location of Petroio in Italy
- Coordinates: 43°8′43″N 11°41′17″E
- Country: Italy
- Region: Tuscany
- Province: Siena (SI)
- Comune: Trequanda
- Elevation: 447 m (1,467 ft)

Population (2011)
  - Total: 404
- Demonym: Petroiani
- Time zone: UTC+1 (CET)
  - Summer (DST): UTC+2 (CEST)

Petroio is a village in Tuscany, central Italy, administratively a frazione of the comune of Trequanda, province of Siena. At the time of the 2001 census its population was 335.

Petroio is about 50 km from Siena and 7 km from Trequanda.
