= Rigomagno =

- Frazione
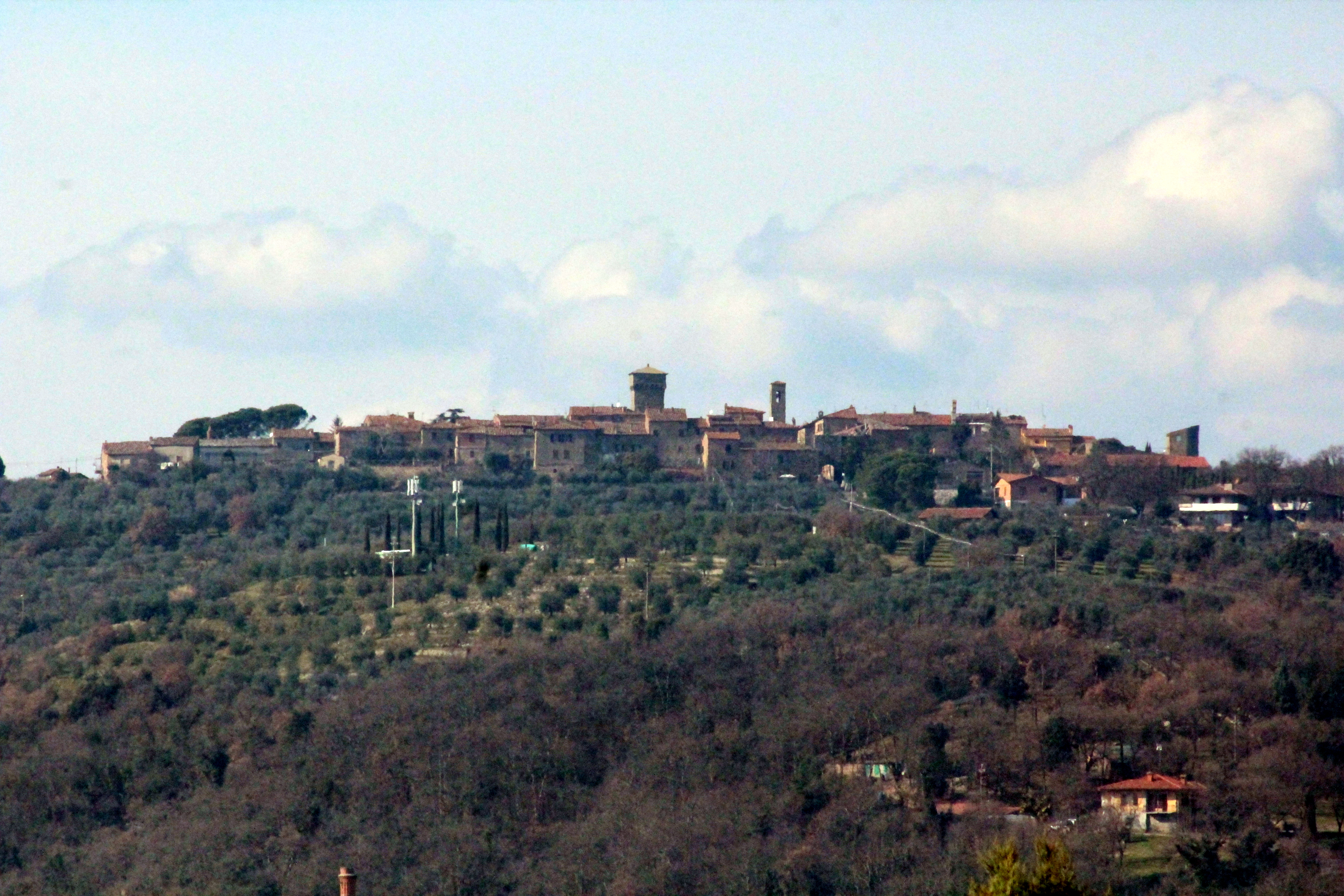
- Rigomagno

- Location of Rigomagno in Italy
- Coordinates: 43°15′44″N 11°41′48″E
- Country: Italy
- Region: Tuscany
- Province: Siena (SI)
- Comune: Sinalunga
- Elevation: 411 m (1,348 ft)

Population (2011)
  - Total: 151
- Demonym: Rigomagnesi
- Time zone: UTC+1 (CET)
  - Summer (DST): UTC+2 (CEST)

Rigomagno is a village in Tuscany, central Italy, administratively a frazione of the comune of Sinalunga, Province of Siena. At the time of the 2001 census its population was 144.
