= Bettolle =

- Village
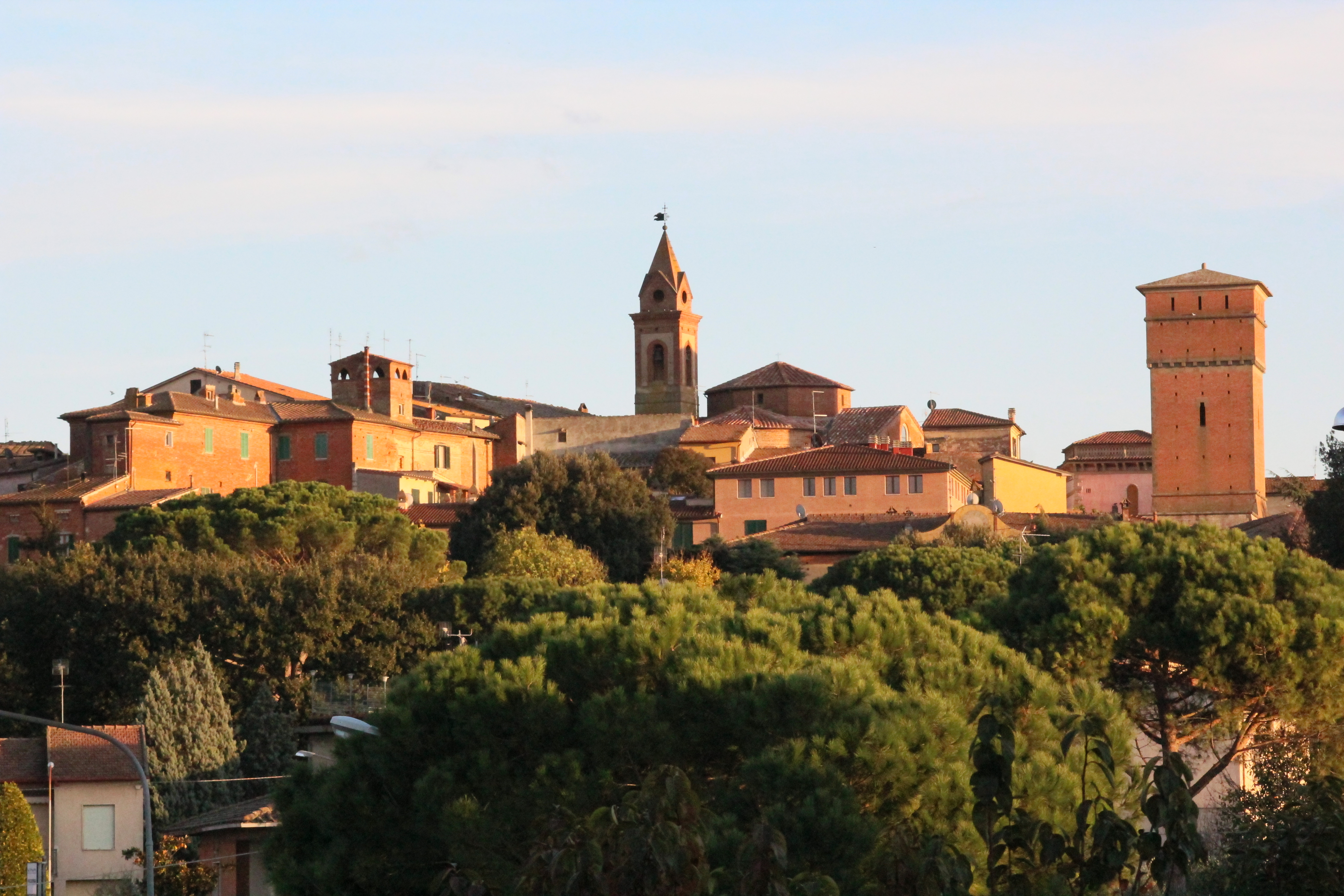

- Bettolle
- Coordinates: 43.2°N 11.8°E
- Country: Italy
- Region: Tuscany
- Province: Siena (SI)
- Comune: Sinalunga
- Time zone: UTC+1 (CET)
  - Summer (DST): UTC+2 (CEST)

Bettolle is a frazione of Sinalunga, in the province of Siena, Tuscany, Italy.

Of ancient origin, it was settled by the Etruscans, as attested by the numerous archaeological findings. In the Middle Ages it was a possession of the abbots of Farneta and of the lords of Sinalunga until, in 1226, it was acquired by the Republic of Siena. Together with the latter, it was conquered by the Grand Duchy of Tuscany in 1554.

The parish church of San Cristoforo is from 1014, but was later largely renovated. It houses five large 17th-century canvasses.
