= Sinalunga =

- Comune
- Comune di Sinalunga
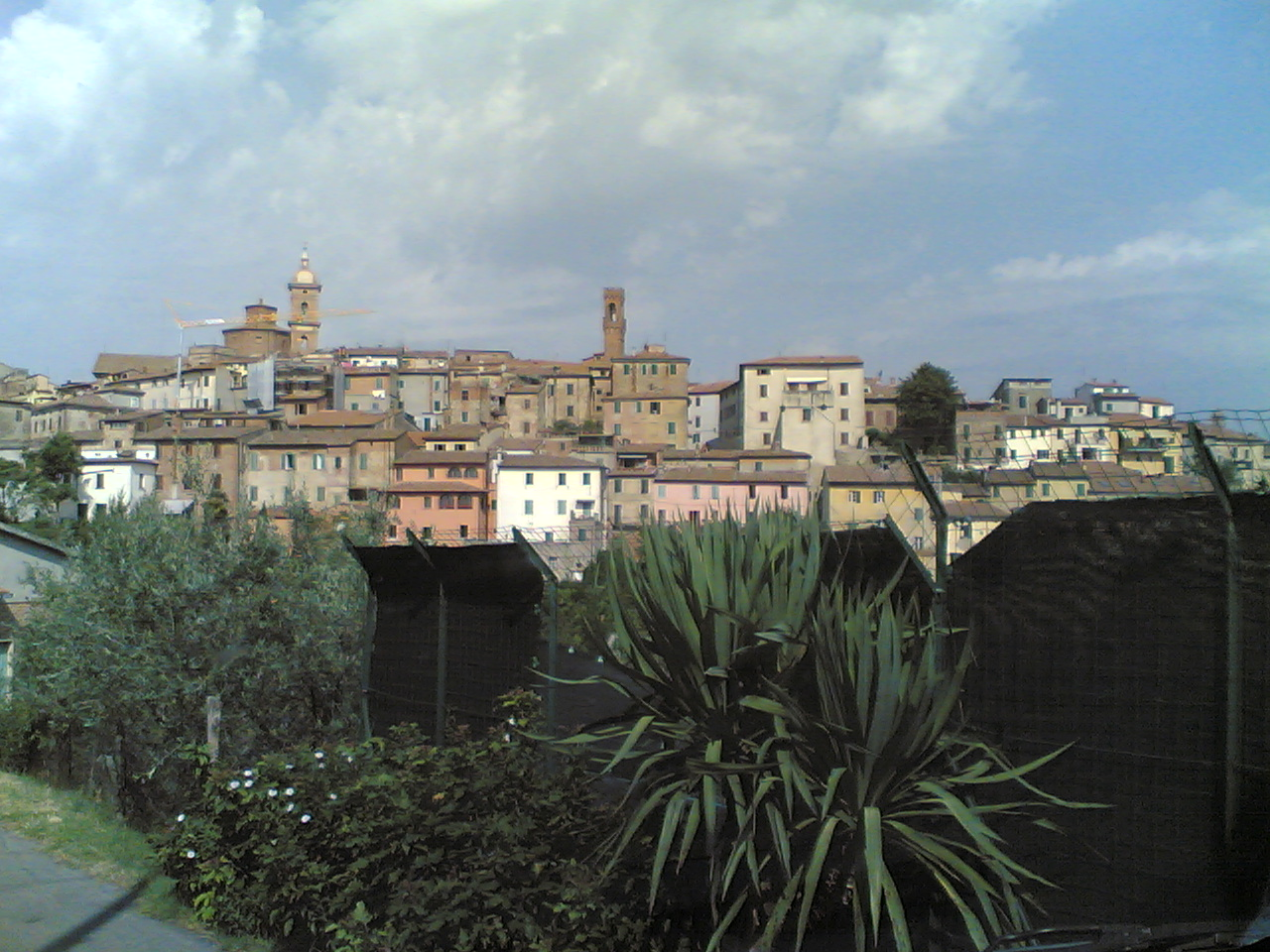

- Coat of arms

- Location within Italy Location within Tuscany
- Coordinates: 43°13′N 11°44′E
- Country: Italy
- Region: Tuscany
- Province: Siena (SI)
- Frazioni: Bettolle, Farnetella, Guazzino, Rigomagno, Scrofiano

Government
  - Mayor: Edo Zacchei

Area
  - Total: 78 km^{2} (30 sq mi)
- Elevation: 364 m (1,194 ft)

Population (31 December 2010)
  - Total: 12,926
  - Density: 170/km^{2} (430/sq mi)
- Demonym: Sinalunghesi
- Time zone: UTC+1 (CET)
  - Summer (DST): UTC+2 (CEST)
- Postal code: 53048
- Dialing code: 0577
- Patron saint: St. Martin
- Saint day: November 11
- Website: Official website

Sinalunga is a town and comune in the province of Siena, in the Tuscany region of central Italy.

== History ==
Aside from scanty prehistoric findings, the oldest historical remains date from the 8th century BC, when Sinalunga was perhaps an Etruscan settlement under the control of Chiusi, with some temple at the top of the hill where Sinalunga lies.

The current town grew up around the medieval castle called Castello delle Ripe, attracting people on the hill after the Etruscan land reclamation works in the area were gradually abandoned. Asinalonga is mentioned for the first time in the 8th century. The town was later under the Cacciaconti family, who became subjects of the commune of Siena in 1197.

== Main sights ==
- Palazzo Pretorio, built between 1337 and 1346. It was the centre of the civil power in the town, as attested by the podestà and Medici crests on its facade.
- Collegiata di San Martino (16th century), built from 1568 over the ancient castle. The interior, on the Latin cross, has works by Benvenuto di Giovanni, Il Sodoma and Rutilio Manetti
- Church of Santa Lucia (erected in 1278), now used as auditorium.
- Church of Santa Croce (15th century). It houses the Wedding of the Virgin by Luca Signorelli.
- Church of San Pietro ad Mensulas, built in the 4th century on a pre-existing Roman edifice, probably the main station on the Via Cassia.
- Church of Santa Maria delle Nevi
- Church and Convent of San Bernardino

== Twin cities ==
- Aÿ-Champagne, France
- Dorking, United Kingdom
