= Autostrada A5 (Italy) =

Controlled-access highway in Italy

Autostrada A5
- Italian: Autostrada della Valle d'Aosta; French: Autoroute de la Vallée d'Aoste; Aosta Valley motorway

Route information
- Part of E25, E64 and E612
- Maintained by ANAS
- Length: 143.4 km (89.1 mi)
- Existed: 1961–present

Major junctions
- South end: Turin
- A4 in Turin; A55 in Turin
- West end: Mont Blanc Tunnel

Location
- Country: Italy
- Regions: Piedmont, Aosta Valley

Highway system
- Roads in Italy; Autostrade; State; Regional; Provincial; Municipal
← A 4	→ A 6

The Autostrada A5 or Autostrada della Valle d'Aosta ("Aosta Valley motorway"), in French Autoroute de la Vallée d'Aoste, is an autostrada (Italian for "motorway") in Italy located in the regions of Piedmont and Aosta Valley, which connects Turin to France via Ivrea and Aosta, through the Mont Blanc Tunnel. It is a part of the E25, E64 and E612 European routes.

Ranked among the most advanced motorways in the country, as it is equipped with special heating systems to prevent the formation of ice on the road surface, it is 143.4 kilometres (89.1 mi) long and is the most expensive motorway in Italy.

== Major cities ==
Autostrada A5 passes through Volpiano, Ivrea, Pont-Saint-Martin, Châtillon, Aosta and Courmayeur.

== Route ==
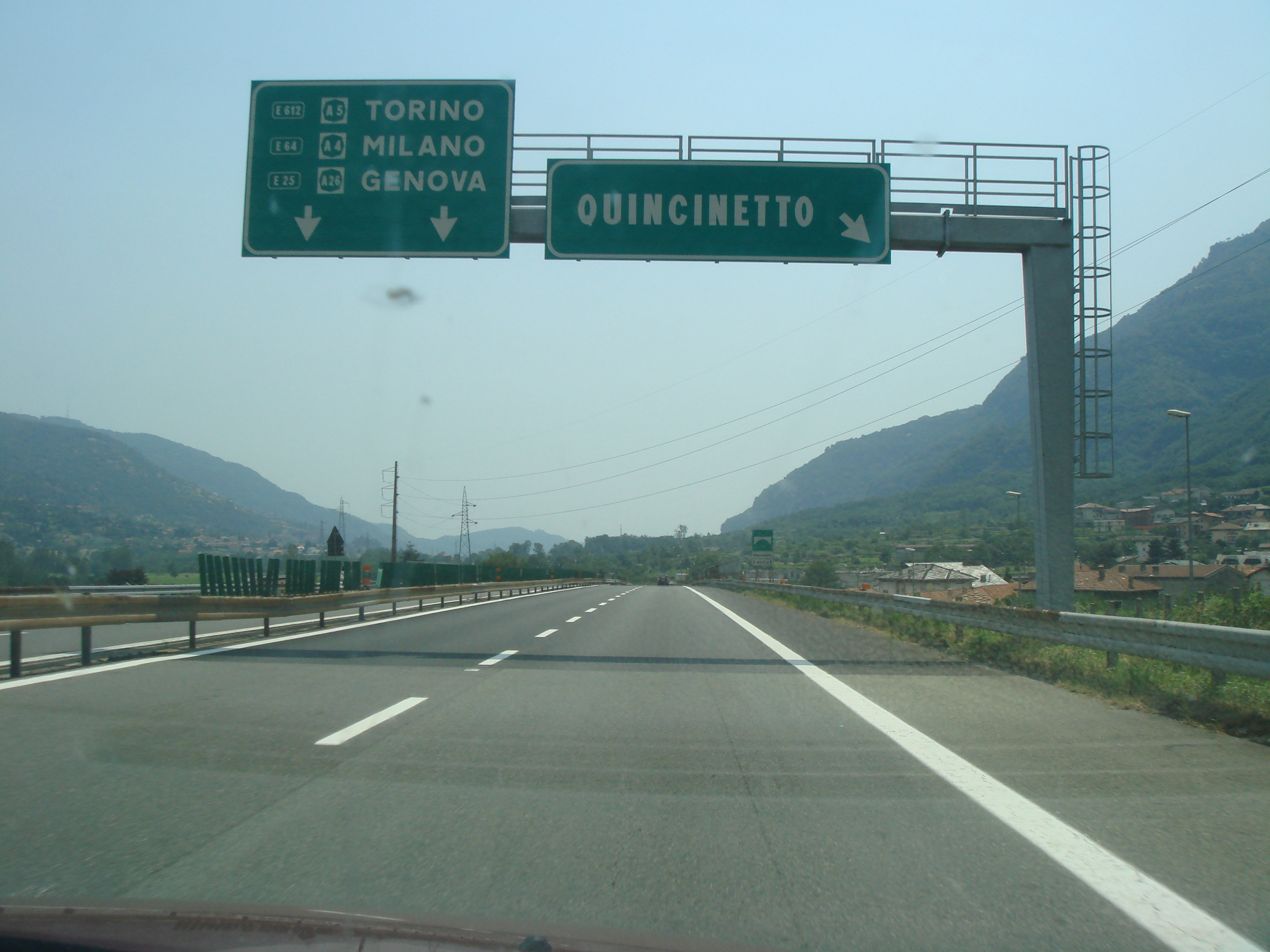
Autostrada A5 near Quincinetto

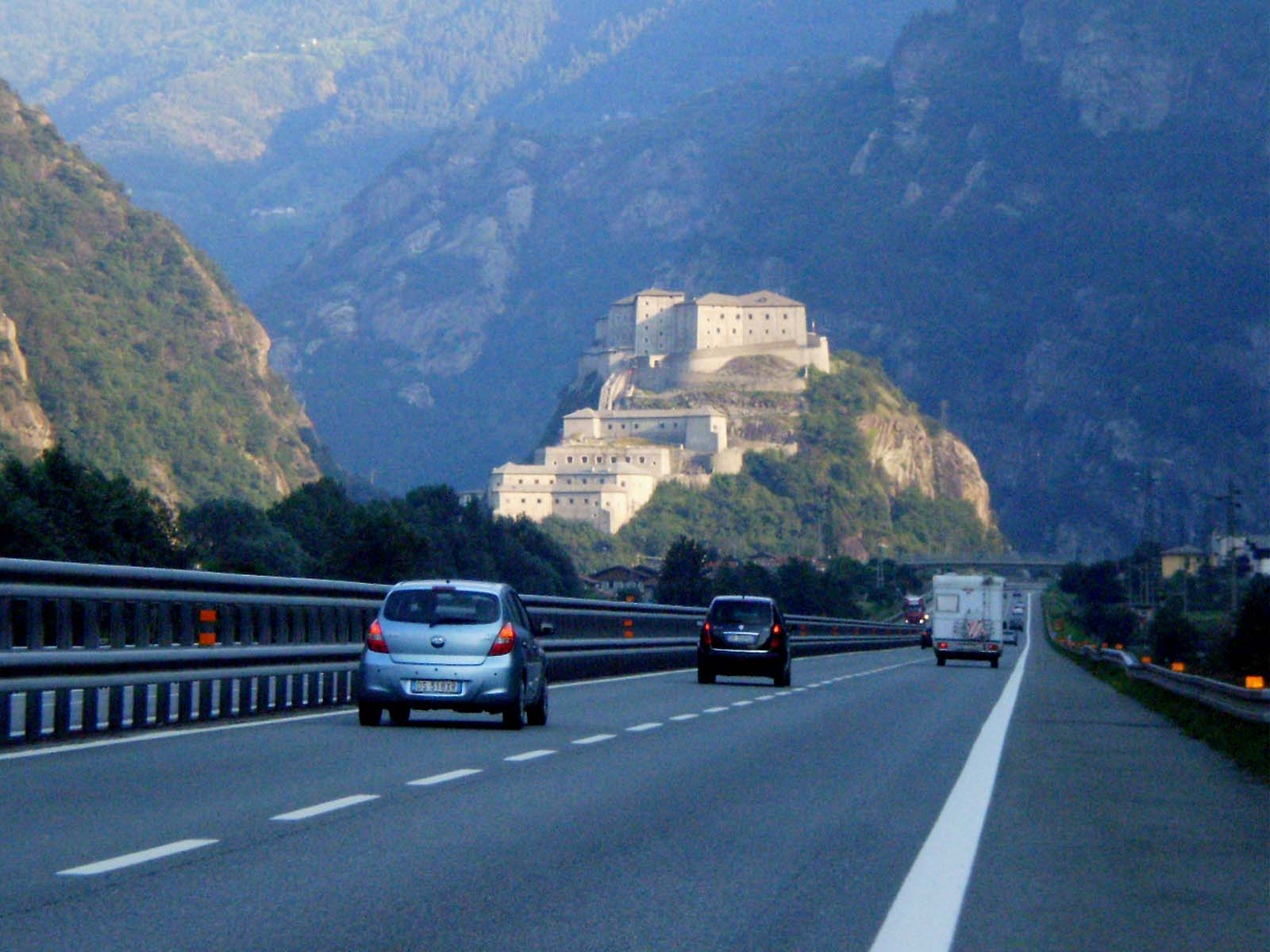
Autostrada A5 near Bard

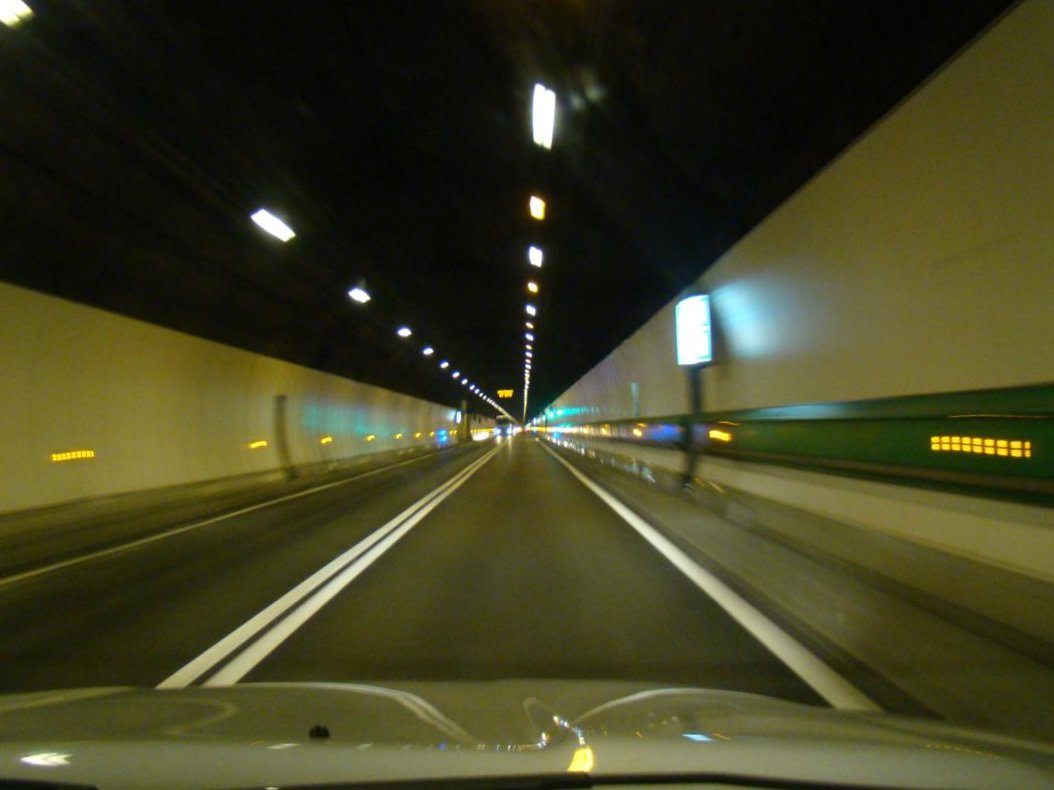
Mont-Blanc Tunnel

TURIN - AOSTA - MONT BLANC; Autostrada della Valle d'Aosta
Exit	↓km↓	↑km↑	Province	European Route
Turin C.so Giulio Cesare	0.0 km (0 mi)	143.4 km (89.1 mi)	TO	E64; E612
Turin - Trieste tangenziale di Torino; Turin Abbadia di Stura; Turin Airport; Padana Superiore	1.6 km (0.99 mi)	141.8 km (88.1 mi)	TO	E612
Settimo Torinese	3.8 km (2.4 mi)	139.6 km (86.7 mi)	TO	E612
Toll gate Turin nord	4.0 km (2.5 mi)	139.4 km (86.6 mi)	TO	E612
Volpiano	11.0 km (6.8 mi)	132.4 km (82.3 mi)	TO	E612
San Giorgio Canavese	25.0 km (15.5 mi)	118.4 km (73.6 mi)	TO	E612
Scarmagno	33.0 km (20.5 mi)	110.4 km (68.6 mi)	TO	E612
Rest area "Scarmagno"	35.0 km (21.7 mi)	108.4 km (67.4 mi)	TO	E612
Diramazione Ivrea - Santhià; Turin - Trieste; Genoa - Gravellona Toce	37.0 km (23.0 mi)	106.4 km (66.1 mi)	TO	E25; E612
Ivrea	40.0 km (24.9 mi)	103.4 km (64.2 mi)	TO	E25; E612
Quincinetto	53.0 km (32.9 mi)	90.4 km (56.2 mi)	TO	E25
Pont-Saint-Martin	58.0 km (36.0 mi)	85.4 km (53.1 mi)	AO	E25
Verrès	70.0 km (43.5 mi)	73.4 km (45.6 mi)	AO	E25
Châtillon - Saint-Vincent	81.5 km (50.6 mi)	61.9 km (38.5 mi)	AO	E25
Rest area "Châtillon - Saint-Vincent"	81.6 km (50.7 mi)	61.8 km (38.4 mi)	AO	E25
Nus	93.0 km (57.8 mi)	50.4 km (31.3 mi)	AO	E25
Rest area "Les Îles de Brissogne" (Note: Only in the direction of Aosta)	99.0 km (61.5 mi)	44.4 km (27.6 mi)	AO	E25
Toll gate Aosta / Aoste	101.0 km (62.8 mi)	42.4 km (26.3 mi)	AO	E25
Aosta est / Aosta est del Gran S. Bernardo / du Grand-St-Bernard; Traforo del Gran S. Bernardo / Tunnel du Grand-St-Bernard; Italy–Switzerland border	101.0 km (62.8 mi)	42.4 km (26.3 mi)	AO	E25
Rest area "Autoporto / Autoport" (Note: Only in the direction of Turin)	102.0 km (63.4 mi)	41.4 km (25.7 mi)	AO	E25
Aosta ovest / Aoste ouest - Saint-Pierre	113.0 km (70.2 mi)	30.4 km (18.9 mi)	AO	E25
Morgex	131.0 km (81.4 mi)	12.4 km (7.7 mi)	AO	E25
Courmayeur	139.0 km (86.4 mi)	4.4 km (2.7 mi)	AO	E25
Traforo del Monte Bianco / Tunnel du Mont-Blanc; France–Italy border	143.4 km (89.1 mi)	0.0 km (0 mi)	AO	E25

=== A4/A5 Ivrea-Santhià connection ===
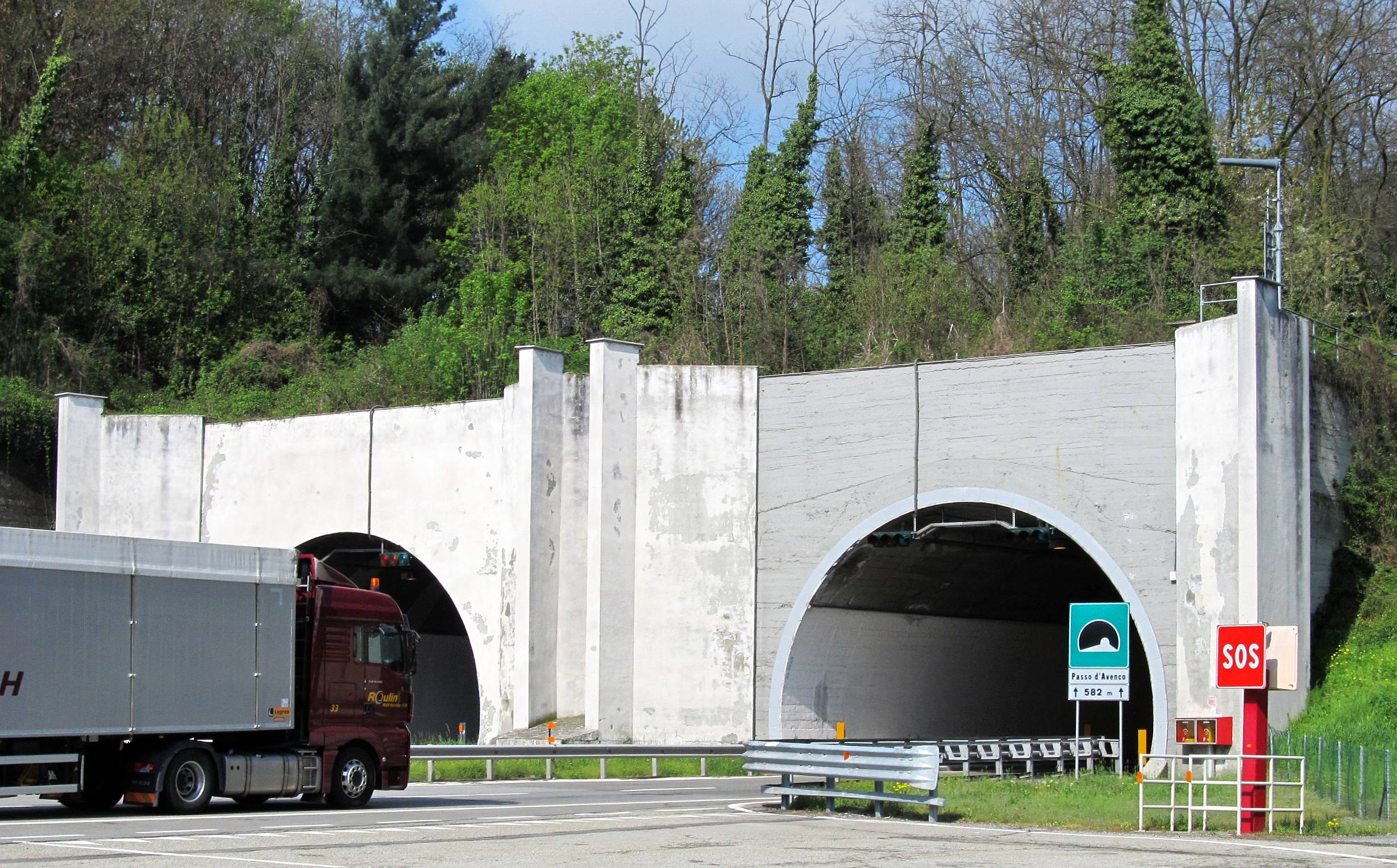
A4/A5 Ivrea-Santhià connection: Avenco pass tunnel

AUTOSTRADA A4/A5; Ivrea-Santhià connection
Exit	↓km↓	↑km↑	Province	European route
Turin - Aosta - Mont Blanc	0.0 km (0 mi)	23.6 km (14.7 mi)	TO	E25
Albiano ex del Lago di Viverone - Ivrea	7.9 km (4.9 mi)	15.7 km (9.8 mi)	TO	E25
Rest area "Viverone"	13.0 km (8.1 mi)	10.6 km (6.6 mi)	TO	E25
Turin - Milan; Santhià	23.5 km (14.6 mi)	0.1 km (0.062 mi)	VC	E25
Diramazione Stroppiana - Santhià; Genoa - Gravellona Toce	23.6 km (14.7 mi)	0.0 km (0 mi)	VC	E25

=== A5-SS 27 connection ===
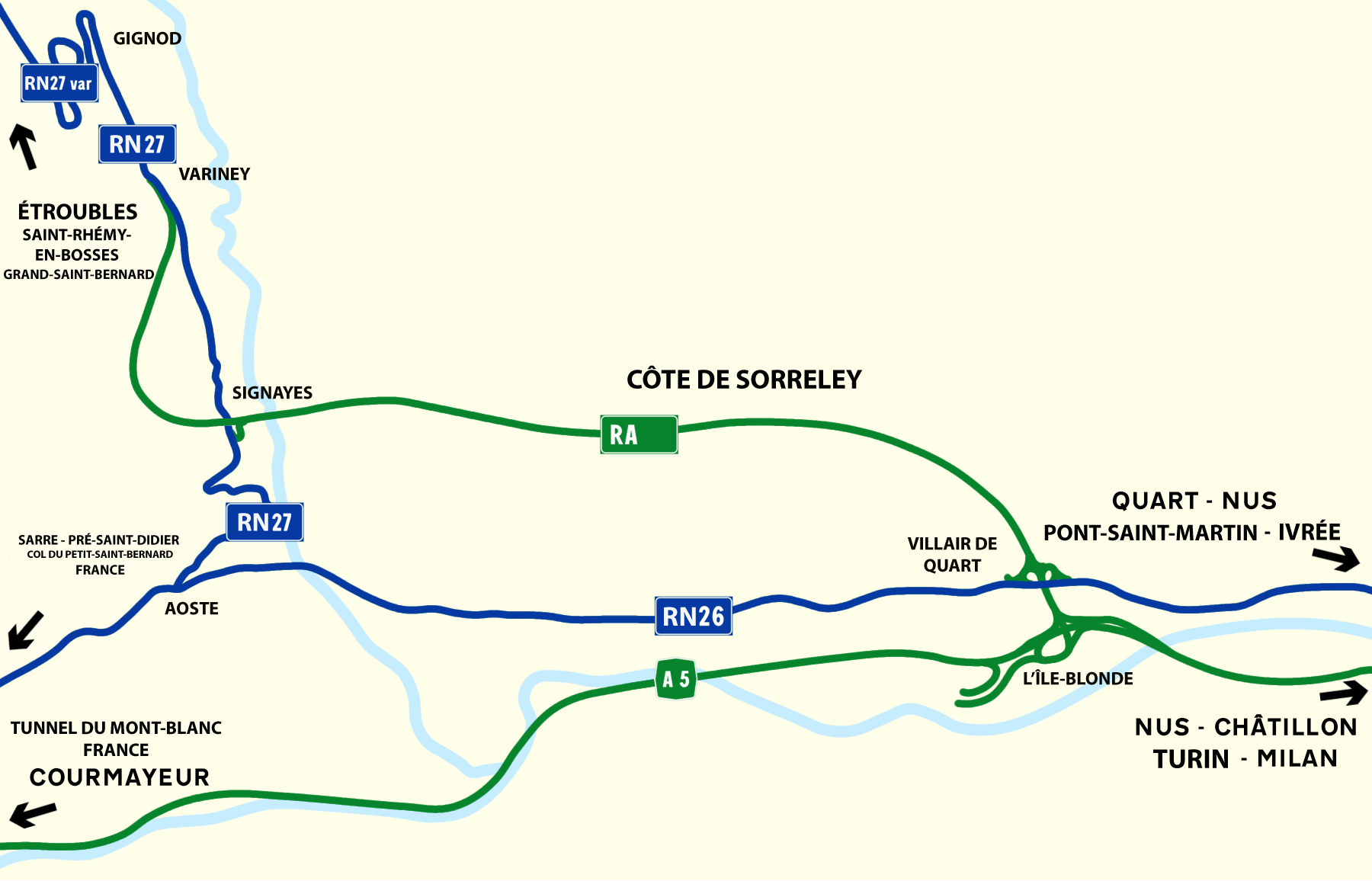
Map of the motorway link between RN26, RN27 and the A5

RACCORDO A5-SS 27; A5-SS 27 connection
Exit	↓km↓	↑km↑	Province
Turin - Aosta - Mont Blanc	0.0 km (0 mi)	7.9 km (4.9 mi)	AO
del Gran San Bernardo	6.1 km (3.8 mi)	1.8 km (1.1 mi)	AO
del Gran San Bernardo Great St Bernard Tunnel; Italy–Switzerland border	7.9 km (4.9 mi)	0.0 km (0 mi)	AO

== See also ==
- Autostrade of Italy
- Roads in Italy
- Transport in Italy

=== Other Italian roads ===
- State highways (Italy)
- Regional road (Italy)
- Provincial road (Italy)
- Municipal road (Italy)
