= Autostrada A4 (Italy) =

Controlled-access highway in Italy

Autostrada A4
- Autostrada Serenissima; Serenissima motorway

Route information
- Part of E55, E64 and E70
- Maintained by ANAS
- Length: 523.1 km (325.0 mi)
- Existed: 1927–present

Major junctions
- West end: Turin
- A55 in Turin; A5 in Borgo d'Ale; A26 in Greggio; A50 and A52 in Rho; A8 in Pero; A51 in Carugate; A58 in Agrate Brianza; A35 in Ospitaletto; A21 in Brescia; A22 in Verona; A31 in Vicenza; A13 in Padua; A57 in Venice; A27 in Preganziol; A28 in Santo Stino di Livenza; A23 in San Giorgio di Nogaro; A34 in Palmanova; RA13 in Sistiana
- East end: Trieste

Location
- Country: Italy
- Regions: Piedmont, Lombardy, Veneto, Friuli-Venezia Giulia

Highway system
- Roads in Italy; Autostrade; State; Regional; Provincial; Municipal
← A 3	→ A 5

The Autostrada A4, or Autostrada Serenissima ("Serenissima motorway"), is an autostrada (Italian for "motorway") 523.1 kilometres (325.0 mi) long in Italy located in the regions of Piedmont, Lombardy, Veneto and Friuli-Venezia Giulia which connects Turin and Trieste via Milan and Venice crossing the entire Po Valley from west to east.

The city of Venice (or rather, Mestre, a mainland frazione of Venice) originally formed a bottleneck on the A4, but is now bypassed by the Passante di Mestre (the old route through Mestre was renumbered A57). The A4 passes just north of the city of Milan, where it is toll-free. It is a part of the E55, E64 and E70 European routes.

== Overview ==
Due to the different companies that manage the different parts of the motorway, it is often referred to as formed by five sections: Turin-Milan, Milan-Brescia, Brescia-Padua, Padua-Venice and Venice-Trieste. As it runs through the whole Pianura Padana, which is a densely populated and highly industrialized area, the A4 is one of the busiest motorways in Italy.

Before World War II, three sections of the motorway were built: Turin-Milan, Milan-Brescia and Padua-Venice. The first section built was Milan-Bergamo, which opened on 24 September 1927, being just the second motorway to open, following the Autostrada dei Laghi in 1924/25. On 29 August 1931, it was extended to Brescia. On 25 October 1932, the Turin-Milan section opened, and on 15 October 1933, the Padua-Venice section.

The two sections became connected on 10 February 1962, when the Brescia-Padua section opened. The Venice-Trieste section was opened on 22 February 1970. The original road through Mestre, now designated A57 and named "Tangenziale di Mestre", opened on 3 September 1972.

A4 is a dual-carriageway, six-lane motorway for most of its length. The stretch between Milano Est tollgate and Bergamo has been an eight-lane motorway since 30 September 2007. The stretch from Venice to Trieste is instead still a four-lane motorway, but it is planned to upgrade this stretch over motorway to six lanes.

== Operators ==
- Turin-Milan: SATAP
- Milan-Brescia: Autostrade per l'Italia (a subsidiary of Atlantia)
- Brescia-Padua: A4 Holding (a subsidiary of Abertis)
- Padua-Venice: Concessioni Autostradali Venete (since 2009; ANAS and Veneto Region joint venture)
- Venice-Trieste: Società Autostrade Alto Adriatico

== Passante di Mestre ==
The route of the "Passante di Mestre" (marked in blue) and the Venice-Mestre motorway system

The passante di Mestre is a part of the A4 motorway, opened to traffic on 8 February 2009. The objective of the route is to reduce the volume of auto- and truck-based traffic passing through Mestre (a mainland frazione of Venice) to reach non-local destinations like Austria, Slovenia and other Eastern European countries.

The new includes three lanes plus one emergency lane. Each lane measures 3.75 metres (12.3 ft) apart from the emergency lane which measures only 3 metres (9.8 ft), and the new stretch of motorway totals 32.3 kilometres (20.1 mi).

== Major cities ==
Autostrada A4 Passes through Turin, Settimo Torinese, Novara, Cusano Milanino, Cinisello Balsamo, Monza, Bergamo, Brescia, Verona, Vicenza, and Padua.

== Route ==
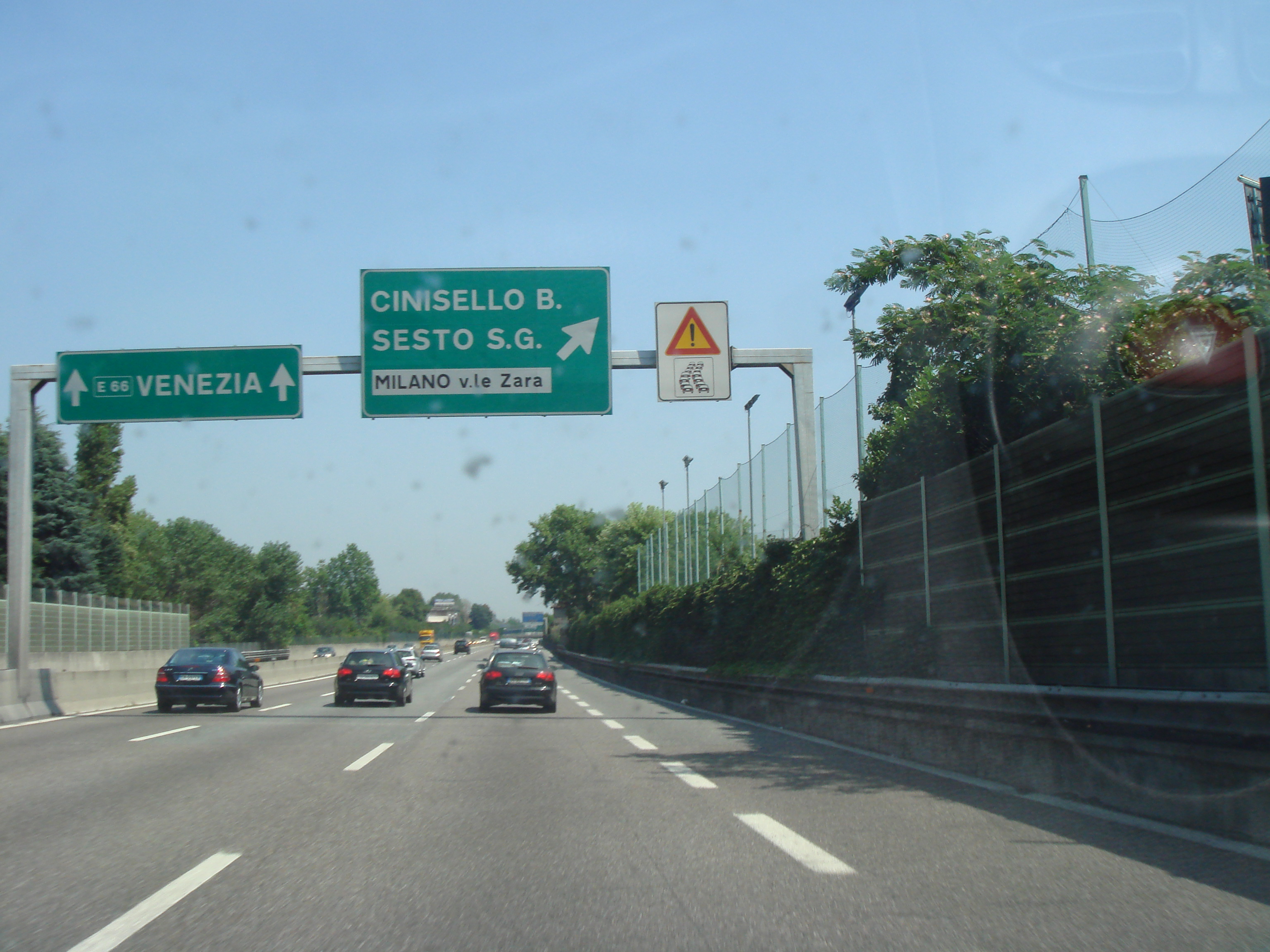
Autostrada A4 near Milan

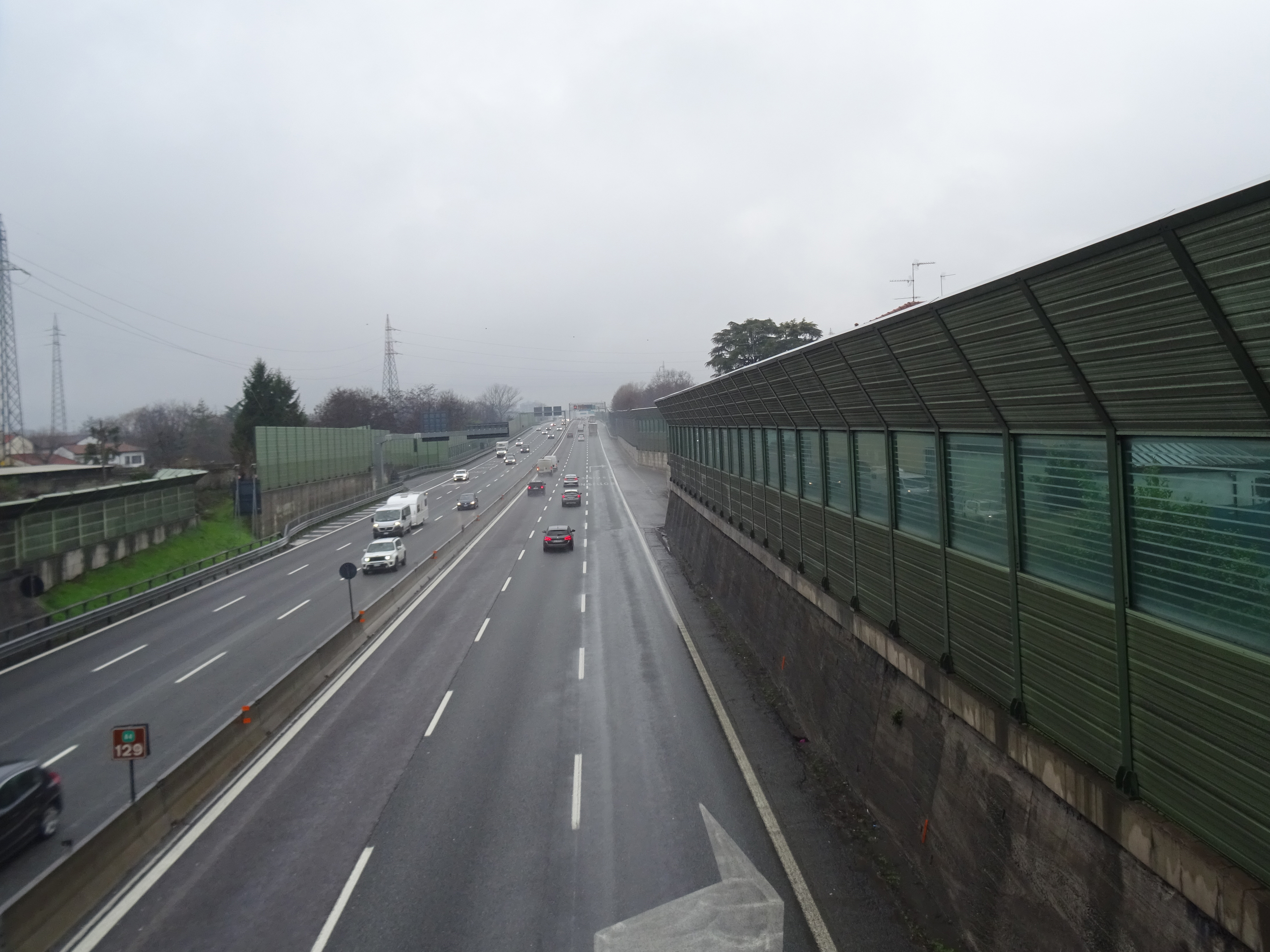
Autostrada A4 near Monza

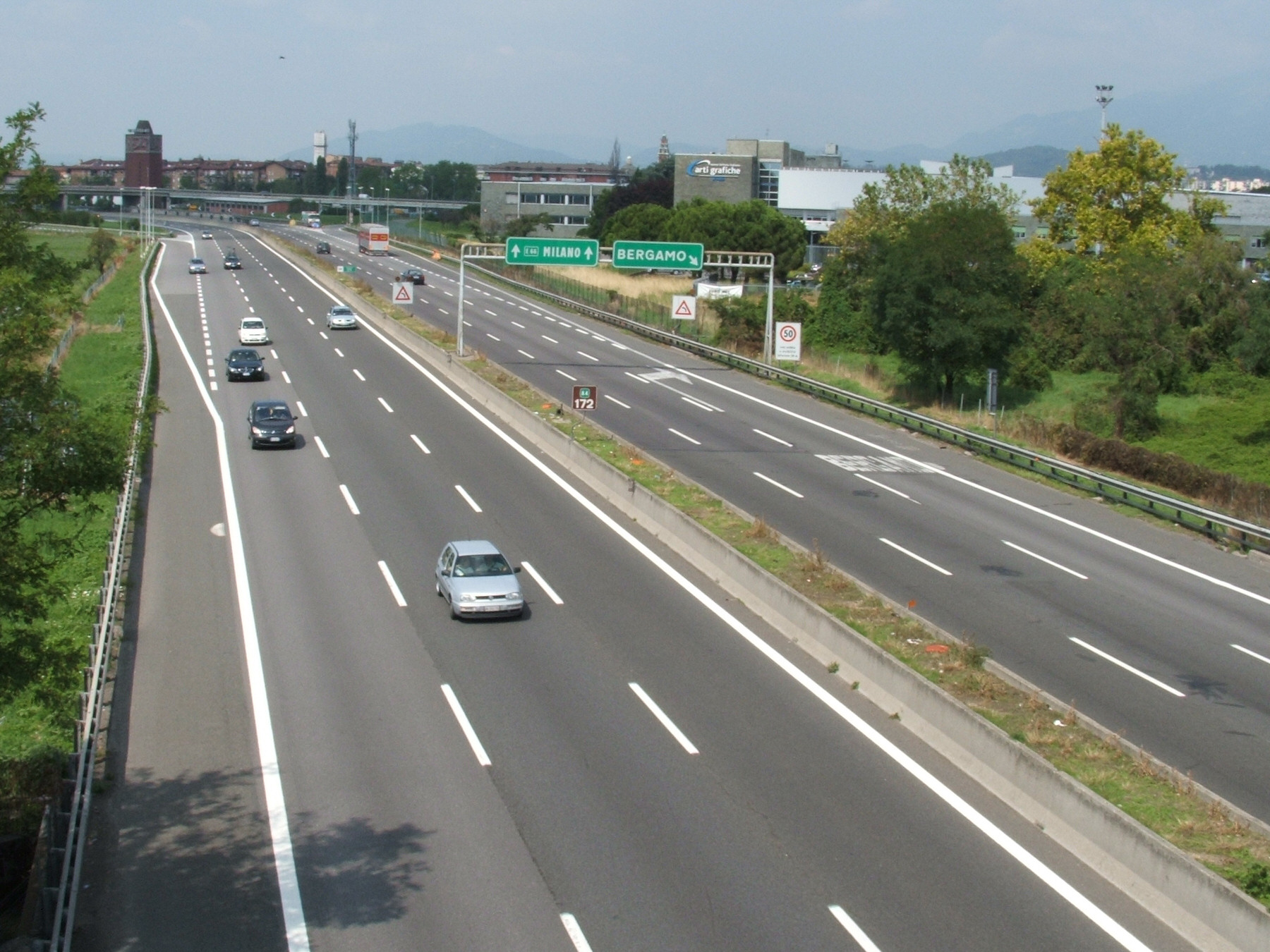
Autostrada A4 near Bergamo

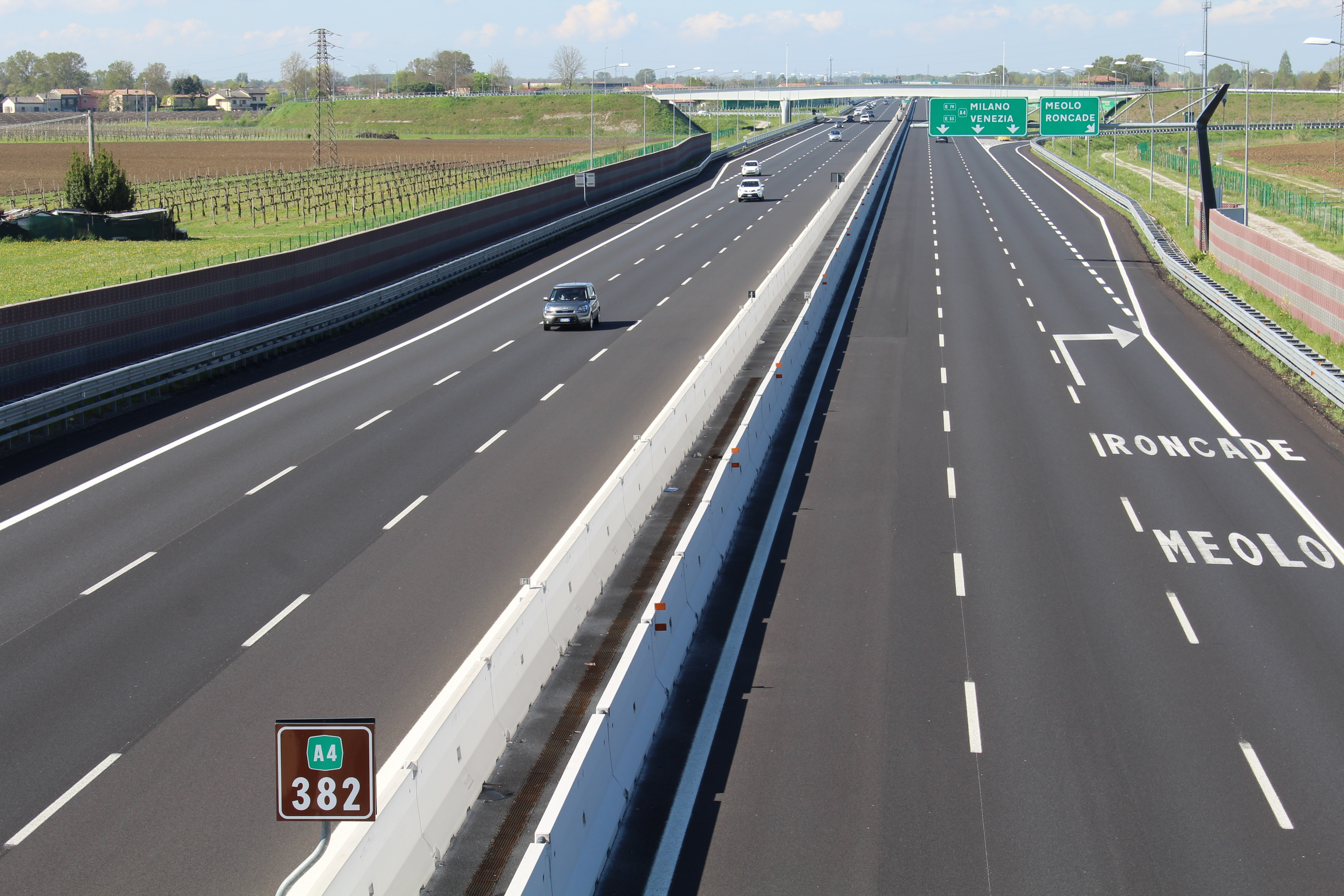
Autostrada A4 near Meolo

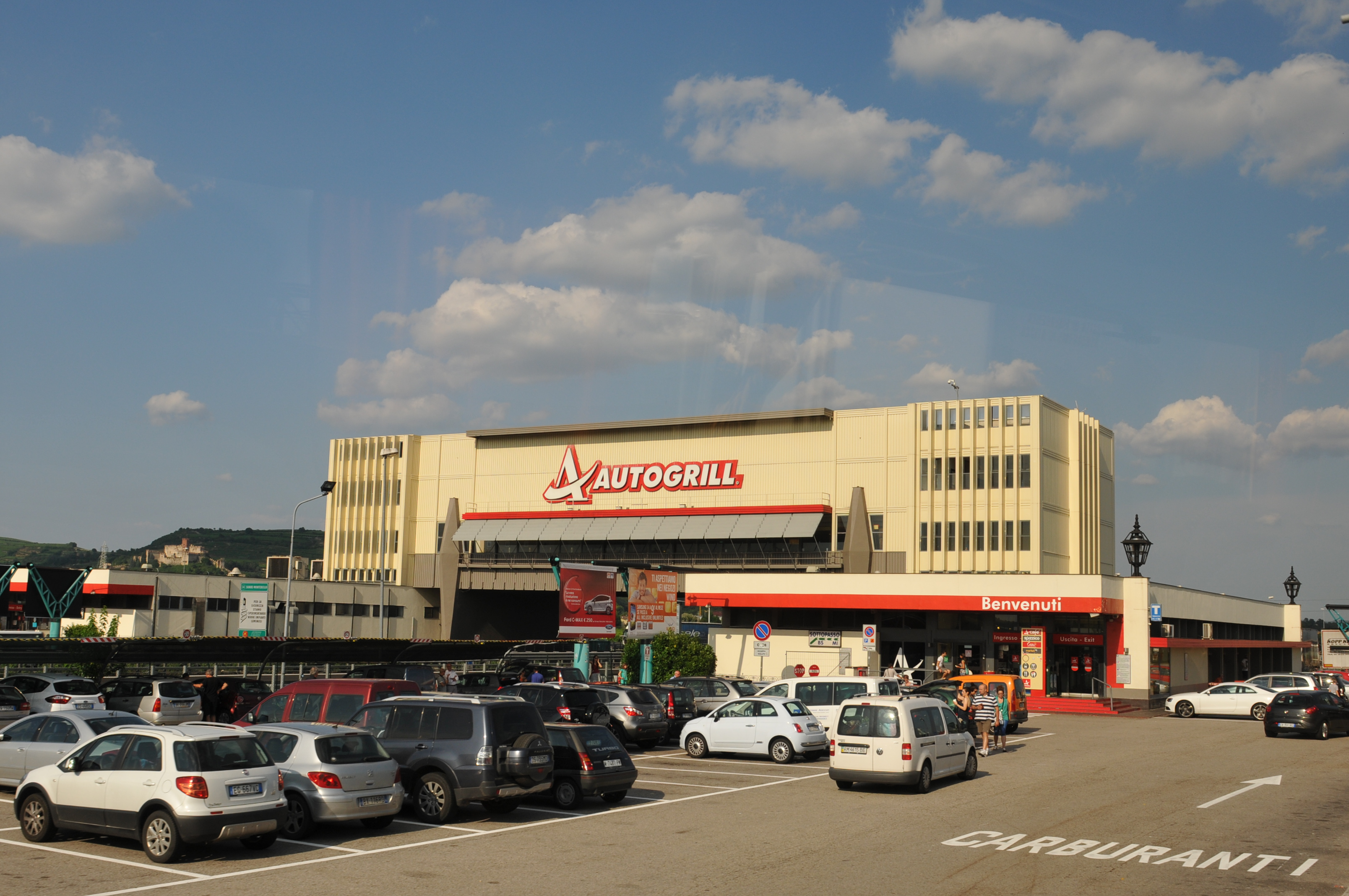
Rest area "Scaligera"

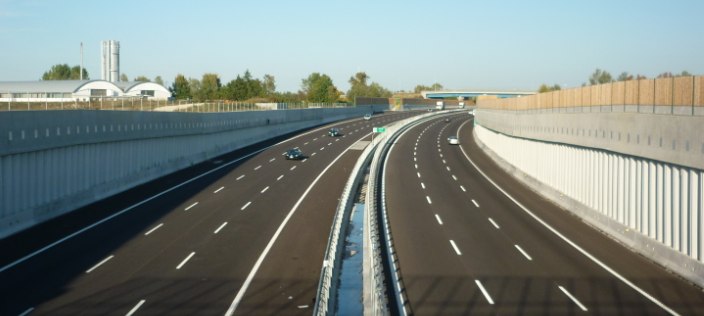
Autostrada A4 near Mestre (Passante di Mestre)

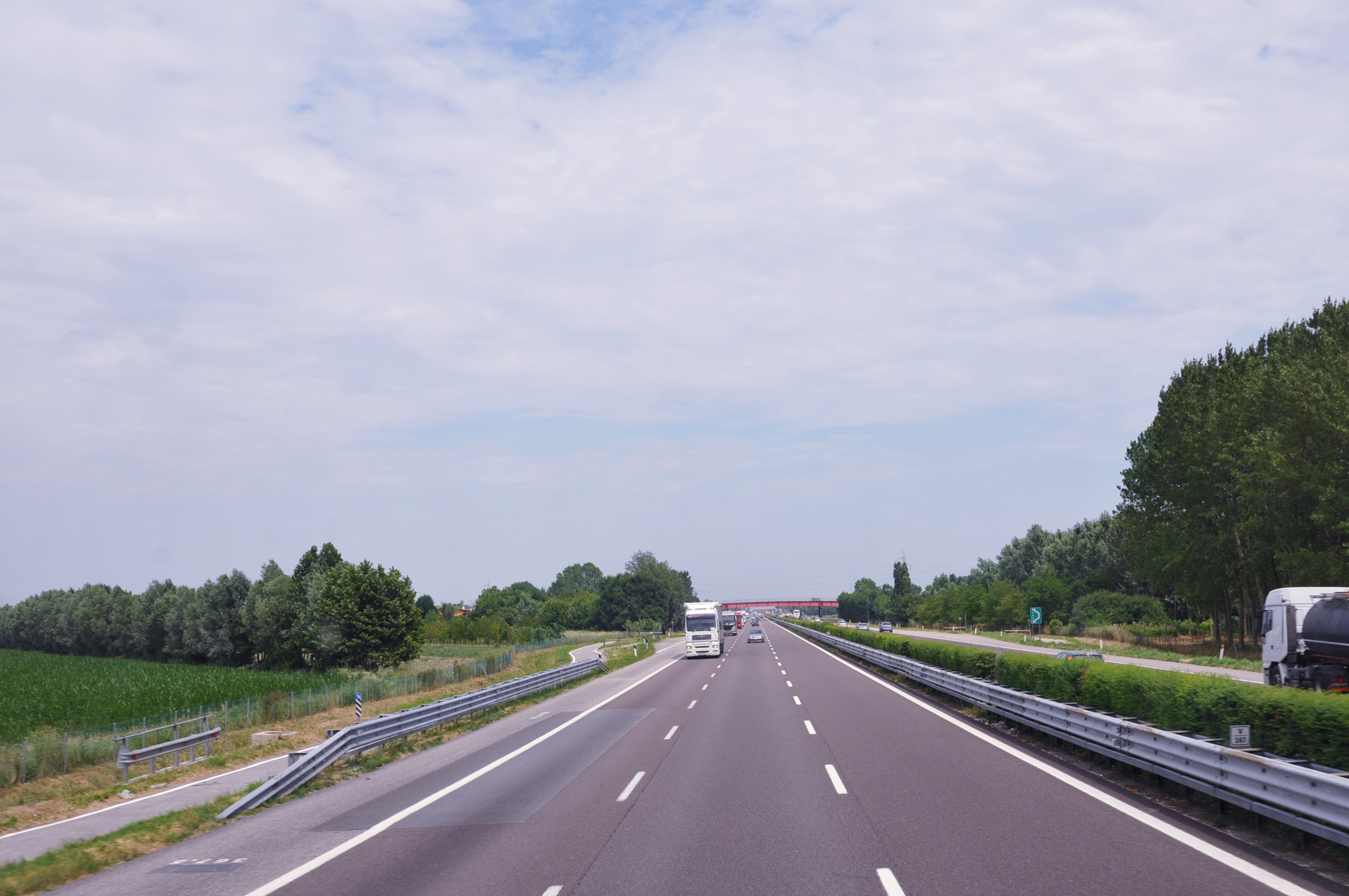
Autostrada A4 near Vigonza

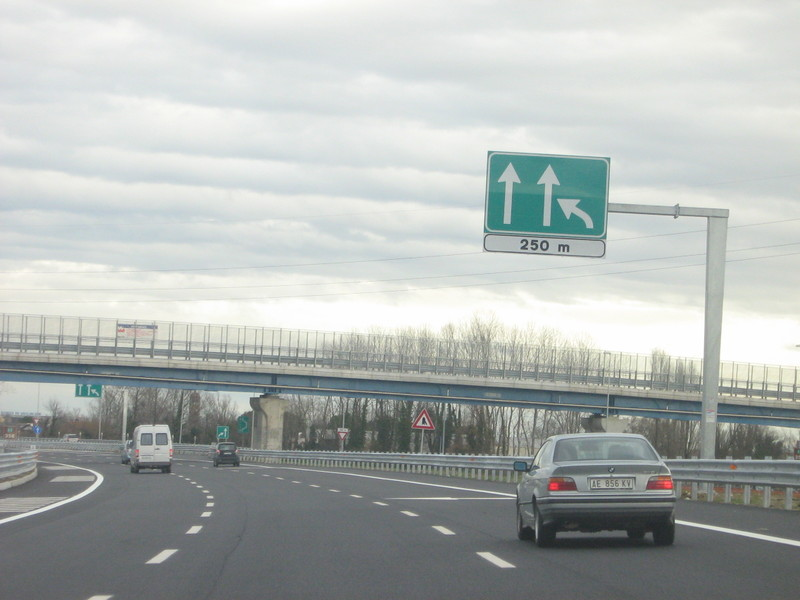
Autostrada A4 near Quarto d'Altino

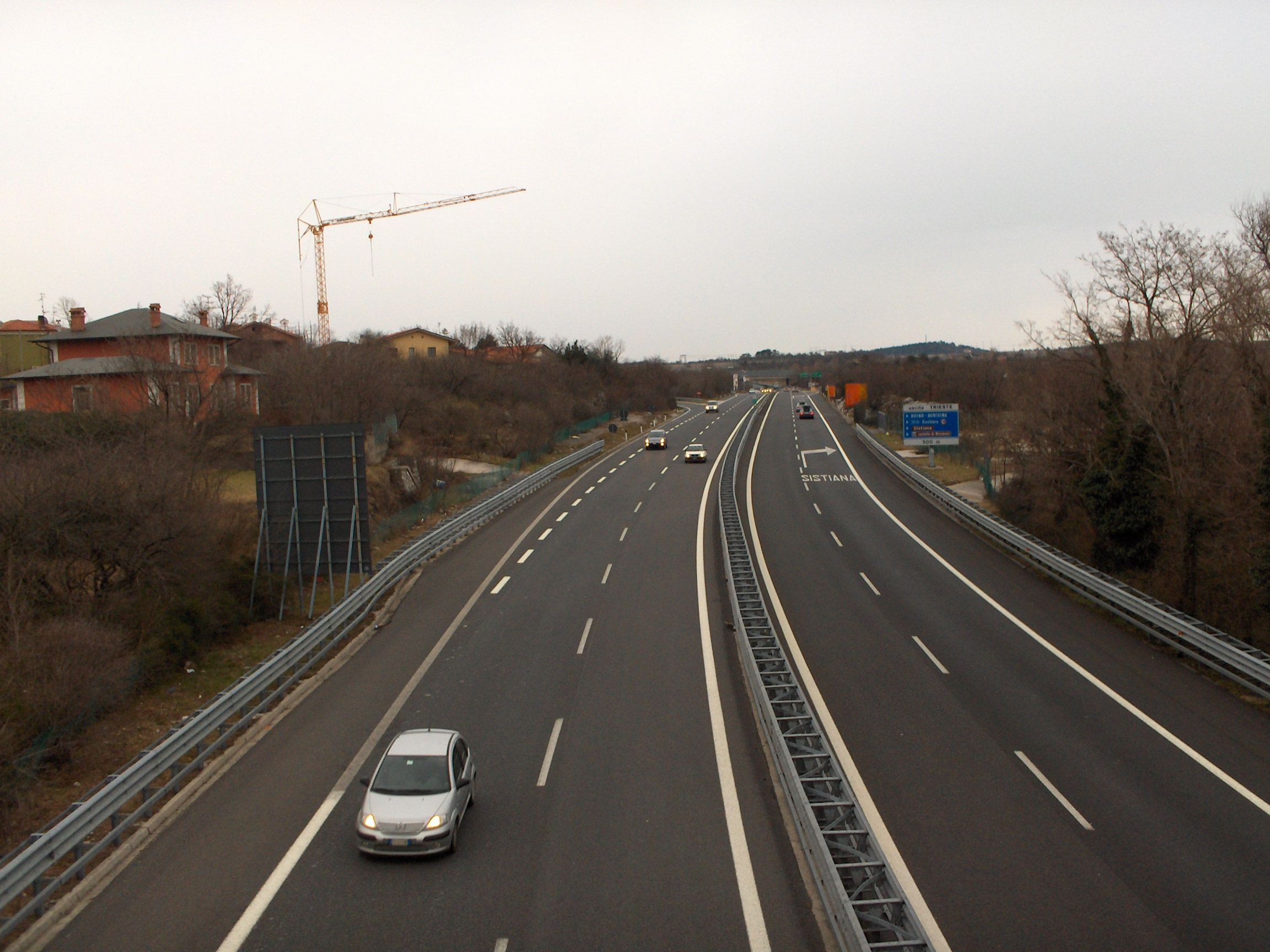
Autostrada A4 near Sistiana

TURIN - TRIESTE; Autostrada Serenissima
Exit	↓km↓	↑km↑	Province	European Route
Turin C.so Giulio Cesare	0.0 km (0 mi)	523.1 km (325.0 mi)	TO	E64
Turin Abbadia di Stura; Tangenziale Nord; Turin Caselle Airport; Aosta; Traforo del Frejus - France–Italy border	2.0 km (1.2 mi)	521.1 km (323.8 mi)	TO	E64
Rest area "Settimo Torinese"	3.0 km (1.9 mi)	520.1 km (323.2 mi)	TO	E64
Settimo Torinese	4.0 km (2.5 mi)	519.1 km (322.6 mi)	TO	E64
Brandizzo; Leinì, Volpiano	10.0 km (6.2 mi)	513.1 km (318.8 mi)	TO	E64
Chivasso ovest	14.0 km (8.7 mi)	509.1 km (316.3 mi)	TO	E64
Chivasso centro Caluso, Ivrea	16.0 km (9.9 mi)	507.1 km (315.1 mi)	TO	E64
Chivasso est Raccordo Chivasso est	19.0 km (11.8 mi)	504.1 km (313.2 mi)	TO	E64
Rondissone	24.0 km (14.9 mi)	499.1 km (310.1 mi)	TO	E64
Toll gate Rondissone	24.3 km (15.1 mi)	498.8 km (309.9 mi)	TO	E64
Rest area "San Rocco" (Note: Only in the direction of Trieste)	24.4 km (15.2 mi)	--	VC	E64
Rest area "Cigliano" (Note: Only in the direction of Turin)	--	491.2 km (305.2 mi)	VC	E64
Cigliano	32.9 km (20.4 mi)	490.2 km (304.6 mi)	VC	E64
Borgo d'Ale	36.8 km (22.9 mi)	486.3 km (302.2 mi)	VC	E64
Diramazione Ivrea - Santhià; Diramazione Stroppiana-Santhià; Aosta; Aosta; Genoa	43.8 km (27.2 mi)	479.3 km (297.8 mi)	VC	E64
Santhià; Biella	45.2 km (28.1 mi)	477.9 km (297.0 mi)	VC	E64
Carisio; Biella	54.4 km (33.8 mi)	468.7 km (291.2 mi)	VC	E64
Balocco	60.0 km (37.3 mi)	463.1 km (287.8 mi)	VC	E64
Rest area "Villarboit"	64.2 km (39.9 mi)	458.9 km (285.1 mi)	VC	E64
Greggio	67.5 km (41.9 mi)	455.6 km (283.1 mi)	VC	E64
Genoa - Gravellona T.	72.4 km (45.0 mi)	450.7 km (280.1 mi)	NO	E64
Biandrate-Vicolungo	73.6 km (45.7 mi)	449.5 km (279.3 mi)	NO	E64
Novara Ovest	82.9 km (51.5 mi)	440.2 km (273.5 mi)	NO	E64
Rest area "Novara"	88.7 km (55.1 mi)	434.4 km (269.9 mi)	NO	E64
Novara Est	90.5 km (56.2 mi)	432.6 km (268.8 mi)	NO	E64
Marcallo-Mesero; Strada statale 336 dell'Aeroporto della Malpensa; Milan Malpensa Airport	104.5 km (64.9 mi)	418.6 km (260.1 mi)	MI	E64
Arluno	110.9 km (68.9 mi)	412.2 km (256.1 mi)	MI	E64
Rho	118.4 km (73.6 mi)	404.7 km (251.5 mi)	MI	E64
Toll gate Milano Ghisolfa	120.8 km (75.1 mi)	402.3 km (250.0 mi)	MI	E64
Tangenziale Ovest di Milano; Bologna; Genoa; Varese, Sesto C. Milan Malpensa Airport; Como, Chiasso	120.9 km (75.1 mi)	402.2 km (249.9 mi)	MI	E64
Rest area "Pero"	122.7 km (76.2 mi)	400.4 km (248.8 mi)	MI	E64
Pero	122.9 km (76.4 mi)	400.2 km (248.7 mi)	MI	E64
Varese; Milan V.le Certosa; Fiera Milano	125.0 km (77.7 mi)	398.1 km (247.4 mi)	MI	E64
Cormano; Bresso - Milan Niguarda; Superstrada Milan-Meda-Cermenate	129.5 km (80.5 mi)	393.6 km (244.6 mi)	MI	E64
Rest area "Lambro"	133.6 km (83.0 mi)	389.5 km (242.0 mi)	MI	E64
Cinisello Balsamo-Sesto San Giovanni; Superstrada Milan-Lecco-Morbegno; Milan V.le Zara	136.1 km (84.6 mi)	387.0 km (240.5 mi)	MI	E64
Toll gate Milano Est	138.0 km (85.7 mi)	385.1 km (239.3 mi)	MB	E64
Tangenziale Nord Milano; Monza	138.0 km (85.7 mi)	385.1 km (239.3 mi)	MB	E64
Tangenziale Est Milano; Milan Linate Airport	144.5 km (89.8 mi)	378.6 km (235.3 mi)	MB	E64
Agrate Brianza	145.5 km (90.4 mi)	377.6 km (234.6 mi)	MB	E64
Tangenziale est esterna di Milano; Milan Linate Airport	146.3 km (90.9 mi)	376.8 km (234.1 mi)	MB	E64
Rest area "Brianza"	148.4 km (92.2 mi)	374.7 km (232.8 mi)	MB	E64
Cavenago-Cambiago	149.7 km (93.0 mi)	373.4 km (232.0 mi)	MB	E64
Trezzo sull'Adda	156.8 km (97.4 mi)	366.3 km (227.6 mi)	MI	E64
Capriate	160.3 km (99.6 mi)	362.8 km (225.4 mi)	BG	E64
Rest area "Brembo"	165.7 km (103.0 mi)	357.4 km (222.1 mi)	BG	E64
Dalmine	165.4 km (102.8 mi)	357.7 km (222.3 mi)	BG	E64
Bergamo; Milan Bergamo Airport	172.1 km (106.9 mi)	351.0 km (218.1 mi)	BG	E64
Seriate	178.7 km (111.0 mi)	344.4 km (214.0 mi)	BG	E64
Grumello-Telgate	187.3 km (116.4 mi)	335.8 km (208.7 mi)	BG	E64
Ponte Oglio	190.6 km (118.4 mi)	332.5 km (206.6 mi)	BG	E64
Palazzolo	192.8 km (119.8 mi)	330.3 km (205.2 mi)	BS	E64
Rest area "Sebino"	197.5 km (122.7 mi)	325.6 km (202.3 mi)	BS	E64
Rovato	201.0 km (124.9 mi)	322.1 km (200.1 mi)	BS	E64
Ospitaletto	206.0 km (128.0 mi)	317.1 km (197.0 mi)	BS	E64
BreBeMi (Note: Only in the direction of Milan)	210.0 km (130.5 mi)	313.1 km (194.6 mi)	BS	E64
Rest area "Val Trompia"	213.7 km (132.8 mi)	309.4 km (192.3 mi)	BS	E64
Brescia Ovest; Fiera di Brescia	214.9 km (133.5 mi)	308.2 km (191.5 mi)	BS	E64
Piacenza; Brescia Centro; Brescia Sud; Poliambulanza	222.3 km (138.1 mi)	300.8 km (186.9 mi)	BS	E64
Rest area "S. Giacomo"	226.5 km (140.7 mi)	296.6 km (184.3 mi)	BS	E70
Brescia Est; Brescia Montichiari Airport	228.8 km (142.2 mi)	294.3 km (182.9 mi)	BS	E70
Desenzano	243.9 km (151.6 mi)	279.2 km (173.5 mi)	BS	E70
Rest area "Monte Alto"	244.6 km (152.0 mi)	278.5 km (173.1 mi)	BS	E70
Sirmione	251.3 km (156.2 mi)	271.8 km (168.9 mi)	BS	E70
Peschiera	258.8 km (160.8 mi)	264.3 km (164.2 mi)	VR	E70
Castelnuovo del Garda (under construction); Strada Statale 450 di Affi	263.1 km (163.5 mi)	260.0 km (161.6 mi)	VR	E70
Sommacampagna; Verona Villafranca Airport	270.4 km (168.0 mi)	252.7 km (157.0 mi)	VR	E70
Rest area "Monte Baldo"	271.7 km (168.8 mi)	251.4 km (156.2 mi)	VR	E70
Autostrada A22; Verona nord Verona Villafranca Airport	275.3 km (171.1 mi)	247.8 km (154.0 mi)	VR	E70
Verona Sud	279.8 km (173.9 mi)	243.3 km (151.2 mi)	VR	E70
Verona Est; Transpolesana: Legnago - Rovigo	289.7 km (180.0 mi)	233.4 km (145.0 mi)	VR	E70
Rest area "Scaligera"	300.7 km (186.8 mi)	222.4 km (138.2 mi)	VR	E70
Soave	302.4 km (187.9 mi)	220.7 km (137.1 mi)	VR	E70
Montebello	311.4 km (193.5 mi)	211.7 km (131.5 mi)	VI	E70
Montecchio	320.6 km (199.2 mi)	202.5 km (125.8 mi)	VI	E70
Rest area "Villa Morosini ovest"	324.8 km (201.8 mi)	198.3 km (123.2 mi)	VI	E70
Vicenza Ovest	326.6 km (202.9 mi)	196.5 km (122.1 mi)	VI	E70
Vicenza Est	334.2 km (207.7 mi)	188.9 km (117.4 mi)	VI	E70
Piovene Rocchette; Vicenza nord	335.6 km (208.5 mi)	187.5 km (116.5 mi)	VI	E70
Rest area "Tesina est"	336.0 km (208.8 mi)	187.1 km (116.3 mi)	VI	E70
Grisignano	343.3 km (213.3 mi)	179.8 km (111.7 mi)	VI	E70
Rest area "Limenella"	354.5 km (220.3 mi)	168.6 km (104.8 mi)	PD	E70
Padua Ovest; Tangenziale di Padova	356.2 km (221.3 mi)	166.9 km (103.7 mi)	PD	E70
Padua Est; Tangenziale di Padova	363.3 km (225.7 mi)	159.8 km (99.3 mi)	PD	E70
Bologna - Padua; Padua industrial area	364.2 km (226.3 mi)	158.9 km (98.7 mi)	PD	E70
Rest area "Arino"	372.5 km (231.5 mi)	150.6 km (93.6 mi)	VE	E70
Tangenziale di Venezia - Mestre (west)	374.6 km (232.8 mi)	148.5 km (92.3 mi)	VE	E70
Spinea	380.9 km (236.7 mi)	142.2 km (88.4 mi)	VE	E70
Martellago - Scorzè	389.4 km (242.0 mi)	133.7 km (83.1 mi)	VE	E70
Preganziol	400.0 km (248.5 mi)	123.1 km (76.5 mi)	TV	E70
Belluno; Venezia Tessera Airport; Tangenziale di Venezia (north)	402.0 km (249.8 mi)	121.1 km (75.2 mi)	TV	E70
Tangenziale di Venezia - Quarto d'Altino (east); Venice Tessera Airport	407.0 km (252.9 mi)	116.1 km (72.1 mi)	VE	E70
Meolo-Roncade	416.0 km (258.5 mi)	107.1 km (66.5 mi)	VE-TV	E55; E70
San Donà di Piave-Noventa	424.0 km (263.5 mi)	99.1 km (61.6 mi)	VE	E55; E70
Rest area "Calstorta"	431.0 km (267.8 mi)	92.1 km (57.2 mi)	VE	E70
Cessalto	432.0 km (268.4 mi)	91.1 km (56.6 mi)	TV	E55; E70
Santo Stino di Livenza	439.0 km (272.8 mi)	84.1 km (52.3 mi)	VE	E55; E70
Conegliano	452.0 km (280.9 mi)	71.1 km (44.2 mi)	VE	E55; E70
Rest area "Fratta"	456.0 km (283.3 mi)	67.1 km (41.7 mi)	VE	E55; E70
Latisana; Bretella Latisana	467.0 km (290.2 mi)	56.1 km (34.9 mi)	UD	E55; E70
San Giorgio di Nogaro-Porpetto	483.0 km (300.1 mi)	40.1 km (24.9 mi)	UD	E55; E70
Rest area "Gonars"	487.0 km (302.6 mi)	36.1 km (22.4 mi)	VE	E70
Tarvisio; Austria–Italy border - Villach - Vienna	490.0 km (304.5 mi)	33.1 km (20.6 mi)	UD	E70
Palmanova	491.0 km (305.1 mi)	32.1 km (19.9 mi)	UD	E70
Villesse - Gorizia; Italy–Slovenia border - Nova Gorica	501.0 km (311.3 mi)	22.1 km (13.7 mi)	GO	E70
Redipuglia - Monfalcone Ovest di Ronchi dei Legionari; Trieste Ronchi dei Legionari Airport	506.0 km (314.4 mi)	17.1 km (10.6 mi)	GO	E70
Toll gate Lisert	515.0 km (320.0 mi)	8.1 km (5.0 mi)	GO	E70
Monfalcone Est	515.0 km (320.0 mi)	8.1 km (5.0 mi)	GO	E70
Rest area "Duino"	519.0 km (322.5 mi)	4.1 km (2.5 mi)	TS	E70
Duino	520.0 km (323.1 mi)	3.1 km (1.9 mi)	TS	E70
Sistiana; Trieste - Italy–Slovenia border - Rabuiese - Istria	523.0 km (325.0 mi)	0.1 km (0.062 mi)	TS	E70
Spur Sistiana - Padriciano Italy–Slovenia border Ljubljana	523.1 km (325.0 mi)	0.0 km (0 mi)	TS	E70

=== A4/A5 Ivrea-Santhià connection ===
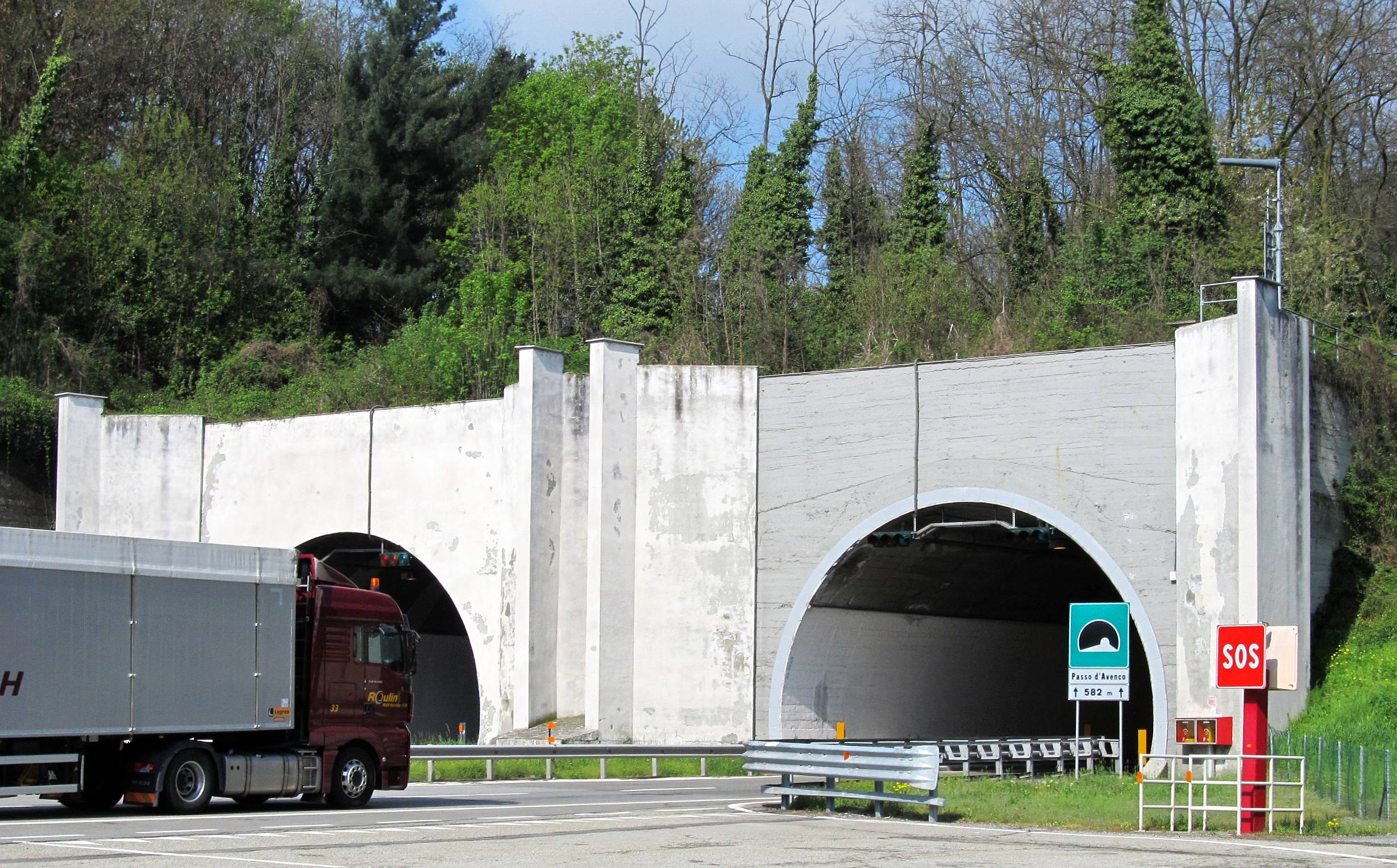
A4/A5 Ivrea-Santhià connection: Avenco pass tunnel

AUTOSTRADA A4/A5; Ivrea-Santhià connection
Exit	↓km↓	↑km↑	Province	European route
Turin - Aosta	0.0 km (0 mi)	23.6 km (14.7 mi)	TO	E25
Albiano ex del Lago di Viverone - Ivrea	7.9 km (4.9 mi)	15.7 km (9.8 mi)	TO	E25
Rest area "Viverone"	13.0 km (8.1 mi)	10.6 km (6.6 mi)	TO	E25
Turin - Milan; Santhià	23.5 km (14.6 mi)	0.1 km (0.062 mi)	VC	E25
Diramazione Stroppiana - Santhià; Genoa - Gravellona Toce	23.6 km (14.7 mi)	0.0 km (0 mi)	VC	E25

=== A4/A26 Stroppiana-Santhià connection ===
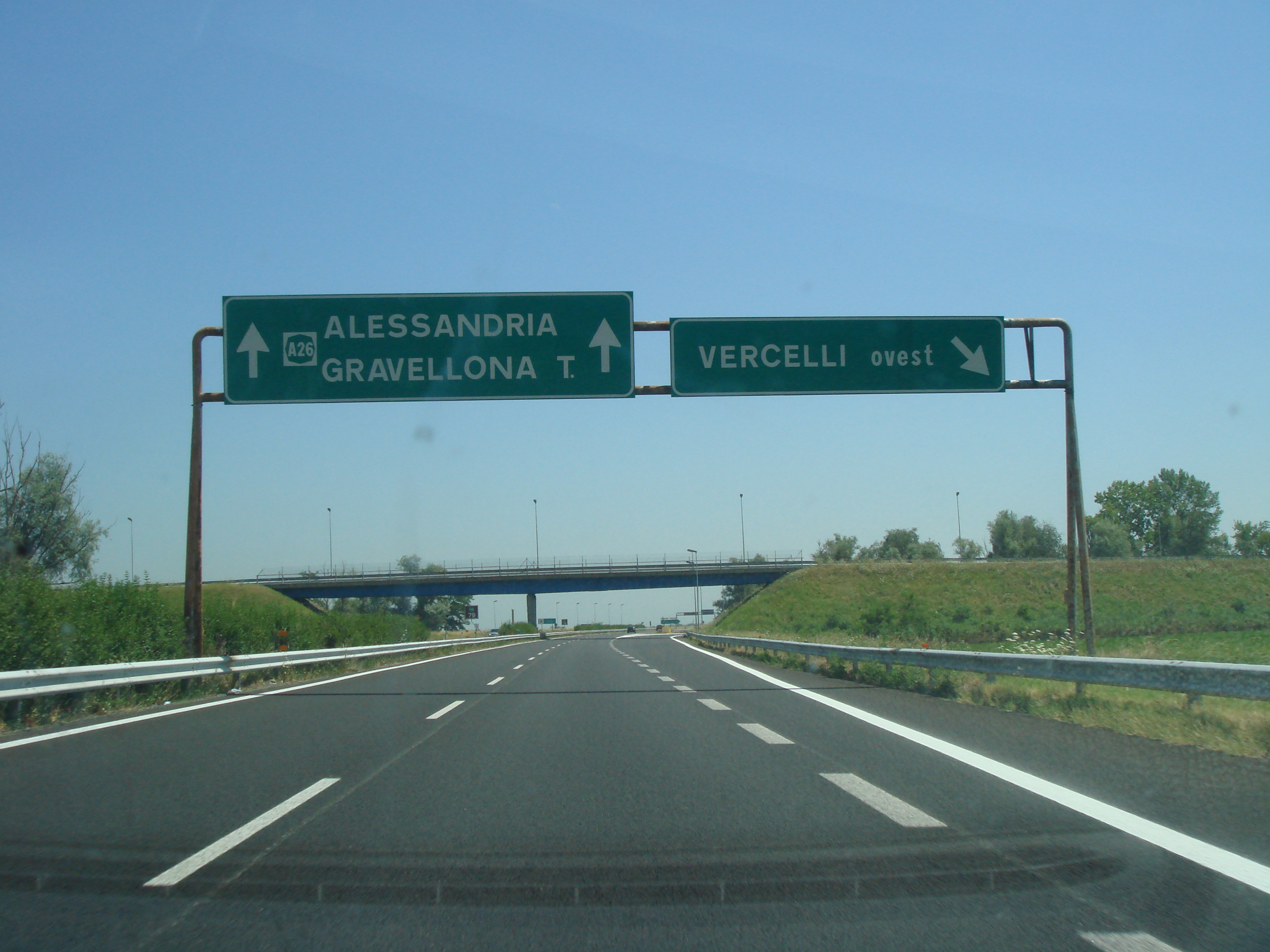
A4/A26 Stroppiana-Santhià connection

AUTOSTRADA A4/A26; A4/A26 Stroppiana-Santhià connection
Exit	↓km↓	↑km↑	Province	European route
Genoa - Gravellona Toce	0.0 km (0 mi)	30.7 km (19.1 mi)	VC	E25
Rest area "Le Risaie" (Note: Only in the direction of Alessandria-Gravellona Toce)	-	29.3 km (18.2 mi)	VC	E25
Vercelli Ovest	8.0 km (5.0 mi)	22.7 km (14.1 mi)	VC	E25
Rest area "Cavour" (Note: Only in the direction of Genoa.)	29.0 km (18.0 mi)	-	VC	E25
Turin - Milan; Santhià	30.6 km (19.0 mi)	0.1 km (0.062 mi)	VC	E25
A4/5 Ivrea; Turin - Aosta	30.7 km (19.1 mi)	0.0 km (0 mi)	VC	E25

=== Chivasso connection ===
RACCORDO EST DI CHIVASSO; Chivasso connection
Exit	↓km↓	↑km↑	Province
Turin - Milan; Exit Chivasso Est	0.0 km (0 mi)	5.0 km (3.1 mi)	TO
Rondissone Ovest; Padana Superiore	1.6 km (0.99 mi)	3.4 km (2.1 mi)	TO
Verolengo del Monferrato	5.0 km (3.1 mi)	0.0 km (0 mi)	TO

=== Latisana connection ===
BRETELLA DI LATISANA; Latisana connection
Exit	↓km↓	↑km↑	Province
Exit Latisana	0.0 km (0 mi)	2.6 km (1.6 mi)	UD
Roundabout SP75	1.6 km (0.99 mi)	1.0 km (0.62 mi)	UD
della Venezia Giulia	2.6 km (1.6 mi)	0.0 km (0 mi)	UD

== See also ==
- Autostrade of Italy
- Roads in Italy
- Transport in Italy

=== Other Italian roads ===
- State highways (Italy)
- Regional road (Italy)
- Provincial road (Italy)
- Municipal road (Italy)
