= European route E25 =

Road in trans-European E-road network

E25

Major junctions
- North end: Hook of Holland, Netherlands
- South end: Palermo, Italy

Location
- Countries: Netherlands; Belgium; Luxembourg; France; Switzerland; Italy

Highway system
- International E-road network; A Class; B Class

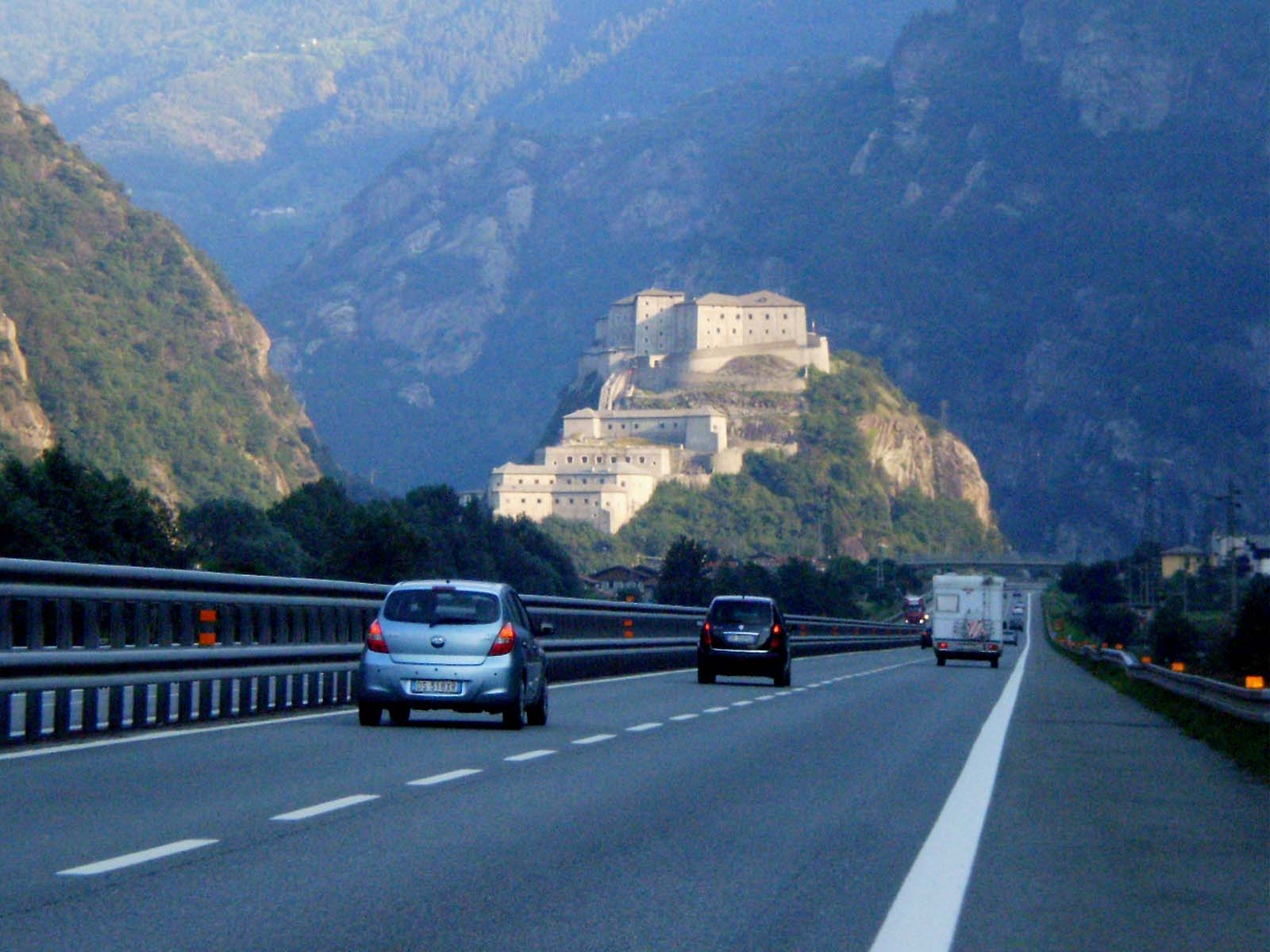
European route 25 near Bard, Italy.

European route E25 is a north–south European route from Hook of Holland in the Netherlands, to Palermo in Italy which includes ferry crossings from Genoa to Bastia (Corsica), from Bonifacio to Porto Torres (Sardinia) and from Cagliari to Palermo (Sicily).

It passes through the following cities: Hook of Holland – Rotterdam – Utrecht - Eindhoven – Maastricht – Liège – Bastogne – Arlon – Luxembourg City – Metz – Saint-Avold – Strasbourg – Mulhouse – Basel – Olten – Bern – Lausanne – Geneva – Mont Blanc Tunnel – Aosta – Ivrea – Vercelli – Alessandria – Genoa ... Bastia – Porto-Vecchio – Bonifacio ... Porto Torres – Sassari – Cagliari ... Palermo.

== Route description ==
The Belgian part of the E25 is also denoted as 'Route du Soleil'. The title was rejected by France because there is already a 'Route du Soleil' connecting Paris and Marseille. The Belgian 'Route du Soleil' is a branch of the original route, connecting Amsterdam and Marseille and joining the E25 near Utrecht (NL) towards Metz (F).

The N205 carrying the E25 to the Mont Blanc Tunnel is named the "Route Blanche".

== Morandi Bridge collapse ==
On 14 August 2018 a section of the A10 motorway called the Morandi Bridge collapsed in the city of Genoa, Italy, claiming the lives of 43 civilians. The reason for the collapse was a mix between what a witness reports as a lightning strike and poor design and questionable construction methods. This section of the E25 reopened on 4 August 2020.

== Route ==
- The Netherlands
  - N 220: Hook of Holland ( E30) - Maasdijk
  - A 20: Maasdijk - Rotterdam ( E19, Towards E31) - Gouda ( E35)
  - A 12: Gouda (Start of Concurrency with E35) – Utrecht (End of Concurrency with E35)
  - A 2: Utrecht ( E35) - Vianen ( E311) - Geldermalsen ( E31) - 's-Hertogenbosch - Eindhoven ( E34 E312) - Geleen ( E314) - Maastricht - Eijsden
- Belgium
  - A25: Visé - Liège ( E40 E42)
  - A3: Liège ( E40 E42 E313)
  - A602: Liège ( E40 E42)
  - A26: Neufchâteau ( E411)
  - A4: Neufchâteau ( E411) - Arlon ( E411)
- Luxembourg
  - A 6: Kleinbettingen - Luxembourg ( E44)
  - A 3: Luxembourg ( E44) - Dudelange
- France
  - A 31: Kanfen - Metz ( E411 E50)
  - A 4: Metz ( E50) - Freyming-Merlebach ( E50) - Sarralbe ( E29) - Strasbourg
  - A 35: Strasbourg ( E52) - Sélestat
  - D 83: Sélestat - Colmar
  - A 35: Colmar - Mulhouse ( E54, Start of Concurrency with E60) - Saint-Louis
- Switzerland
  - A 2: Basel (End of Concurrency with E60, Start of Concurrency with E35) - Olten (End of Concurrency with E35)
  - A 1: Olten ( E35) - Moosseedorf ( E27)
  - A 1 / A 6: Moosseedorf ( E27) - Bern
  - A 1: Bern ( E27) - Yverdon-les-Bains ( E23)
  - A 1 / A 9: Yverdon-les-Bains ( E23) - Lausanne
  - A 1: Lausanne ( E23, Start of Concurrency with E62) - Genève
- France
  - A 41: Saint-Julien-en-Genevois ( E21, End of Concurrency with E62)
  - A 40: Saint-Julien-en-Genevois ( E21 E62) - Annemasse ( E712) - Passy
  - N 205: Passy - Chamonix-Mont-Blanc
- Italy
  - T 1: Courmayeur
  - A 5: Courmayeur - Aosta ( E27) - Ivrea ( E612)
  - A 4 / A 5: Ivrea ( E612) - Santhià ( E64)
  - A 26 / A 4: Santhià ( E64) - Vercelli
  - A 26: Vercelli - Alessandria ( E70 E74) - Genoa ( E80)
  - A 10: Genoa ( E80)
  - A 7: Genoa ( E80)
- Gap (Ligurian Sea)
  - : (Italy) Genoa - (France) Bastia
- France
  - T11: Bastia - Lucciana
  - T10: Lucciana - Porto-Vecchio - Bonifacio
  - T41: Bonifacio
- Gap (Mediterranean Sea)
  - : (France) Bonifacio - (Italy) Porto Torres
- Italy
  - SS 131: Porto Torres - Sassari - Codrongianos ( E840) - Cagliari
  - SS 554: Cagliari
  - Cagliari - Palermo
