= Gorsexio Viaduct =

Gorsexio Viaduct Viadotto Gorsexio
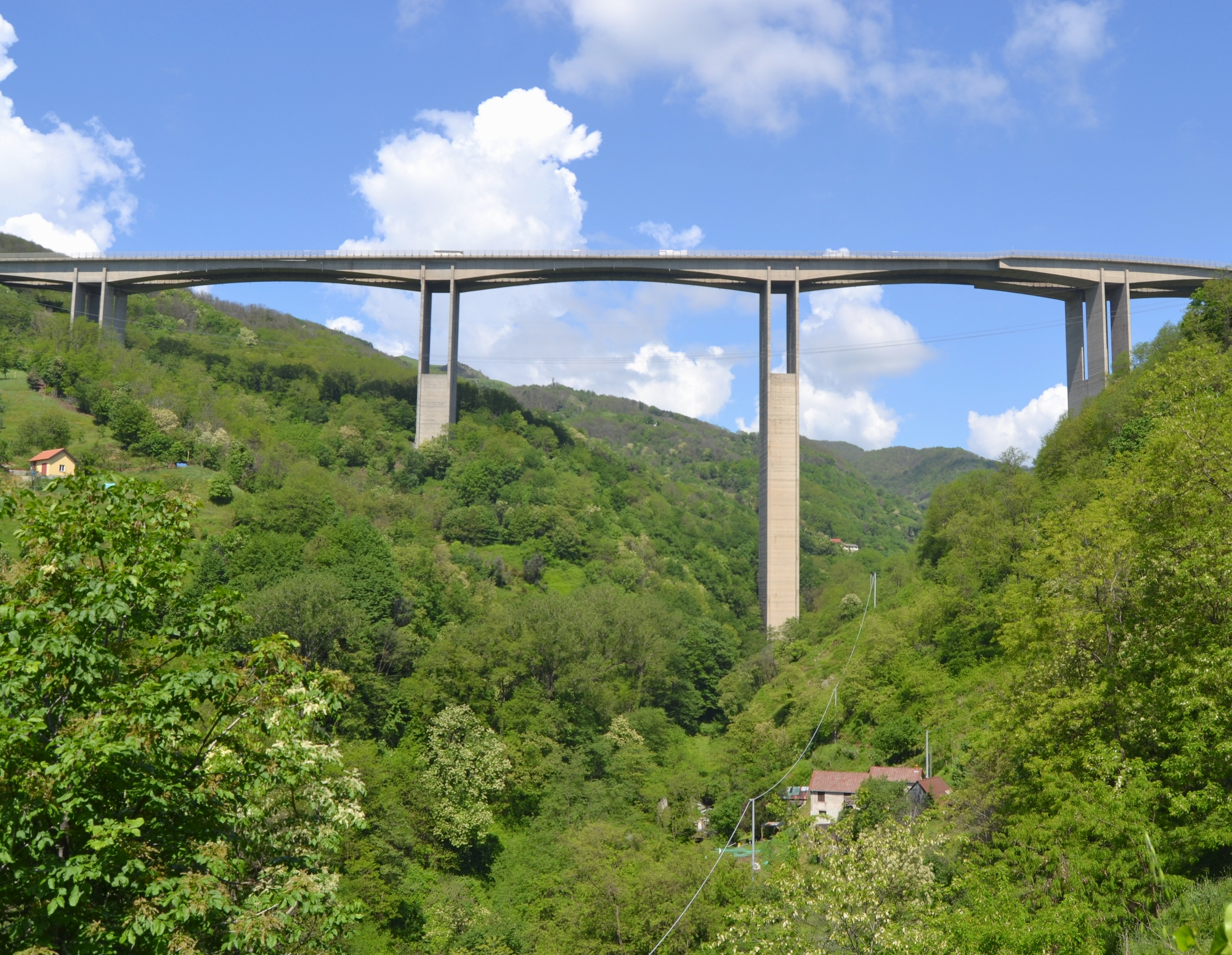
- Coordinates: 44°27′05″N 8°44′31″E
- Carries: Motor vehicles
- Crosses: Gorsexio Valley
- Locale: Genoa and Mele, Italy

Characteristics
- Material: Reinforced concrete
- Total length: 672 metres (2,205 ft)
- Height: 172 metres (564 ft)
- Longest span: 144 metres (472 ft)
- No. of lanes: 6

History
- Designer: Silvano Zorzi, Giorgio Grasselli, Enrico Faro
- Constructed by: Cooperativa Muratori e Cementisti
- Construction start: 1972
- Construction end: 1978

Location
- Interactive map of Gorsexio Viaduct

The Gorsexio Viaduct (Italian pronunciation: [ɡorˈsɛːzjo]) is located on the A26 motorway (European route E25) between Genoa and Mele, in Italy.

It was projected by Silvano Zorzi, Giorgio Grasselli and Enrico Faro, and built between 1972 and 1978 by the Cooperativa Muratori e Cementisti.

== Bibliography ==
- Viadotto sul torrente Gorsexio per l'autostrada Voltri-Alessandria, in L'Industria Italiana del Cemento, anno XLVIII, nº 4, Roma, AITEC, April 1978, pp. 214–219, ISSN 0019-7637
