= Autostrada A26 (Italy) =

Controlled-access highway in Italy

Autostrada A26
- Autostrada dei Trafori; Tunnels motoway

Route information
- Part of E25 and E62
- Maintained by Autostrade per l'Italia S.p.A.
- Length: 197.1 km (122.5 mi)
- Existed: 1977–present

Major junctions
- South end: Genoa
- A10 in Genoa; A21 in Alessandria; A4 in Vercelli
- North end: Gravellona Toce

Location
- Country: Italy
- Regions: Liguria, Piedmont

Highway system
- Roads in Italy; Autostrade; State; Regional; Provincial; Municipal
← A 25	→ A 27

The Autostrada A26 is an autostrada (Italian for "motorway") 197.1 kilometres (122.5 mi) long in Italy located in the regions of Liguria and Piedmont. It is named the Autostrada dei Trafori ("Tunnels motoway") after the numerous tunnels through which it passes, both Apennine and Subalpine. It runs northwards from Genoa on the Ligurian coast, over the Apennines, and across the wide plain of the Po valley to the environs of Lake Maggiore and the mouth of the Val d’Ossola. In addition to this ‘main trunk’ of the road, there are three side branches, also of motorway class which function as link roads between the A26 and the A7, the A4 and the A8. The A26, together with these link roads, is managed by Autostrade per l'Italia S.p.A. It is a part of the E25 and E62 European routes.

== Route ==
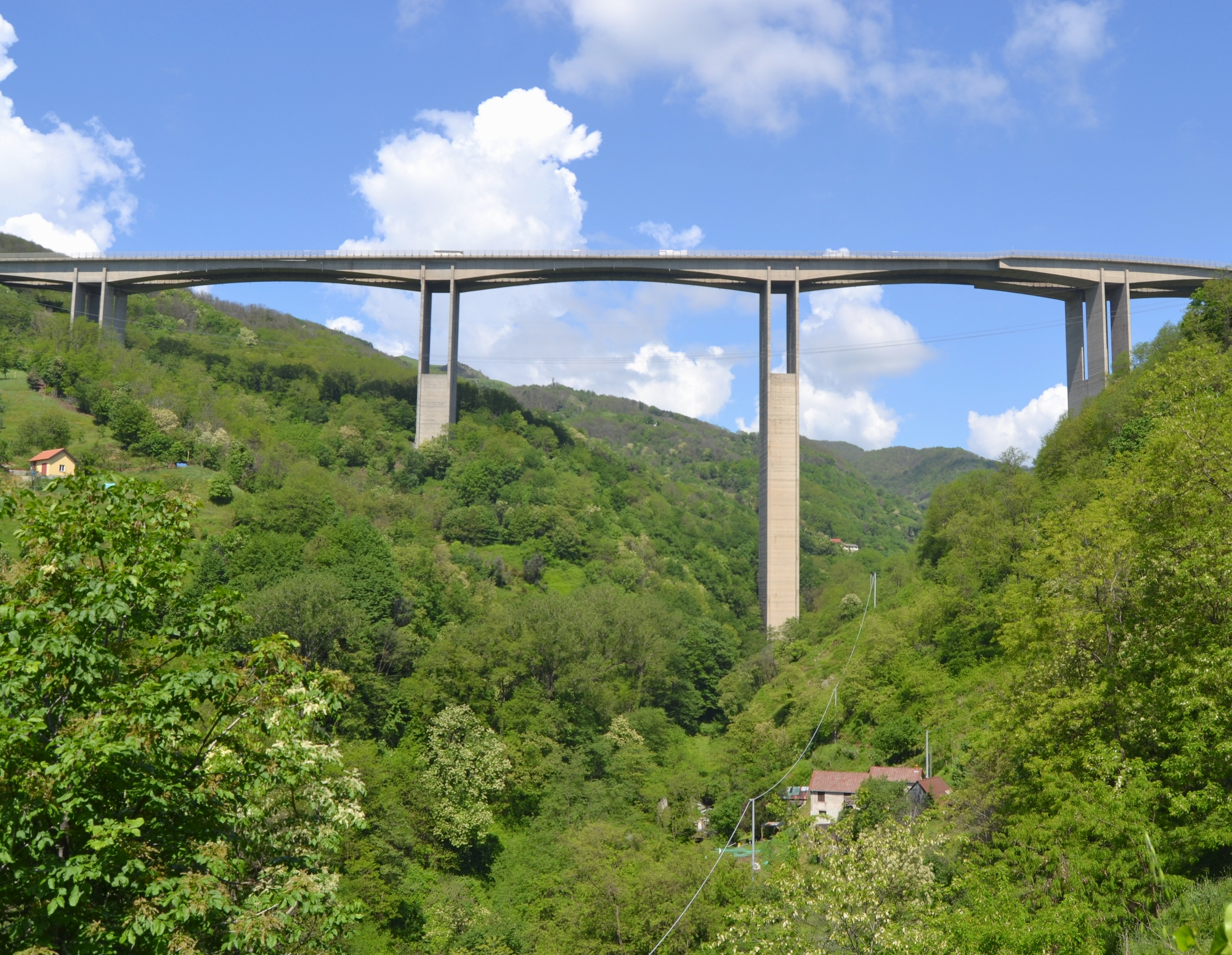
Gorsexio Viaduct

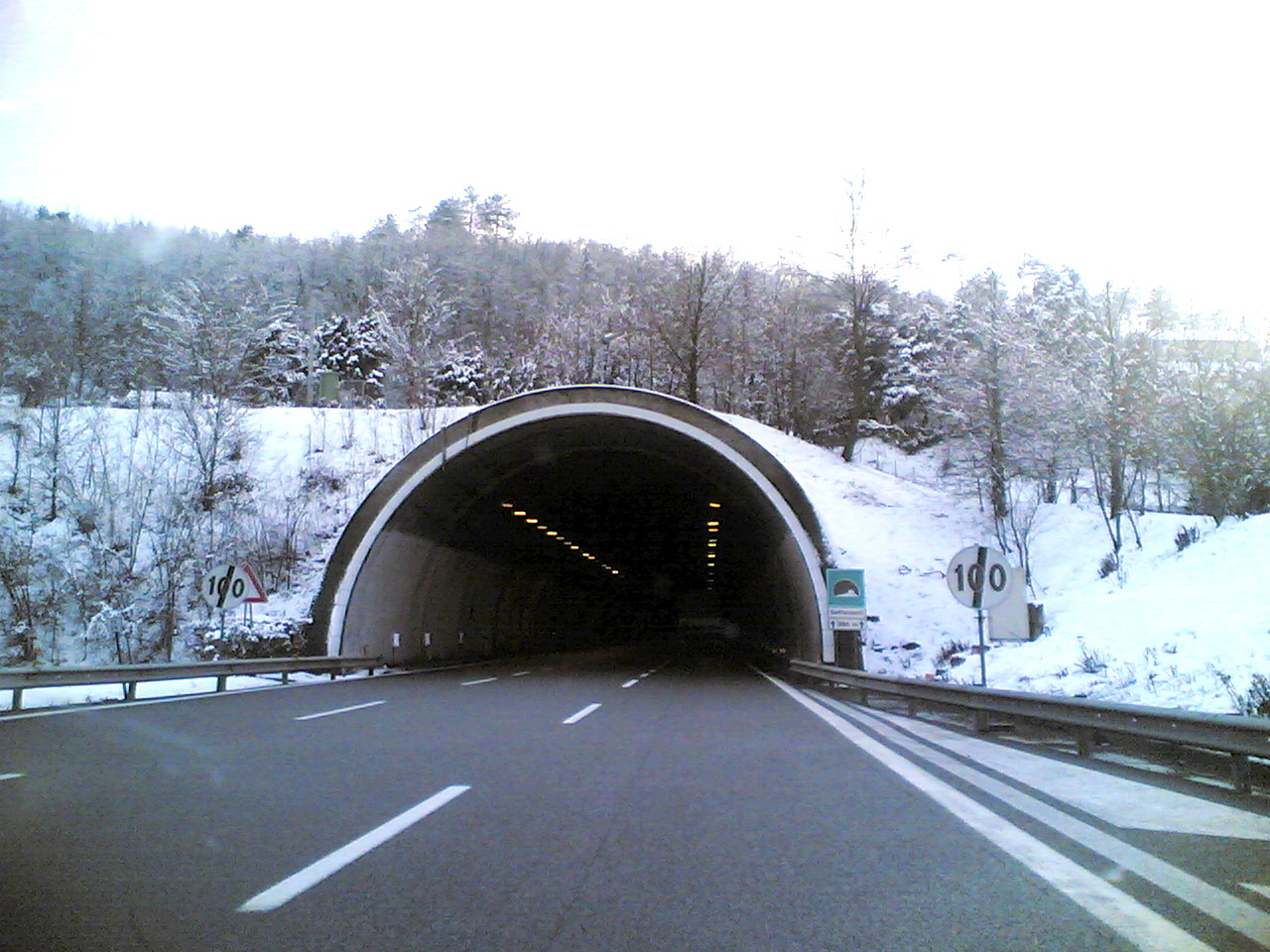
The A26 near Alessandria, heading south towards the Apennines.

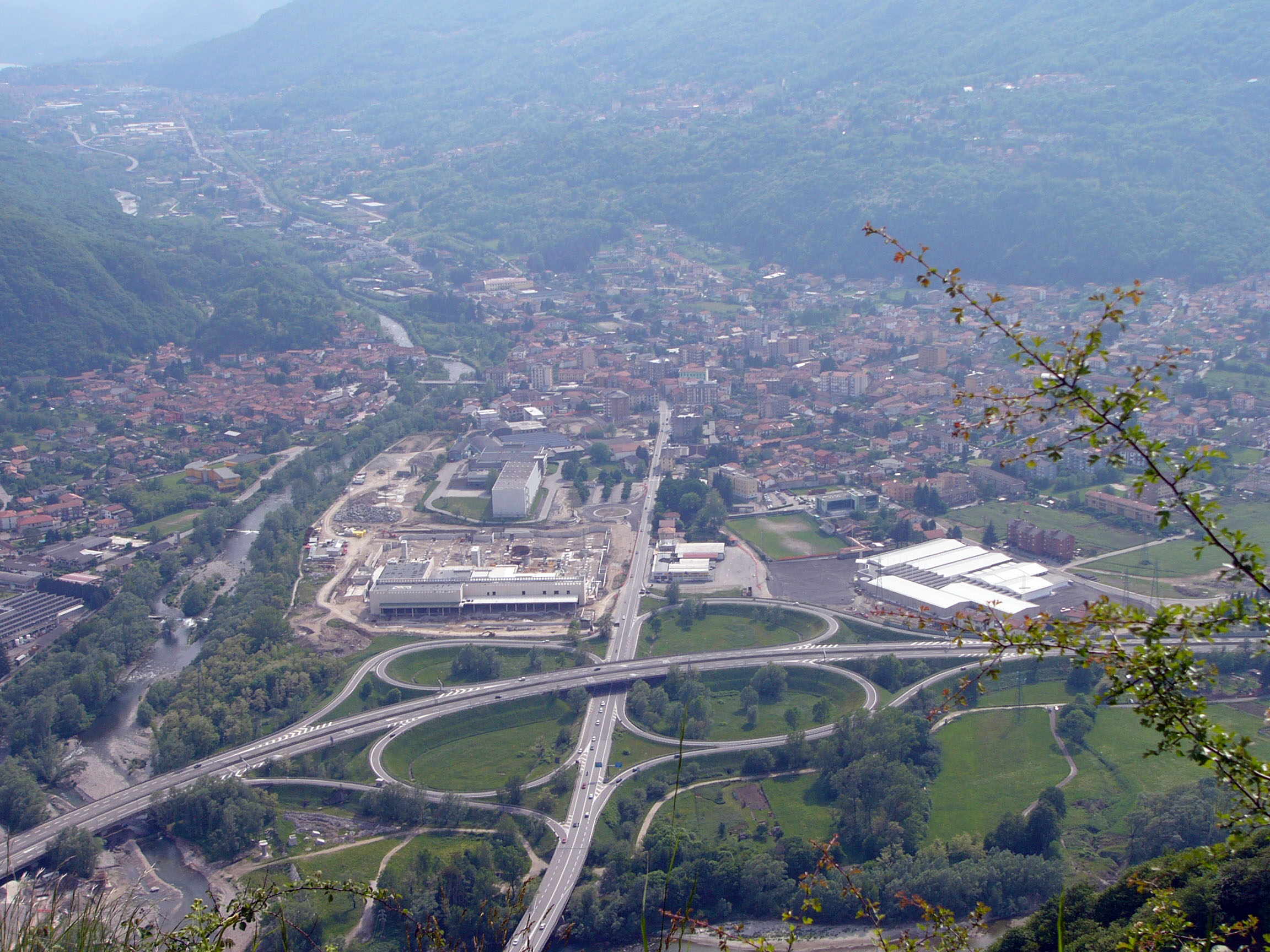
The cloverleaf junction at Gravellona Toce

The A26 begins from the Genoese town of Pra', which lies on the coast to the west of the city centre. (Note that the gate of Pra' is still wrongly named "Voltri", nevertheless, Voltri has anything to do with the motorway gate and that the City of Genova has formally asked for the change of its name in "Gate of Pra' "). It crosses the Apennines at the Passo del Turchino (532m) and passes through Ovada. Near Castelferro (frazione of Predosa) an eastern branch, the Autostrada A26/A7, provides links to Novi Ligure and to the Autostrada A7 (Genoa – Milan) which it joins near Spineto Scrivia, to the south of Tortona.

The A26 continues northwards until near Alessandria there is an interchange with the Autostrada A21 (Turin – Brescia). The road crosses the Po River just east of Casale Monferrato. South of Vercelli a western branch, the Autostrada A4/26, provides a connection to the Autostrada A4 (Turin – Trieste) near Santhià, and continues as the Autostrada A4/A5 to the Autostrada A5 (Turin – Aosta – Monte Bianco) which it joins at Pavone Canavese, just south of Ivrea.

Further north, between Greggio and Biandrate Vicolungo to the west of Novara, the A26 intersects with the Autostrada A4 (Turin – Trieste), and at Sesto Calende with the Autostrada A8. The road passes close to Romagnano Sesia and Ghemme where there is an exit for the Valsesia. It proceeds north-east and follows the shore of Lago Maggiore with exits for Arona, Brovello-Carpugnino, Baveno - Stresa, Verbania and Gravellona Toce. From here the strada statale 33 del Sempione continues the route northwards, initially as a superstrada (a form of expressway), to Domodossola and then via the Val Divedro to the Swiss border, affording access to the Simplon Pass.

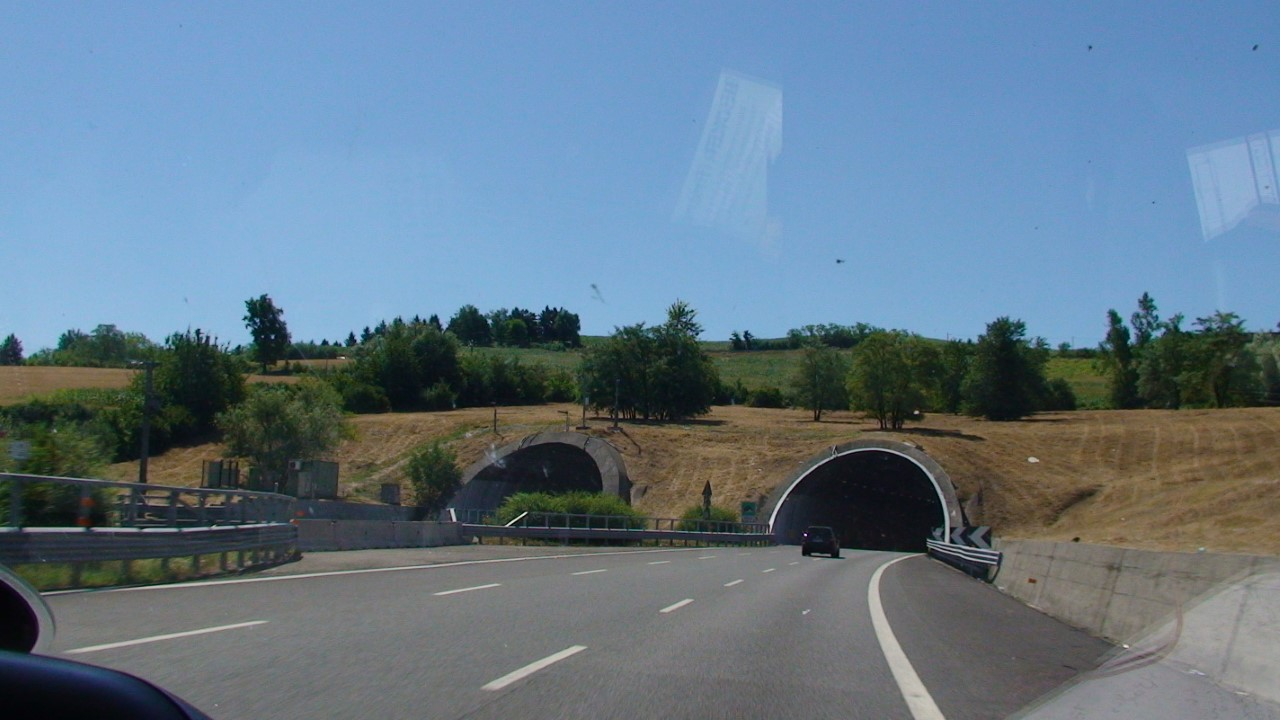
Autostrada A26 near San Salvatore Monferrato

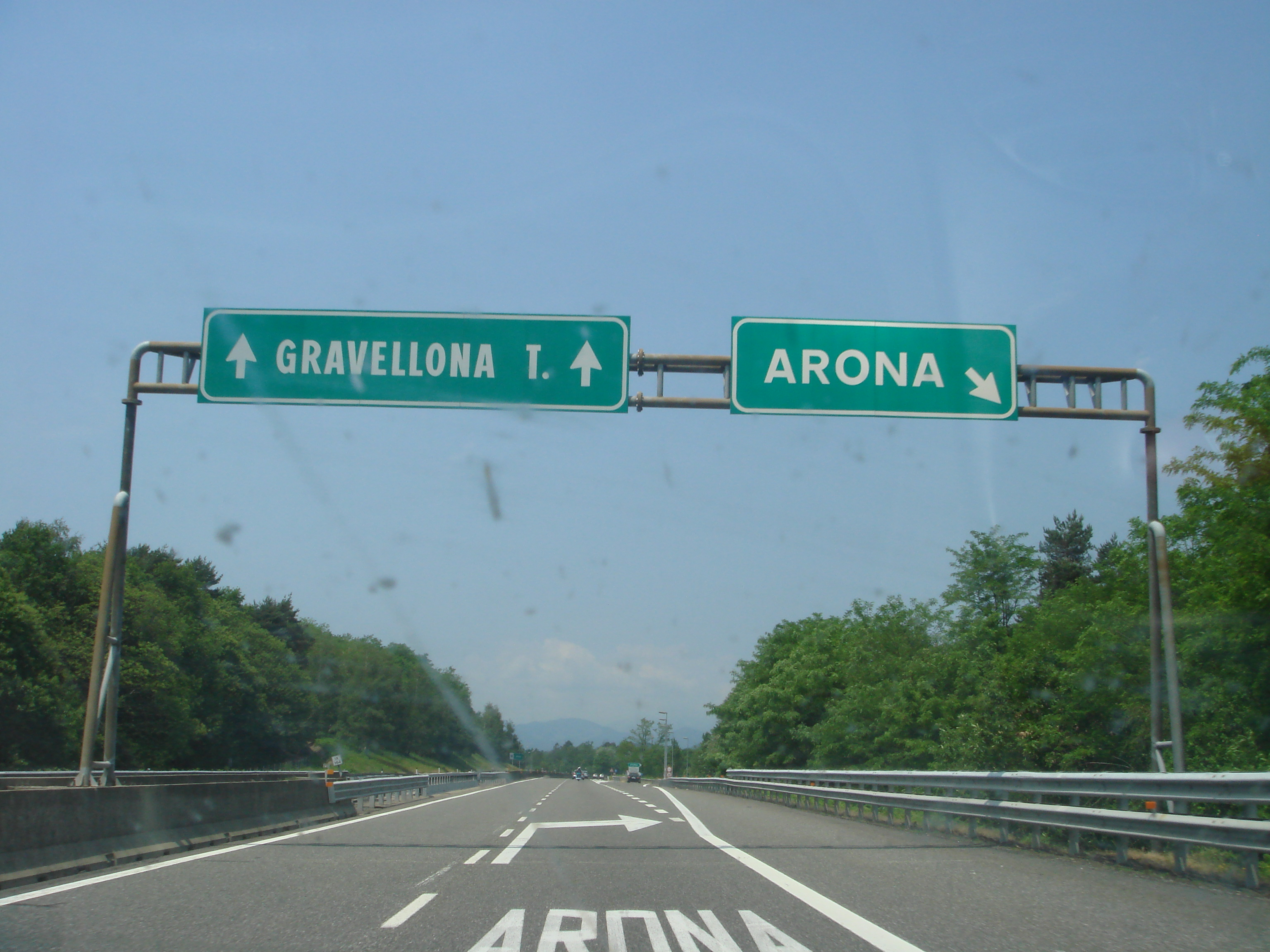
Autostrada A26 near Arona

GENOVA - GRAVELLONA TOCE; Autostrada dei Trafori
Exit	↓km↓	↑km↑	Province	European Route
Genova - Ventimiglia; Livorno	0.0 km (0 mi)	197.1 km (122.5 mi)	GE	E25
Rest area "Turchino"	6.8 km (4.2 mi)	190.2 km (118.2 mi)	GE	E25
Masone	14.0 km (8.7 mi)	183.0 km (113.7 mi)	GE	E25
Rest area "Stura"	25.5 km (15.8 mi)	171.5 km (106.6 mi)	AL	E25
Ovada	29.9 km (18.6 mi)	167.1 km (103.8 mi)	AL	E25
Diramazione Predosa - Bettole	45.2 km (28.1 mi)	151.8 km (94.3 mi)	AL	E25
Rest area "Bormida"	52.9 km (32.9 mi)	144.1 km (89.5 mi)	AL	E25
Alessandria Sud	59.5 km (37.0 mi)	137.5 km (85.4 mi)	AL	E25
Torino - Piacenza - Brescia	69.3 km (43.1 mi)	127.7 km (79.3 mi)	AL	E25
Rest area "Monferrato"	83.5 km (51.9 mi)	113.5 km (70.5 mi)	AL	E25
Casale Monferrato Sud	89.6 km (55.7 mi)	107.4 km (66.7 mi)	AL	E25
Casale Monferrato Nord	94.1 km (58.5 mi)	102.9 km (63.9 mi)	AL	E25
Diramazione Stroppiana - Santhià	107.2 km (66.6 mi)	89.8 km (55.8 mi)	VC	E25
Rest area "Sesia"	108.2 km (67.2 mi)	88.8 km (55.2 mi)	VC	
Vercelli Est	116.8 km (72.6 mi)	80.2 km (49.8 mi)	VC	
Torino - Trieste	128.5 km (79.8 mi)	68.5 km (42.6 mi)	NO	
Romagnano Sesia - Ghemme	145.1 km (90.2 mi)	51.9 km (32.2 mi)	NO	
Borgomanero	153.4 km (95.3 mi)	43.6 km (27.1 mi)	NO	
{ Rest area "Agogna"	154.8 km (96.2 mi)	42.2 km (26.2 mi)	NO	
Diramazione Gallarate - Gattico	160.2 km (99.5 mi)	34.3 km (21.3 mi)	NO	E62
Arona	165.5 km (102.8 mi)	31.5 km (19.6 mi)	NO	E62
Toll gate Lago Maggiore	166.6 km (103.5 mi)	30.4 km (18.9 mi)	NO	E62
Meina	171.1 km (106.3 mi)	25.9 km (16.1 mi)	NO	E62
Carpugnino	181.3 km (112.7 mi)	15.7 km (9.8 mi)	VB	E62
Baveno - Stresa	190.0 km (118.1 mi)	7.0 km (4.3 mi)	VB	E62
Verbania del Lago Maggiore; Lake Maggiore	194.0 km (120.5 mi)	3.0 km (1.9 mi)	VB	E62
Gravellona Toce del Lago Maggiore; Lake Orta	194.2 km (120.7 mi)	2.8 km (1.7 mi)	VB	E62
Ornavasso del Sempione	197.1 km (122.5 mi)	0.0 km (0 mi)	VB	E62

=== A7/A26 Bettole-Predosa connection ===
Autostrada A7-A26
- Location: Bettole – Predosa Link
- Length: 17 km (11 mi)

The Autostrada A7/A26 Diramazione Bettole-Predosa (A7/A26) is a 17 km motorway which links the A26 near Predosa with the Autostrada A7 near Bettole (a frazione of Pozzolo Formigaro). The entire autostrada is within the Province of Alessandria. Its sole exit is for Novi Ligure and it provides a convenient means of access to both the A7 and the A26 from that town.

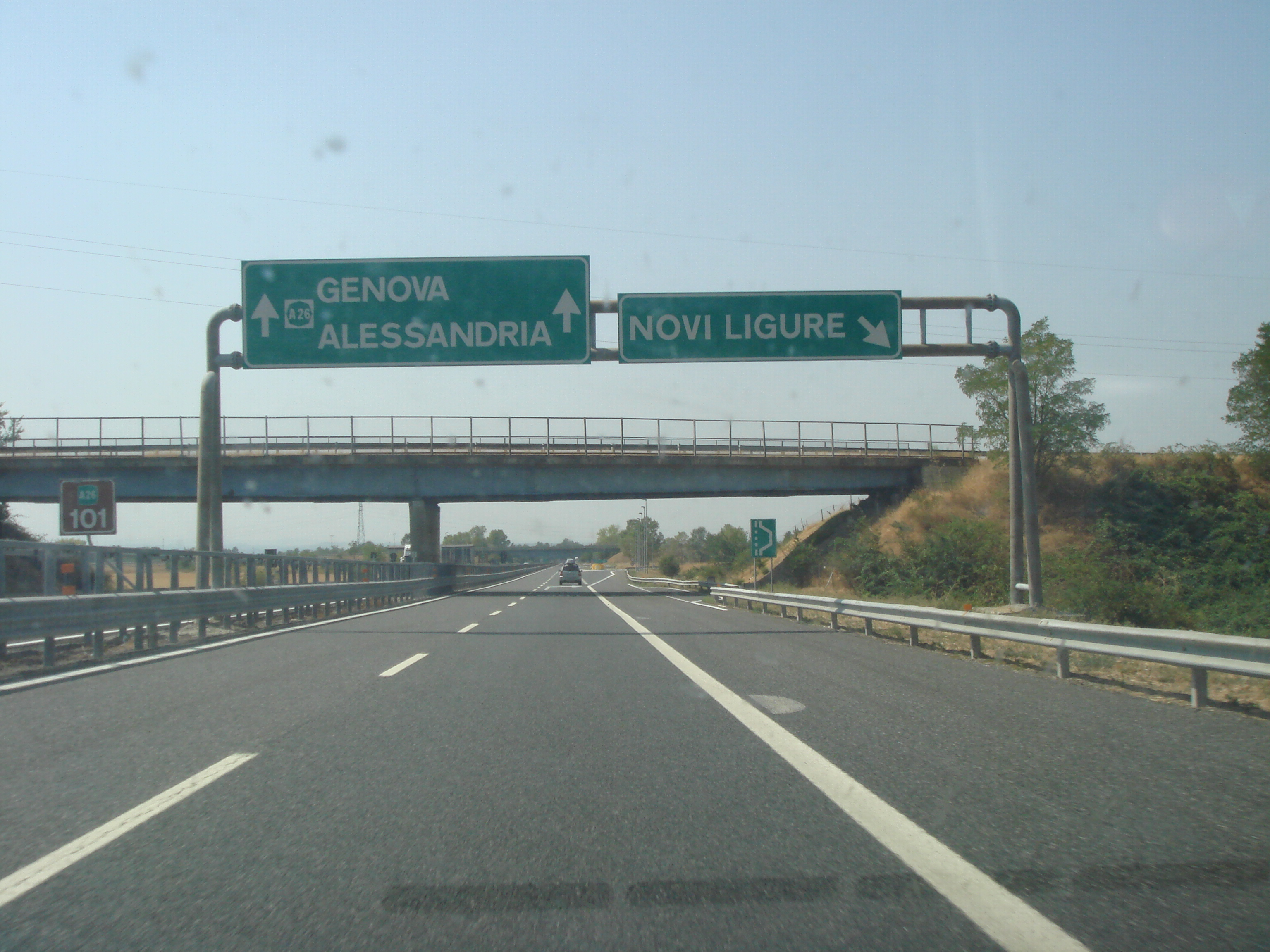
A7/A26 Bettole-Predosa connection near Novi Ligure

AUTOSTRADA A26/A7; A7/A26 Bettole-Predosa connection
Exit	↓km↓	↑km↑	Province	European route
Genova - Gravellona Toce	0.0 km (0 mi)	17.0 km (10.6 mi)	AL	--
Novi Ligure	7.9 km (4.9 mi)	9.1 km (5.7 mi)	AL	--
Rest area "Marengo"	9.7 km (6.0 mi)	7.3 km (4.5 mi)	AL	--
Milano - Genova	17.0 km (10.6 mi)	0.0 km (0 mi)	AL	--

=== A4/A26 Stroppiana-Santhià connection ===
Autostrada A4-A26
- Location: Stroppiana-Santhià Link
- Length: 30.7 km (19.1 mi)

The Autostrada A4/A26 Diramazione Stroppiana-Santhià (A4/A26) is a 32 km motorway which links the A26 near Stroppiana with the Autostrada A4 near Santhià. It forms part of the 1,547 km European route E25 which connects Hook of Holland in the Netherlands to Palermo in Sicily. The layout of the road is level with two lanes in each direction.

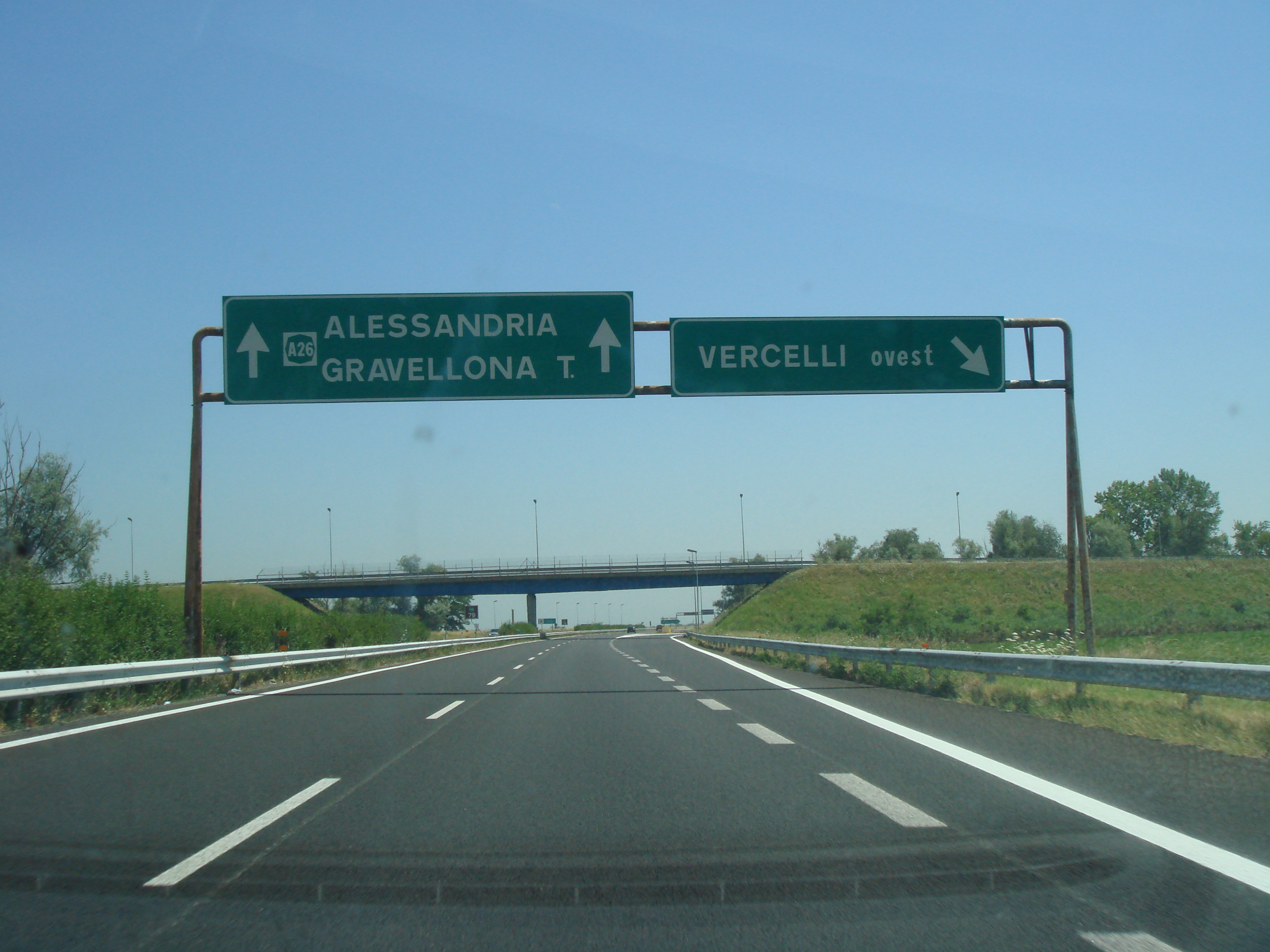
A4/A26 Stroppiana-Santhià connection near Vercelli

AUTOSTRADA A4/A26; A4/A26 Stroppiana-Santhià connection
Exit	↓km↓	↑km↑	Province	European route
Genova - Gravellona Toce	0.0 km (0 mi)	30.7 km (19.1 mi)	VC	E25
Rest area "Le Risaie" (Note: Only in the direction of Alessandria-Gravellona Toce)	-	29.3 km (18.2 mi)	VC	E25
Vercelli Ovest	8.0 km (5.0 mi)	22.7 km (14.1 mi)	VC	E25
Rest area "Cavour" (Note: Only in the direction of Genoa.)	29.0 km (18.0 mi)	-	VC	E25
Torino - Milano; Santhià	30.6 km (19.0 mi)	0.1 km (0.062 mi)	VC	E25
A4/5 Ivrea; Torino - Aosta	30.7 km (19.1 mi)	0.0 km (0 mi)	VC	E25

=== A8/A26 Gallarate-Gattico connection ===
Autostrada A8-A26
- Location: Gallarate-Gattico Link
- Length: 24 km (15 mi)

The Autostrada A8/A26 Diramazione Gallarate-Gattico (A8/A26) is a motorway which connects the A26 near Gattico with the Autostrada A8 near Gallarate. It forms part of the 1,290 km European route E62 which connects Nantes in western France to Genova. The road was built to provide a route for traffic from Domodossola and the Simplon Pass to Milan and thence to the parts of the peninsula to the east of the Apennines. It has two lanes in each direction from Gallarate to Sesto Calende and three from Sesto Calende to Gattico.

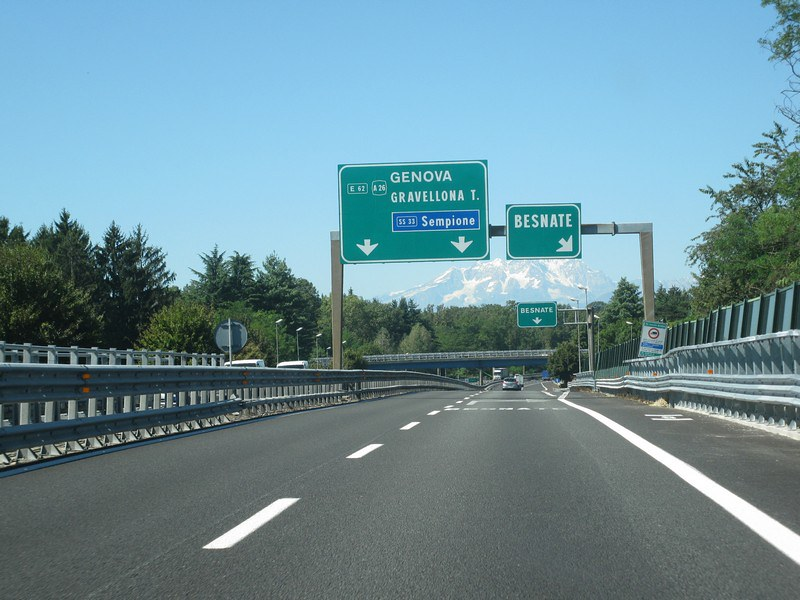
A8/A26 Gallarate-Gattico connection near Besnate

AUTOSTRADA A8/A26; Gallarate - Gattico connection
Exit	↓km↓	↑km↑	Province	European route
Milano - Varese	0.0 km (0 mi)	24.0 km (14.9 mi)	VA	E62
Toll gate Gallarate Ovest	2.5 km (1.6 mi)	21.5 km (13.4 mi)	VA	E62
Besnate	4.0 km (2.5 mi)	20.0 km (12.4 mi)	VA	E62
Rest area "Verbano"	6.1 km (3.8 mi)	17.9 km (11.1 mi)	VA	E62
Sesto Calende - Vergiate del Sempione: Lake Maggiore del Lago di Monate: Lake Monate	11.9 km (7.4 mi)	12.1 km (7.5 mi)	VA	E62
Castelletto Ticino; Ticinese del Sempione: Lake Maggiore	17.9 km (11.1 mi)	6.1 km (3.8 mi)	NO	E62
Genova - Gravellona Toce	24.0 km (14.9 mi)	0.0 km (0 mi)	NO	E62

== See also ==
- Autostrade of Italy
- Roads in Italy
- Transport in Italy
- A24

=== Other Italian roads ===
- State highways (Italy)
- Regional road (Italy)
- Provincial road (Italy)
- Municipal road (Italy)
