= European route E612 =

Road in trans-European E-road network

E612

Route information
- Length: 54 km (34 mi)

Major junctions
- From: Ivrea
- To: Turin

Location
- Countries: Italy

Highway system
- International E-road network; A Class; B Class

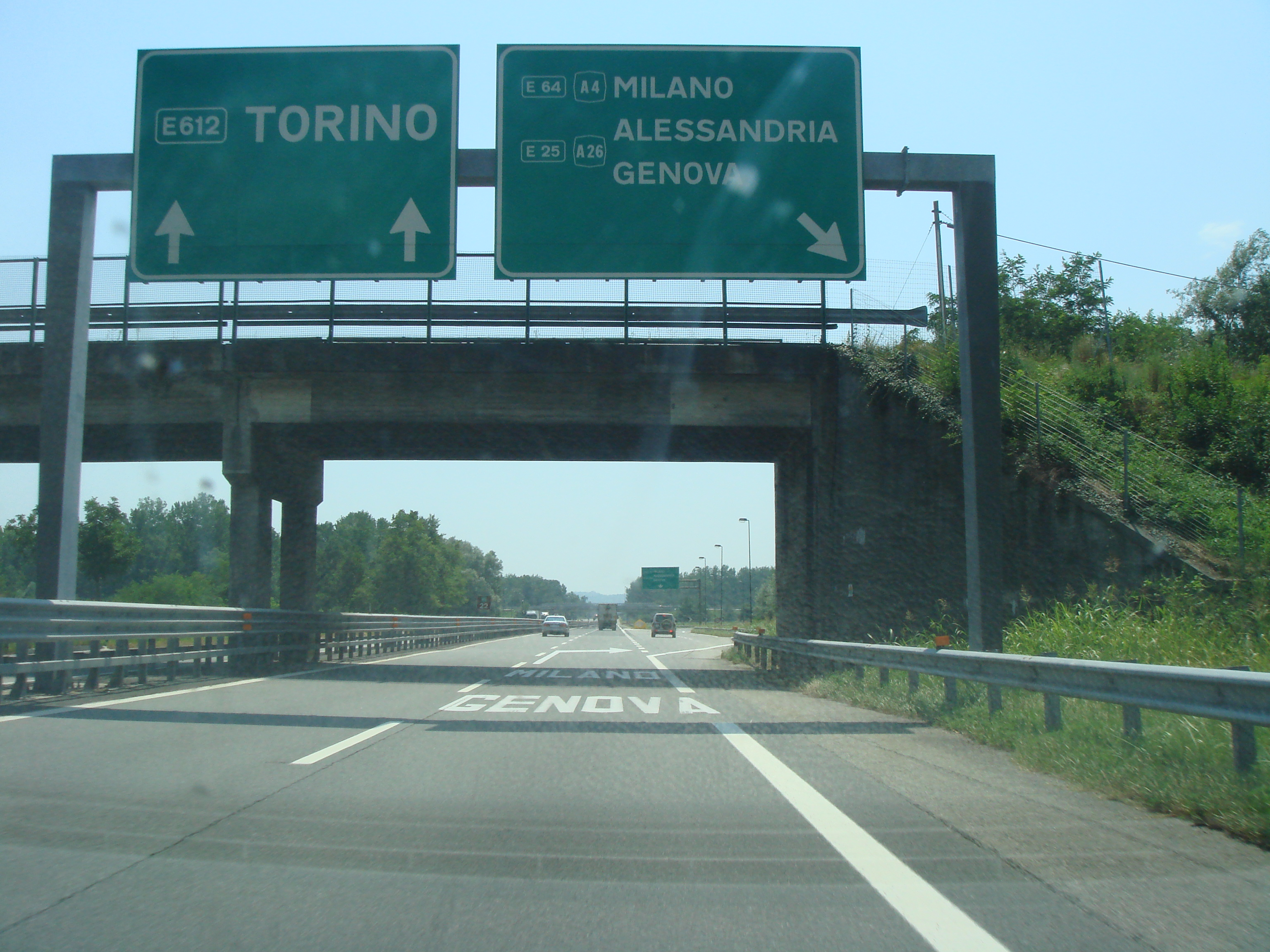
European route 612 near Ivrea

European route E 612 is a European B class road in Italy, connecting the cities Ivrea – Turin

== Route ==
- Italy
  - E25 Ivrea
  - E70, E64, E717 Turin
