= Rondissone =

- Comune
- Comune di Rondissone
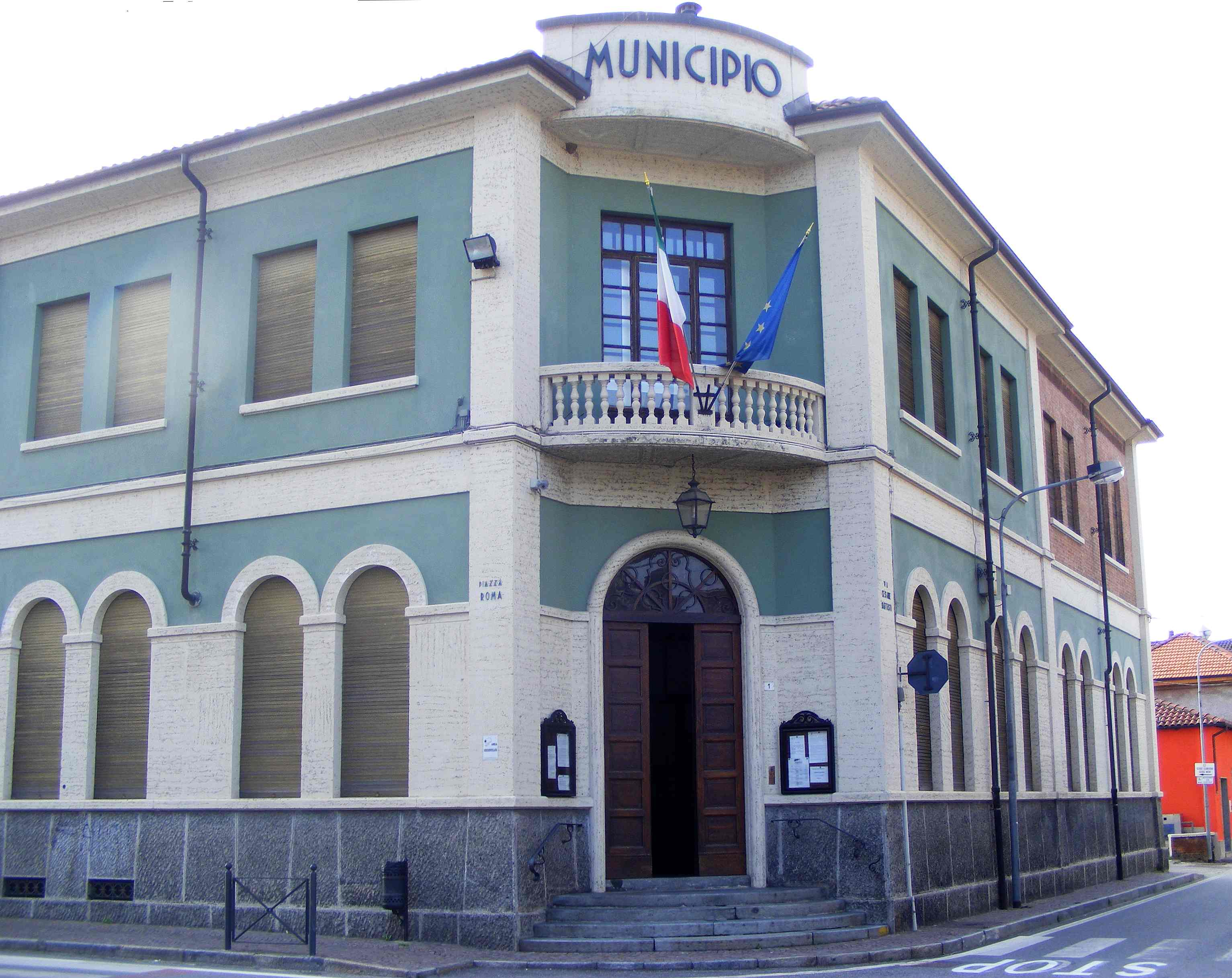
- Town hall.

- Coat of arms

- Location within Italy Location within Piedmont
- Coordinates: 45°15′N 7°58′E
- Country: Italy
- Region: Piedmont
- Metropolitan city: Turin (TO)

Government
  - Mayor: Miriam Piva De Ros

Area
  - Total: 10.65 km^{2} (4.11 sq mi)
- Elevation: 211 m (692 ft)

Population (31 December 2010)
  - Total: 1,843
  - Density: 173.1/km^{2} (448.2/sq mi)
- Demonym: Rondissonesi
- Time zone: UTC+1 (CET)
  - Summer (DST): UTC+2 (CEST)
- Postal code: 10030
- Dialing code: 011
- Website: Official website

Rondissone is a comune (municipality) in the Metropolitan City of Turin in the Italian region Piedmont, located about 30 kilometres (19 miles) northeast of Turin.
