= European route E64 =

Road in trans-European E-road network

E64

Route information
- Length: 246 km (153 mi)

Major junctions
- West end: Turin
- East end: Brescia

Location
- Countries: Italy

Highway system
- International E-road network; A Class; B Class

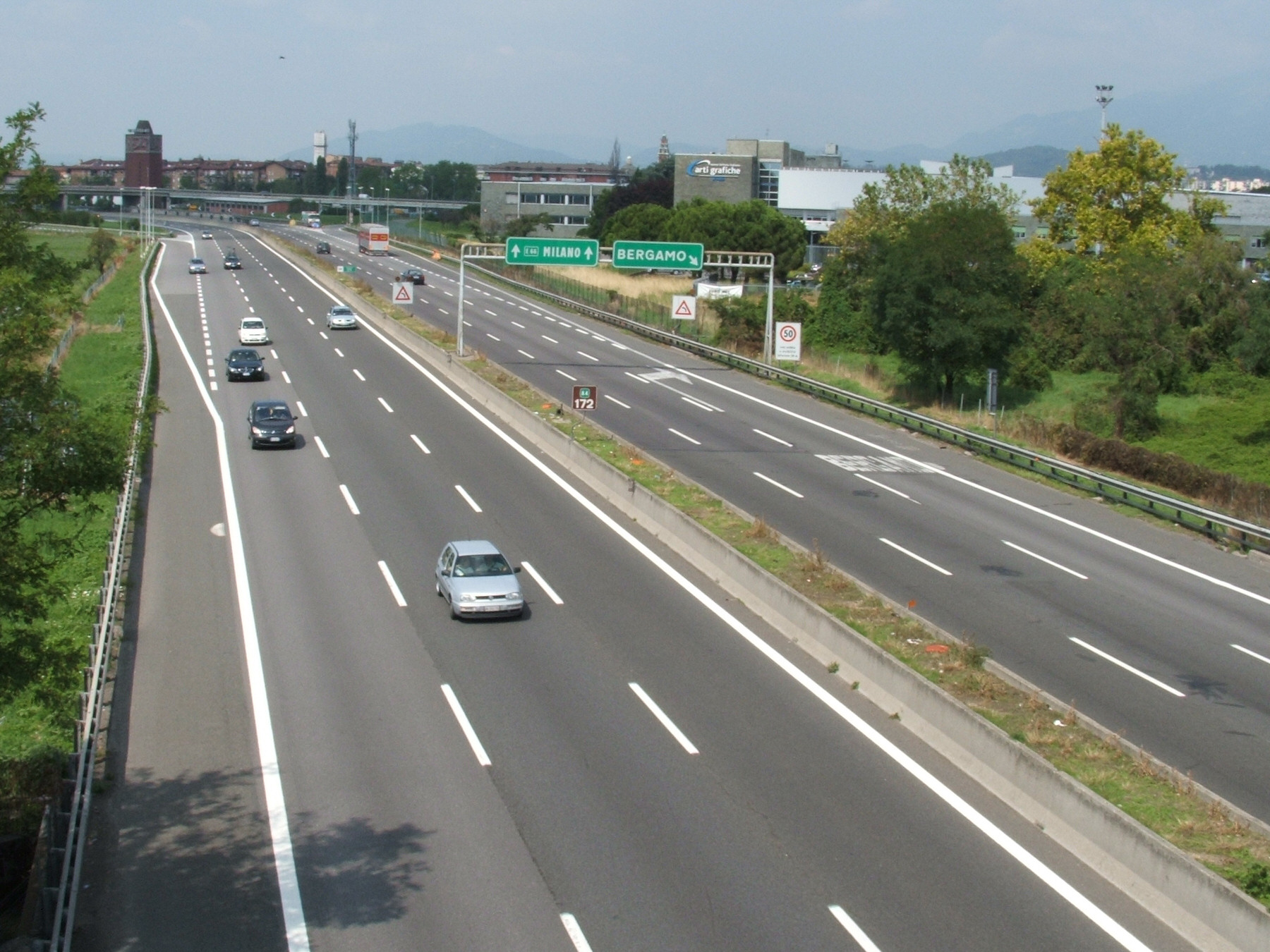
The E 64 near Bergamo.

European route E 64 is a series of roads in Italy, part of the United Nations International E-road network.

It runs from Turin to Brescia, both in Italy.

Firstly it leaves Turin (in Piedmont), heading northeast into Lombardy and passing through Milan. It then continues north-east until it reaches its final destination of Brescia.

== Connections with other E-roads ==
- At Turin, it connects to the E 70, the E 612, and the E 717.
- Upon reaching Milan, it makes a connection to both the E 35 and the E 62.
- When it finishes at Brescia, it links with European Route E 70.
