= Santhià =

Santhià Santià / Santcià (Piedmontese)
- Comune
- Comune di Santhià
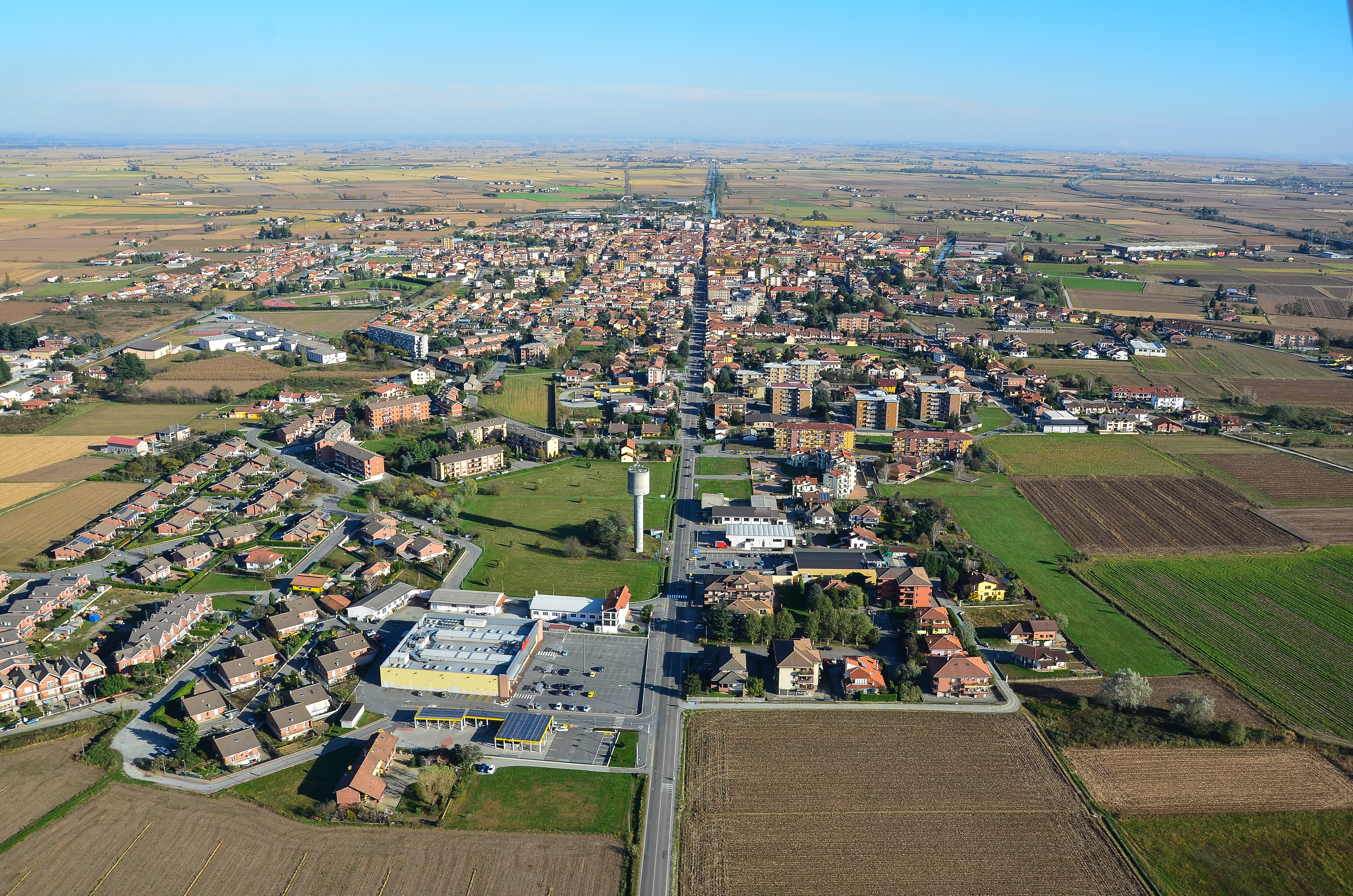
- Aeral view

- Location within Italy Location within Piedmont
- Coordinates: 45°22′N 8°10′E
- Country: Italy
- Region: Piedmont
- Province: Vercelli (VC)
- Frazioni: Bosafarinera; Vettigné

Government
  - Mayor: Angela Ariotti

Area
  - Total: 53.13 km^{2} (20.51 sq mi)
- Elevation: 183 m (600 ft)

Population (30 November 2025)
  - Total: 8,002
  - Density: 150.6/km^{2} (390.1/sq mi)
- Demonym: Santhiatesi
- Time zone: UTC+1 (CET)
  - Summer (DST): UTC+2 (CEST)
- Postal code: 13048
- Dialing code: 0161
- ISTAT code: 002133
- Patron saint: St. Agatha
- Saint day: February 5
- Website: Official website

Santhià (Italian pronunciation: [sanˈtja]; Piedmontese: Santià [saŋˈtjɑ] or Santcià [saŋˈtʃɑ]) is a comune (municipality) in the province of Vercelli in the Italian region Piedmont, located about 50 kilometres (31 mi) northeast of Turin and about 20 kilometres (12 mi) northwest of Vercelli.

Santhià is home to a historic carnival named the Carnevale Storico di Santhià, held since the 14th century.

== Main sights ==
- Castle of Vettigné, built starting from the 15th century.
- Romanesque-Neoclassic collegiate church of Sant'Agata, built from the 11th century. It includes a 12th-century Romanesque crypt.

== People ==
- Ignatius of Santhià (1686–1770), member of the Order of Friars Minor Capuchin, canonized by Pope John Paul II in 2002.
- Jacques-Germain Chaudes-Aigues (1814–1847), French journalist and literary critic, was born in Santhià.
- Ugo Nespolo, artist, was made an honorary citizen of Santhià on Saturday 31 March 2012.
