= List of highways numbered 10 =

Route 10, or Highway 10, can refer to routes in the following countries:

== International ==
- E10 European route E10
- E010 European route E010

== Argentina ==
- La Pampa Provincial Route 10

== Australia ==
=== Queensland ===
- Smith Street Motorway (Queensland)
- Scenic Highway (Queensland)

=== South Australia ===
- Adelaide–Mannum Road

=== Tasmania ===
- Lyell Highway, Zeehan Highway, Murchison Highway, Tasmania

== Austria ==
- Tauern Autobahn

== Brazil ==
- BR-010

== Cameroon ==
- Route 10

== Canada ==
- Alberta Highway 10
- British Columbia Highway 10
- Manitoba Highway 10
- New Brunswick Route 10
- Newfoundland and Labrador Route 10
- Northwest Territories Highway 10 (Inuvik-Tuktoyaktuk Highway)
- Nova Scotia Trunk 10
- Ontario Highway 10
- Prince Edward Island Route 10
- Quebec Autoroute 10
- Quebec Route 10 (former)
- Saskatchewan Highway 10
- Yukon Highway 10

== China ==
- G10 Expressway

== Costa Rica ==
- National Route 10

== Cuba ==
- Highway 2–10

== Czech Republic ==
- D10 Motorway
- I/10 Highway; Czech: Silnice I/10

== Greece ==
- EO10 road

== Hong Kong ==
- Route 10 (Hong Kong)

== Hungary ==
- M10 expressway (Hungary)
- Main road 10 (Hungary)

== India ==
- National Highway 10 (India)
- State Highway 10 (Maharashtra)

== Iraq ==
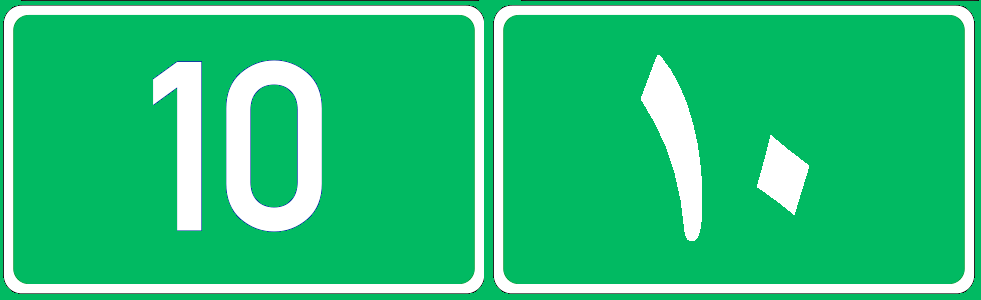
- Highway 10 (Iraq)

== Israel ==
- Highway 10 (Israel)

== Ireland ==
- N10 road (Ireland)

== Italy ==
- Autostrada A10
- RA 10

== Japan ==
- Japan National Route 10
- Higashikyushu Expressway
- Miyazaki Expressway

== Jordan ==
- Highway 10

== Korea, South ==
- Namhae Expressway
- National Route 10

== Malaysia ==
- New Pantai Expressway
- FT 10 Malaysia Federal Route 10
- A10 Perak State Route A10
- B10 Selangor State Route B10
- J10 Johor State Route J10
- M10 Malacca State Route M10
- P10 Penang State Route P10

== New Zealand ==
- New Zealand State Highway 10

== Nigeria ==
- A10 highway (Nigeria)

== Paraguay ==
- National Route 10

== Philippines ==
- N10 highway (Philippines)

== Romania ==
- Drumul Naţional 10
- A10 motorway (Romania)

== Russia ==
- M10 highway (Russia)

== Saudi Arabia ==
- Highway 10 (Saudi Arabia)

== South Africa ==
- N10 road (South Africa)

== Turkey ==
- State road D.010 (Turkey)

== United Kingdom ==
- M10 motorway (Great Britain) (Former)
- A10 road

== United States ==
- Interstate 10
  - Interstate 10 Business
- U.S. Route 10
  - U.S. Route 10S (Montana) (former)
  - U.S. Route 10S (Minnesota) (former)
  - U.S. Route 10N (Montana) (former)
  - U.S. Route 10N (Minnesota) (former)
- New England Interstate Route 10 (former)
- Alabama State Route 10
  - County Route 10 (Lee County, Alabama)
- Alaska Route 10
- County Route 10 (Mohave County, Arizona)
- Arkansas Highway 10
- California State Route 10 (former)
  - County Route A10 (California)
  - County Route E10 (California)
  - County Route G10 (California)
  - County Route J10 (California)
  - County Route S10 (California)
- Colorado State Highway 10
- Connecticut Route 10
- Delaware Route 10
- Florida State Road 10
- Georgia State Route 10
- Hawaii Route 10 (former)
- Illinois Route 10
- Indiana State Road 10
- Iowa Highway 10
- K-10 (Kansas highway)
- Kentucky Route 10
- Louisiana Highway 10
- Maine State Route 10
- Maryland Route 10
- Massachusetts Route 10
- M-10 (Michigan highway)
- Minnesota State Highway 10 (1920–1933) (former)
- Missouri Route 10
- Nebraska Highway 10
- Nevada State Route 10 (former)
- New Hampshire Route 10
- New Jersey Route 10
  - New Jersey Route 10N (former)
  - County Route 10 (Monmouth County, New Jersey)
- New York State Route 10
  - County Route 10 (Albany County, New York)
  - County Route 10 (Allegany County, New York)
  - County Route 10 (Cattaraugus County, New York)
  - County Route 10B (Cayuga County, New York)
    - County Route 10C (Cayuga County, New York)
  - County Route 10 (Chemung County, New York)
  - County Route 10 (Chenango County, New York)
  - County Route 10 (Columbia County, New York)
  - County Route 10 (Dutchess County, New York)
  - County Route 10 (Franklin County, New York)
  - County Route 10 (Genesee County, New York)
  - County Route 10 (Niagara County, New York)
  - County Route 10 (Oneida County, New York)
  - County Route 10 (Ontario County, New York)
  - County Route 10 (Orange County, New York)
  - County Route 10 (Oswego County, New York)
  - County Route 10 (Putnam County, New York)
  - County Route 10 (Schenectady County, New York)
  - County Route 10 (Schuyler County, New York)
  - County Route 10 (St. Lawrence County, New York)
  - County Route 10 (Suffolk County, New York)
  - County Route 10 (Ulster County, New York)
  - County Route 10 (Wyoming County, New York)
  - County Route 10 (Yates County, New York)
- North Carolina Highway 10
- North Dakota Highway 10
- Ohio State Route 10
- Oklahoma State Highway 10
  - Oklahoma State Highway 10C
- Oregon Route 10
- Pennsylvania Route 10
- Rhode Island Route 10
- South Carolina Highway 10
- South Dakota Highway 10
- Tennessee State Route 10
- Texas State Highway 10
  - Texas State Highway Loop 10 (former)
  - Texas State Highway Spur 10
  - Farm to Market Road 10
  - Texas Park Road 10
  - Texas Recreational Road 10
- Utah State Route 10
- Vermont Route 10
- Virginia State Route 10
- Washington State Route 10
  - Primary State Highway 10 (Washington) (former)
- West Virginia Route 10
- Wisconsin Highway 10 (former)
- Wyoming Highway 10

Territories

- Guam Highway 10
- Puerto Rico Highway 10
- U.S. Virgin Islands Highway 10

== Uruguay ==
- Route 10 Juan Díaz de Solís

== Zambia ==
- M10 road (Zambia)

== See also ==
- List of A10 roads
- List of highways numbered 10A

Preceded by 9	Lists of highways 10	Succeeded by 11
