= Autostrada A6 (Italy) =

Controlled-access highway in Italy

Autostrada A6
- La Verdemare; Green sea motorway

Route information
- Part of E717
- Maintained by ANAS
- Length: 124.3 km (77.2 mi)
- Existed: 1960–present

Major junctions
- From: Turin
- A55 in Turin; A33 in Marene; A33 in Cuneo; A10 in Savona
- To: Savona

Location
- Country: Italy
- Regions: Piedmont, Liguria

Highway system
- Roads in Italy; Autostrade; State; Regional; Provincial; Municipal
← A 5	→ A 7

The Autostrada A6 or La Verdemare (lit. 'Green sea motorway') is an autostrada (Italian for 'motorway') 124.3 kilometres (77.2 mi) long in Italy located in the regions of Piedmont and Liguria which connects Turin, the southernmost area of Piedmont, especially the province of Cuneo, to the west coast of Liguria and the city of Savona. It opened in 1960, and its construction finished in 2001, when it was completely overhauled into a two-road motorway. It is a part of the E717 European route.

== History ==
=== Construction ===
The motorway was built in stages starting in 1956. It began with the Savona – Ceva stretch being inaugurated on 27 January 1960. Work began shortly after in 1961 on the Ceva – Fossano stretch, including a connection to the city of Fossano and to the SS 28 for Turin. In May 1970, the Moncalieri – La Rotta section opened, followed by the Marene – Fossano stretch in July of the same year. Finally, in 1972, the initial Turin – Moncalieri – La Rotta section was built, with a separate roadway to Carmagnola.

=== The Fiat track ===
In 1972, a second roadway was put into operation in direction to Savona. This roadway was located in the stretch between Carmagnola and the Rio Coloré West service area. This roadway, also called FIAT pista di Marene, was used exclusively as a test track for higher speeds, with a sign limiting speed to 230 kph. The track began three kilometers (approximately 1.86 miles) from the Carmagnola junction, with the terminal square being just before the service area. There is also a square that was used as a technical track at overpass number 33, just 25.400 km in. The Lancia Stratos Group 5 and later the Fiat Uno Group A were tested. Claudio Maglioli was known to have used the track to try to bring a Lancia LC2 to the record speed of 387 km/h in preparation for the Le Mans race.

=== Dangers and safety concerns ===
The single roadway of the highway was considered very dangerous from marker 13 to 110 km, as the middle lane was used regularly for passing by both directions. Head-on collisions were common, with 91 incidents and three deaths in 1971 alone. For this, the highway was dubbed the "highway of death". At one point in 1980, the number of fatal accidents was so high, judicial authorities ordered the closure of the highway in the Ceva – Altare section towards Savona. This was ordered on 17 July 1980; not long after, on 1 October that year, the highway was reopened. The central passing lane was removed, and the speed limit was lowered to 70 km/h.

=== Doubling ===
In 1973, the doubling of Savona – Altare began, with the inauguration being in 1976. Later on in 1989, plans to double the stretch from Priero to Altare began. Work began in December 1993 and ended in July 1995. Four exits ceased use: Moncalieri "La Rotta" at the 3 km marker, the Vicoforte sanctuary at 67 km, Montezemolo at 92 km, and Carcare.

Sections of the plain were affected by works starting from Carmagnola using the sediment from the FIAT track. This began in 1991 and ended in 2001, which was also the end of the entire doubling plan.

=== The highway today ===
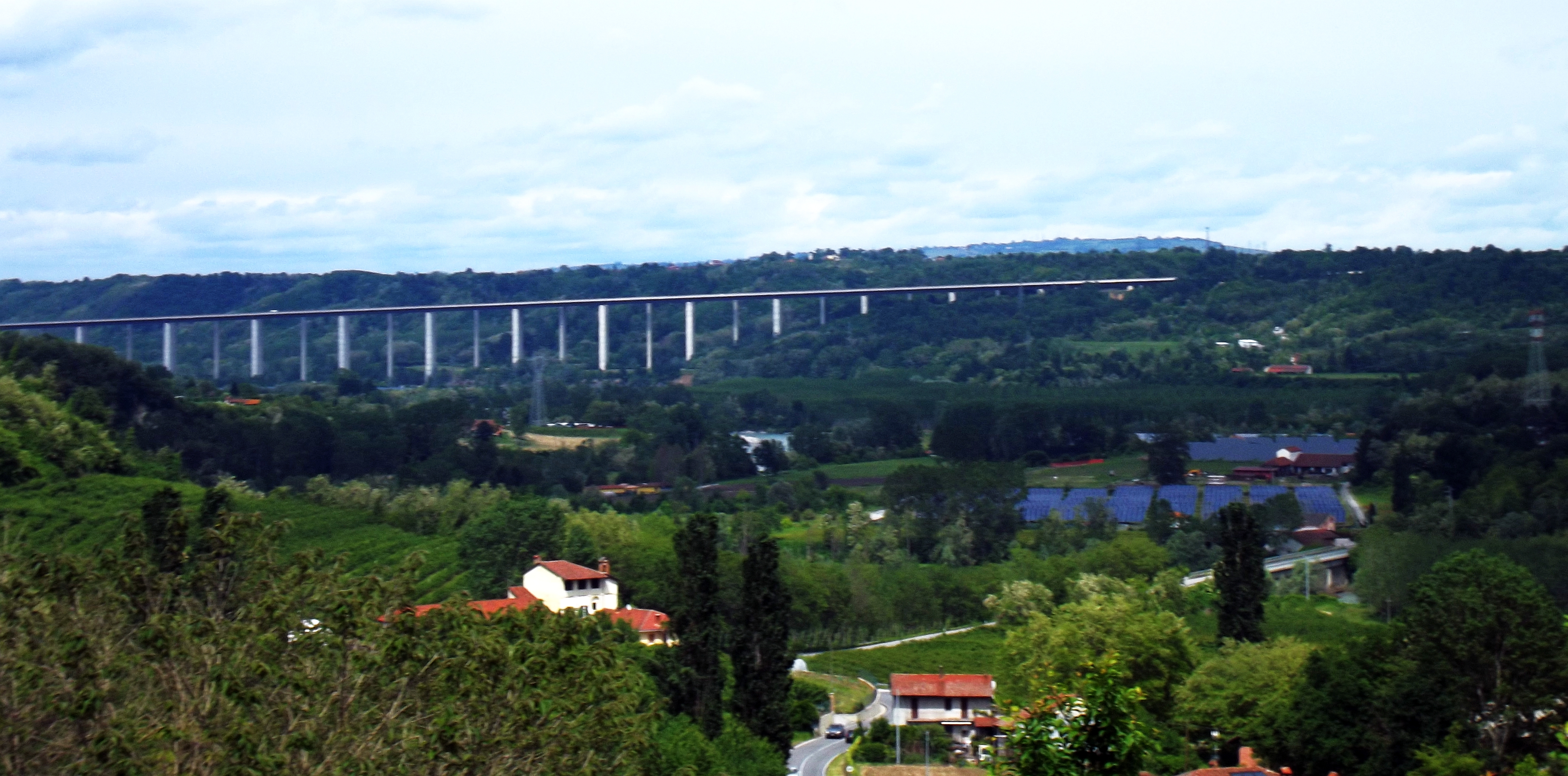
The bridge over the Stura river seen from Fossano

Since 2001, the A6, known as "La Verdemare", has safety regulations similar to main Italian roadways. The system develops through landscapes and open territories, such as the border between Piedmont and Liguria, most notably the Savona – Altare Apennine stretch. The A6 also passes the Colle di Cadibona at 435m, a watershed between the Ligurian Apennines and the Po Valley in 14 km with an uninterrupted route of tunnels and viaducts and, exclusive to Italy, a helical curve in the south roadway.

The A6 is also connected to the new Autostrada A33 Asti – Cuneo. The Asti East tollgate of the A21 Turin – Piacenza – Brescia will take travellers through Alba to the tollgate of the A6.

The concessionary company is Autostrada dei Fiori, which is controlled by SIAS (Gavio group).

The entire route coincides with the European road E717 and, at the junction for Fossano, branches off to a link that leads to the SS28.

== Route ==
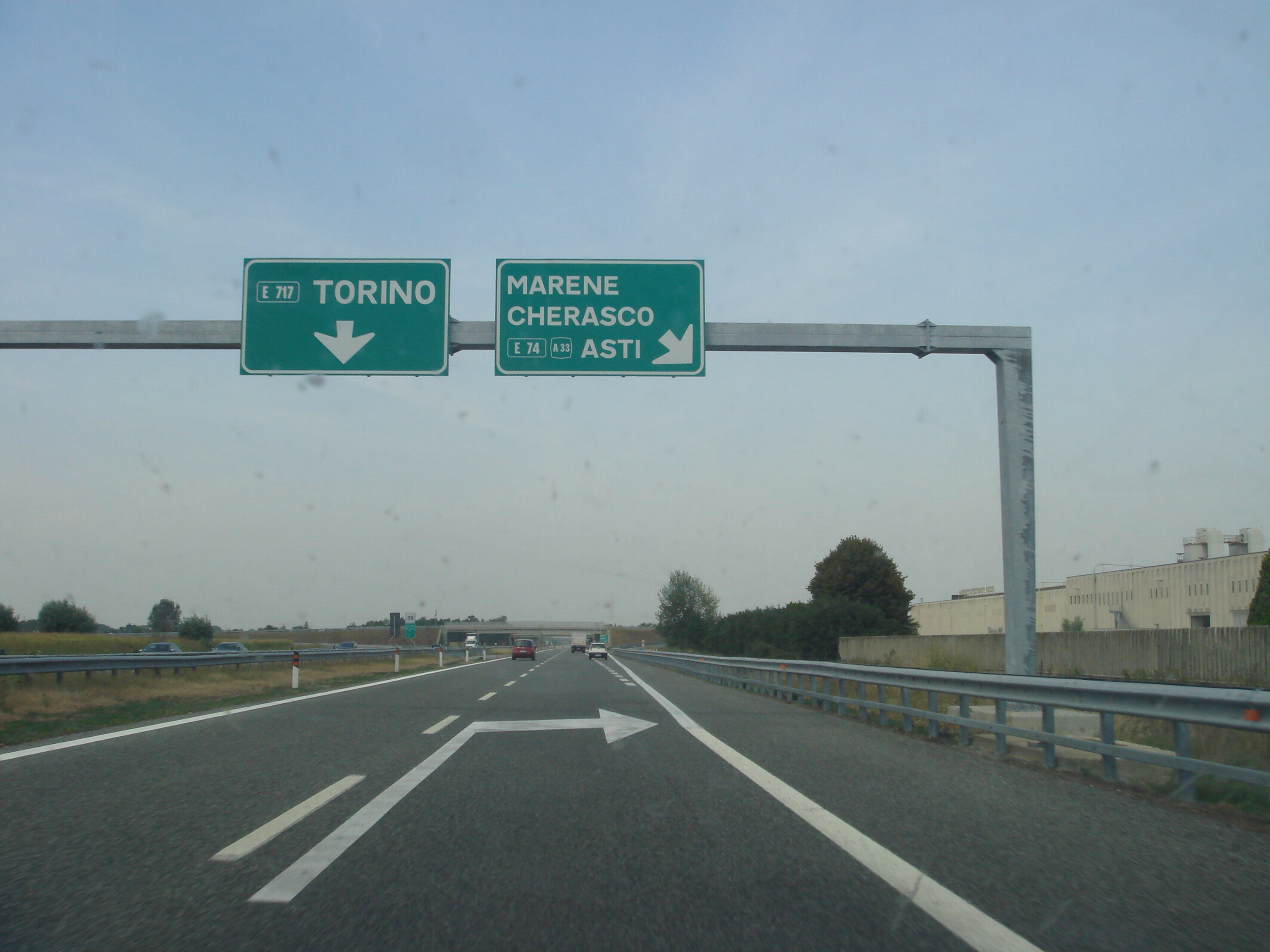
Autostrada A6 near Asti

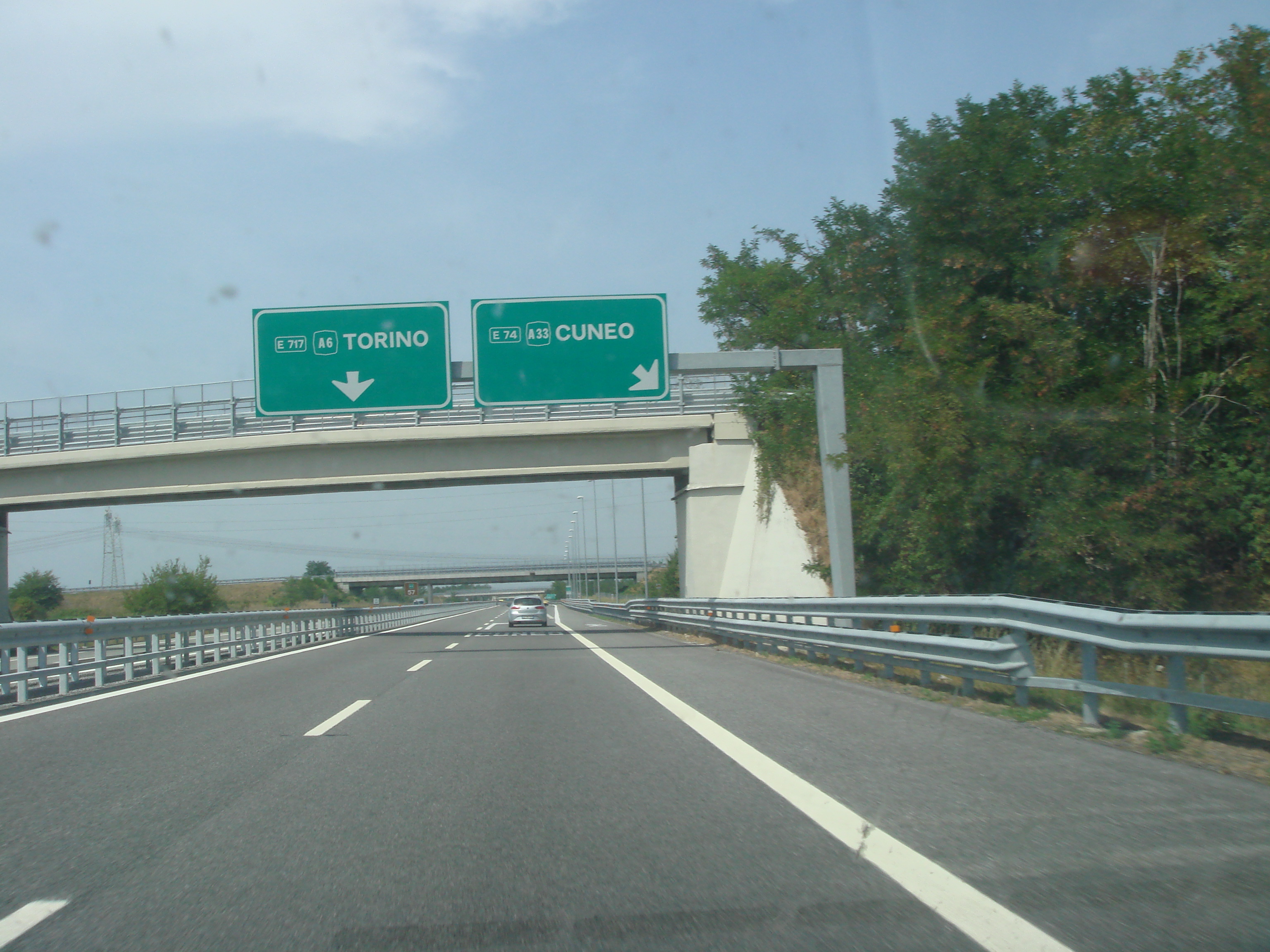
Autostrada A6 near Cuneo

TURIN – SAVONA; La Verdemare
Exit	↓km↓	↑km↑	Province	European route
Tangenziale Sud di Torino; Torino – C.so Unità d'Italia; Turin Caselle Airport	0.0 km (0 mi)	124.3 km (77.2 mi)	TO	E717
Rest area "Rio dei Cocchi"	10.8 km (6.7 mi)	113.5 km (70.5 mi)	TO	E717
Toll gate Turin	13.0 km (8.1 mi)	111.3 km (69.2 mi)	TO	E717
Carmagnola; Poirino	13.1 km (8.1 mi)	111.2 km (69.1 mi)	TO	E717
Rest area "Rio Coloré"	29.8 km (18.5 mi)	94.5 km (58.7 mi)	TO	E717
Marene; Asti; Cherasco	34.6 km (21.5 mi)	89.7 km (55.7 mi)	CN	E717
Rest area "Rio Ghidone"	47.8 km (29.7 mi)	76.5 km (47.5 mi)	CN	E717
Fossano; Raccordo di Fossano	49.3 km (30.6 mi)	75.0 km (46.6 mi)	CN	E717
Cuneo	54.0 km (33.6 mi)	70.3 km (43.7 mi)	CN	E717
Carrù; Dogliani	57.8 km (35.9 mi)	66.5 km (41.3 mi)	CN	E717
Rest area "Mondovì est" (Note: Only in the direction of Turin)	--	62.7 km (39.0 mi)	CN	E717
Mondovì	62.7 km (39.0 mi)	61.6 km (38.3 mi)	CN	E717
Rest area "Mondovì ovest" (Note: Only in the direction of Savona)	63.0 km (39.1 mi)	--	CN	E717
Niella Tanaro; Sanctuary of Vicoforte	70.6 km (43.9 mi)	53.7 km (33.4 mi)	CN	E717
Ceva del Colle di Nava – Imperia	81.0 km (50.3 mi)	43.3 km (26.9 mi)	CN	E717
Rest area "Priero"	84.3 km (52.4 mi)	40.0 km (24.9 mi)	CN	E717
Millesimo	97.1 km (60.3 mi)	27.2 km (16.9 mi)	SV	E717
Rest area "Cà Lidora Ovest"	103.3 km (64.2 mi)	--	SV	E717
Rest area "Carcare Est"	--	16.7 km (10.4 mi)	SV	E717
Altare – Carcare; Cairo Montenotte	109.6 km (68.1 mi)	14.7 km (9.1 mi)	SV	E717
Genova – Ventimiglia	124.3 km (77.2 mi)	0.0 km (0 mi)	SV	E717

=== Fossano connection ===
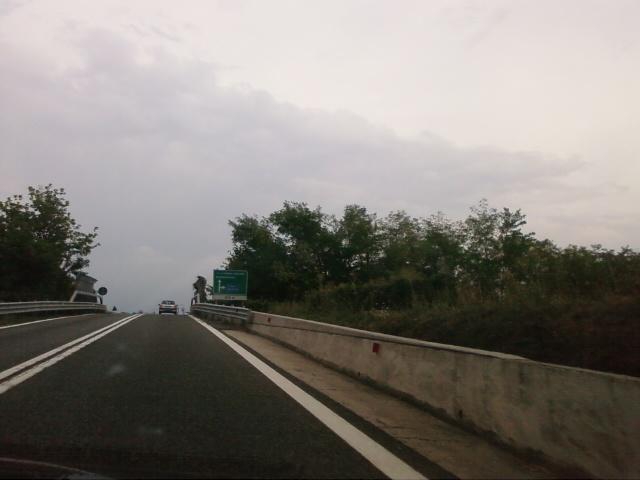
Fossano connection

RACCORDO FOSSANO - A6; Fossano connection
Exit	↓km↓	↑km↑	Province
Torino-Savona	0.0 km (0 mi)	6.6 km (4.1 mi)	CN
Toll gate "Fossano"	0.1 km (0.062 mi)	6.5 km (4.0 mi)	CN
Bene Vagienna	0.3 km (0.19 mi)	6.3 km (3.9 mi)	CN
Trinità	1.4 km (0.87 mi)	5.2 km (3.2 mi)	CN
Fossano del Colle di Nava	6.6 km (4.1 mi)	0.0 km (0 mi)	CN

== See also ==
- Autostrade of Italy
- Roads in Italy
- Transport in Italy

=== Other Italian roads ===
- State highways (Italy)
- Regional road (Italy)
- Provincial road (Italy)
- Municipal road (Italy)
