= Autoroute 10 =

Autoroute 10 may refer to:

- A10 autoroute (France)
- Quebec Autoroute 10, in Quebec, Canada

== See also ==
- list of A10 roads
- List of highways numbered 10
