= Autostrada A21 (Italy) =

Controlled-access highway in Italy

Autostrada A21
- Autostrada dei Vini; Wines motorway

Route information
- Part of E70
- Maintained by ANAS
- Length: 238.3 km (148.1 mi)
- Existed: 1968–present

Major junctions
- West end: Turin
- A55 in Turin; A26 in Alessandria; A7 in Alessandria; A1 in Piacenza; A4 in Brescia
- East end: Brescia

Location
- Country: Italy
- Regions: Piedmont, Emilia-Romagna, Lombardy

Highway system
- Roads in Italy; Autostrade; State; Regional; Provincial; Municipal
← A 20	→ A 22

The Autostrada A21 or Autostrada dei Vini ("Wines motorway") is an autostrada (Italian for "motorway") 238.3 kilometres (148.1 mi) long in Italy located in the regions of Piedmont, Emilia-Romagna and Lombardy which connects Turin to Brescia, through the Po Valley and the city of Piacenza. It was inaugurated in 1968. It is nicknamed the "Wines motorway" because it runs through many famous wine areas (Astigiano, Alessandrino, Oltrepò Pavese, Piacentino, reaching Brescia near Franciacorta). It is a part of the E70 European route.

== Route ==
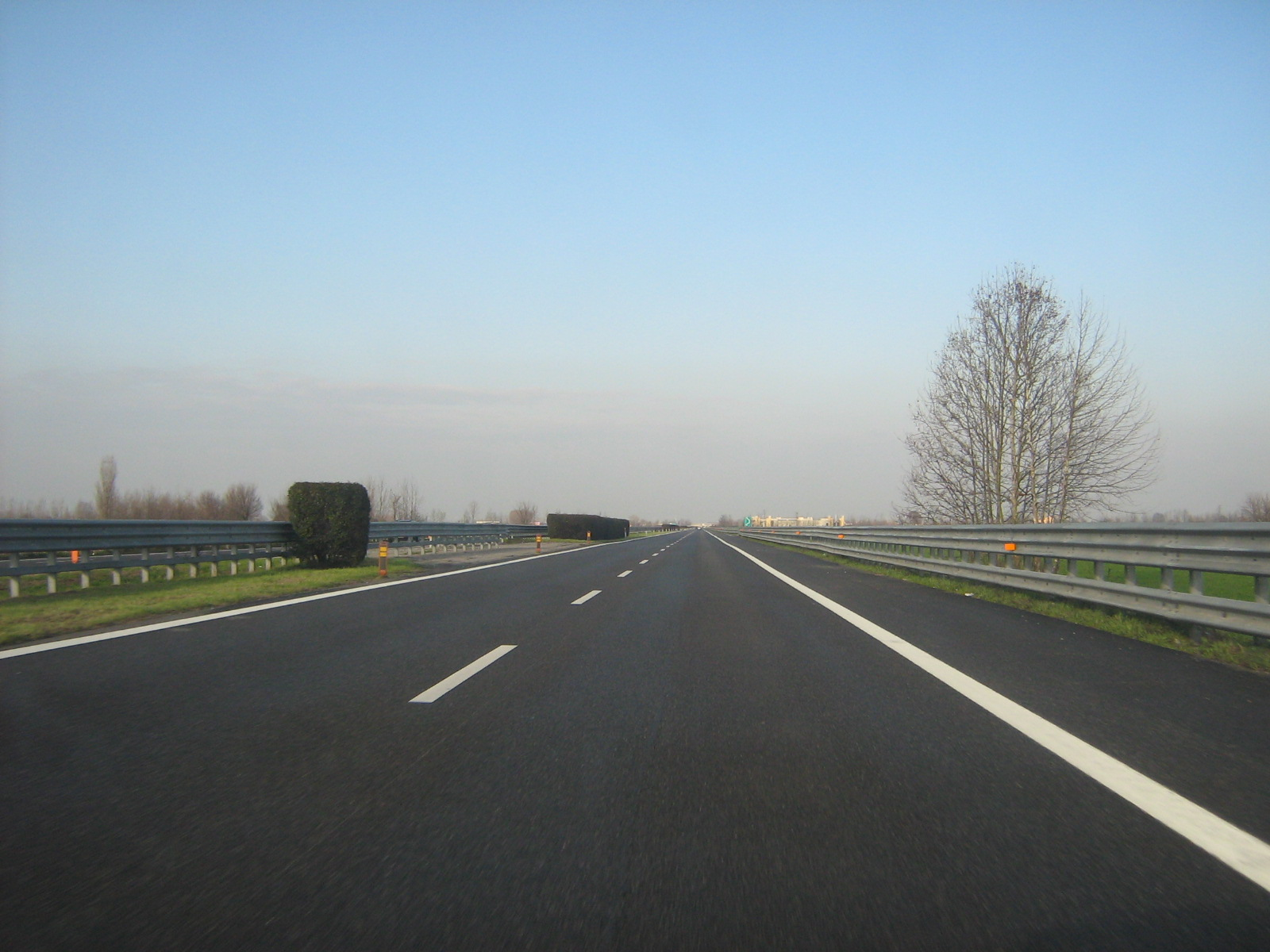
Autostrada A21 in the Piacenza-Brescia section.

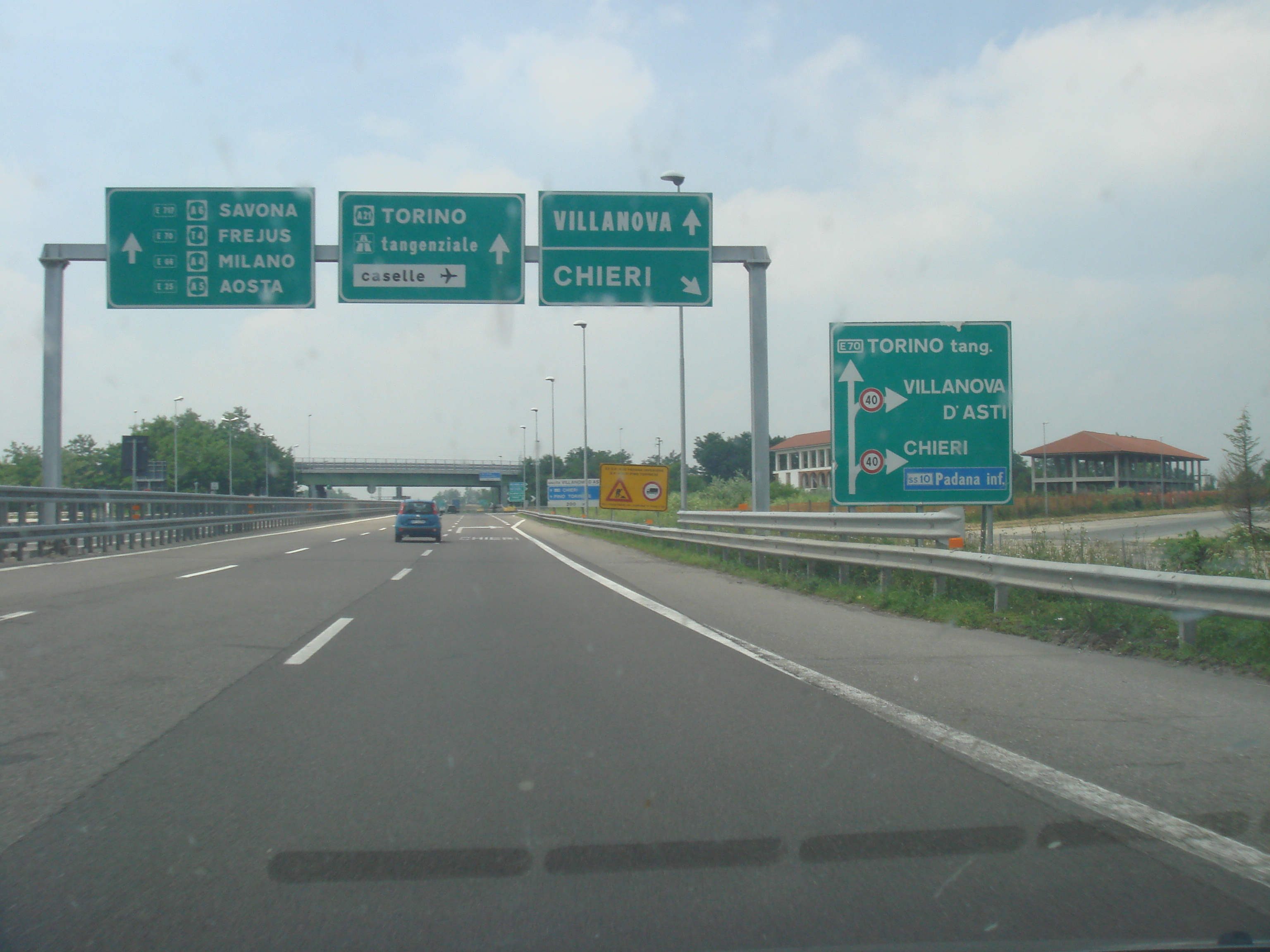
Autostrada A21 near Chieri

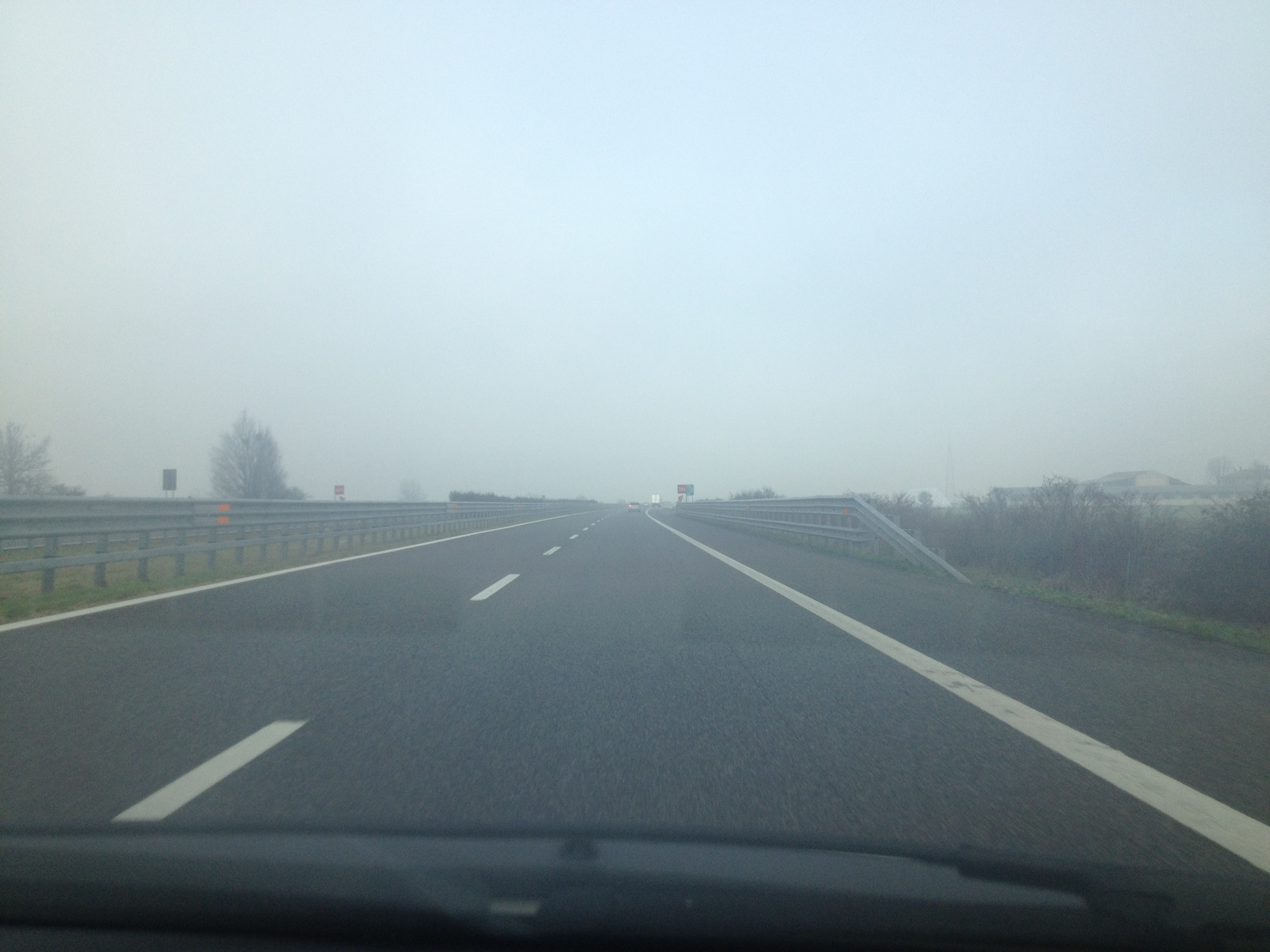
Autostrada A21 near Caorso

TORINO - PIACENZA - BRESCIA; Autostrada dei Vini
Exit	↓km↓	↑km↑	Province	European Route
Tangenziale Sud di Torino (Santena)	0.0 km (0 mi)	238.3 km (148.1 mi)	TO	E70
Villanova	11.0 km (6.8 mi)	227.3 km (141.2 mi)	AT	E70
Toll gate Villanova	11.0 km (6.8 mi)	227.3 km (141.2 mi)	AT	E70
Rest area "Villanova"	13.0 km (8.1 mi)	225.3 km (140.0 mi)	AT	E70
Asti ovest	32.0 km (19.9 mi)	206.3 km (128.2 mi)	AT	E70
Asti est Cuneo	39.0 km (24.2 mi)	199.3 km (123.8 mi)	AT	E70
} Rest area "Crocetta"	48.0 km (29.8 mi)	190.3 km (118.2 mi)	AL	E70
Felizzano - Quattordio	52.0 km (32.3 mi)	186.3 km (115.8 mi)	AL	E70
Genova - Gravellona Toce	65.0 km (40.4 mi)	173.3 km (107.7 mi)	AL	E70
Alessandria ovest	66.0 km (41.0 mi)	172.3 km (107.1 mi)	AL	E70
Alessandria est	76.0 km (47.2 mi)	162.3 km (100.8 mi)	AL	E70
Milano - Genova; Tortona	87.0 km (54.1 mi)	151.3 km (94.0 mi)	AL	E70
Rest area "Tortona"	91.5 km (56.9 mi)	146.8 km (91.2 mi)	AL	E70
Voghera	101.3 km (62.9 mi)	137.0 km (85.1 mi)	PV	E70
Casteggio - Casatisma	115.0 km (71.5 mi)	123.3 km (76.6 mi)	PV	E70
Broni - Stradella	127.0 km (78.9 mi)	111.3 km (69.2 mi)	PV	E70
Rest area "Stradella"	130.2 km (80.9 mi)	108.1 km (67.2 mi)	PV	E70
Castel San Giovanni	141.0 km (87.6 mi)	97.3 km (60.5 mi)	PC	E70
Rest area "Trebbia"	157.0 km (97.6 mi)	81.3 km (50.5 mi)	PC	E70
Piacenza ovest	157.0 km (97.6 mi)	81.3 km (50.5 mi)	PC	E70
Milano - Napoli; Piacenza sud	165.0 km (102.5 mi)	73.3 km (45.5 mi)	PC	E70
Rest area "Nure"	166.0 km (103.1 mi)	72.3 km (44.9 mi)	PC	E70
Caorso	176.0 km (109.4 mi)	62.3 km (38.7 mi)	PC	E70
Diramazione Fiorenzuola d'Arda; Parma - Bologna (Note: Exit only towards Piacenza, entry only towards Brescia)	181.0 km (112.5 mi)	57.3 km (35.6 mi)	PC	E70
Castelvetro Piacentino	186.0 km (115.6 mi)	52.3 km (32.5 mi)	PC	E70
Rest area "Cremona"	193.0 km (119.9 mi)	45.3 km (28.1 mi)	CR	E70
Cremona	194.8 km (121.0 mi)	43.5 km (27.0 mi)	CR	E70
Pontevico	210.0 km (130.5 mi)	28.3 km (17.6 mi)	BS	E70
Manerbio	220.3 km (136.9 mi)	18.0 km (11.2 mi)	BS	E70
Rest area "Ghedi"	230.4 km (143.2 mi)	7.9 km (4.9 mi)	BS	E70
Brescia sud Raccordo autostradale Ospitaletto-Montichiari; Brescia Montichiari Airport	233.2 km (144.9 mi)	5.1 km (3.2 mi)	BS	E70
Torino - Trieste	237.0 km (147.3 mi)	1.3 km (0.81 mi)	BS	E70
Toll gate Brescia centro	238.3 km (148.1 mi)	0.0 km (0 mi)	BS	
Brescia	238.3 km (148.1 mi)	0.0 km (0 mi)	BS	

=== Fiorenzuola d'Arda connection ===
DIRAMAZIONE FIORENZUOLA D'ARDA; Fiorenzuola d'Arda connection
Exit	↓km↓	↑km↑	Province
Torino - Piacenza - Brescia	0.0 km (0 mi)	12.3 km (7.6 mi)	PC
Fiorenzuola d'Arda	12.3 km (7.6 mi)	0.0 km (0 mi)	PC

== See also ==
- Autostrade of Italy
- Roads in Italy
- Transport in Italy

=== Other Italian roads ===
- State highways (Italy)
- Regional road (Italy)
- Provincial road (Italy)
- Municipal road (Italy)
