= ICOP =

ICOP may refer to:

- The International Conference on Permafrost
- The United States Postal Service's Internet Covert Operations Program
- I.CO.P., an Italian company.
