= Fréjus Tunnel =

The Fréjus Tunnel may refer to one of two tunnels connecting Modane, France with Bardonecchia, Italy:

- the Fréjus Rail Tunnel, also known as the Mont Cenis Tunnel, completed in 1871.
- the Fréjus Road Tunnel, completed in 1980.
