= A55 road (disambiguation) =

The A55 road is in north Wales.

Other A55 roads include:

- A55 highway (Australia)
- A55 motorway (Canada)
- A55 motorway (France)
- Autostrada A55 (Italy)
- A55 road (Northern Ireland)
