= Autostrada A55 =

Controlled-access highway in Italy

Autostrada A55
- Tangenziale di Torino; Turin ring road

Route information
- Part of E70
- Maintained by ANAS
- Existed: 1976–present

Major junctions
- Beltway around Turin

Section 1
- Length: 20.2 km (12.6 mi)
- West end: Rivoli
- Major intersections: A32 in Rivoli; RA10 in Caselle; A32 in Settimo Torinese
- East end: Settimo Torinese

Section 2
- Length: 25.9 km (16.1 mi)
- South end: Santena
- Major intersections: A21 in Santena
- North end: Rivoli

Location
- Country: Italy
- Regions: Piedmont

Highway system
- Roads in Italy; Autostrade; State; Regional; Provincial; Municipal
| ← A 54 | → A 56 |

Map of Turin's ring road

Autostrada A55 or Tangenziale di Torino ("Turin ring road") is an autostrada (Italian for "motorway") 56.1 kilometres (34.9 mi) long in Italy located in the region of Piedmont that runs in the suburbs of Turin. In its main route, which surrounds the subalpine city for three quarters, it is composed of three lanes by direction of travel with an emergency lane and is divided figuratively into two sections: the North ring road and the South ring road, both managed by the ATIVA. It is a part of the E70 European route.

== Route ==
=== North ring road ===
TANGENZIALE NORD DI TORINO; Autostrada A55
| Exit | ↓km↓ | ↑km↑ | Province | European Route |
| Bardonecchia | 0.0 km (0 mi) | 20.2 km (12.6 mi) | TO | E70 |
| del Moncenisio; Rivoli | 0.3 km (0.19 mi) | 19.9 km (12.4 mi) | TO | E70 |
| Rest area "Rivoli Sud" (Note: Eastern carriageway only) | 0.8 km (0.50 mi) | 19.4 km (12.1 mi) | TO | E70 |
| Rest area "Rivoli Nord" (Note: West carriageway only) | 1.8 km (1.1 mi) | 18.4 km (11.4 mi) | TO | E70 |
| Toll gate Bruere | 2.9 km (1.8 mi) | 17.3 km (10.7 mi) | TO | E70 |
| Tangenziale Sud | 3.7 km (2.3 mi) | 16.5 km (10.3 mi) | TO | E70 |
| del Monginevro; Pianezza, Collegno | 6.6 km (4.1 mi) | 13.6 km (8.5 mi) | TO | -- |
| Pianezza del Monginevro | 6.9 km (4.3 mi) | 13.3 km (8.3 mi) | TO | -- |
| Savonera; Palace of Venaria; Druento | 7.6 km (4.7 mi) | 12.6 km (7.8 mi) | TO | -- |
| Corso Regina Margherita | 8.5 km (5.3 mi) | 11.7 km (7.3 mi) | TO | -- |
| Savonera; Palace of Venaria; Druento | 8.9 km (5.5 mi) | 11.3 km (7.0 mi) | TO | -- |
| Venaria - Stadio; Druento; Lanzo Valleys; Juventus Stadium | 12.2 km (7.6 mi) | 8.0 km (5.0 mi) | TO | -- |
| Borgaro; Palace of Venaria; Lanzo Valleys | 14.1 km (8.8 mi) | 6.1 km (3.8 mi) | TO | -- |
| Rest area "Stura Nord" | 15.5 km (9.6 mi) | 4.7 km (2.9 mi) | TO | -- |
| Rest area "Stura Sud" | 16.4 km (10.2 mi) | 3.8 km (2.4 mi) | TO | -- |
| Caselle - Torino - Caselle; Turin Caselle Airport; Lanzo Valleys del Gran Paradiso - Canavese | 17.1 km (10.6 mi) | 3.1 km (1.9 mi) | TO | -- |
| Raccordo della Falchera; Turin-Milan; Padana Superiore | 18.2 km (11.3 mi) | 2.0 km (1.2 mi) | TO | -- |
| Settimo Torinese | 20.1 km (12.5 mi) | 0.1 km (0.062 mi) | TO | -- |
| Toll gate Torino Nord | 20.1 km (12.5 mi) | 0.1 km (0.062 mi) | TO | -- |
| Aosta | 20.2 km (12.6 mi) | 0.0 km (0 mi) | TO | -- |

=== South ring road ===
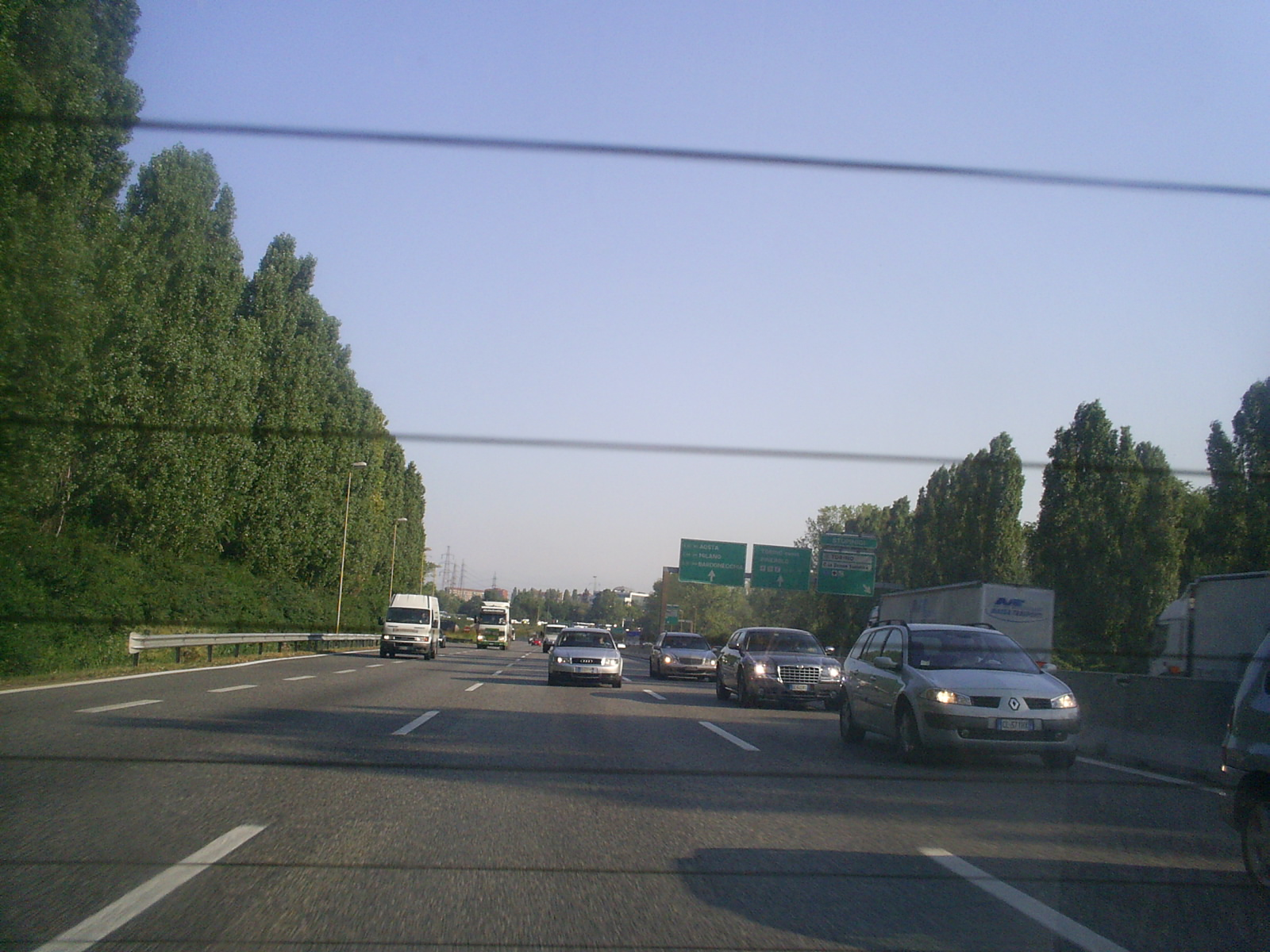
Turin's South ring road

TANGENZIALE SUD DI TORINO; Autostrada A55
| Exit | ↓km↓ | ↑km↑ | Province | European Route |
| Piacenza-Brescia | 0.0 km (0 mi) | 25.9 km (16.1 mi) | TO | E70 |
| Santena | 0.1 km (0.062 mi) | 25.8 km (16.0 mi) | TO | E70 |
| Toll gate Trofarello | 4.0 km (2.5 mi) | 21.9 km (13.6 mi) | TO | E70 |
| Vadò | 4.7 km (2.9 mi) | 21.2 km (13.2 mi) | TO | E70 |
| Bauducchi; Diramazione per Moncalieri - C.so Unità d'Italia; Lingotto; Moncalieri; Savona | 6.8 km (4.2 mi) | 19.1 km (11.9 mi) | TO | E70 |
| del Colle di Tenda e della Valle Roja; La Loggia | 9.6 km (6.0 mi) | 16.3 km (10.1 mi) | TO | E70 |
| Rest area "Nichelino Nord" (Note: Northern carriageway only) | 10.1 km (6.3 mi) | 15.8 km (9.8 mi) | TO | E70 |
| Rest area "Nichelino Sud" (Note: Southern carriageway only) | 11.6 km (7.2 mi) | 14.3 km (8.9 mi) | TO | E70 |
| Debouché; Nichelino, Vinovo; Turin racecourses | 13.7 km (8.5 mi) | 12.6 km (7.8 mi) | TO | E70 |
| Stupinigi del Colle di Sestriere; Palazzina di caccia of Stupinigi; Corso Unione Sovietica; Stadio Olimpico Grande Torino | 15.2 km (9.4 mi) | 10.7 km (6.6 mi) | TO | E70 |
| Drosso; C.so Orbassano; FIAT Drosso plant Beinasco-Orbassano | 17.3 km (10.7 mi) | 8.6 km (5.3 mi) | TO | E70 |
| Autostrada del Pinerolese dei Laghi di Avigliana | 18.0 km (11.2 mi) | 7.9 km (4.9 mi) | TO | E70 |
| S.I.TO Interporto; San Luigi Gonzaga Hospital "Autostrada Ferroviaria Alpina" | 21.0 km (13.0 mi) | 4.9 km (3.0 mi) | TO | E70 |
| C.so Allamano; Grugliasco; C.so IV Novembre | 24.7 km (15.3 mi) | 1.2 km (0.75 mi) | TO | E70 |
| C.so Francia; Rivoli, Cascine Vica | 25.4 km (15.8 mi) | 0.5 km (0.31 mi) | TO | E70 |
| Tangenziale Nord | 25.9 km (16.1 mi) | 0.0 km (0 mi) | TO | E70 |

=== Turin-Chivasso connection ===
RACCORDO DELLA FALCHERA; Turin-Chivasso connection
| Exit | ↓km↓ | ↑km↑ | Province | European Route |
| Tangenziale Nord | 0.0 km (0 mi) | 3.2 km (2.0 mi) | TO | -- |
| Toll gate Falchera | 0.5 km (0.31 mi) | 2.7 km (1.7 mi) | TO | -- |
| Leini del Gran Paradiso | 0.5 km (0.31 mi) | 2.7 km (1.7 mi) | TO | -- |
| Turin - Trieste | 1.9 km (1.2 mi) | 2.3 km (1.4 mi) | TO | -- |
| Abbadia di Stura | 3.1 km (1.9 mi) | 0.1 km (0.062 mi) | TO | -- |
| Padana Superiore | 3.2 km (2.0 mi) | 0.0 km (0 mi) | TO | -- |

=== Moncalieri connection ===
Map of the Moncalieri connection

DIRAMAZIONE PER MONCALIERI; Moncalieri connection
| Exit | ↓km↓ | ↑km↑ | Province | European Route |
| Turin - C.so Unità d'Italia; Italia '61 | 0.0 km (0 mi) | 5.0 km (3.1 mi) | TO | -- |
| San Paolo di Villastellone | 3.3 km (2.1 mi) | 1.7 km (1.1 mi) | TO | -- |
| Rest area "Bauducchi" | 4.3 km (2.7 mi) | 1.9 km (1.2 mi) | TO | -- |
| Tangenziale Sud | 5.1 km (3.2 mi) | 1.1 km (0.68 mi) | TO | -- |
| Savona | 6.2 km (3.9 mi) | 0.0 km (0 mi) | TO | -- |

=== Pinerolo connection ===
Map of the Pinerolo connection

TORINO - PINEROLO; Autostrada del Pinerolese; Pinerolo connection
| Exit | ↓km↓ | ↑km↑ | Province | European Route |
| Turin - C.so Orbassano | 0.0 km (0 mi) | 23.4 km (14.5 mi) | TO | -- |
| Tangenziale Nord; Milano; Bardonecchia; Aosta; Traforo del Monte Bianco; Traforo del Gran San Bernardo; Traforo del Frejus | 0.9 km (0.56 mi) | 22.5 km (14.0 mi) | TO | -- |
| ] Stabilimento Drosso (Note: Use reserved only for FIAT plant employees); Tangenziale Sud; Savona; Piacenza - Brescia | 1.3 km (0.81 mi) | 22.1 km (13.7 mi) | TO | -- |
| Autostrada del pinerolese | 1.3 km (0.81 mi) | 22.1 km (13.7 mi) | TO | -- |
| Toll gate Beinasco | 2.3 km (1.4 mi) | 21.1 km (13.1 mi) | TO | -- |
| Rest area "Beinasco" | 3.0 km (1.9 mi) | 20.4 km (12.7 mi) | TO | -- |
| Orbassano (Note: Only entry towards Turin, only exit towards Pinerolo.) | 4.2 km (2.6 mi) | 19.2 km (11.9 mi) | TO | -- |
| Candiolo; Rivalta; Orbassano; I.R.C.C. - Centro Tumori | 7.1 km (4.4 mi) | 16.3 km (10.1 mi) | TO | -- |
| Gerbole di Volvera | 9.6 km (6.0 mi) | 13.8 km (8.6 mi) | TO | -- |
| Volvera | 12.1 km (7.5 mi) | 11.3 km (7.0 mi) | TO | -- |
| None | 13.9 km (8.6 mi) | 9.5 km (5.9 mi) | TO | -- |
| Piscina | 19.8 km (12.3 mi) | 3.6 km (2.2 mi) | TO | -- |
| Rest area "Piscina" | 21.5 km (13.4 mi) | 1.9 km (1.2 mi) | TO | -- |
| Riva di Pinerolo | 23.1 km (14.4 mi) | 0.3 km (0.19 mi) | TO | -- |
| Tangenziale di Pinerolo; Val Chisone - Sestriere; Saluzzo - Cuneo; Val Pellice | 23.4 km (14.5 mi) | 0.0 km (0 mi) | TO | -- |

== See also ==
- Autostrade of Italy
- Roads in Italy
- Transport in Italy

=== Other Italian roads ===
- State highways (Italy)
- Regional road (Italy)
- Provincial road (Italy)
- Municipal road (Italy)
