= List of A10 roads =

This is a list of roads designated A10. Roads entries are sorted in the countries alphabetical order.

- A010 road (Argentina), a road in the northeast of Chubut Province
- A10 road (Australia) may refer to:
  - A10 highway (South Australia) may refer to:
    - Adelaide-Mannum Road
  - A10 highway (Tasmania) may refer to:
    - Lyell Highway, a road that connects the south of the state with the West Coast
    - Murchison Highway, a road that connects the north of the state with the west coast
    - Zeehan Highway, a road that connects the above two roads on the west coast
- A10 motorway (Austria), a road connecting Salzburg and Villach
- A10 road (Belgium), a road connecting Brussels and Ostend
- A10 Road (Botswana), a road connecting Gaborone and Kanye
- A10 road (Canada) may refer to:
  - A10 expressway (Quebec), a road connecting the Ville-Marie Expressway and the Champlain Bridge in Montreal
- A10 highway (Croatia), a road connecting Metković and Ploče
- A10 motorway (France), a road connecting Paris and Bordeaux
- A10 motorway (Germany), a ring-road surrounding Berlin
- A10 motorway (Italy), a road connecting Genoa and Ventimiglia
- A10 road (Latvia), a road connecting Riga and Ventspils
- A10 highway (Lithuania), a road connecting Panevėžys, Pasvalys and Bauska
- A10 road (Malaysia), a road in Perak connecting Kampung Changkat Petai and Tapah
- A10 motorway (Netherlands), a road around Amsterdam
- A10 motorway (Romania), a road connecting Sebeș to Turda (near Cluj-Napoca)
- A-10 motorway (Spain), a road in Navarre connecting the A-15 and the A-1
- A 10 road (Sri Lanka), a road connecting Katugastota, Kurunegala and Puttalam
- A10 motorway (Switzerland), a road connecting Muri bei Bern and Rüfenacht
- A10 road (United Kingdom) refers to :
  - A10 road (England), a major north–south road
- A10 road (Isle of Man), a road connecting Ballaugh and Ramsey
- A10 road (United States of America) may refer to:
  - A10 road (California), a road in Siskiyou County connecting Mount Shasta City to a dead end at the foot of Mount Shasta
- A10 road (Zimbabwe), a road connecting Durban in South Africa and Mount Darwin via Harare

== See also ==
- List of highways numbered 10
