= Autostrada A32 (Italy) =

Controlled-access highway in Italy

Autostrada A32
- Autostrada del Frejus; Frejus motorway

Route information
- Part of E70
- Maintained by ANAS
- Length: 73 km (45 mi)
- Existed: 1987–present

Major junctions
- East end: Turin
- A55 in Turin
- West end: Fréjus Road Tunnel

Location
- Country: Italy
- Regions: Piedmont

Highway system
- Roads in Italy; Autostrade; State; Regional; Provincial; Municipal
| ← A 31 | → A 33 |

The Autostrada A32 or Autostrada del Frejus ("Frejus motorway") is an autostrada (Italian for "motorway") 73 kilometres (45 mi) long in Italy located in the region of Piedmont which connects the city of Turin to the A43 autoroute in France through the Fréjus Road Tunnel, located in the municipality of Bardonecchia. It is a part of the E70 European route. A section of the motorway was used as part of the route of the 19th stage of the 2018 Giro d'Italia.

== Route ==
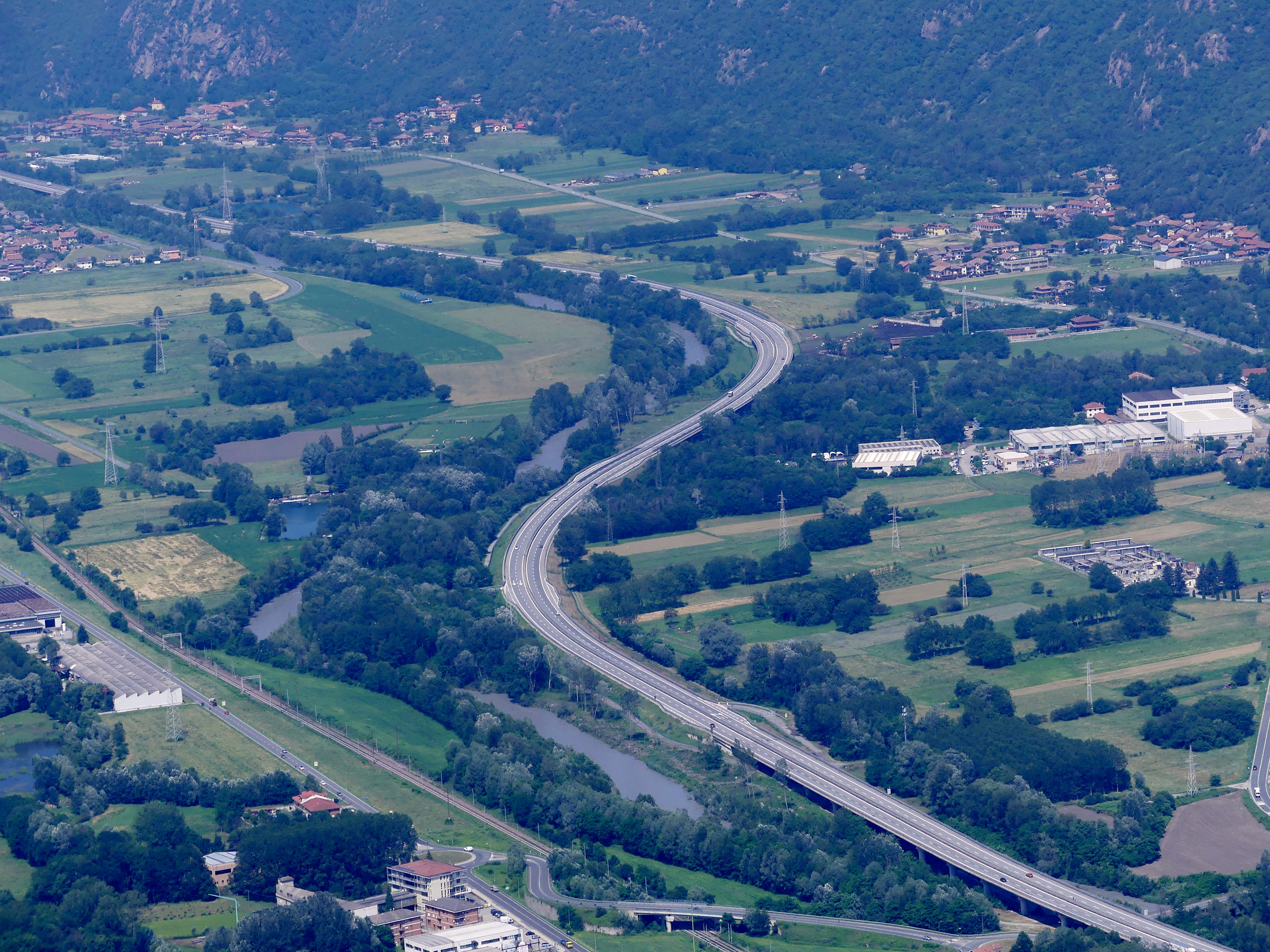
Autostrada A32 near the Sacra di San Michele in Sant'Ambrogio di Torino

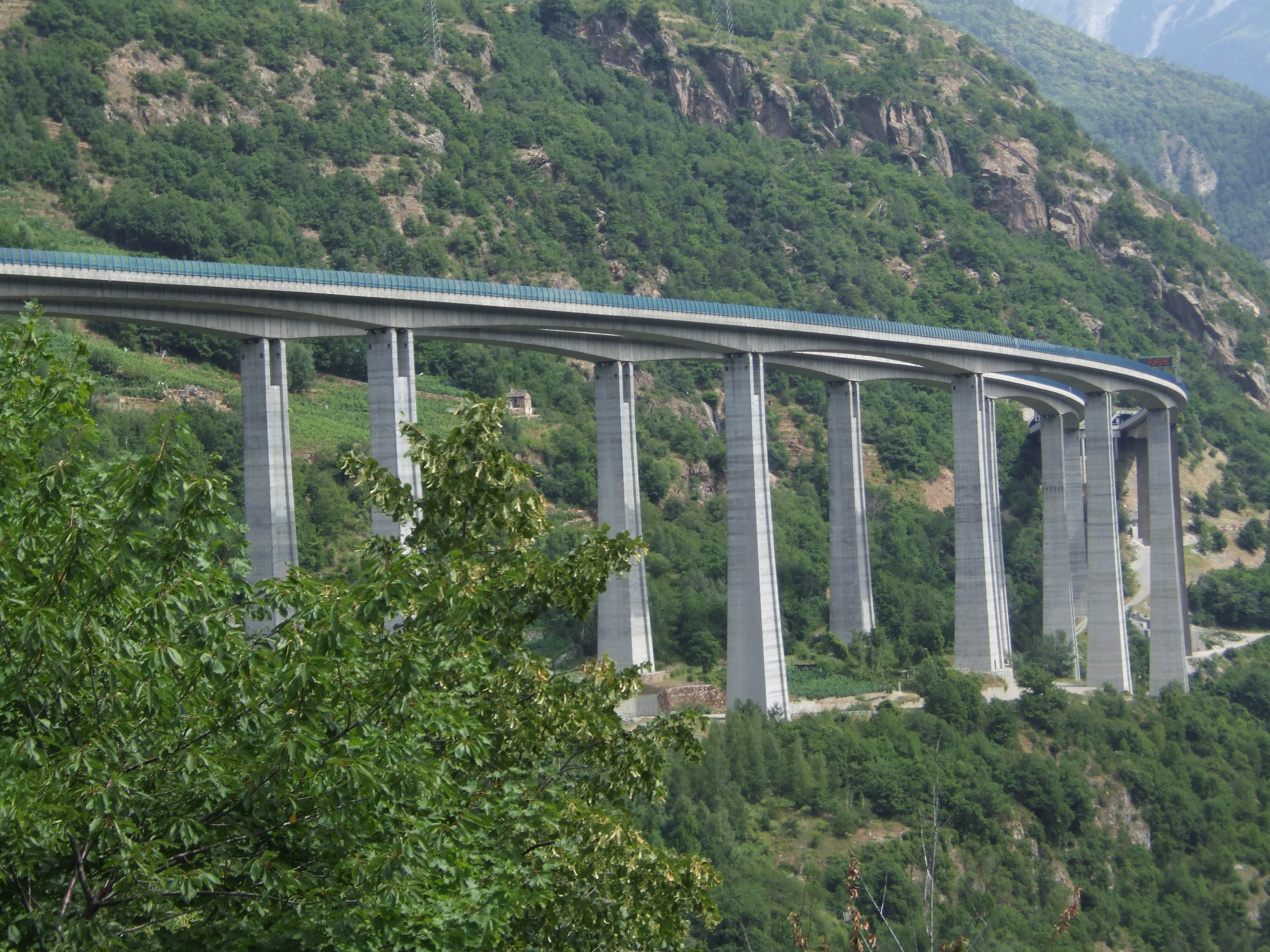
Autostrada A32 near Chiomonte

TORINO - FREJUS; Autostrada del Frejus
| Exit | ↓km↓ | ↑km↑ | Province | European Route |
| Tangenziale Nord di Torino | 0.0 km (0 mi) | 73.0 km (45.4 mi) | TO | E70 |
| Rivoli - Rosta (Note: Towards Turin: exit only); Industrial area | 0.3 km (0.19 mi) | 72.7 km (45.2 mi) | TO | E70 |
| Avigliana Est (Note: Frejus direction: neither entry nor exit) | 6.9 km (4.3 mi) | 66.1 km (41.1 mi) | TO | E70 |
| Avigliana Centro | 7.2 km (4.5 mi) | 65.8 km (40.9 mi) | TO | E70 |
| Avigliana Ovest - Almese | 8.6 km (5.3 mi) | 64.4 km (40.0 mi) | TO | E70 |
| Toll gate Avigliana | 9.0 km (5.6 mi) | 64.0 km (39.8 mi) | TO | E70 |
| Borgone (Note: Turin direction: entry only; Frejus direction: exit only) | 24.0 km (14.9 mi) | 43.0 km (26.7 mi) | TO | E70 |
| Chianocco | 28.0 km (17.4 mi) | 45.0 km (28.0 mi) | TO | E70 |
| Susa Est | 35.0 km (21.7 mi) | 38.0 km (23.6 mi) | TO | E70 |
| Susa Est | 36.0 km (22.4 mi) | 37.0 km (23.0 mi) | TO | E70 |
| Susa Ovest del Moncenisio - Venaus | 40.0 km (24.9 mi) | 33.0 km (20.5 mi) | TO | E70 |
| Rest area "Gran Bosco Salbertrand" | 54.0 km (33.6 mi) | 19.0 km (11.8 mi) | TO | E70 |
| Toll gate Salbertrand | 57.0 km (35.4 mi) | 16.0 km (9.9 mi) | TO | E70 |
| Oulx Est< | 59.0 km (36.7 mi) | 14.0 km (8.7 mi) | TO | E70 |
| Oulx Ovest | 61.5 km (38.2 mi) | 11.5 km (7.1 mi) | TO | E70 |
| Oulx Circonvallazione del Monginevro | 61.8 km (38.4 mi) | 11.2 km (7.0 mi) | TO | E70 |
| Savoulx (Note: Frejus direction: entry only) di Bardonecchia | 65.0 km (40.4 mi) | 8.0 km (5.0 mi) | TO | E70 |
| Bardonecchia di Bardonecchia | 72.0 km (44.7 mi) | 1.0 km (0.62 mi) | TO | E70 |
| Rest area "Frejus" | 73.0 km (45.4 mi) | 0.0 km (0 mi) | TO | E70 |
| Traforo stradale del Frejus | - | - | - | E70 |
| France–Italy border A43 autoroute | - | - | - | E70 |

== See also ==
- Autostrade of Italy
- Roads in Italy
- Transport in Italy

=== Other Italian roads ===
- State highways (Italy)
- Regional road (Italy)
- Provincial road (Italy)
- Municipal road (Italy)
