= Autostrada A34 (Italy) =

Controlled-access highway in Italy

Autostrada A34

Route information
- Maintained by Autovie Venete
- Length: 17 km (11 mi)
- Existed: 2013–present

Major junctions
- West end: Villesse
- A4 in Villesse
- East end: Gorizia

Location
- Country: Italy
- Regions: Friuli-Venezia Giulia

Highway system
- Roads in Italy; Autostrade; State; Regional; Provincial; Municipal
← A 33	→ A 35

The Autostrada A34 is an autostrada (Italian for "motorway") 17 kilometres (11 mi) long in Italy located in the region of Friuli-Venezia Giulia that branches off of the Autostrada A4 at the Villesse junction going towards Gorizia. The motorway ends in Vertoiba/Vrtojba, where it continues as the A1 motorway in Slovenia. The highway is managed by Autovie Venete.

Previously, before the redevelopment, the highway was classified as a junction (Raccordo autostradale RA17), but was granted the new classification as Autostrada A34 by the Ministry of Transport. The entire highway requires the use of winter equipment from 15 November to 15 April.

== History ==
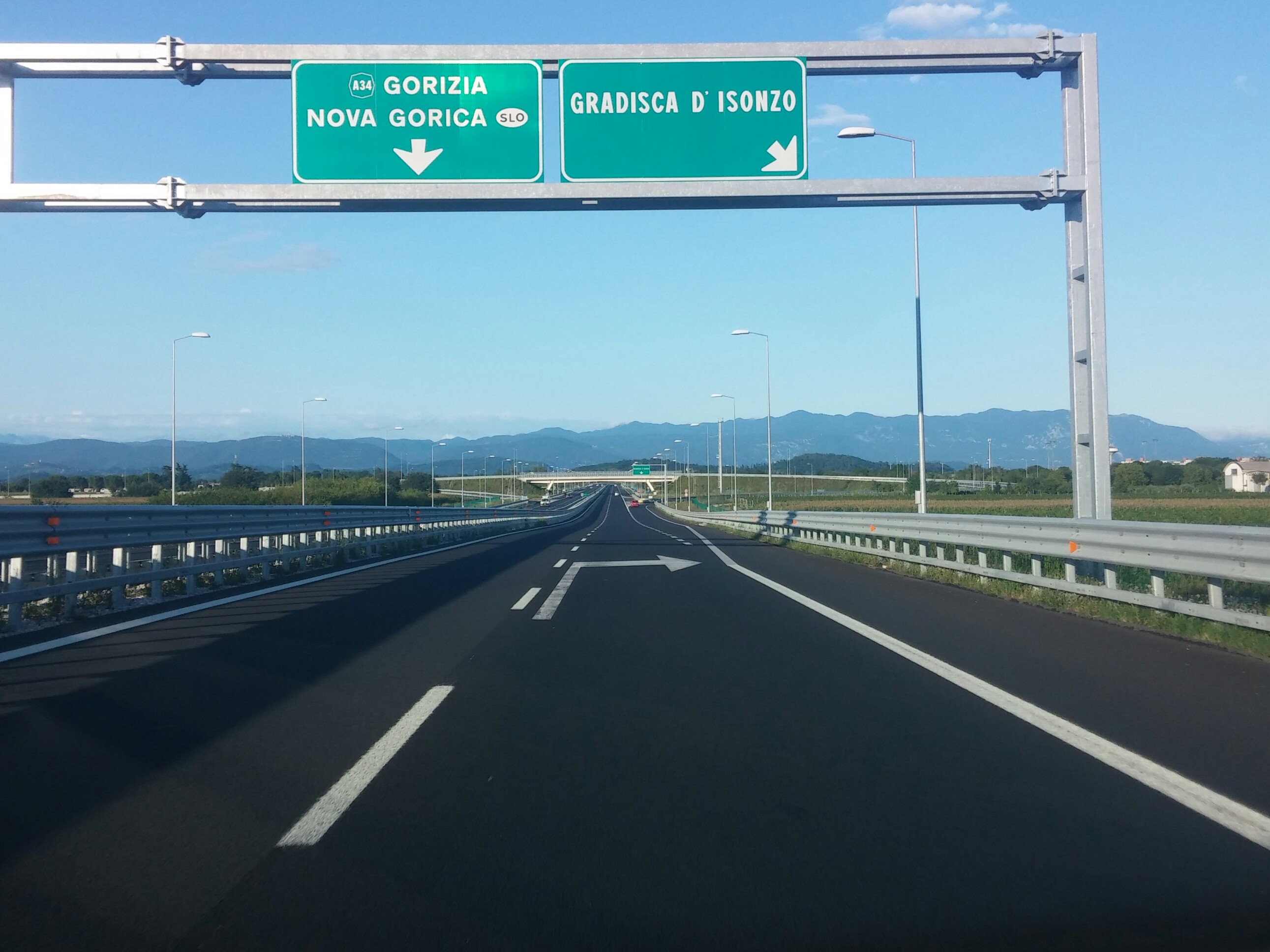
The exit for Gradisca d'Isonzo towards Gorizia after the redevelopment.

The original junction was opened in the late 1970s. Since the end of 2005, the road has been managed by Autovie Venete.

=== Redevelopment ===
The original RA 17 junction was classified as a secondary extra-urban road, defined by Italian regulations as being a single highway road with at least one lane in each direction. The road was later upgraded to meet highway regulations, starting on 12 December 2009. The redevelopment was estimated to cost €172,000,000 (Note: This would calculate to approximately €196,024,551.51 in 2019 after inflation.) and was done by a temporary association of companies: I.CO.P. SpA of Paolo Petrucco, Friulana Bitumi, SIOSS, Valle Costruzioni, and Tomat. To bring up to highway regulations, the junction had to be widened from 14 meters (45.93 ft.) to 25 meters (82.02 ft.), adding two more lanes of travel plus an emergency lane. Two artificial tunnels were built, along with a railway underpass, bridges, and viaducts. With Order 97/13, Autovie Venete opened the junction as a highway on 15 October 2013.

== Features ==
=== Original road ===
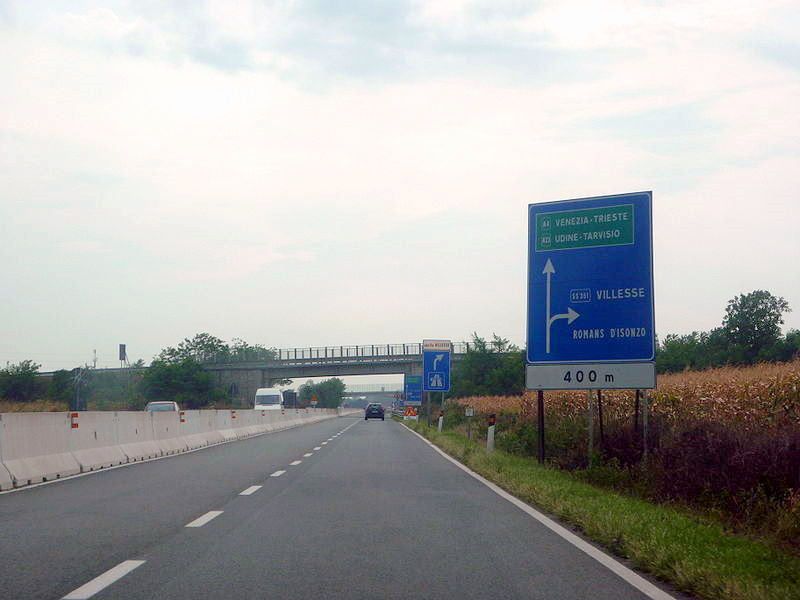
The junction towards the Autostrada A4 before the redevelopment

Since the road was not originally classified as a highway and instead as a secondary extra-urban road, the road was toll free. It had four lanes, two in each direction without an emergency lane.

The two sides were first separated simply by a double solid line, but in 2007 a Jersey barrier made of concrete was added in its place.

The RA 17 junction did not appear on any road signs. In fact, on signs located on overpasses, the junction was referred to as "a Villesse-Gorizia connection".

=== From 2013 ===
The work on the road was done to bring it up to regulations defined by Ministerial Decree 6792 of 2001 for Type A roads, which were motorways outside of the city. This allowed to increase the maximum speed on the road to 130 km/h (approximately 80 mph) from the original 80 km/h (approximately 50 mph).

== Route ==
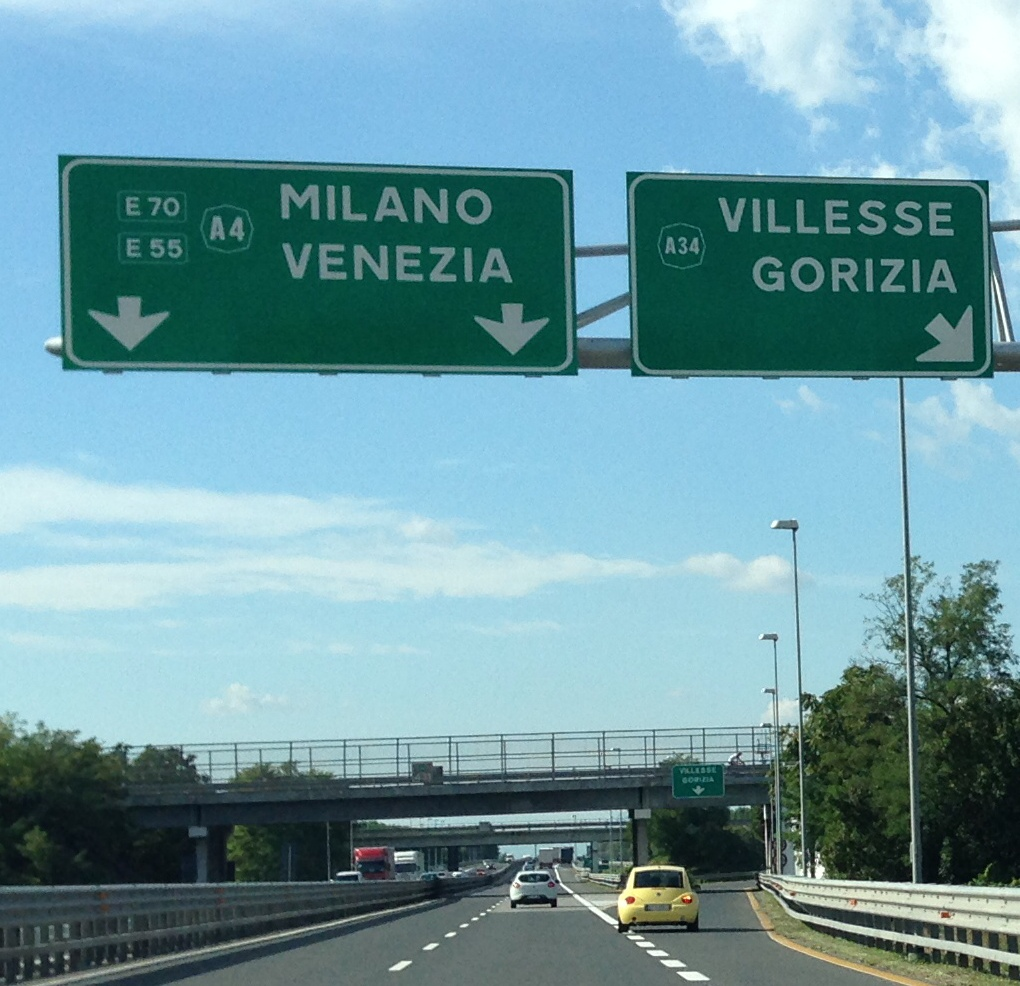
Autostrada A34 near Villesse

VILLESSE - GORIZIA
Exit	↓km↓	↑km↑	Province	European Route
Turin – Trieste	0.0 km (0 mi)	17.0 km (10.6 mi)	GO	--
Toll gate Villesse – Gorizia	0.6 km (0.37 mi)	16.4 km (10.2 mi)	GO	--
Villesse	1.7 km (1.1 mi)	15.3 km (9.5 mi)	GO	--
Gradisca d'Isonzo	6.2 km (3.9 mi)	10.8 km (6.7 mi)	GO	--
Farra d'Isonzo (Note: Only entrance towards Villesse.)	11.1 km (6.9 mi)	7.9 km (4.9 mi)	GO	--
Gorizia	16.9 km (10.5 mi)	0.1 km (0.062 mi)	GO	--
Italy–Slovenia border A1 motorway	17.0 km (10.6 mi)	0.0 km (0 mi)	GO	--

== See also ==
- Autostrade of Italy
- Roads in Italy
- Transport in Italy

=== Other Italian roads ===
- State highways (Italy)
- Regional road (Italy)
- Provincial road (Italy)
- Municipal road (Italy)
