= European route E717 =

Road in trans-European E-road network

E717

Route information
- Length: 141 km (88 mi)

Major junctions
- From: Turin
- To: Savona

Location
- Countries: Italy

Highway system
- International E-road network; A Class; B Class

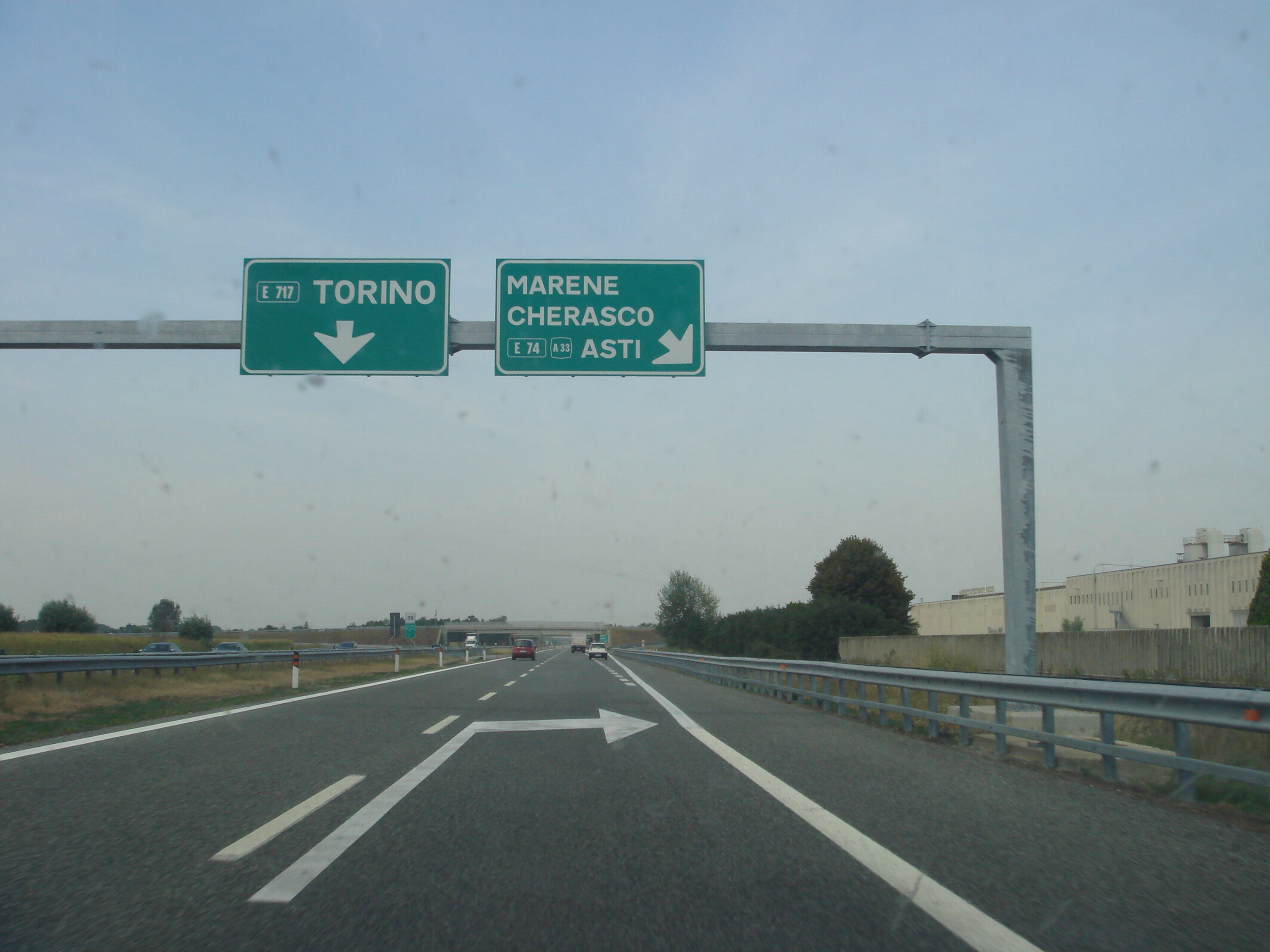
European route 717 near Isola d'Asti.

European route E 717 is a European B class road in Italy, connecting the cities Turin — Savona. It has a total length of 141 km (88 mi).

== Route ==
- Italy
  - E70, E64, E612 Turin
  - E80 Savona
