= Texas State Highway Spur 10 =

State highway in Texas

State Highway Spur 10

Route information
- Maintained by TxDOT
- Length: 9.1 mi (14.6 km)
- Existed: 1994–present

Major junctions
- South end: SH 36 in Pleak
- Future I-69 / US 59; US 90 Alt.
- North end: SH 36 in Rosenberg

Location
- Country: United States
- State: Texas

Highway system
- Highways in Texas; Interstate; US; State; Former; Toll; Loops; Spurs; FM/RM; Park; Rec
← SH 10	→ FM 10

Texas State Highway Spur 10 (Spur 10) is a spur route in the U.S. state of Texas that remains within Fort Bend County. The highway begins at State Highway 36 (SH 36) near Pleak and runs in a northwesterly direction until it ends at SH 36 northwest of Rosenberg. Northbound traffic on SH 36 can use Spur 10 to avoid passing through Rosenberg. The highway goes entirely through rural areas.

== History ==
On September 26, 1939, Loop 10 was designated to run from SH 114 to SH 121 in Grapevine in Tarrant County via Dallas Road as a renumbering of either SH 114 Loop or SH 121 Loop. Loop 10 was canceled on April 25, 1960 and removed from the highway system in exchange for the creation of Spur 103.

Spur 10 was revived on September 29, 1994 to start on SH 36 at a distance 5.2 miles (8.4 km) northeast of Rosenberg in Fort Bend County. From that point, the spur ran southeast to end at what is now Future Interstate 69/U.S. Route 59 (US 59). In 2010 the certified distance was 4.236 miles (6.817 km). On August 30, 2012, Spur 10 was extended southeast from US 59 to SH 36 in Pleak to make a total distance of 9.1 miles (14.6 km).

== Route description ==
Spur 10 begins at a stop sign on SH 36 in Pleak. There is a Chevron filling station and market on the corner. From its starting point, Spur 10 heads straight northwest 5.0 miles (8.0 km) to a bridge over Future I-69/US 59 and the Union Pacific Railroad tracks. This stretch of the highway is named Gerken Road near Pleak, but as it goes northwest it becomes known as Hartledge Road. Traffic on Spur 10 can access Future I-69/US 59 to the northeast by a feeder road and to the southwest by a ramp off the overpass. From Future I-69/US 59, the highway continues northeast about 1.0 mile (1.6 km) where it turns to the north. Spur 10 continues for a distance of 1.2 miles (1.9 km) to a bridge over U.S. Route 90 Alternate (US 90 Alt.). Traffic on Spur 10 can access US 90 Alt. in both directions. From the overpass, the highway continues in a northerly direction for an additional 1.9 miles (3.1 km) before ending at a stop sign on SH 36. In the stretch from Future I-69/US 59 to SH 36, the highway is also known as Patton Road and falls within the city limits of Rosenberg.

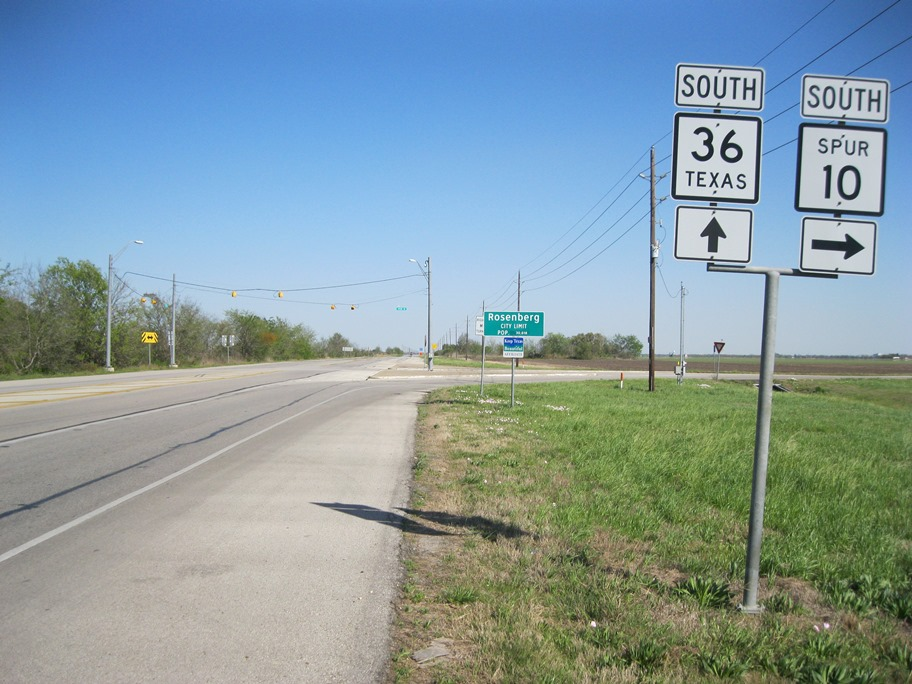
Northern end of Spur 10 on SH 36 looking east-southeast

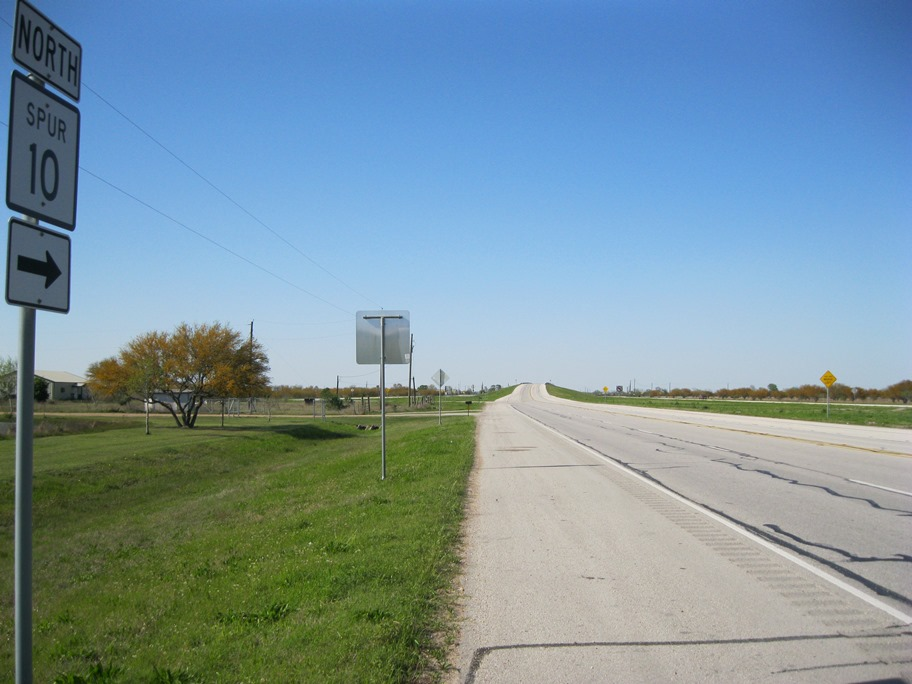
Approach to Spur 10 overpass at US 90 Alt. looking north

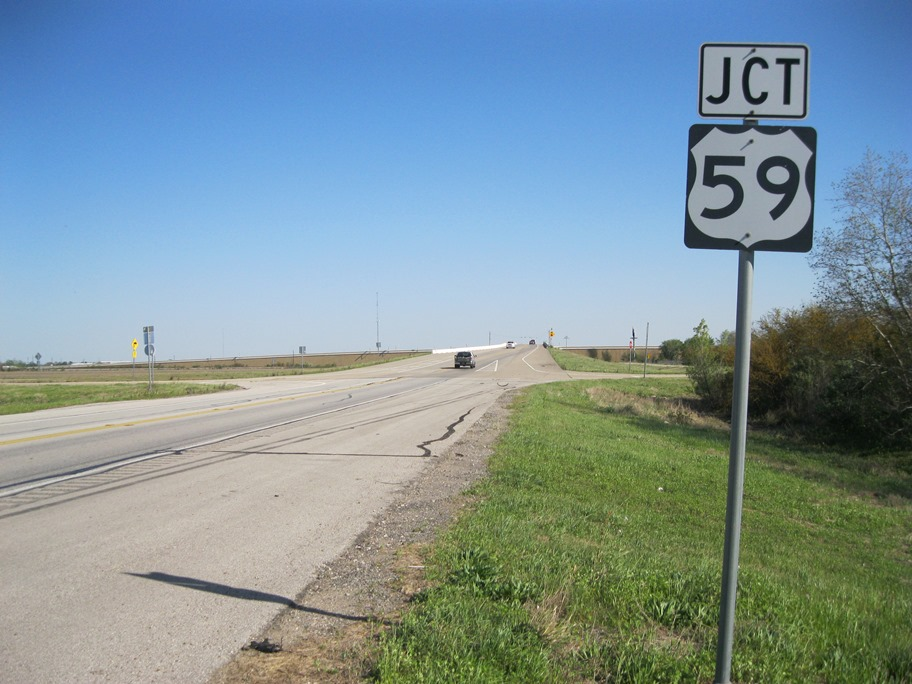
Approach to Spur 10 overpass at Future I-69/US 59 looking southeast

== Major intersections ==
The entire highway is in Fort Bend County.

Location	mi	km	Destinations	Notes
Pleak	0.0	0.0	SH 36 – Needville, Rosenberg	Southern terminus of Spur 10
Rosenberg	5.0	8.0	Future I-69 / US 59 – Wharton, Houston	I-69/US 59 exit 93.
Rosenberg	7.2	11.6	US 90 Alt. – East Bernard, Richmond	
Rosenberg	9.1	14.6	SH 36 – Needville, Wallis	Northern terminus of Spur 10
1.000 mi = 1.609 km; 1.000 km = 0.621 mi
