= Raccordo autostradale RA10 =

Controlled-access highway in Italy

Raccordo autostradale 10
- Motorway connection 10
- Raccordo autostradale Torino-Caselle; Turin–Caselle motorway connection

Route information
- Maintained by ANAS
- Length: 10.7 km (6.6 mi)
- Existed: 1988–present

Major junctions
- South end: Turin
- A55 in Turin
- North end: Caselle Torinese

Location
- Country: Italy
- Regions: Piedmont

Highway system
- Roads in Italy; Autostrade; State; Regional; Provincial; Municipal
← RA 9	→ RA 11

Raccordo autostradale 10 (RA 10; "Motorway connection 10") or Raccordo autostradale Torino-Caselle ("Torino-Caselle motorway connection") is an autostrada (Italian for "motorway") 10.7 kilometres (6.6 mi) long in Italy (with dual carriageway with two lanes for the direction of travel without an emergency lane with central traffic divider of the "New Jersey" type and side parking areas) located in the region of Piedmont that connects the city of Turin with the Turin Caselle Airport located in Caselle Torinese, 11 kilometres (6.8 mi) north of the capital of Piedmont.

== Route ==
RACCORDO AUTOSTRADALE 10; Raccordo autostradale Torino-Caselle
Exit	↓km↓	↑km↑	Province	European Route
Turin	0.0 km (0 mi)	10.7 km (6.6 mi)	TO	--
Cenisia (Note: Exit only towards Turin, entry only towards the airport.); Vallette; Madonna di Campagna	0.3 km (0.19 mi)	10.4 km (6.5 mi)	TO	--
Tangenziale di Torino	2.9 km (1.8 mi)	7.8 km (4.8 mi)	TO	--
Borgaro	4.3 km (2.7 mi)	6.4 km (4.0 mi)	TO	--
di Ceresole; Gran Paradiso National Park; Rivarolo	7.6 km (4.7 mi)	3.1 km (1.9 mi)	TO	--
Caselle - Leini	10.0 km (6.2 mi)	0.7 km (0.43 mi)	TO	--
Lanzo Valleys; Turin Caselle Airport	10.7 km (6.6 mi)	0.0 km (0 mi)	TO	--

== See also ==
- Autostrade of Italy
- Roads in Italy
- Transport in Italy

=== Other Italian roads ===
- State highways (Italy)
- Regional road (Italy)
- Provincial road (Italy)
- Municipal road (Italy)
