= Bruere =

Bruere or Bruère is a surname. Notable people with the surname include:

- George Bruere (died 1743), English MP
- George James Bruere (1720/21–1780), 45th British Governor of Bermuda
- Henry Bruère (1882–1958), American Progressive reformer and banker
- Marc Bruère (1770–1823), Ragusan writer

== See also ==
- Brewer (surname)
