= List of highways numbered 10A =

The following highways are numbered 10A:

== United States ==
- Florida State Road 10A
  - County Road 10A (Florida)
- New York State Route 10A
  - County Route 10A (Cayuga County, New York)
  - County Route 10A (Chenango County, New York)
- North Carolina Highway 10A (Conover) (former)
  - North Carolina Highway 10A (Gibsonville) (former)
  - North Carolina Highway 10A (High Point) (former)
- Oklahoma State Highway 10A
- Route 10A (Vermont–New Hampshire)
