= I.CO.P. =

Italian construction company

I.CO.P. S.p.A. Società Benefit
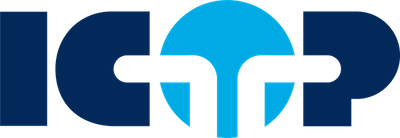
- Type: Private, Società per azioni, Benefit corporation
- Traded as: BIT: ICOP; Euronext Growth
- ISIN: IT0001214433
- Industry: Construction, Civil engineering
- Predecessor: F.lli Costantini e Ing. Petrucco
- Founded: 1920
- Founder: Eng. Paolo Petrucco
- Headquarters: Basiliano (UD), Italy,
- Number of locations: 25 (2020)
- Area served: Europe; Norway; Switzerland
- Key people: Vittorio Petrucco (Chairman); Piero Petrucco (CEO); Paolo Coppetti (CFO); Luca Grillo - Antonio Guerini (General Managers)
- Services: Infrastructure, Deep Foundations, Microtunneling, Maritime works, General Contractor
- Revenue: ▲€ 505.2 million (2025)
- Net income: ▲€ 36.6 million (2025)
- Total assets: ▲€ 639.5 million (2025)
- Total equity: ▲€ 145.4 million (2025)
- Number of employees: ▲1,111 (2025)
- Rating: Cerved A3.1; (equivalent to S&P A−; Moody's A3; Fitch A−)
- Website: https://www.icop.it/en/

I.CO.P. S.p.A. Società Benefit is an Italian construction company founded in 1920.

The company introduced the microtunnel and direct pipe technologies in Italy and is one of the main European players in the foundation sector. It is active in special underground works, maritime works and infrastructure, and is based in Basiliano in the province of Udine.

The company participates in the Eteria Consortium, a construction hub with Itinera of the Gavio Group and Vianini Lavori of the Caltagirone Group.

Since 2024, it has been listed on the Milan Stock Exchange.

== History ==
In 2020 ICOP became the first Benefit corporation in Infrastructure.

It acquired the Ferriera di Servola (Servola ironworks) from Arvedi to convert it for logistics use.

== Major projects ==
In 1991 I.CO.P. introduced microtunneling technology. Since then the company has kept on developing new patented systems for the construction of road and railway underpasses.

In 2009 the company constructed its first microtunnel in Germany, a double crossing of the Reno river with the microtunneling technique, to connect two refineries in Wesseling, Cologne.

In 2010 ICOP realised the motorway Autostrada A34.

In 2013 the company started the works on the Cityringen Metro Project. The new underground ring has a total length of 17,4 km and connects all central areas of Copenhagen.

In 2014 the company became an Eiffage partner for the execution of some lots (Line 15 and Line 16) of the Grand Paris Express, one of the most ambitious projects linked to urban transformation.

In 2016 the design and execution of consolidation works and improvement of soil quality with cement injections in Gravelines Nuclear Power Station as part of the “Post Fukushima” project.

Projects include the TAP gas pipeline or the Logistic Platform in the port of Trieste (now controlled by the port of Hamburg), and the Ariane 6 launch pad for the European Space Agency in French Guiana. Works also included participation in the new Stadio Friuli and the foundations for the Grattacielo Intesa Sanpaolo and the new Genoa-Saint George Bridge.

== See also ==
- Infrastructure
- Microtunneling
- Deep foundation
- Maritime infrastructure
