= Marene =

- Comune
- Comune di Marene
- Location within Italy Location within Piedmont
- Coordinates: 44°40′N 7°44′E
- Country: Italy
- Region: Piedmont
- Province: Province of Cuneo (CN)
- Frazioni: Castello Della Salza, Costa Trucchi, Mondini, San Bernardo, Sperina Alta, Sperina Bassa, Tetti Famolassi, Valle Di Sopra

Government
  - Mayor: Roberta Barbero

Area
  - Total: 29.0 km^{2} (11.2 sq mi)
- Elevation: 310 m (1,020 ft)

Population (1-1-2017)
  - Total: 3,248
  - Density: 112/km^{2} (290/sq mi)
- Demonym: Marenese(i)
- Time zone: UTC+1 (CET)
  - Summer (DST): UTC+2 (CEST)
- Postal code: 12030
- Dialing code: 0172
- Website: Official website

Marene is a comune (municipality) in the Province of Cuneo in the Italian region of Piedmont, located about 45 kilometres (28 mi) south of Turin and about 35 kilometres (22 mi) northeast of Cuneo. As of 1 January 2017, it had a population of 3,248 and an area of 29.0 square kilometres (11.2 mi^{2}).

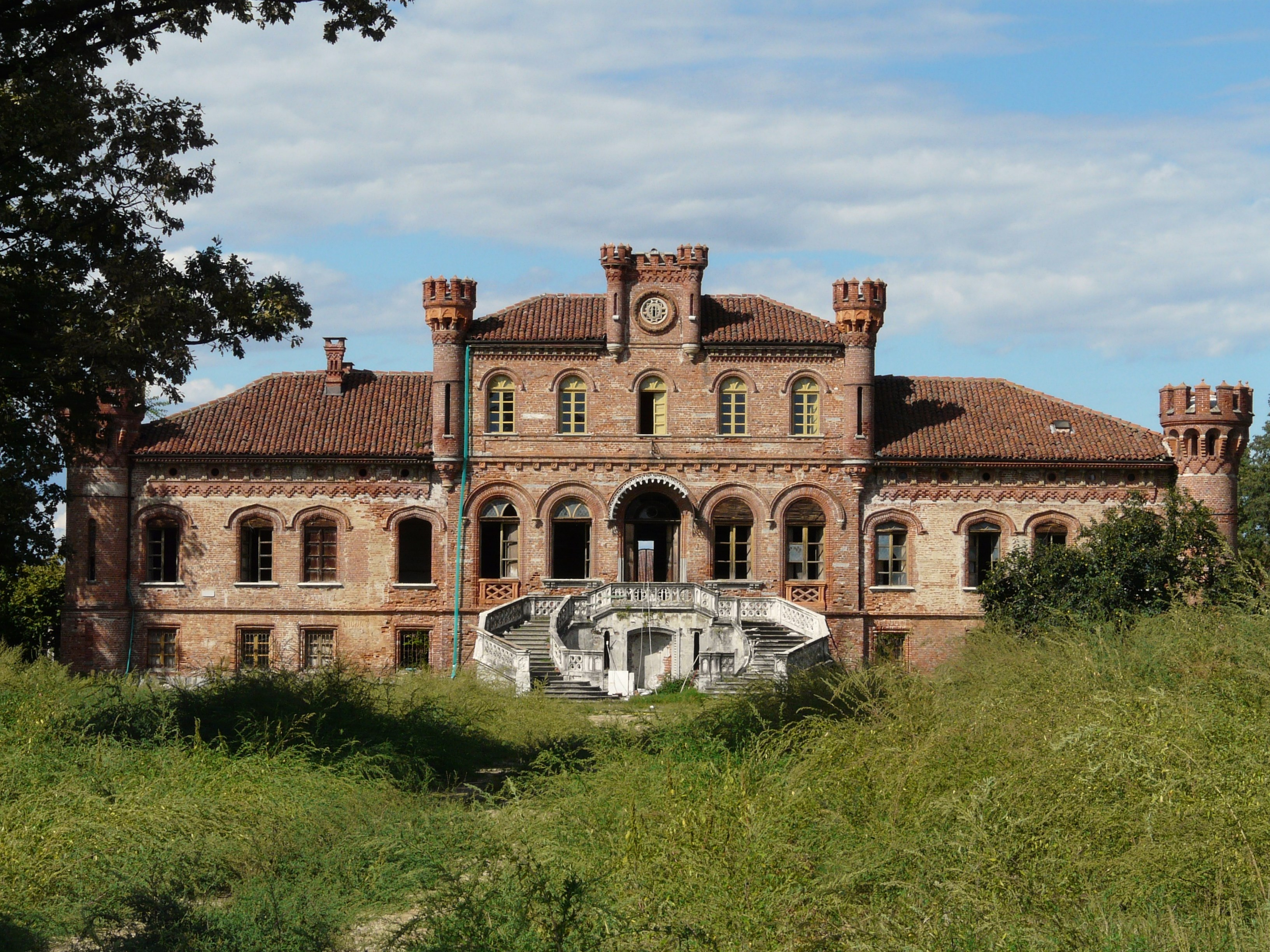
Neo-Gothic Castle, Marene, Piedmont, Italy

Marene borders the following municipalities: Cavallermaggiore, Cervere, Cherasco, and Savigliano.

== Demographic evolution ==
Historical population

Year	Pop.	±%
1861	2,334	—
1871	2,528	+8.3%
1881	2,471	−2.3%
1901	2,381	−3.6%
1911	2,332	−2.1%

Year	Pop.	±%
1921	2,440	+4.6%
1931	2,389	−2.1%
1936	2,370	−0.8%
1951	2,386	+0.7%
1961	2,038	−14.6%

Year	Pop.	±%
1971	1,825	−10.5%
1981	2,347	+28.6%
1991	2,523	+7.5%
2001	2,703	+7.1%

Source: Data from ISTAT
