= Fréjus Road Tunnel =

Road tunnel through the Alps between France and Italy

Coordinates: 45°08′27″N 6°41′20″E

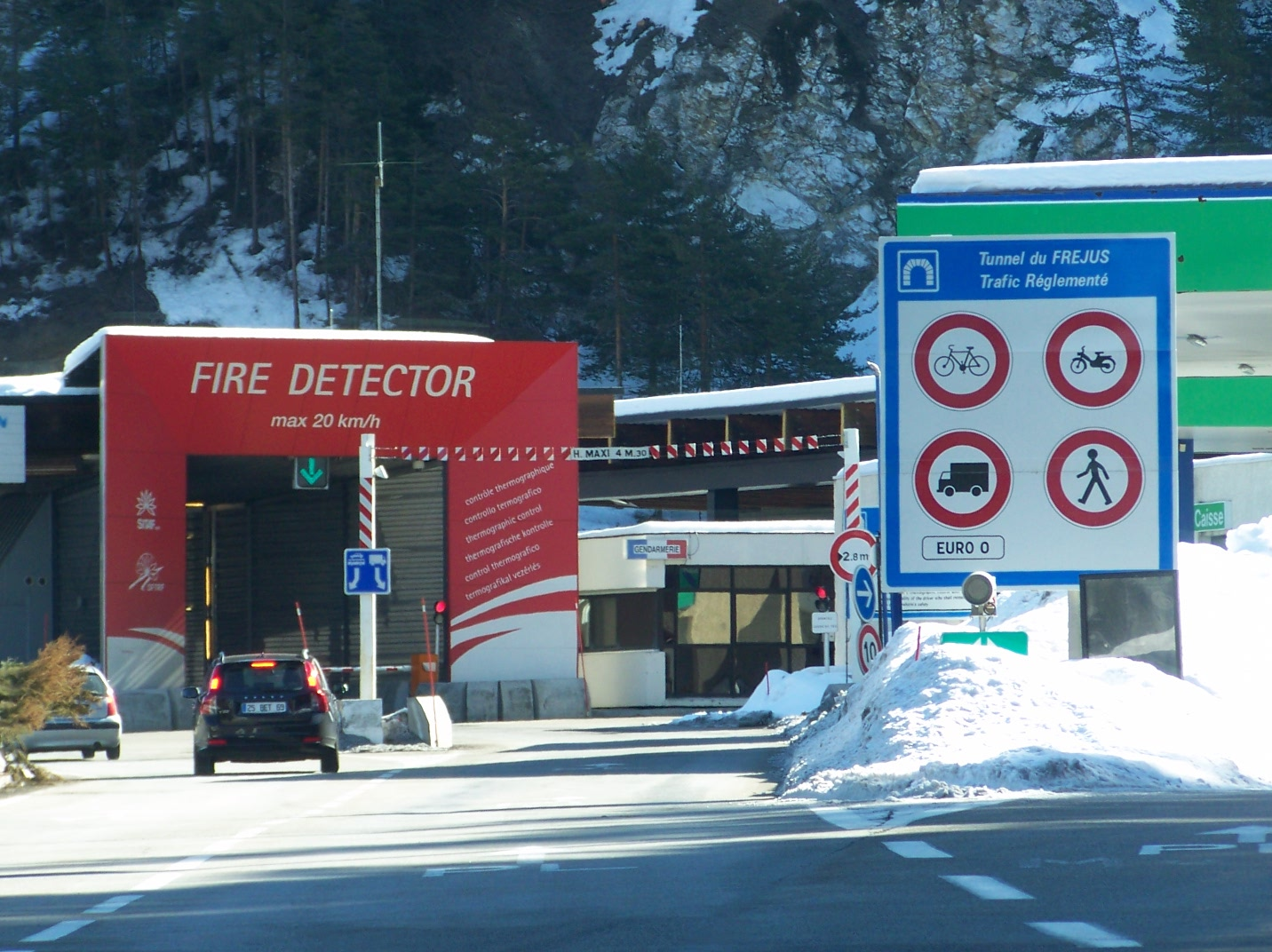
- The French entrance to the tunnel at Modane
- Interactive map of Fréjus Road Tunnel

Overview
- Other names: Traforo del Fréjus (Italian); Tunnel du Fréjus (French)
- Route: E70 / N 543; E70 / T 4
- Crosses: Cottian Alps
- Start: France
- End: Italy

Operation
- Work began: 1974
- Opened: 12 July 1980
- Traffic: Automotive
- Character: Passenger, freight

Technical
- Length: 12.87 km (8.00 mi)
- No. of lanes: 2
- Operating speed: 70 km/h (43 mph)

The Fréjus Road Tunnel (Italian: Traforo del Fréjus, French: Tunnel du Fréjus) is a tunnel that connects France and Italy. The tunnel runs for 13 km (8.1 mi) under Col du Fréjus in the Cottian Alps between Modane in France and Bardonecchia in Italy. It is one of the major trans-Alpine transport routes between France and Italy being used for 80% of the commercial road traffic.

The French section is managed by the French company SFTRF (Société Française du Tunnel Routier du Fréjus), (Note: The French politician Pierre Dumas was chairman of SFTRF from 1962 to 1989) and the Italian section by the Italian company SITAF (Società Italiana per il Traforo Autostradale del Frejus). The tunnel can be reached from the Italian side by the A32 Turin–Bardonecchia motorway, or by SS335 from Oulx, which joins SS24 ("del Monginevro"), before reaching Bardonecchia. From the French side, it can be reached by the A43 ("l'Autoroute de la Maurienne") from Lyon and Chambéry. A toll is charged to all traffic.

== Construction ==
=== First bore ===
Construction of the tunnel started in 1974, coming into service on 12 July 1980, leading to the closure of the motorail shuttle service in the Fréjus Rail Tunnel. It cost 2 billion francs (equivalent to €700 million at 2005 prices). It is the twentythird longest road tunnel in the world and the longest road tunnel that crosses an international border. The single bore carried traffic in both directions simultaneously.

=== Second bore ===
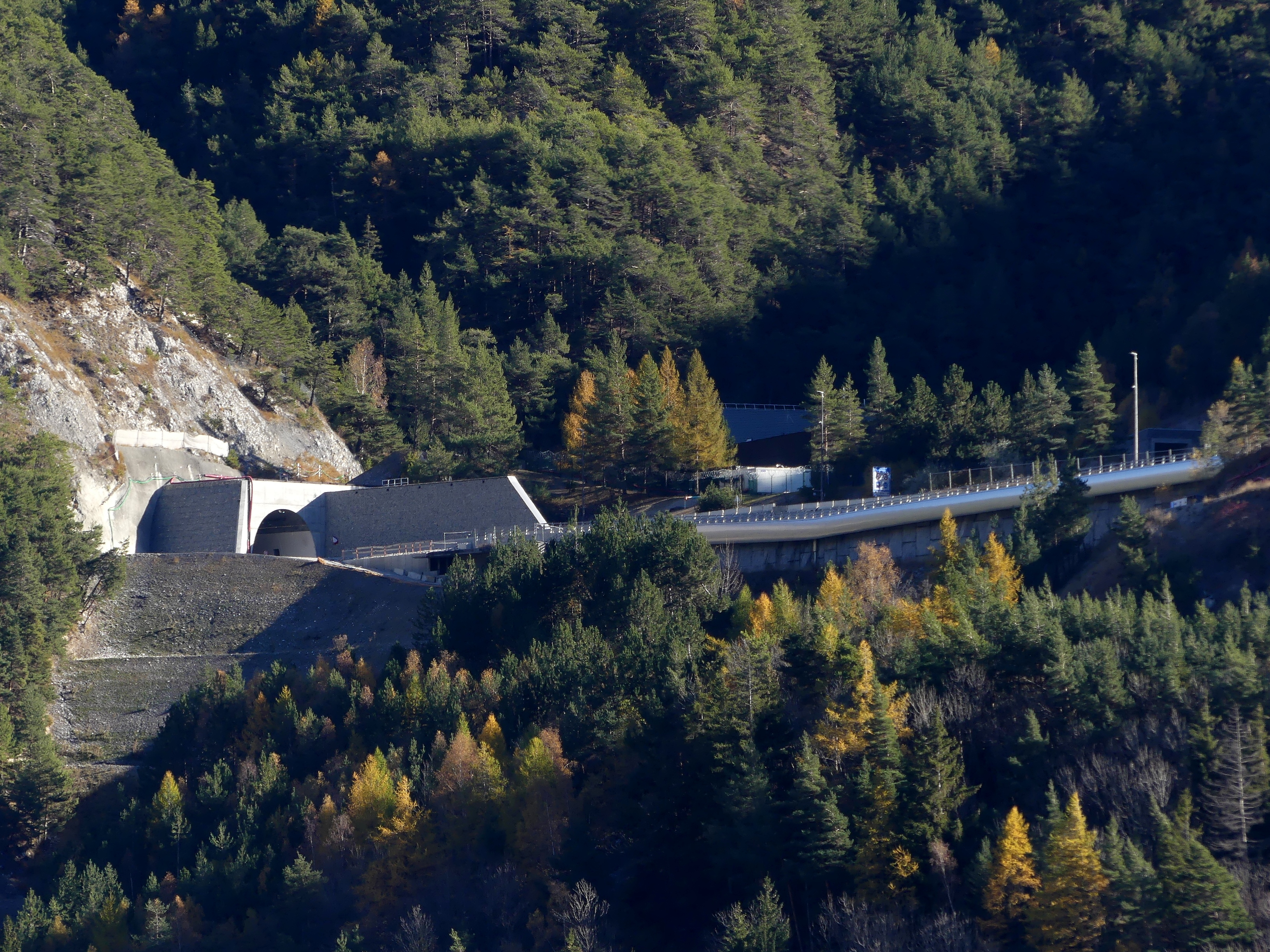
French side of the second bore in 2021 before its completion

Tunneling for the second bore of the tunnel began in 2009, following EU regulations put in place after the Mont Blanc Tunnel fire. Originally planned as an 8 m (26 ft) wide rescue tunnel, an agreement was reached in 2012 to open the new bore to traffic towards France while converting one lane of the existing bore into an emergency lane. The breakthrough occurred on 17 November 2014. The new bore is parallel to the existing one at a distance of 50 m (55 yd), and was opened to traffic on 1 August 2025. As there will still be a single lane for each direction (the other lane being an emergency lane), the capacity of the tunnel remained unchanged.

== Safety ==
Following a major fire in the Mont Blanc tunnel in 1999, measures were taken at the start of 2000 to improve safety in the tunnel. A strict 70 km/h (43 mph) speed limit, and a safe distance of 150 m (160 yd) between vehicles was imposed. The tunnel was equipped with the latest smoke and flame detectors, and a system of video cameras was used to detect the speed of traffic, as well as fire and smoke. Temperature sensors were installed at short intervals throughout the tunnel, monitored from a central control room. Fire hydrants were installed every 130 m (140 yd), fed from large water tanks. There are eleven pedestrian safety shelters along the tunnel, equipped with telephones and loud speakers connected to the control room, and with a separate supply of fresh air. These are separated from the main tunnel by two fire doors; the outer door closes automatically when the temperature in the tunnel reaches a certain level. Finally there is a ‘thermal gate’ system at each entrance to identify any overheating vehicles.

Despite these measures, on 4 June 2005, a fire caused the death of two Slovak lorry drivers, and the closure of the tunnel to traffic for several weeks. It reopened to cars on 4 August 2005, and later to commercial vehicles. The tunnel was also briefly closed due to non-fatal fires on 9 January 2007, 29 November 2010, and 10 April 2014.

The second bore improves the safety by eliminating the risk of collisions with oncoming traffic and by providing interconnections between the two bores, five of which can be used by emergency vehicles.

Firefighting personnel comprise four intervention teams: one positioned at each of the entrances, and two inside the tunnel, about 4 km (2.5 mi) from each end.

== Fréjus Underground Laboratory ==
Near the midpoint of the tunnel is the Laboratoire Souterrain de Modane (also referred to as the Fréjus Underground Laboratory). The laboratory houses the Neutrino Ettore Majorana Observatory (NEMO experiment), an international collaboration of scientists searching for neutrinoless double beta decay. An observation of neutrinoless double beta decay would be evidence that neutrinos are Majorana particles and could be used to measure the neutrino mass. Attempts are underway to build a larger laboratory, either in the same tunnel or in the even deeper Lyon Turin Ferroviaire 15 km (9.3 mi) to the East.
