= Autostrada A10 (Italy) =

Controlled-access highway in Italy

Autostrada A10
- Autostrada dei Fiori; Flowers motorway

Route information
- Part of E25, E74 and E80
- Maintained by ANAS
- Length: 158.1 km (98.2 mi)
- Existed: 1967–present

Major junctions
- East end: Genoa
- A7 in Genoa; A26 in Genoa; A6 in Albisola Superiore; A8 autoroute in Ventimiglia
- West end: Ventimiglia

Location
- Country: Italy
- Regions: Liguria

Highway system
- Roads in Italy; Autostrade; State; Regional; Provincial; Municipal
← A 9	→ A 11

The Autostrada A10 or Autostrada dei Fiori ("Flowers motorway") is an autostrada (Italian for "motorway") 158.1 kilometres (98.2 mi) long in Italy located in the region of Liguria connecting Genoa and Ventimiglia to France. It is a part of the E25, E74 and E80 European routes. It connects to the French A8 autoroute, which finishes in Aix-en-Provence.

== History ==
The route from Genoa to Savona was opened on 5 September 1967, and the route from Savona to Ventimiglia was opened on 6 November 1971.

Between Genoa and Savona, the highway has been improved three times in recent times: the northern route, in the direction of Ventimiglia, has been renovated, while the opposite direction, towards Genoa, is now the original road, which formerly consisted of both directions. Accordingly, this side is of lower quality than the other; the widening of the road to three lanes has necessitated the removal of the emergency lane, and a reduction of all lanes to less than 3.75 m (12.3 ft) - this is less than the regulations of the Italian highway code, and has in turn caused a reduction of the speed limit to 80 km/h (50 mph) for most of the section between Albisola and Genoa Voltri.

The route between Savona and the Italian border, on the other hand, is completely new, having been built in the sixties; it consists of two carriageways side by side, with two lanes in each direction. It has, however, no emergency lane, but includes several places in which it is suitable to make an emergency stop.

On 14 August 2018, a section of the Ponte Morandi bridge that formed part of the A10 collapsed during a storm, killing 43 people.

== The Autostrada today ==
The route is currently run by two companies: from Genoa to Savona, by the company Autostrade Italy SpA, and from Savona to the border by Autostrada dei Fiori SpA. It has 22 entrances, and includes eight service stations.

Much of the route is built on hillside, with a series of viaducts and tunnels; for this reason, the entire motorway requires paying a toll charge (one of the most expensive in Italy). Past Savona, the motorway visits Albenga, Imperia, San Remo, and Ventimiglia: six kilometres from Ventimiglia, it reaches the border with France. Until the nineties, the border was marked by a change of stripe colour, from yellow to white, alongside a sign in the tunnel indicating the precise location of the border—this is now gone, although its former location can still be discerned from a change of lighting systems, and the different thicknesses of asphalt.

In the opposite direction, the A10 intersects with the A6, towards Turin, the A26, towards the Po Valley, Switzerland, and other major cities in the north of Italy, before finally joining the A7, towards Milan and Tuscany.

The highway has 78 tunnels between Genoa and Nice.

== Route ==
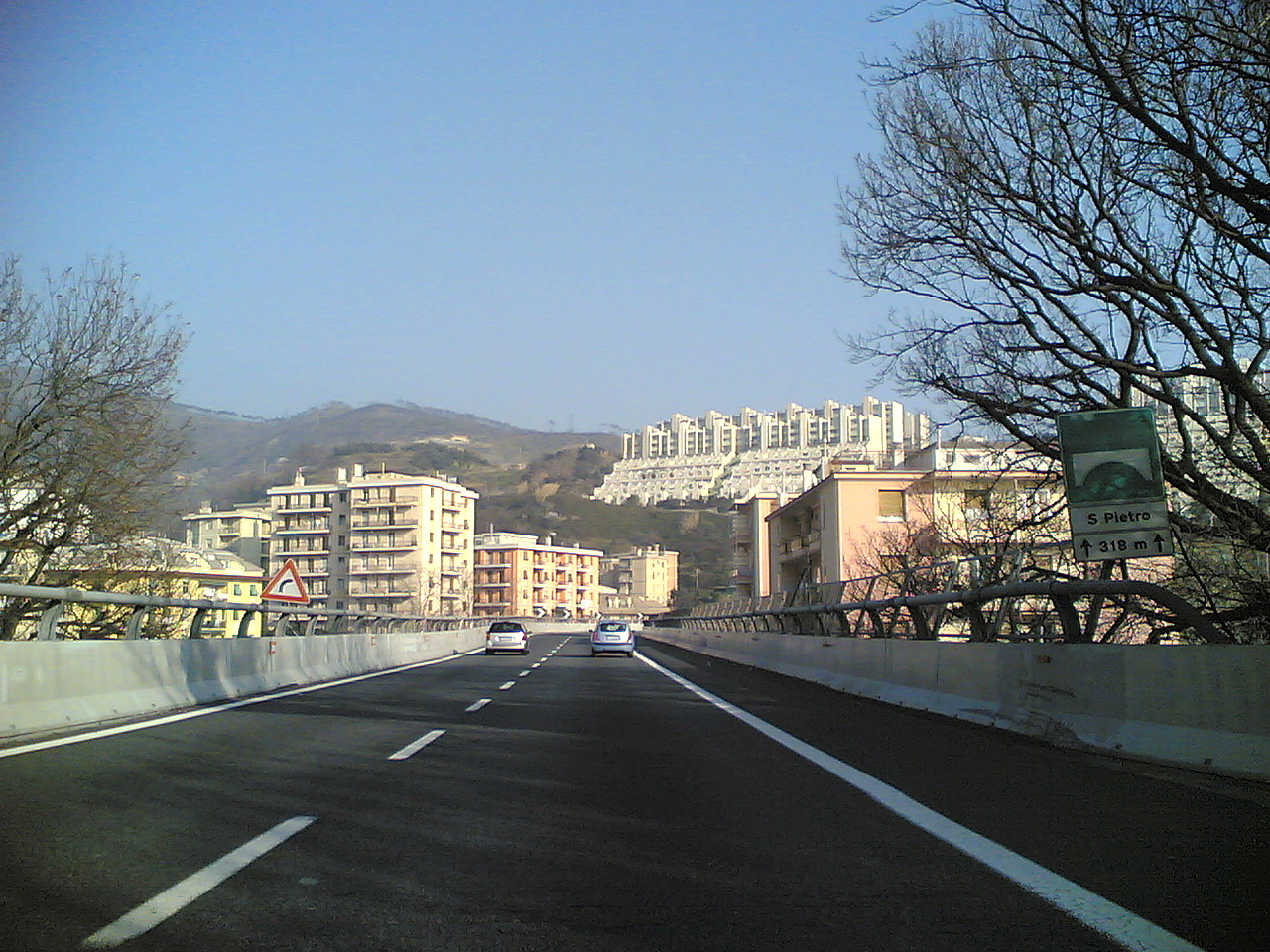
Autostrada A10 near Genoa

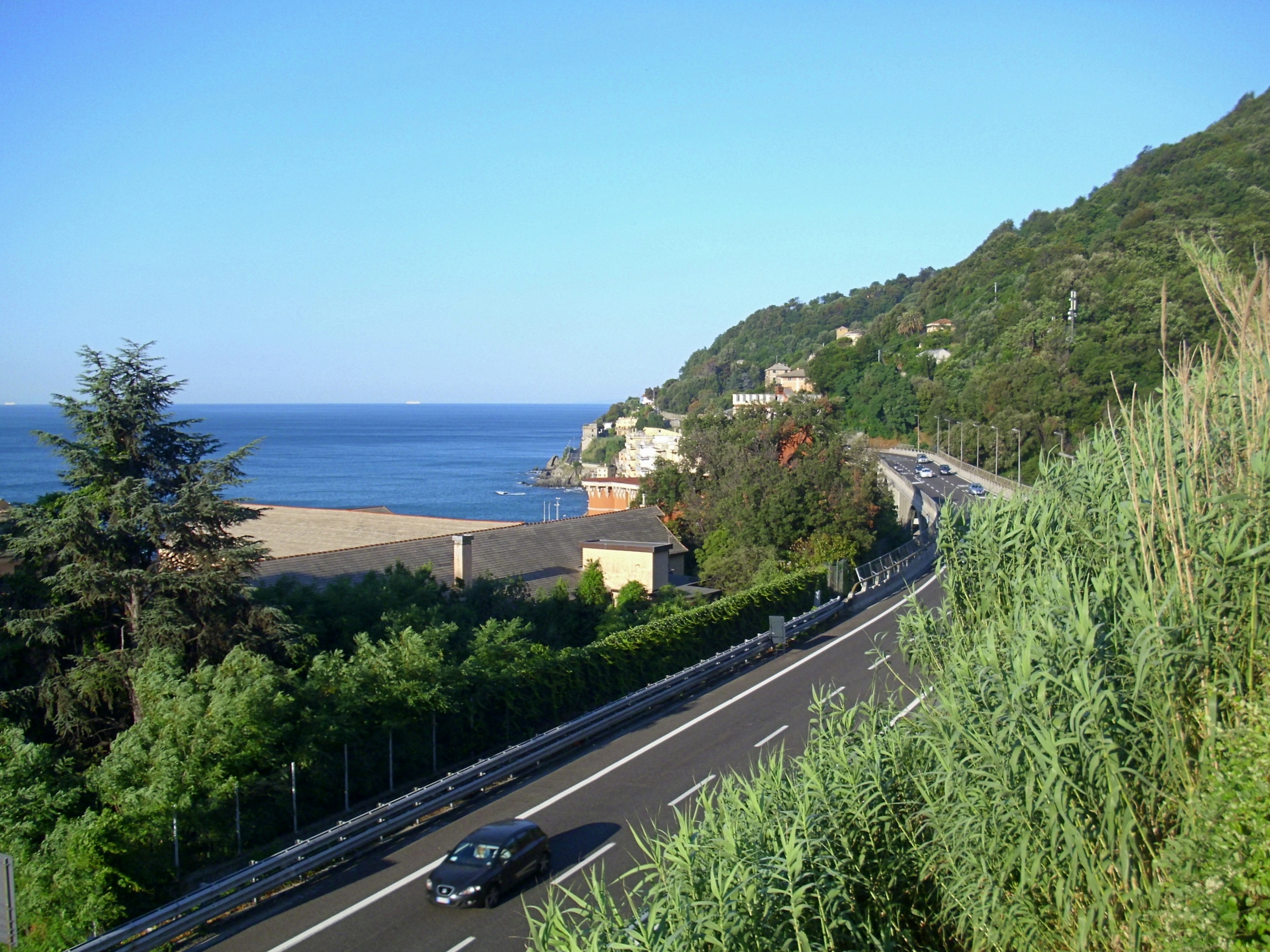
Autostrada A10 near Voltri

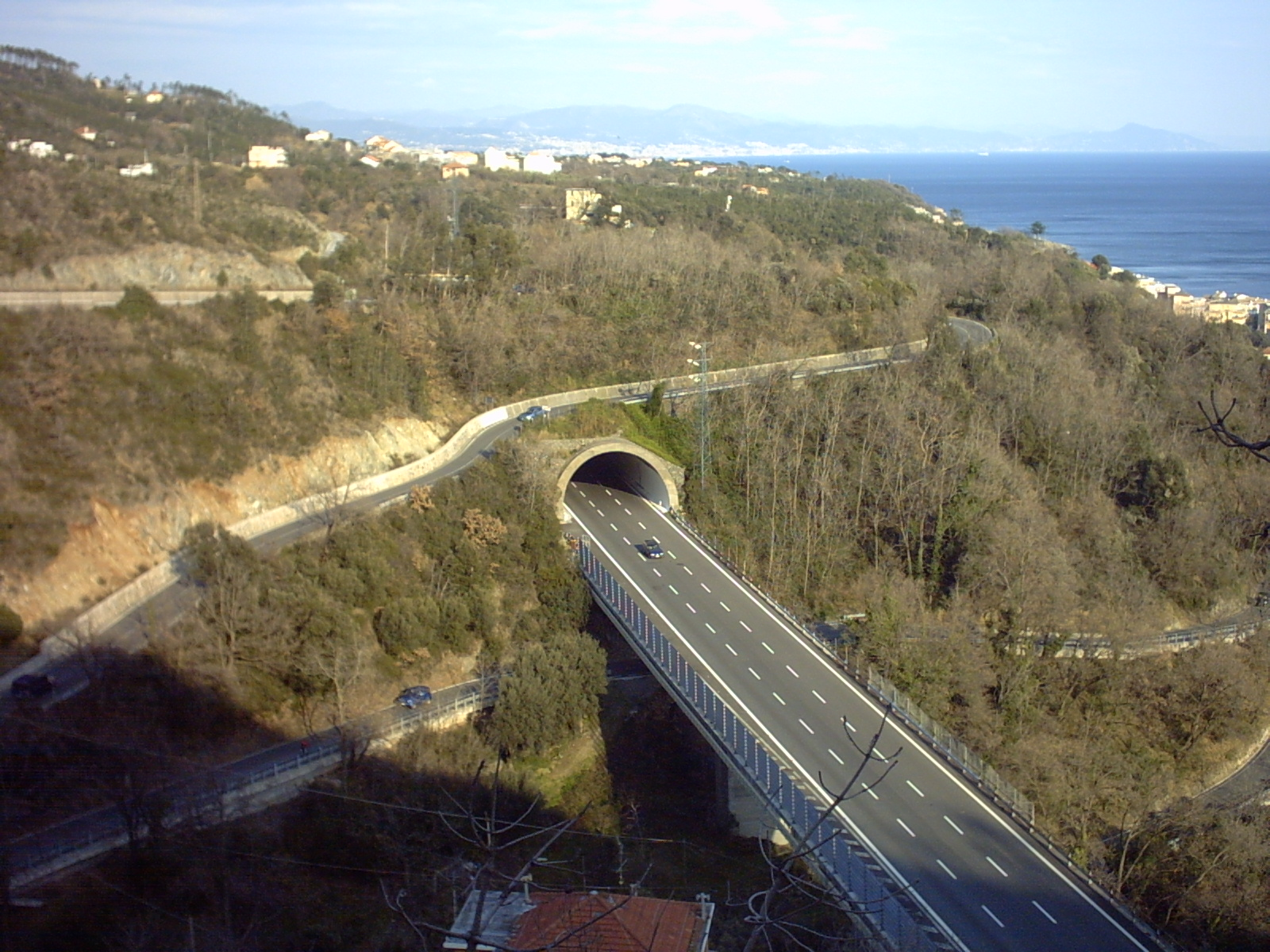
Autostrada A10 near Cogoleto

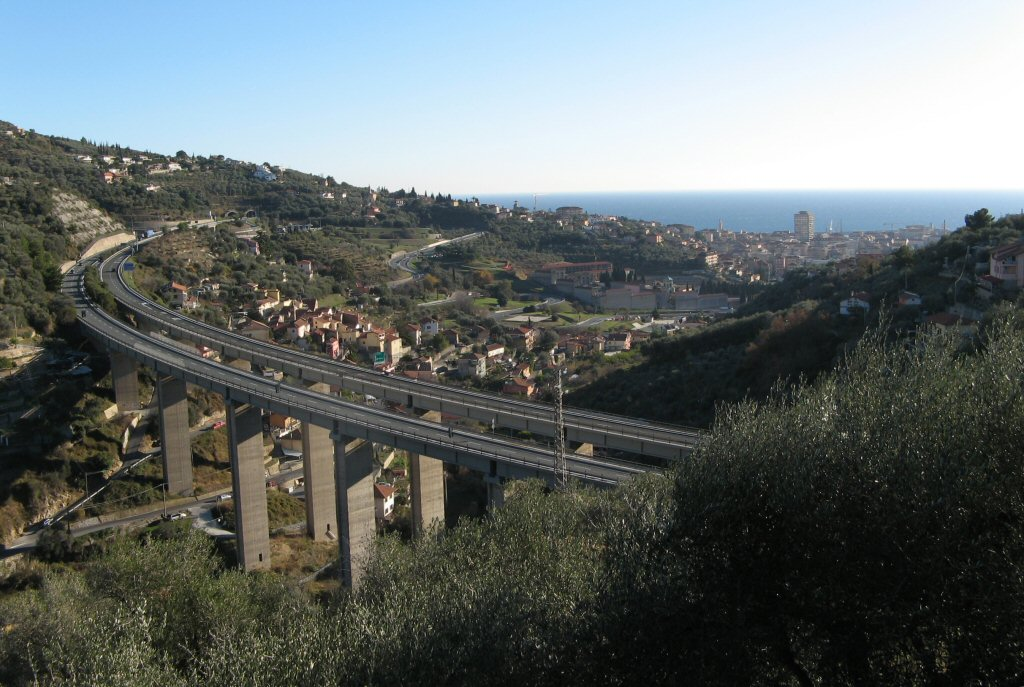
Autostrada A10 near Imperia

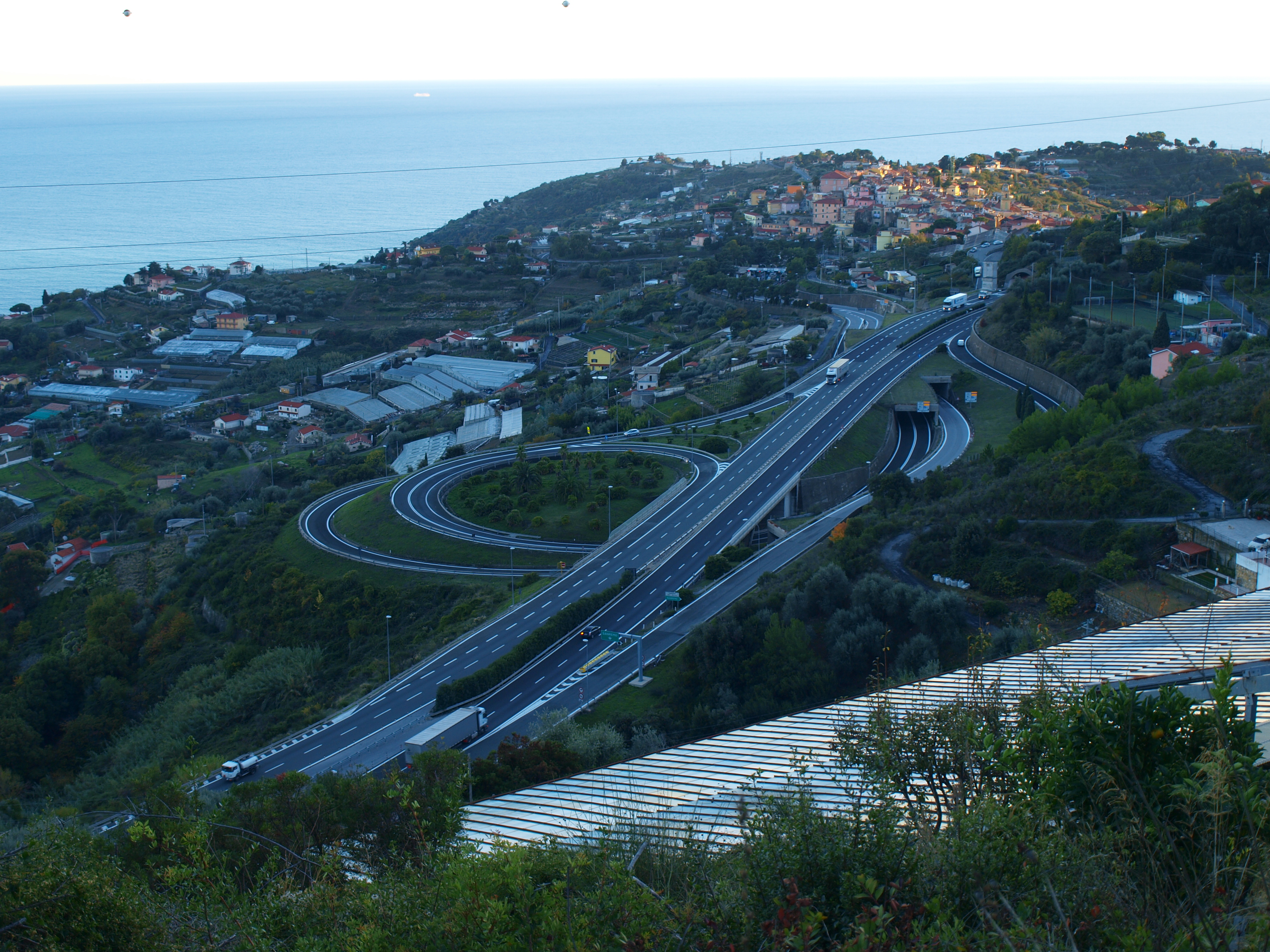
Autostrada A10 near Sanremo

GENOVA – VENTIMIGLIA; Autostrada dei Fiori
Exit	↓km↓	↑km↑	Province	European route
Milano; Livorno; Genova Sampierdarena	0 km (0 mi)	158.1 km (98.2 mi)	GE	E80; E25
Genoa Airport; Genoa Christopher Columbus Airport	2 km (1.2 mi)	156 km (97 mi)	GE	E80; E25
Genoa Pegli	6 km (3.7 mi)	152 km (94 mi)	GE	E80; E25
Genova Pra'	11 km (6.8 mi)	147 km (91 mi)	GE	E80; E25
Alessandria - Gravellona Toce	13 km (8.1 mi)	145 km (90 mi)	GE	E80; E25
Arenzano	20 km (12 mi)	138 km (86 mi)	GE	E80
Rest area "Piani d'Invrea"	26 km (16 mi)	132 km (82 mi)	SV	E80
Varazze	27 km (17 mi)	131 km (81 mi)	SV	E80
Celle Ligure	32 km (20 mi)	126 km (78 mi)	SV	E80
Albisola	36 km (22 mi)	120 km (75 mi)	SV	E80
Rest area "San Cristoforo"	42 km (26 mi)	116 km (72 mi)	SV	E80
Complanare Savona; Torino; Savona; Rest area "Aurelia Sud"	44 km (27 mi)	113 km (70 mi)	SV	E80
Rest area "Valleggia Nord" (Note: Only in the direction of Genova)/ref>	--	110 km (68 mi)	SV	E80
Spotorno	52 km (32 mi)	106 km (66 mi)	SV	E80
Rest area "Borsana Sud" (Note: Only in the direction of Ventimiglia)	55 km (34 mi)	--	SV	E80
Feglino (Note: Exit only westbound, entry only eastbound)	60 km (37 mi)	99 km (62 mi)	SV	E80
Finale Ligure	63 km (39 mi)	95 km (59 mi)	SV	E80
Pietra Ligure	68 km (42 mi)	90 km (56 mi)	SV	E80
Borghetto Santo Spirito	72 km (45 mi)	86 km (53 mi)	SV	E80
Rest area "Ceriale"	77 km (48 mi)	81 km (50 mi)	SV	E80
Albenga	81 km (50 mi)	77 km (48 mi)	SV	E80
Andora	93 km (58 mi)	65 km (40 mi)	SV	E80
Rest area "Rinovo"	95 km (59 mi)	--	SV	E80
Rest area "Valle Chiappa"	--	60 km (37 mi)	SV	E80
San Bartolomeo al Mare	104 km (65 mi)	58 km (36 mi)	IM	E80
Imperia Est	112 km (70 mi)	52 km (32 mi)	IM	E80
Imperia Ovest	119 km (74 mi)	46 km (29 mi)	IM	E80
Rest area "Conioli"	--	38 km (24 mi)	IM	E80
Rest area "Castellaro"	123 km (76 mi)	--	IM	E80
Arma di Taggia	128 km (80 mi)	30 km (19 mi)	IM	E80
Sanremo	136 km (85 mi)	19 km (12 mi)	IM	E80
Rest area "Bordighera"	143 km (89 mi)	15 km (9.3 mi)	IM	E80
Bordighera	146 km (91 mi)	12 km (7.5 mi)	IM	E80
Ventimiglia; Toll gate Col de Tende - Cuneo; Rest area "Autoporto"	151.8 km (94.3 mi)	6 km (3.7 mi)	IM	E80; E74
Ventimiglia border post	151.8 km (94.3 mi)	6 km (3.7 mi)	IM	E80; E74
A8 autoroute - Menton - Monaco - Nice; France–Italy border	158.1 km (98.2 mi)	0 km (0 mi)	IM	E80; E74

== See also ==
- Autostrade of Italy
- Roads in Italy
- Transport in Italy

=== Other Italian roads ===
- State highways (Italy)
- Regional road (Italy)
- Provincial road (Italy)
- Municipal road (Italy)
