= Autostrada A33 (Italy) =

Controlled-access highway in Italy

Autostrada A33

Route information
- Maintained by ANAS
- Length: 54.7 km (34.0 mi)
- Existed: 2005–present

Major junctions
- East end: Asti
- West end: Cuneo

Location
- Country: Italy
- Regions: Piedmont

Highway system
- Roads in Italy; Autostrade; State; Regional; Provincial; Municipal
← A 32	→ A 34

The Autostrada A33 is a planned autostrada (Italian for "motorway") 54.7 kilometres (34.0 mi) long in Italy located in the region of Piedmont intended to connect Asti to Cuneo. The motorway is expected to open in 2024.

It had been proposed to name it Autostrada del Tartufo (lit. 'truffle highway') to recall the local truffle-growing industry, however this proposal was not followed up. Its construction cost €150 million.

== See also ==
- Autostrade of Italy
- Roads in Italy
- Transport in Italy

=== Other Italian roads ===
- State highways (Italy)
- Regional road (Italy)
- Provincial road (Italy)
- Municipal road (Italy)
