= Turin metropolitan area =

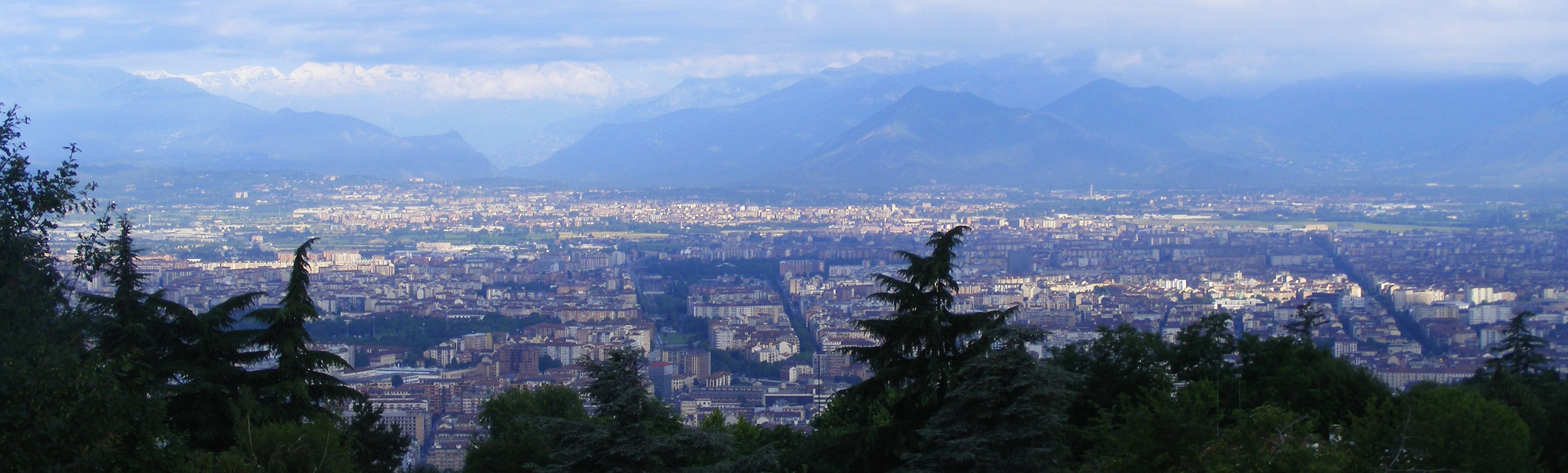
The urban agglomeration seen from east (Turin's hills) to west (Susa Valley)

The Turin metropolitan area is the urban agglomeration centred on the city of Turin in the Piedmont region of north-west Italy. It is defined statistically and does not correspond to a single area of local government. Administratively it comprises the comune (municipality) of Turin plus 53 further communes, all of which fall within the Metropolitan City of Turin.

The metropolitan area has a total population of 1,646,064 estimated by the OECD and an area of 1,127 km^{2}, giving a density of 1,461 people per square kilometre. It is the fourth most populous metropolitan area in Italy. 51% of the population lives within the city of Turin.

== Composition ==
The Turin metropolitan area includes the city of Turin and 53 municipalities, the most important of these by population are Turin, Moncalieri, Collegno, Rivoli, Settimo Torinese and Nichelino:

Province	Municipality	Area (km^{2})	Population
Piedmont
Metropolitan City of Turin	Turin	130.0	847,033
Metropolitan City of Turin	San Mauro Torinese	12.0	18,539
Metropolitan City of Turin	Castiglione Torinese	14.2	6,476
Metropolitan City of Turin	Gassino Torinese	20.5	9,380
Metropolitan City of Turin	Settimo Torinese	36.51	46,678
Metropolitan City of Turin	Brandizzo	6.4	8,649
Metropolitan City of Turin	Chivasso	51.3	26,544
Metropolitan City of Turin	Volpiano	32.4	15,253
Metropolitan City of Turin	San Benigno Canavese	22.2	5,980
Metropolitan City of Turin	Mappano	9.73	7,419
Metropolitan City of Turin	Leinì	31.9	16,300
Metropolitan City of Turin	Borgaro Torinese	11.18	11,843
Metropolitan City of Turin	Caselle Torinese	23.58	13,839
Metropolitan City of Turin	San Maurizio Canavese	17.5	10,173
Metropolitan City of Turin	San Francesco al Campo	15.0	4,820
Metropolitan City of Turin	Cirié	17.8	18,080
Metropolitan City of Turin	San Carlo Canavese	21.0	4,018
Metropolitan City of Turin	Nole	11.3	6,812
Metropolitan City of Turin	Grosso	4.3	959
Metropolitan City of Turin	Mathi	7.1	3,803
Metropolitan City of Turin	Robassomero	8.4	3,070
Metropolitan City of Turin	Venaria Reale	20.3	32,828
Metropolitan City of Turin	Druento	27.7	8,957
Metropolitan City of Turin	Collegno	18.1	49,050
Metropolitan City of Turin	Pianezza	16.5	15,431
Metropolitan City of Turin	Alpignano	12.0	16,711
Metropolitan City of Turin	Caselette	14.0	3,020
Metropolitan City of Turin	Grugliasco	13.1	36,712
Metropolitan City of Turin	Rivoli	29.5	47,299
Metropolitan City of Turin	Rosta	9.0	4,976
Metropolitan City of Turin	Buttigliera Alta	8.3	6,384
Metropolitan City of Turin	Avigliana	23.3	12,540
Metropolitan City of Turin	Beinasco	6.8	17,534
Metropolitan City of Turin	Rivalta di Torino	25.3	20,050
Metropolitan City of Turin	Villarbasse	10.4	3,503
Metropolitan City of Turin	Orbassano	22.1	23,156
Metropolitan City of Turin	Bruino	5.6	8,514
Metropolitan City of Turin	Sangano	6.7	3,723
Metropolitan City of Turin	Piossasco	40.0	18,013
Metropolitan City of Turin	Volvera	20.9	8,578
Metropolitan City of Turin	Nichelino	20.6	46,512
Metropolitan City of Turin	Candiolo	11.9	5,641
Metropolitan City of Turin	None	24.7	7,916
Metropolitan City of Turin	Vinovo	17.7	15,028
Metropolitan City of Turin	Piobesi Torinese	19.7	3,875
Metropolitan City of Turin	Moncalieri	47.0	56,496
Metropolitan City of Turin	La Loggia	12.8	8,821
Metropolitan City of Turin	Trofarello	12.3	10,691
Metropolitan City of Turin	Cambiano	14.2	5,955
Metropolitan City of Turin	Santena	16.2	10,537
Metropolitan City of Turin	Pecetto Torinese	9.2	4,069
Metropolitan City of Turin	Pino Torinese	21.9	8,384
Metropolitan City of Turin	Chieri	54.3	35,869
Metropolitan City of Turin	Baldissero Torinese	15.5	3,623
TOTAL		1,126.6	1,646,064
