= ASD Pro Settimo & Eureka =

Italian football club

ASD Pro Settimo
- Full name: Associazione Sportiva Dilettantistica Pro Settimo & Eureka
- Founded: 2007
- Ground: Stadio Comunale Renzo Valla, Settimo Torinese, Italy
- Capacity: 2,000
- Chairman: Marco Pollastrini
- League: Eccellenza

Associazione Sportiva Dilettantistica Pro Settimo & Eureka (usually referred to as simply Pro Settimo) is an Italian association football club, based in Settimo Torinese, Piedmont. Currently plays in Serie D. The team's colors are white-green-yellow-red.

The club was founded in 2007 by the merger of Eureka Settimo and Pro Settimo Calcio. Since this merger, the new club became one of the most important in Turin area. In the following years, the team won four times the Coppa Italia Dilettanti Piemonte-Valle d'Aosta (2007–2008, 2010–2011, 2012–2013, 2013–2014) and reached the Coppa Italia Dilettanti final in 2007–2008, lost 3–1 in extra time against HinterReggio Calcio.

Pro Settimo & Eureka played in Eccellenza 2007–2008 gaining the promotion to Serie D after they got the third place. In their first season in D, the club came close to play-off (sixth place). In the season 2009–2010, Pro Settimo & Eureka recedes in Eccellenza, then played four years in Eccellenza before returning to Serie D in 2014–2015. It now plays in Eccellenza.
