= Sangano =

- Comune
- Comune di Sangano
- Coat of arms

- Location within Italy Location within Piedmont
- Coordinates: 45°2′N 7°27′E
- Country: Italy
- Region: Piedmont
- Metropolitan city: Turin (TO)

Government
  - Mayor: Agnese Ugues

Area
  - Total: 6.7 km^{2} (2.6 sq mi)
- Elevation: 340 m (1,120 ft)

Population (31 December 2010)
  - Total: 3,777
  - Density: 560/km^{2} (1,500/sq mi)
- Demonym: Sanganesi
- Time zone: UTC+1 (CET)
  - Summer (DST): UTC+2 (CEST)
- Postal code: 10090
- Dialing code: 011
- Patron saint: Assumption of Mary
- Website: Official website

Sangano is a comune (municipality) in the Metropolitan City of Turin in the Italian region Piedmont, located about 20 kilometres (12 miles) west of Turin.

Sangano borders the following municipalities: Reano, Villarbasse, Trana, Rivalta di Torino, Bruino and Piossasco.

== Twin towns ==
- Diamantina, Brazil

== Related articles ==
- Monte Pietraborga
