= Monte Pietraborga =

Mountain in Italy

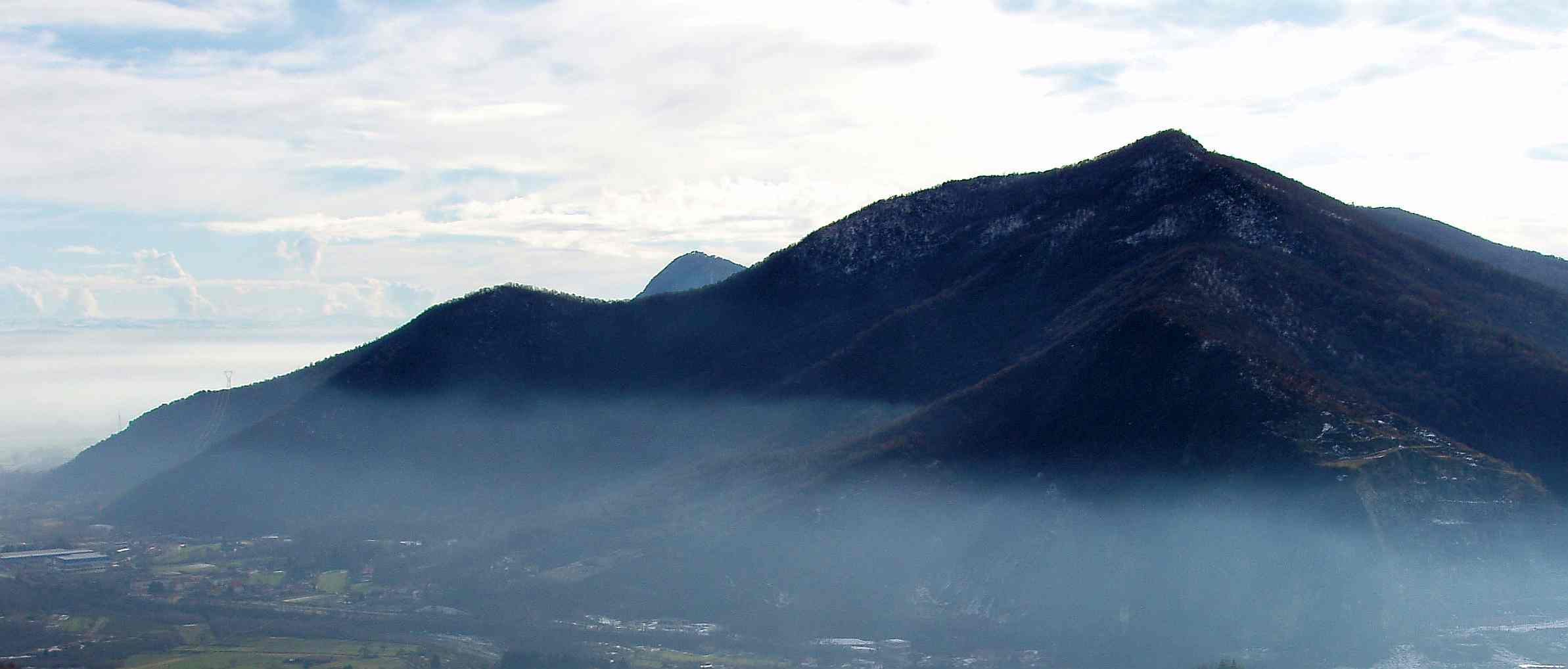
- The mountain as seen from the Moncuni

Highest point
- Elevation: 926 m (3,038 ft)
- Prominence: 326 m (1,070 ft)
- Isolation: 7.16 km (4.45 mi)
- Coordinates: 45°01′18″N 7°25′19″E

Geography
- Location within Italy
- Location: Piedmont, Italy
- Parent range: Cottian Alps

Climbing
- First ascent: ancestral
- Easiest route: hiking from Trana or Sangano

Monte Pietraborga is a mountain in the Cottian Alps, Metropolitan City of Turin in Piedmont, north-western Italy. It is located between the comuni of Trana and Sangano.

== Features ==
The mountain overlooks Trana and belongs to the South flank of the Sangone valley. On its summit three ridges meet: the Eastern one goes down till to a saddle at 658 m then, after regaining some metres of elevation with the Punta del Colletto (685 m), ends up close to the centre of Sangano; the brief North ridge goes down heading to Trana, and the South ridge connects the Pietraborga with Monte San Giorgio.

== Geology ==
The Pietraborga is known by geologists as an example of mountain made of serpentine. North of the mountain a stone quarry operated in the early 20th century.

== History ==
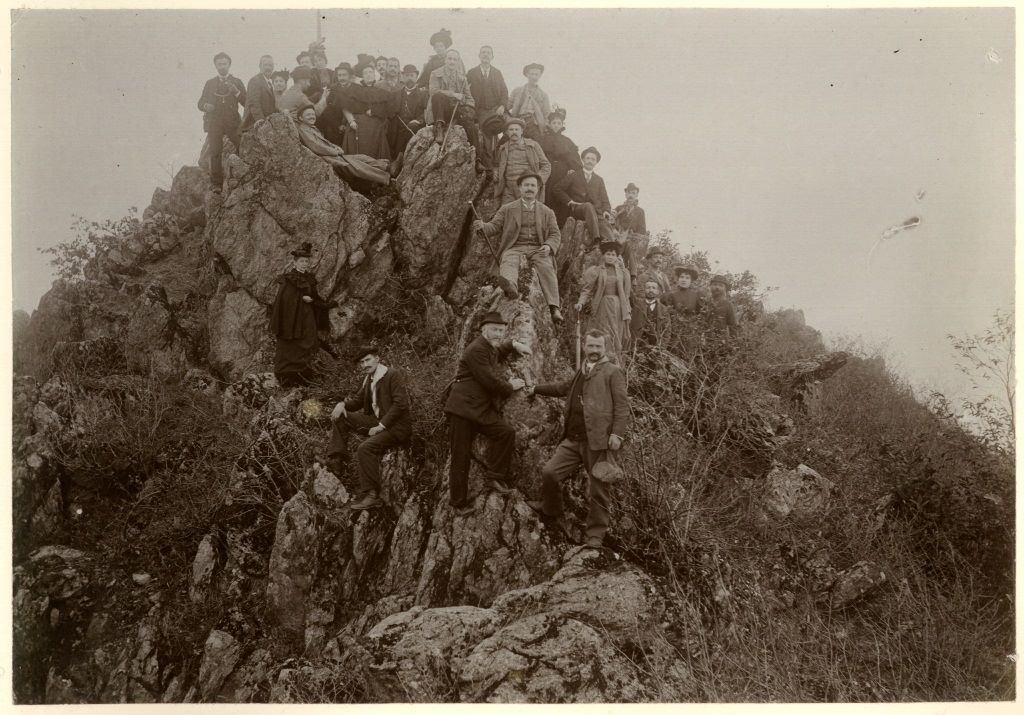
Some hikers on the summit in 1909 (photo of Mario Gabinio)

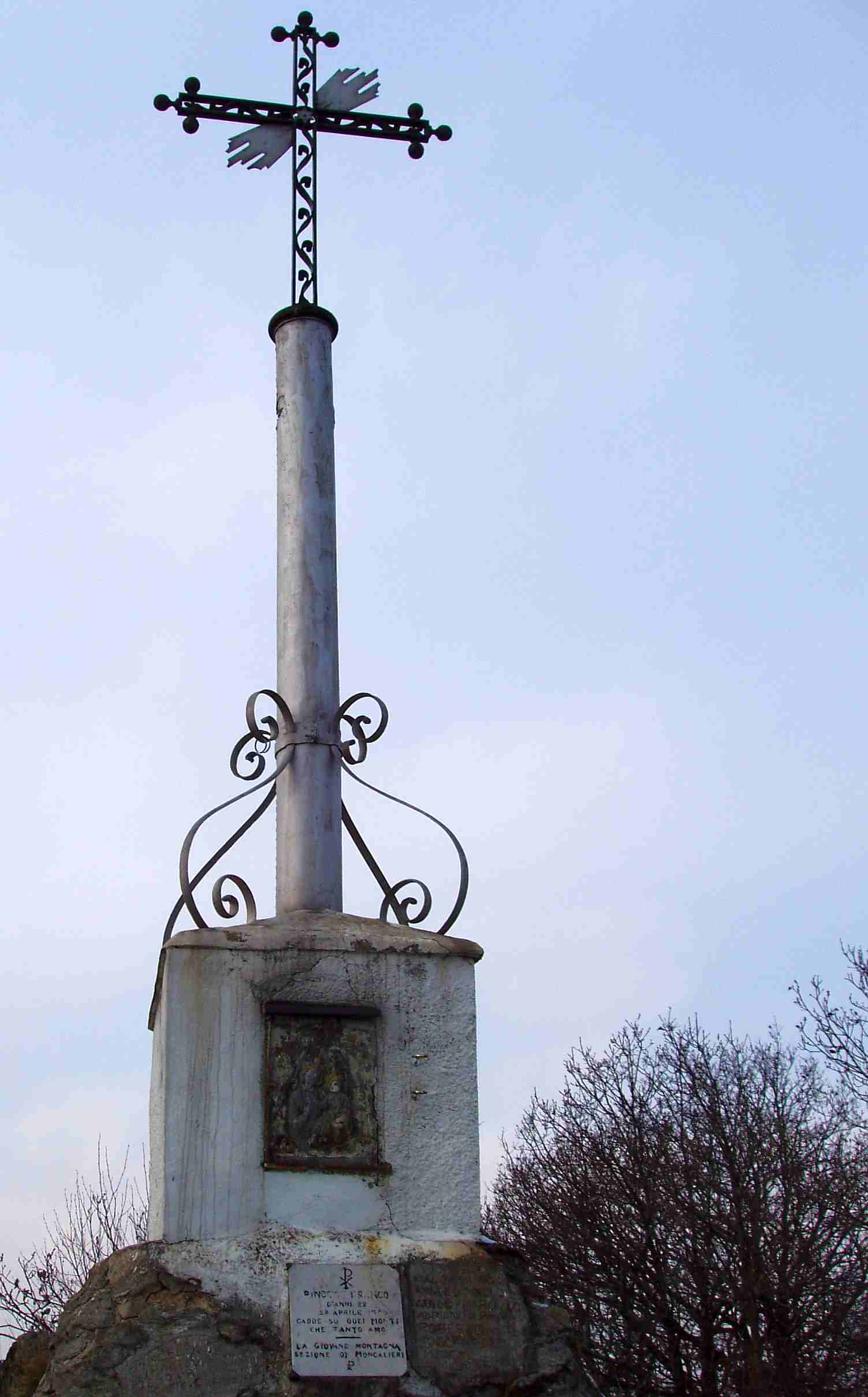
Summit cross

The Pietraborga summit cross was built in 1900. Not faraway from the summit, heading towards Colle Damone, stands a group of boulders interpreted by some people as Celtic remains (dolmens and menhirs roughly arranged in a circle in the so called Sito dei Celti – Celtics' Site).

The village of Pratovigero, located on the Pietraborga slopes facing Trana, was permanently inhabited till to the 1960s.

== Access to the summit ==
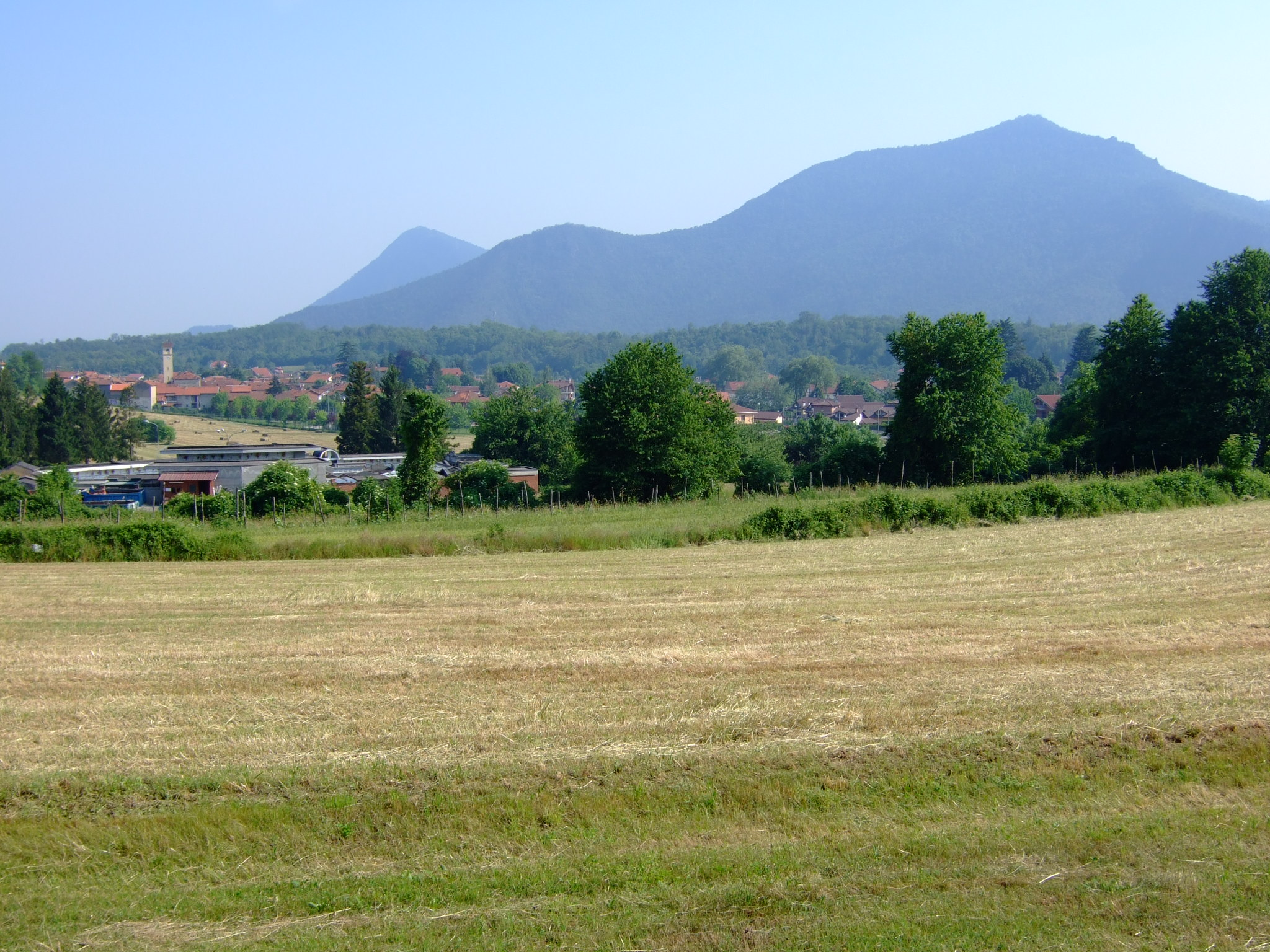
The mountain as seen from Reano countryside

The Pietraborga is mainly a mountain for hikers, and can be reached following a footpath starting from the San Sebastiano chapel in Sangano (Via delle Prese). The route follows the South-Eastern slopes passing by the Cippo De Vitis (460 m), a memorial monument devoted to the Italian partisan Sergio De Vitis, killed by the nazist troops in 1944. There are also shorter ways to reach the summit: one starts from the village of Pratovigero (Trana), easily crossing the Colle Damone (758 m), and another from the Prese di Piossasco, following the South ridge of Pietraborga. A little less easy way, after the Cippo De Vitis, runs on the East ridge of the mountain. Another hiking route is known as Direttissima, and follows a very steep footpath in the wood which directly connects Pratovigero to the summit.

Some stone pinnacles close to the summit are an interesting climbing area, even if the routes are not so long.

The summit of the Pietraborga offers a very appreciated view which ranges from the Monviso to the Turin plain and hillside, and from the Sacra di San Michele to the mountains close to Pinerolo. Even if not located at a high altitude Monte Pietraborga has its own summit register.

== Maps ==
- 6 - Pinerolese Val Sangone, 1:25.000 scale, publisher: Fraternali, Ciriè
- 17 - Torino Pinerolo e Bassa Val di Susa, 1:50.000 scale, publisher: IGC – Istituto Geografico Centrale, Torino
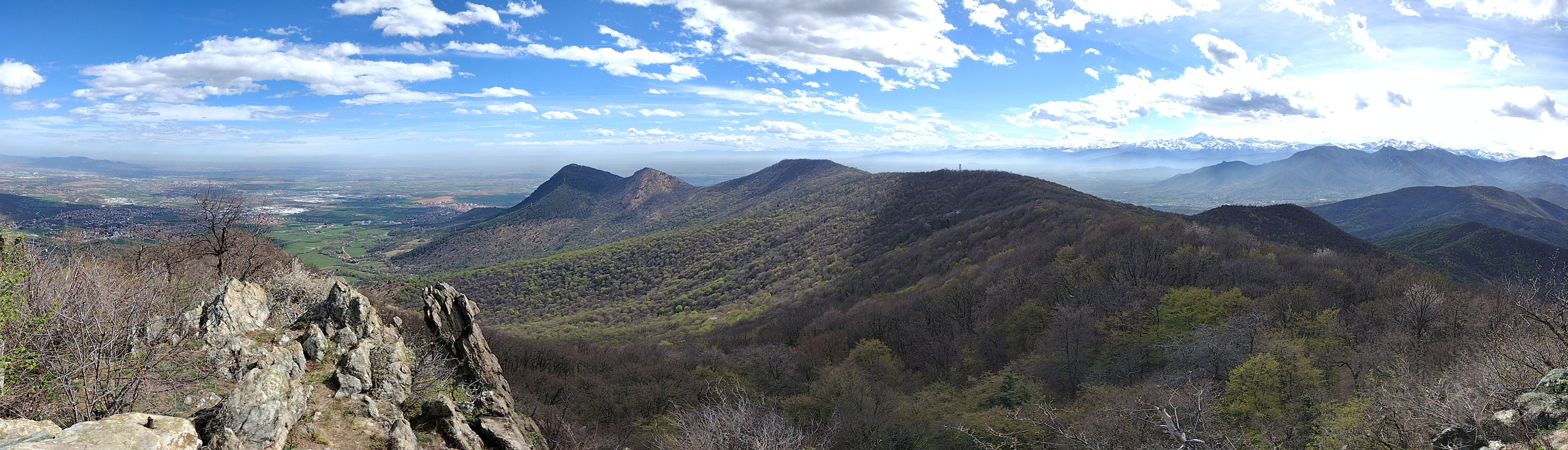
Panorama from the Pietraborga; from left to right Monte San Giorgio, Rôcàs, Montagnazza and, in the distance, the Monviso
