= Montagnazza =

Mountain in Italy

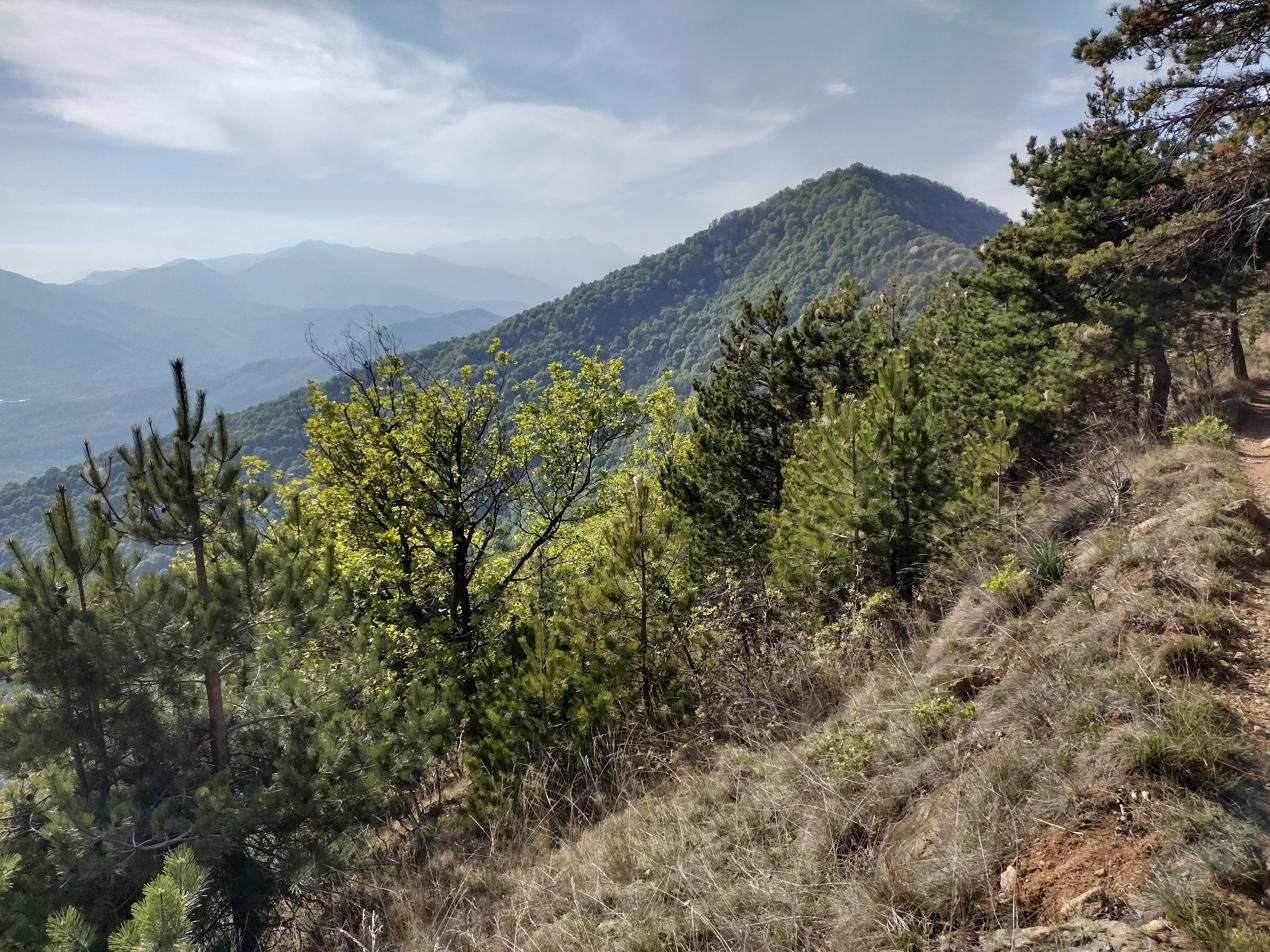
- The mountain as seen from the Rôcàs

Highest point
- Elevation: 892 m (2,927 ft)
- Prominence: 61 m (200 ft)
- Parent peak: Monte Pietraborga
- Coordinates: 45°00′06″N 7°25′41″E

Geography
- Location within Italy
- Location: Piedmont, Italy
- Parent range: Cottian Alps

Climbing
- First ascent: ancestral
- Easiest route: hiking from Campetto (Piossasco)

The Montagnazza (or Montagnassa) is a mountain in the Cottian Alps, Metropolitan City of Turin in Piedmont, north-western Italy. It is located in the comune of Piossasco.

== Features ==
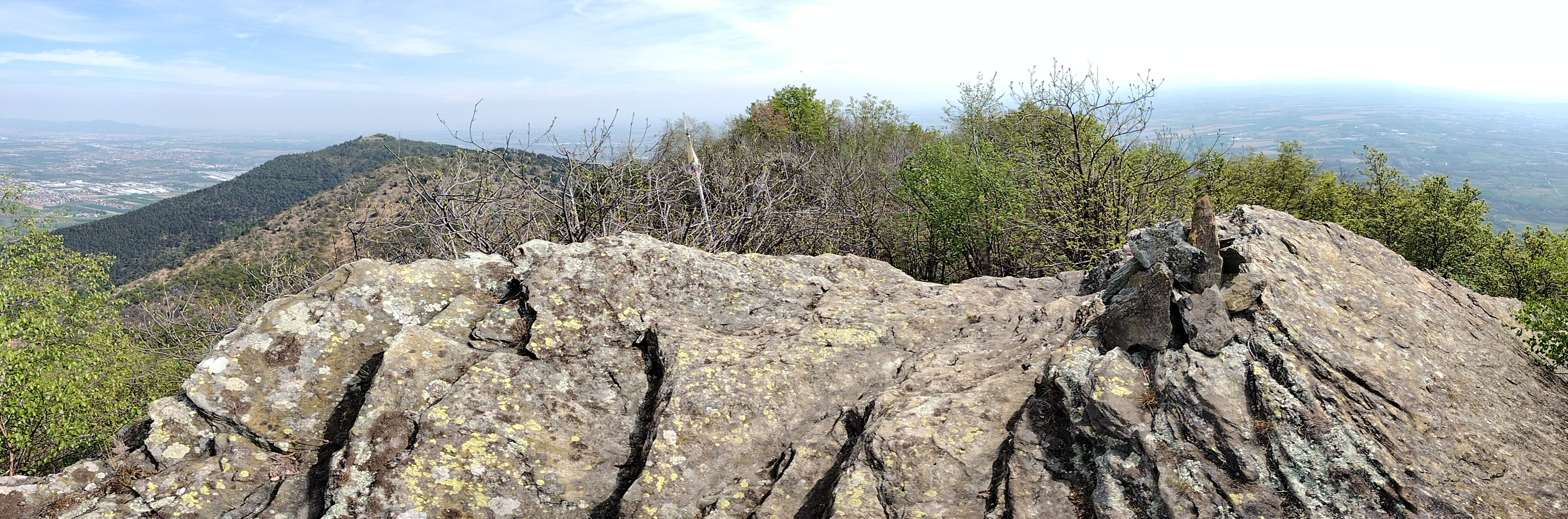
Panorama from the summit

The mountain stands on the water divide between Chisola Valley (South) and a brief valley opened towards the Po plain. Its Western ridge splits after an unnamed elevation at 677 m. One of its branches goes down to Colle di Damone and follows towards Truc le Creste, while the second branch heads to Monte Pietraborga. The South-Eastern ridge of the Montagnazza, after a reaching the Colle di Prè, reaches at first the Rôcàs and later the Monte San Giorgio. Administratively the Montagnazza belongs to the comune of Piossasco. Its summit area is marked by a cairn and, not far from it, by a metal pole. On the Southern slopes of the mountain, at some hundred metres from the summit, stands the Pera Luvera, a massive rock outcrop bearing a votive chapel on its top.

== Geology ==
The Montagnazza is mainly made of ovardite, a peculiar type of prasinite.

== History ==
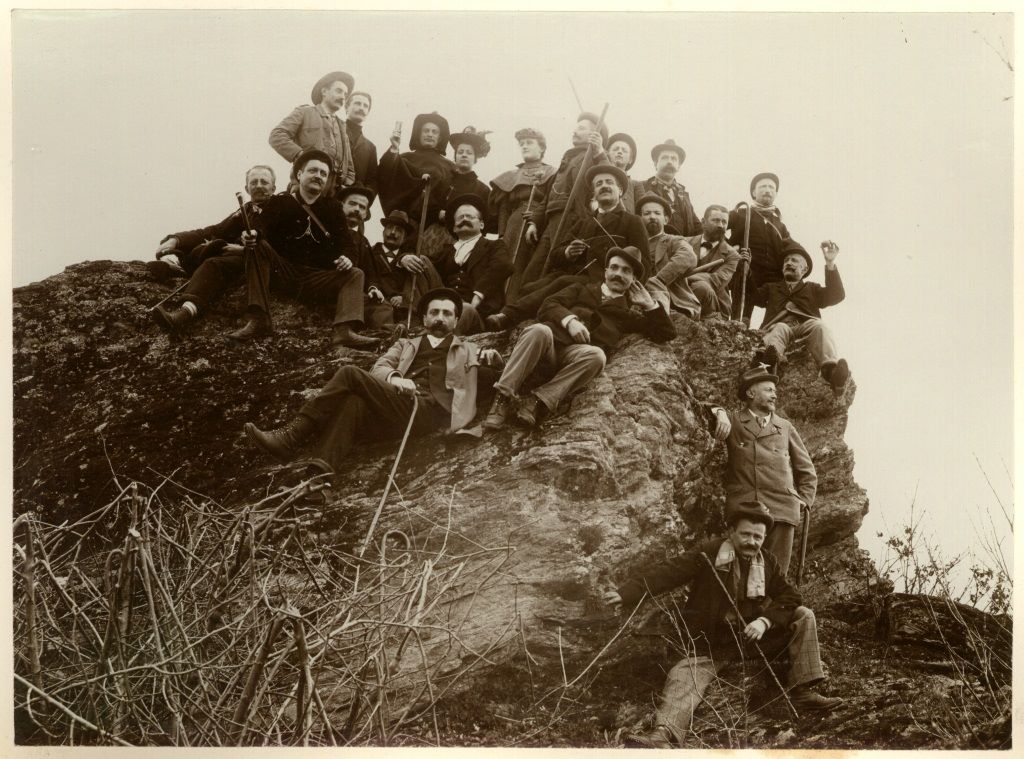
1909: hikers posing on the summit (photo by Mario Gabinio)

At 11:38 a.m. of December the 5th 1987, on a ridge of the Mntagnazza shaded by fog, a fatal plane crash occurred to the "Cessna 172" on which was travelling Pier Cesare Baretti, former director of Tuttosport and soccer manager, who died at the age of 48.

== Access to the summit ==
The summit of the Montagnazza can be accessed on foot without climbing skills. It can be reached starting from the Colletta di Cumiana by a footpath following the Sangone/Chisola water divide or, with a shorter walk, from the village of Campetto (Piossasco).

== Maps ==
- 6 - Pinerolese Val Sangone, 1:25.000 scale, publisher: Fraternali, Ciriè
- 17 - Torino Pinerolo e Bassa Val di Susa, 1:50.000 scale, publisher: IGC - Istituto Geografico Centrale, Torino
