= Favij =

Italian YouTuber

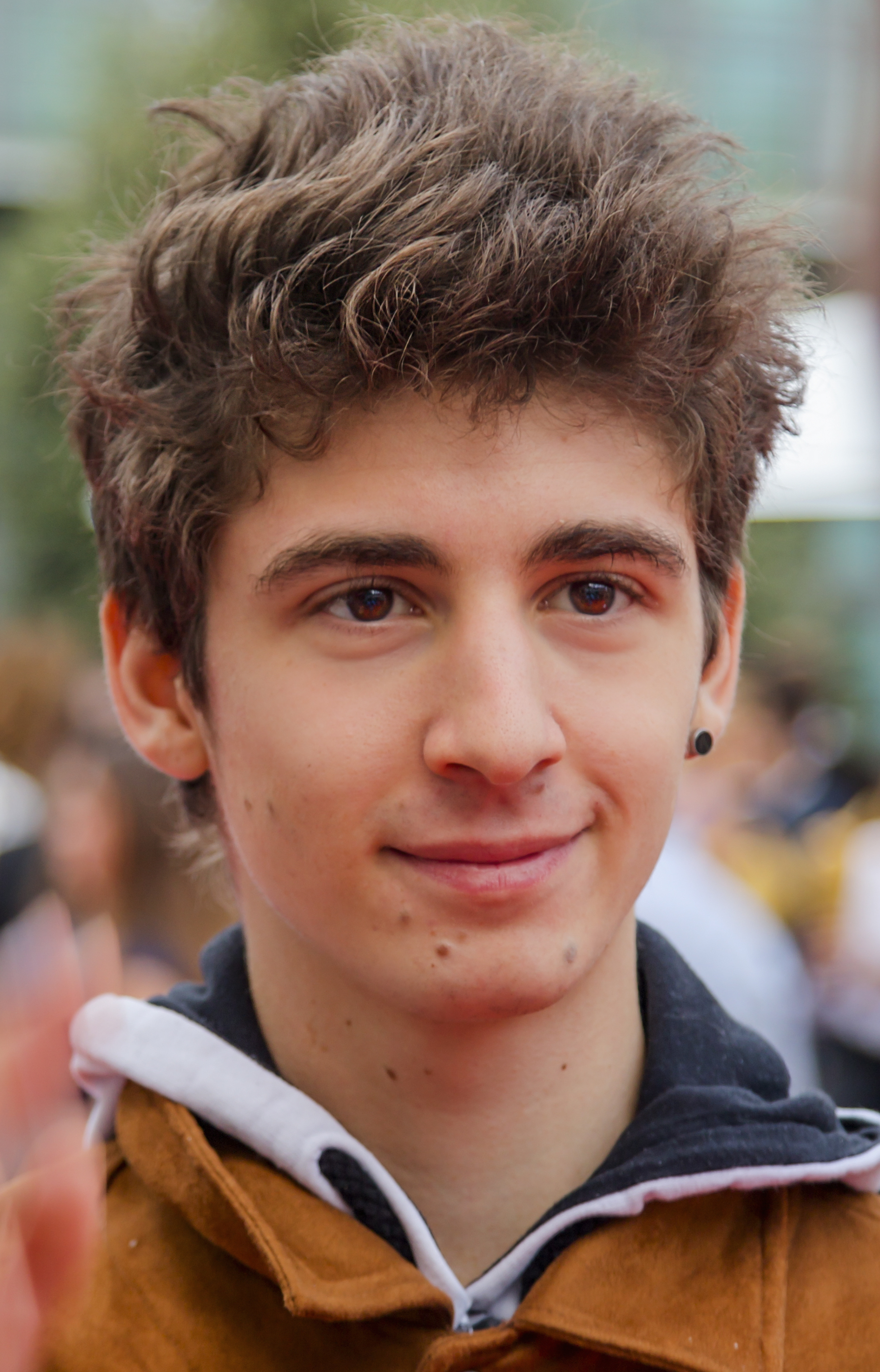
- Ostuni in 2016
- Born: Lorenzo Ostuni; 7 April 1995 (age 31); Mappano, Turin, Italy
- Occupations: YouTuber; actor; writer

YouTube information
- Channel: FavijTV
- Years active: 2007–present
- Genres: Let's Play; vlog
- Subscribers: 6.7 million
- Views: 4.38 billion
- Last updated: 23 April 2026

Lorenzo Ostuni (Italian pronunciation: [loˈrɛntso oˈstuːni]; born 7 April 1995), known online as Favij (Italian pronunciation: [faviˈdʒɛi]) or FavijTV, is an Italian YouTuber. With over six million subscribers and four billion views, Ostuni has been described as one of the most popular YouTubers in Italy.

== Life and career ==
=== Internet career and milestones ===
Ostuni was born in Mappano, Turin, and took a computer course at ITIS Carlo Grassi. In 2007, he created his first YouTube channel called "lory60056", taking inspiration from his real name, Lorenzo. In 2011, he and two friends began a YouTube channel called "TheSharedGaming". Although they typically played first-person shooters, Ostuni did a video playing the indie horror Slender: The Eight Pages (2012).

This video's popularity spurred him to create a solo channel named "FavijTV" on 9 December 2012, with more of a focus on indie games. This channel reached 100,000 subscribers in 2013 and one million subscribers in 2014, the first Italian to cross the milestone. The same year, Ostuni also acted as a correspondent for La Repubblica at BlizzCon, and won the Web Show Awards in the "Gamer" category,

In December 2018, Ostuni reached five million subscribers, becoming the first Italian YouTuber to do so; he also appeared on YouTube Rewind 2018. He created a second channel named "JIVAF" in 2019, which was renamed "LORE". By 2021, his channel was managed by the agency Webstars Channel.

Ostuni is the first professional YouTuber in Italy, as well as the most followed. He lives in Milan. In 2021, Vodafone gave him a new gaming-oriented house to promote their Game Now 5G platform.

=== Other work ===
In 2015, Ostuni made his acting debut in Game Therapy and Mondadori published his first book, an autobiography titled Sotto le cuffie. His second book The Cage was released three years later. Ostuni has also dubbed characters in Disney films such as Ralph Breaks the Internet (2018) and Onward (2020) and was a judge on the 2019 Just Dance: World Cup. He has a line of collectible stickers from Panini Group.

== Internet content ==
Ostuni's content mainly consists of Let's Plays, but he also began creating reaction videos and vlogs. After becoming a professional YouTuber, he has stopped using profanity in his videos. Besides YouTube, Ostuni also has followings on Instagram and Facebook.

== YouTube channels ==
During his time on YouTube, Ostuni has created several channels.

lory60056: His first channel], created in 2007, at the age of 12. In this channel he posted his first ever video, where he showed his home aquarium. The contents of this channel were mainly gameplays of shooting games, videos where he danced to Tektonik music, and random videos, as he said in a video in 2018.

TheSharedGaming (now NiKyBoX): created in 2011 with his two friends NiKyBoX (Nicola) and iPuffo (Luca), where they made gameplay of shooting games like Call of Duty, Skyrim and Battlefield 3.

FavijTV: main channel created in December 2012. The channel has over 6 million subscribers. Its first video is a gameplay of the game Haunt, published on December 18, 2012. Although in the early days it mainly focused on indie games, such as Happy Wheels, Haunt, Penumbra: Overture, Slender: The Eight Pages and others, Ostuni later began publishing vlogs and other types of content. The most popular video on the channel is CROSSBAR CHALLENGE, made in collaboration with the ex-YouTubers group 'i Mates', which has 32 million views.

Favicraft: channel created by Favij in 2011, reserved exclusively for Minecraft gameplays.

LORE (previously JIVAF): secondary Ostuni's channel, created in 2019 under the name "JIVAF", and afterwards changed to "LORE". After the name change Ostuni deleted all the videos he uploaded under the old name and then released the music video for "Anche Meno" on the channel.

Lorenzo Ostuni: personal channel of Favij, created in 2014. Here he publishes very different content from what he brings to other channels, such as covers/remixes of songs and videos of his private life.
