= Sangone (torrent) =

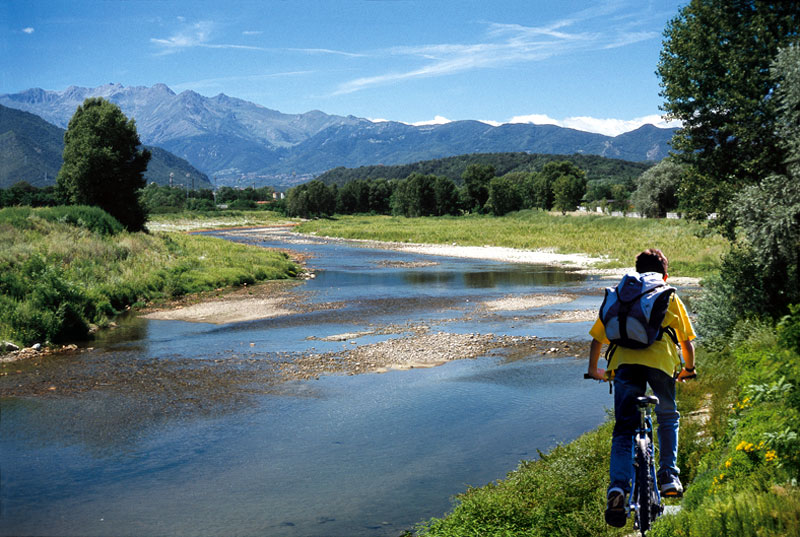

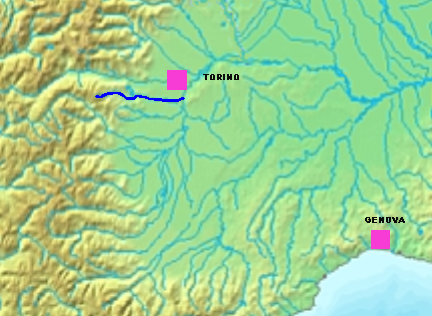
- Location within SW Piedmont

Location
- Country: Italy

Physical characteristics
- Source
  - location: Colle Roussa
  - elevation: 2,017 metres (6,617 ft)
- Mouth
  - location: Po, near Moncalieri
  - coordinates: 45.0188°N 7.6726°E
- Length: 46 kilometres (29 mi)
- Basin size: 3,494 square kilometres (1,349 sq mi)
- Discharge
  - average: 4.6 m^{3}/s (160 cu ft/s)

Basin features
- Progression: Po→ Adriatic Sea

The Sangone is a torrent river in the Metropolitan City of Turin, Piedmont, north-western Italy.

== Geography ==
Starting at some 2000 m above the sea level in the Cottian Alps, it runs through the Val Sangone, between the Val di Susa (north) and the Val Chisone (south). It subsequently flows between the comuni of Coazze and Giaveno, then near Trana, and then enters the plain of Turin. After passing through the territories of Orbassano, Beinasco, Rivalta di Torino and Nichelino among the others, the Sangone enters the Po River between Turin and Moncalieri, at 220 metres (720 ft).

== Nature conservation ==
The upper course of the Sangone is home to some rare species such as the Greyling and the freshwater crayfish Austropotamobius pallipes. Part of the river is included in the inter-communal natural park called Parco Fluviale del Sangone.

== See also ==
- List of national parks in the Alps
