= Viritech Apricale =

Sports car

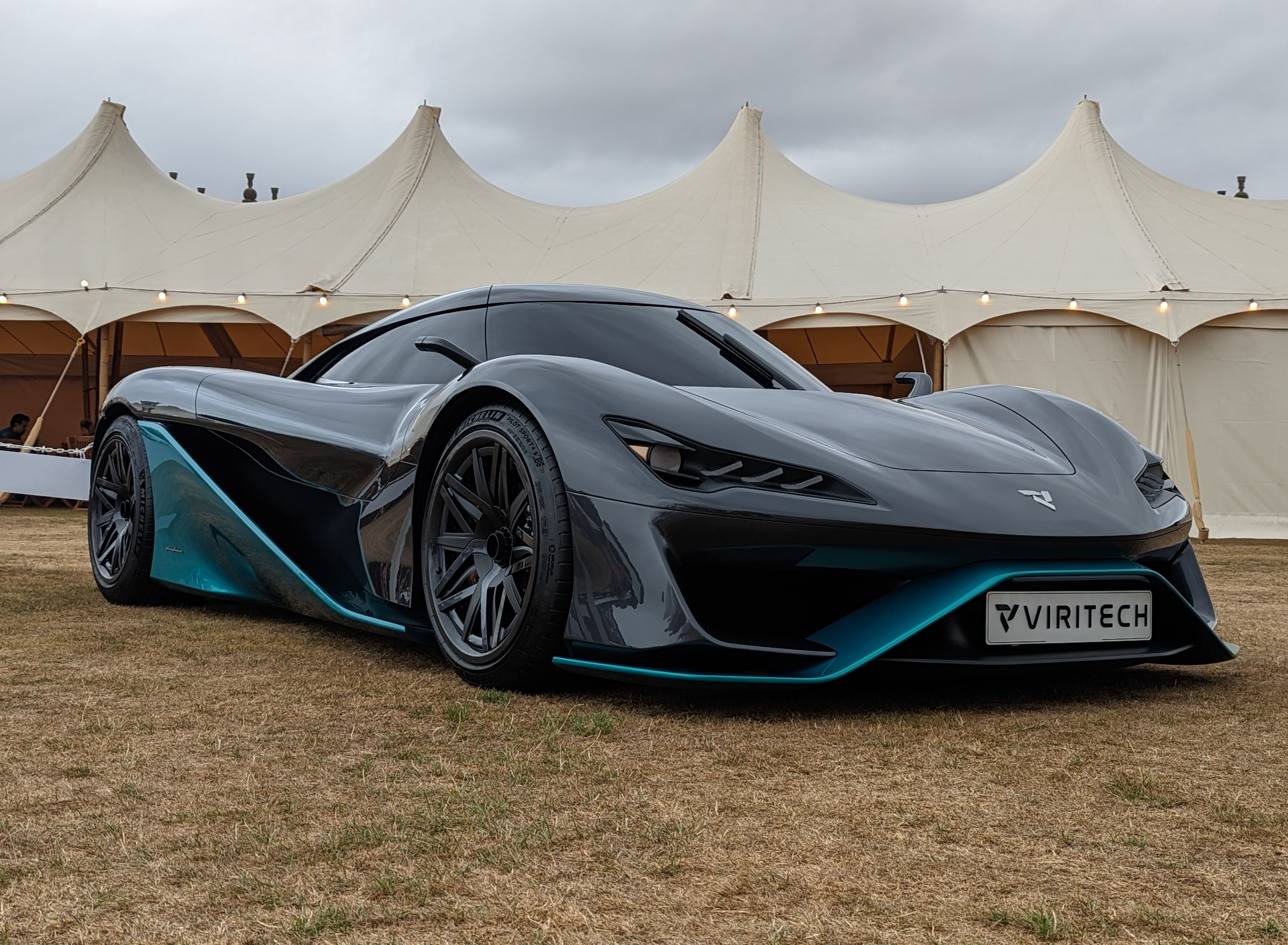

Overview
- Manufacturer: Viritech
- Production: 2024
- Assembly: Italy: Cambiano
- Designer: Pininfarina

Body and chassis
- Class: Sports car (S)
- Body style: 2-door coupé
- Layout: Mid-engine, all-wheel-drive

Powertrain
- Electric motor: 2x permanent magnet motors
- Battery: 6 kWh

Dimensions
- Wheelbase: 2,800 mm (110.2 in)
- Length: 4,550 mm (179.1 in)
- Width: 1,900 mm (74.8 in)
- Height: 1,160 mm (45.7 in)
- Kerb weight: 1,000 kg (2,205 lb)

The Viritech Apricale is a mid-engine hydrogen sports car produced by the British automobile manufacturer Viritech.

== Overview ==
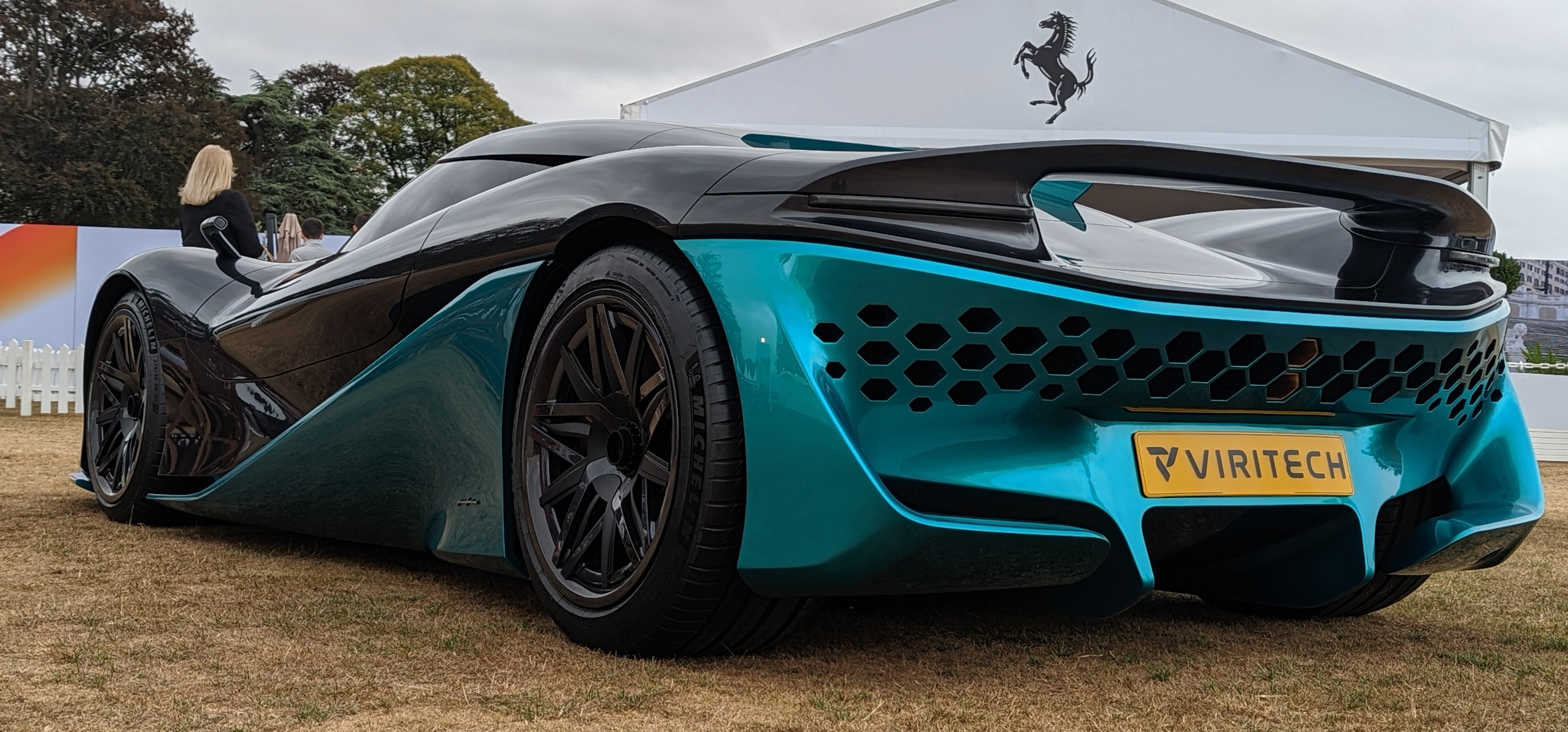
Rear view

A year after the British startup Viritech was founded in 2020, it presented the first information about the planned hydrogen sports car project with a technical specification distinguished by a power exceeding 1,000 hp. Matt Faulks, former head of Tour de Force, which prepares vehicles for races, was engaged to coordinate work on the vehicle. In June 2022, the company presented official information about the Viritech Apricale, whose stylistic design was developed by the Italian design studio Pininfarina.

The aggressive styling combines two-tone tones in the form of a dark gray upper body and light turquoise lower elements around the rear bumper. Both at the front and rear there are large air intakes and aggressively outlined sharp lines. The primary factor taken into account was to obtain the best possible aerodynamic properties. Light components were used to build the Apricale, and the monocoque body structure made of carbon fiber was permanently connected to hydrogen tanks.

When the Apricale was presented in mid-2022, Viritech announced that the car would go into production and sale within the next 2 years. In mid-2023, the company confirmed the conclusion of an agreement with Pininfarina, thanks to which a factory in Cambiano near Turin was designated to produce the hydrogen sports car. A strictly limited, small-series production limited to 25 pieces was planned.

== Specifications ==
The Apricale is a hydrogen-powered car. The choice of a niche and unusual solution was motivated by, among others, the desire to achieve twice the total weight compared to a similarly sized vehicle with a fully electric system, thus not exceeding 1 ton in the case of Apricale. The main drive unit is two electric motors located on each axle, developing a total power of 1,080 HP and 1,000 Nm of maximum torque. This allows the driver to reach 60 mph (97 km/h) in 2.5 seconds and a maximum speed of 200 mph (320 km/h). Viritech designers used their own tri-volt energy management system, which at low speeds uses the electricity stored in a 6 kWh battery. When driving faster, the Apricale uses up to 5.4 kilograms of fuel cells stored in Zbrionics, and when driving on the track, it combines both battery energy and hydrogen.
