= Monastery San Vito =

The monastery San Vito was an Italian cloister of Trappists in Piossasco near Turin from 1875 to 1898.

== History ==
In 1875, the French monastery Lyon-Vaise founded the cloister San Vito in Italia. The noblewoman Julie Astoin, which was born in 1831 in Digne and had lived in Turin, played a special role, because she accepted the religious name Thérèse after the arrival in Lyon-Vaise (1867). The mansion Rabbi near Turin was bought by her in San Vito (today Possiasco) with her financial help and she founded the new monastery (Julie as matron) in 1875. Afterwards, the prioress Thérèse led the cloister until 1898. Then it was moved to Grottaferrata, where another monastery already existed (Santa Maria di Grottaferrata), and in 1957 it was moved to the monastery Vitorchiano.
