= Mappano =

- Comune
- Comune di Mappano
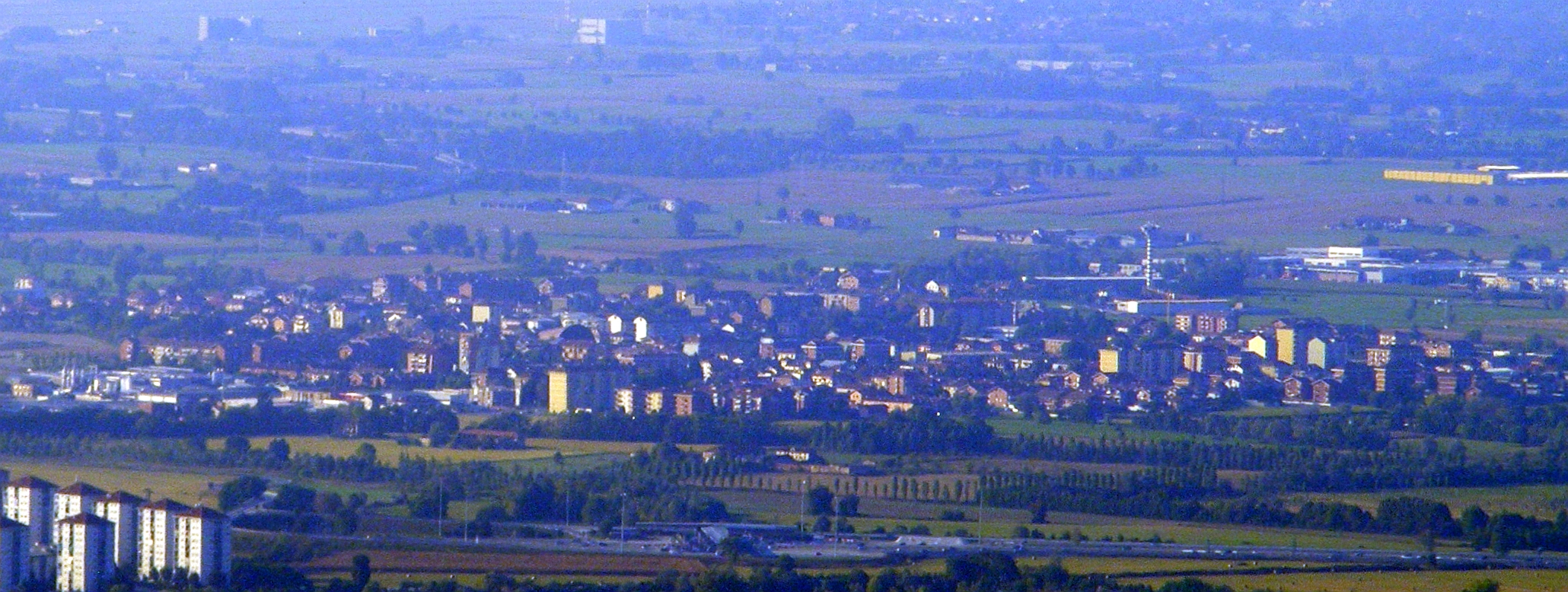

- Location within Italy Location within Piedmont
- Coordinates: 45°8′54″N 7°42′28″E
- Country: Italy
- Region: Piedmont
- Metropolitan city: Turin (TO)

Government
  - Mayor: Francesco Augusto Grassi

Area
  - Total: 9.73 km^{2} (3.76 sq mi)
- Elevation: 235 m (771 ft)

Population (9 October 2011)
  - Total: 7,012
  - Density: 721/km^{2} (1,870/sq mi)
- Demonym: Mappanesi
- Time zone: UTC+1 (CET)
  - Summer (DST): UTC+2 (CEST)
- Postal code: 10079
- Dialing code: 011
- Website: Official website

Mappano (also Mappano Torinese) is a comune (municipality) in the Metropolitan City of Turin in the Italian region Piedmont.

== Geography ==
Mappano is located in the northwestern area of the metropolitan area of Turin, some km in south of Turin-Caelle Airport. The municipality borders with Borgaro Torinese, Caselle Torinese, Leini, Settimo Torinese and Turin.

== History ==
It was established on 30 January 2013, from territories which previously had been frazioni (hamlets) of the communes of Caselle Torinese, Borgaro Torinese, Settimo Torinese and Leini. Permanent settlements in Mappano depicted this area as the swamp of Caselle because of the properties of its soils. In the fifteenth century, Antonio de Amapano (from whom possibly originates the name) began to reclaim the territory, constructing farms in which rice was cultivated. In the sixteenth century, further intervention was undertaken with the creation of a net of irrigation canals. During the nineteenth century, the presence of drainage channels and large open spaces in the area attracted many families of washers, an activity that characterises the suburbs of Turin. The first church in Mappano was built in 1850. The settlement, in that period, consisted of a group of farms scattered along the road between Turin and Leinì that did not expand significantly during the boom after the Second World War. In the 1970s, the Turin metropolitan area experienced a rapid increase in the population in the belt formed by the municipalities of the metropolitan area most distant from the centre of Turin. In a good geographical location, not far from the main city and close to major axes and connection points (the Turin-Milan motorway, the ring motorway, and the airport), the ‘mappanese’ territory developed during the 1980s in a fairly concentrated way around a traditional core.

=== Mappanese identity ===
The term ‘identity’ sometimes criticized for its intrinsic indefinability and ambiguity is important to describe how local political actors identify themselves with a given territory. The struggle for a recognised ‘Mappanese’ identity is stronger than the awareness of the value of environmental resources with which the population lives, in particular the value of the soil resource. Nevertheless, on June 11, 2017, the first mayor of the municipality of Mappano was elected.
