= Borgaro Torinese =

- Comune
- Città di Borgaro Torinese
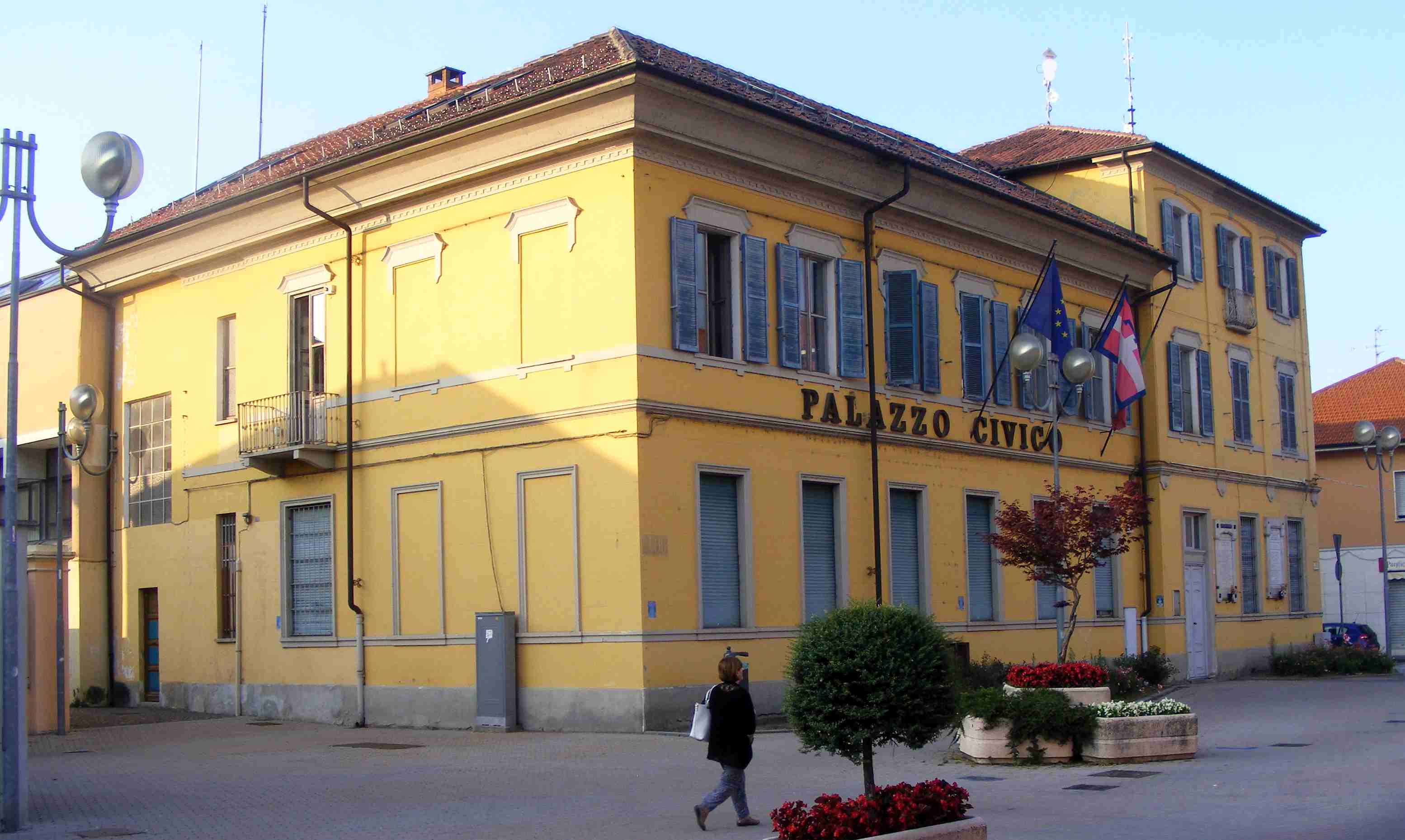
- Town hall

- Coat of arms

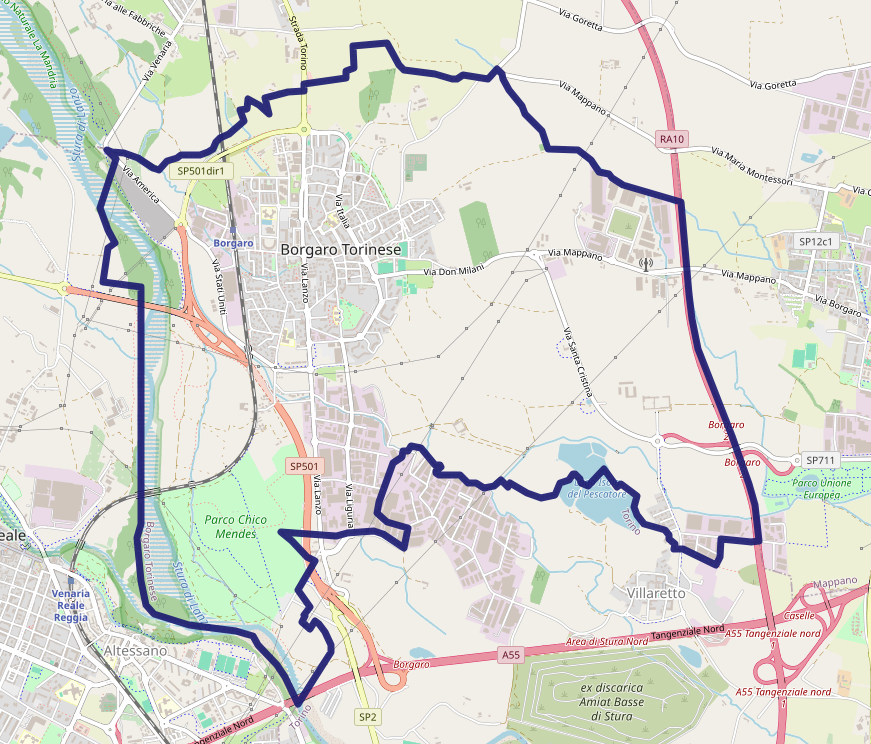

- Location within Italy Location within Piedmont
- Coordinates: 45°9′N 7°39′E
- Country: Italy
- Region: Piedmont
- Metropolitan city: Turin (TO)
- Frazioni: Villaretto

Government
  - Mayor: Claudio Gambino

Area
  - Total: 14.33 km^{2} (5.53 sq mi)

Population (1-1-2017)
  - Total: 13,538
  - Density: 944.7/km^{2} (2,447/sq mi)
- Demonym: Borgarese(i)
- Time zone: UTC+1 (CET)
  - Summer (DST): UTC+2 (CEST)
- Postal code: 10071
- Dialing code: 011
- Website: Official website

Borgaro Torinese is a comune (municipality) in the Metropolitan City of Turin in the Italian region Piedmont, located about 10 kilometres (6 mi) northwest of Turin.

Borgaro Torinese borders the following municipalities: Caselle Torinese, Mappano, Venaria Reale, Settimo Torinese, and Torino.
