= Game Therapy =

2015 Italian-American science fiction film

- Directed by: Ryan Travis
- Written by: Adam Lawson; Giacomo Berdini; Marco Cohen
- Produced by: Marco Cohen; Fabrizio Donvito; Benedetto Habib; Dov Mamann; Luca Casadei; Patrick Oriot
- Starring: Favij; Zoda; Leonardo Decarli; Federico Clapis
- Edited by: Tommaso Gallone
- Production companies: Indiana Production; Web Stars Channel; Pulse Films
- Distributed by: Key Films
- Release date: 22 October 2015 (Italy)
- Running time: 97 minutes
- Countries: Italy; United States
- Languages: Italian; English
- Budget: €2,000,000
- Box office: €1,341,185

Game Therapy is a 2015 Italian-American science-fiction film directed by Ryan Travis. The film features various Italian YouTubers, including Favij.

The film was released in theaters in Italy on 22 October 2015.

== Plot ==
Game developer Holden Latter wants a virtual world where anything is possible, and a player can find anything he searches for. Francesco, an 18-year-old hacker, is bullied in school, and has a troubled personal life. Francesco's friend Giovanni is addicted to video games, which his brother Federico attempts to help him control.

One day, Francesco finds an easter egg in a game created by Holden. Francesco hacks the game and finds coordinates which take him under the subway, where he finds a device which can transfer a person's consciousness into a video game via brain connection. Each level depicts various games such as Assassin's Creed, Just Dance and Grand Theft Auto V. Francesco has full control and can make anything appear in the game.

The next day, Francesco starts the "Game Therapy" with Giovanni, who enters Assassin's Creed, while Francesco follows him outside the virtual world via computer. Giovanni learns how to control his own avatar, who can push himself through the limits of human race. Francesco further trains Giovanni by sending him into Call of Duty, where he gets injured. After he gets out from the device, Francesco and Giovanni start making appointments for their Game Therapy.

While continuing to participate in Game Therapy, Giovanni starts a relationship with Danika. In the Uncharted level, Giovanni and Francesco discover the Spectrum, an unknown entity. Giovanni's life is threatened when the Spectrum traps him inside a cube, but Francesco helps him to escape. Francesco reveals to Giovanni that his true intention is to find the key to the Multiverse, where the player has total control of the world and can get away from real life altogether. Giovanni is almost killed trying to get the key, and Francesco is forced to disconnect him from the device.

Giovanni is forced to choose between Danika and the Game Therapy. Francesco creates a multiplayer mode to recover the key. Francesco and Giovanni arrive at the Battlefield level, where they face the Spectrum. They also discover that Latter programmed the coordinates as part of the easter egg so that someone would find the device, and subsequently, the key. After the battle, they get transported into the Master Console, where the game codes and data are stored. Holden stabs Giovanni and fights Francesco, but Giovanni frees himself and launches a device that sucks Holden's source code. Before disappearing, Holden launches a dagger at Giovanni, which kills him and sends him back to the real world. Francesco decides to remain inside the game, and opens the Master Console with the key, becoming Master Gamer. Francesco's actions save the Multiverse, which turns off and goes haywire. However, he will no longer be able to return to the real world, and he will turn into code if he gets disconnected from the device. In the real world, Giovanni manages to pass school tests, reconnects with his brother, and gets back together with Danika.

== Cast ==
- Federico Clapis as Giovanni
- Favij as Francesco
- Leonardo Decarli as Federico
- Zoda as Gianfilippo
- Elisa Piazza as Danika
- Riccardo Cicogna as Holden Latter

== Production ==
The film was shot in 2015 between Italy, Morocco and Los Angeles.

== Promotion ==
The first teaser trailer was released on 3 July 2015. The official trailer came out on 28 August 2015.

== Release ==
The film premiered on 21 October 2015 at the Rome Film Festival. At the premiere many Italian YouTubers participated. The film was then released on 22 October 2015 and distributed by Key Films.

== Reception ==
=== Box office ===
The film earned €740 thousand, placing fifth.

=== Critical response ===
The film has received negative options from Italian critic. Gabriele Niola of MyMovies wrote: "A formidable idea and potentially exciting becomes a retroguardist film and with a plot full of holes".

Giorgio Viario of Best Movie wrote that:

The film has an explicit educational intent, but in reality the center of interest is linguistic: in the sense that Favij and Clapis speak a language that is never heard in cinema and on TV; they build a bridge with the Internet and above all with the world of gamers, more generally with the generation of children aged 12 to 16. Unfortunately the film rarely allows this space, and in fact makes the most banal mistake: that of closing them inside a message and a narrative box, both rigid and lopsided.

Antonio Cuomo of Movieplayer wrote:

However, we don't want to be snobbish and mistreat Game Therapy on principle, because we are gamers too and we would have liked the idea behind the film to be better developed, doing justice to the world it accompanies. But if it is presented to us as a film, if it arrives in theaters (in about three hundred theaters, among other things), we cannot fail to notice the banality of the script and its construction, the quality of the costumes that disfigures compared to some cosplayers seen in I go around specialized fairs, the acting is insufficient, the average level is that of a webseries that is not particularly inspired. Because that's the feeling it gives.

Davide Turrini of Il Fatto Quotidiano wrote that: "it was enough to scroll through a few sequences to understand that Game Therapy is related to any of the cinepanettoni of the nineties/early 2000s who wanted to entertain the viewer at all costs despite the tired repetition of the successful original matrix".

=== Accolades ===
The film was nominated for the David di Donatello award for Best Visual Effects.
