= Monte San Giorgio (Cottian Alps) =

Mountain in Italy

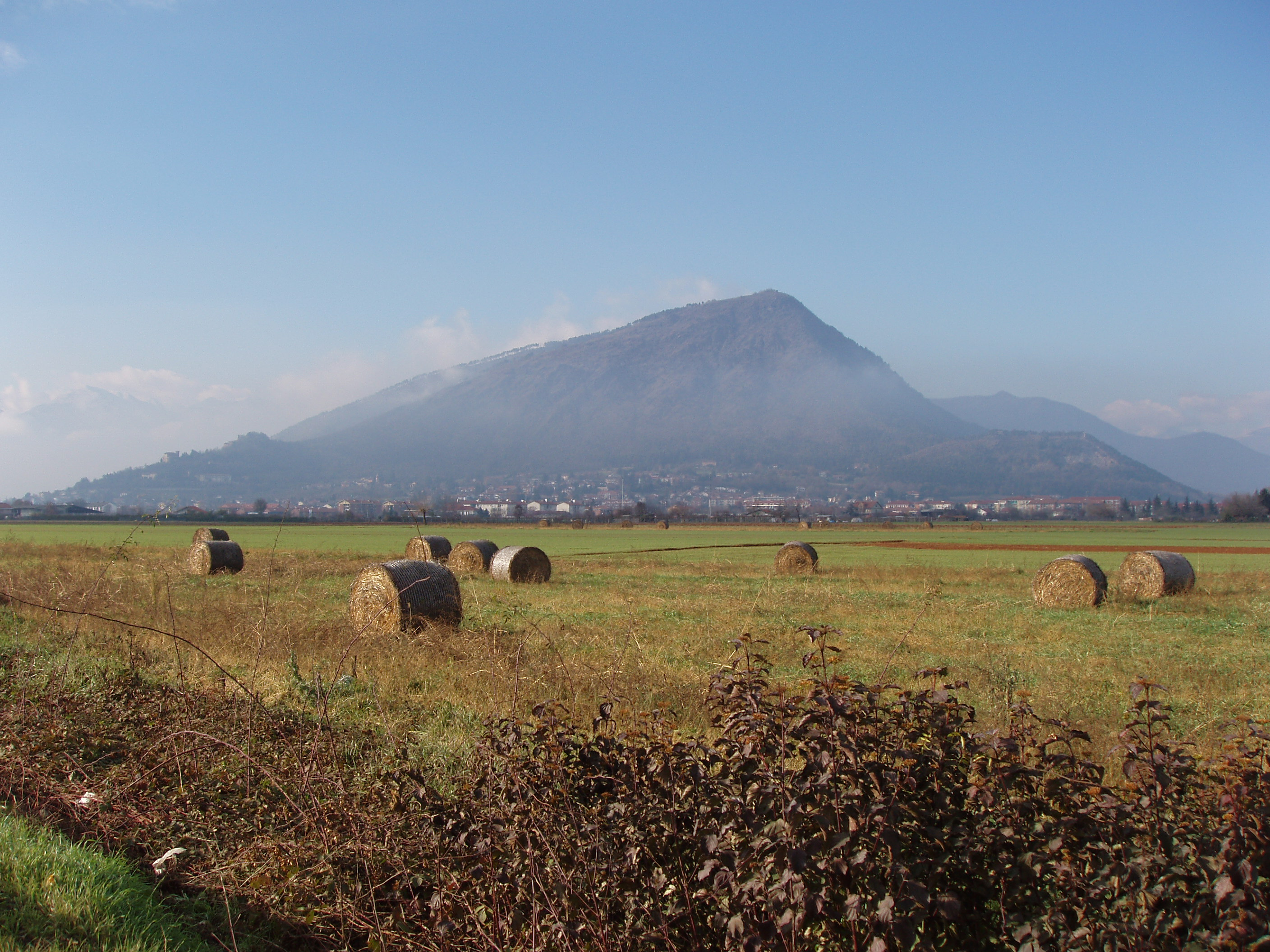
- The mountain as seen from the plain

Highest point
- Elevation: 837 m (2,746 ft)
- Prominence: 124 m (407 ft)
- Isolation: 0.37 km (0.23 mi)
- Coordinates: 44°59′50″N 7°26′52″E

Geography
- Location within Italy
- Location: Piedmont, Italy
- Parent range: Cottian Alps

Climbing
- First ascent: ancestral
- Easiest route: hiking from Piossasco

The Monte San Giorgio is a mountain in the Cottian Alps, Metropolitan City of Turin in Piedmont, north-western Italy. It is located in the comune of Piossasco.

== Features ==
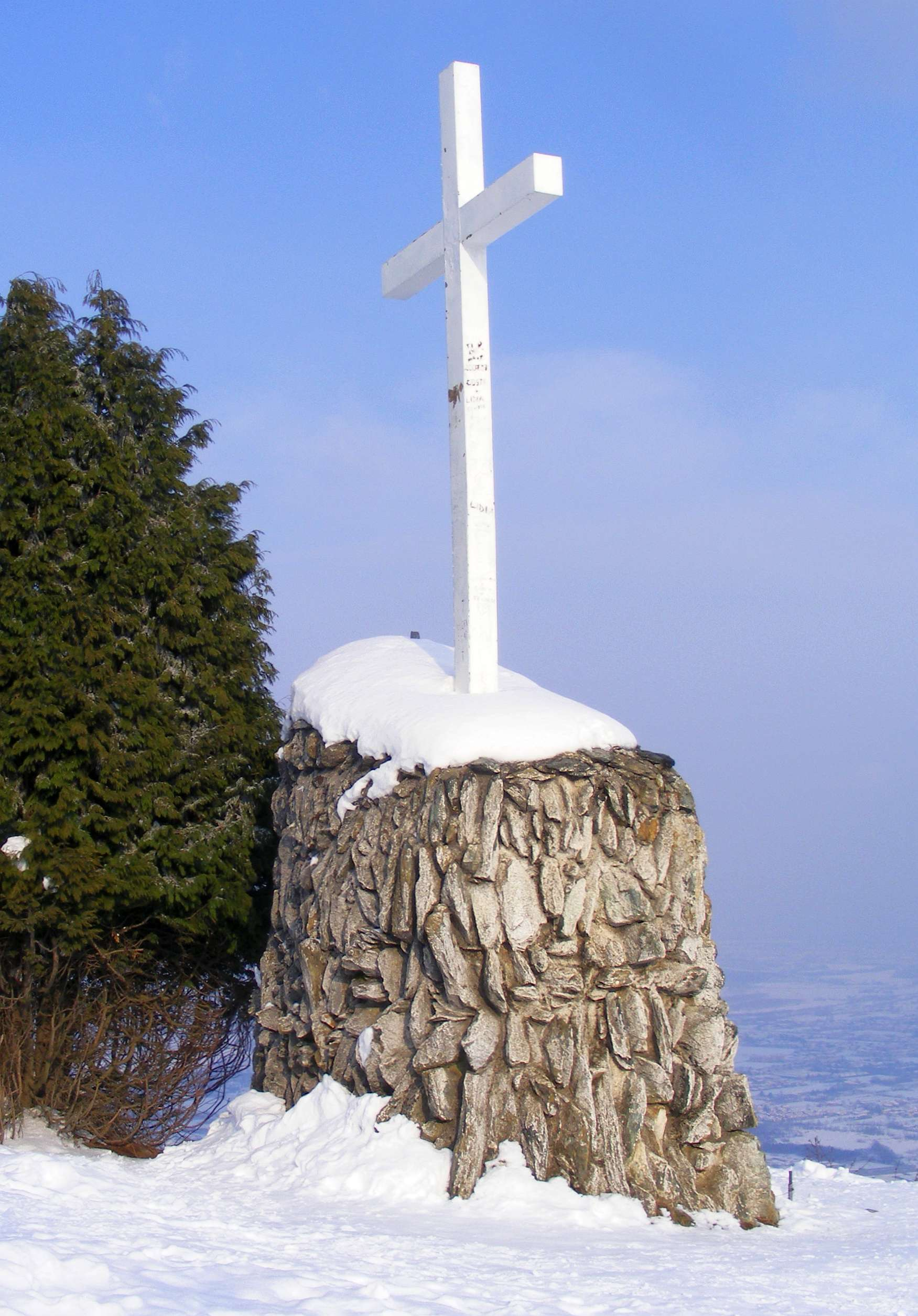
Summit cross

The mountain overlooks the centre of Piossasco and belongs to the North flank of the Chisola valley. On its summit three ridges meet: the Eastern one goes down to the saddle Colle della Serva, then regains elevation with the Rôcàs (825 m) and connects the mountain with the Montagnazza and the rest of the Alpine chain; the brief North and South ridges divide the flat area where the centre of Piosasco lies from the Chisola valley (South) and from the short valley drained by a stream named Bealera di Piossasco. On the summit of Monte San Giorgio stands a tall summit cross, a small shelter devoted to the memory of Lorenzo Nicola, an Italian officer who died in Russia in 1943 and awarded with the Gold Medal of Military Valour, and the Saint George's Middle Ages church.

== Geology ==
The rocks which form the mountain belong to the Ultrabasic Lanzo massif, a geologic formation of an extremely deep origin. Its prevailing rocks are peridotites, very rich in magnesium and which strongly influence the soil chemistry of the area, and thus its vegetation.

== Access to the summit ==
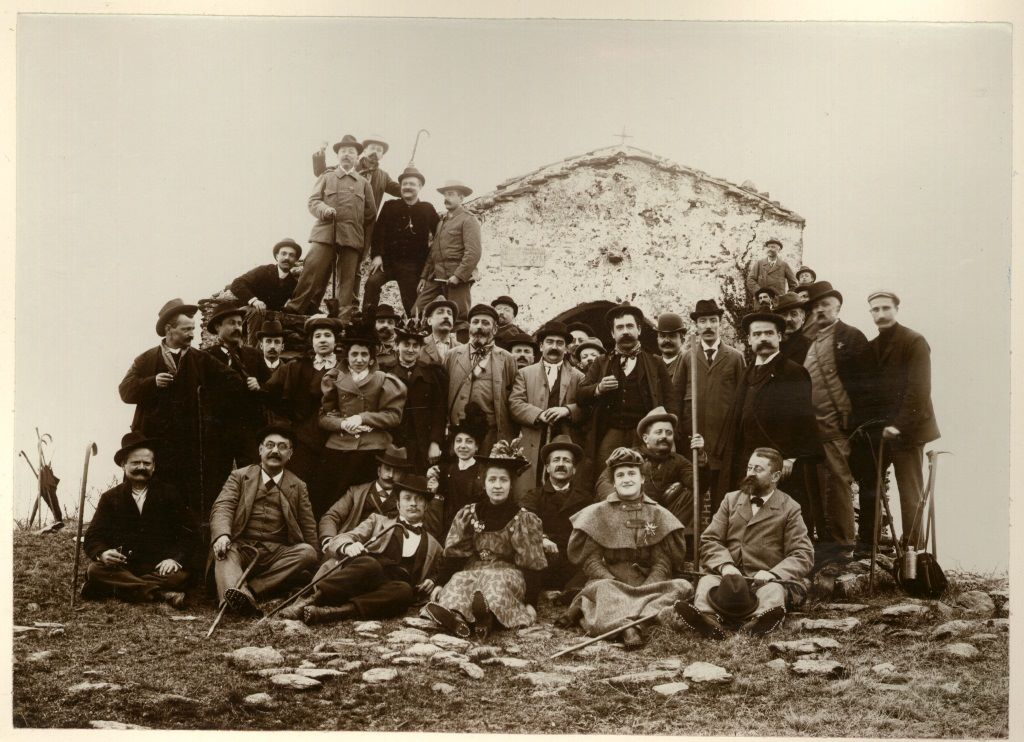
1909: a group of hikers on the mountain summit

=== Pedestrian access ===
The shortest hiking way to attain the mountain is the footpath which starts from "Tre castelli" (Piossasco) and, after crossing a place named "Croce dei Castelli" (450 m), reaches the summit through its sunny South ridge. Another footpath connects Piossasco with Monte San Giorgio through the small church of San Valeriano, and can be used on the way back in order to form an hiking loop. Other hiking itineraries cross the mountain; among them the David Bertrand footpath, devoted to the memory of a young volunteer fireman fallen on duty during a wood-fire.

=== Mountain bike ===
By mountain bike, also starting from Piossasco, the summit can be reached following a dirt road which passes close to the small church of San Valeriano and, after crossing the NE slopes of the mountain, reaches its summit the colle della Serva (728 m) and, after some hairpins, the summit of Monte San Giorgio.

=== Winter access ===
During snowy winters the summit can be reached with snow shoes

== Maps ==
- 6 - Pinerolese Val Sangone, 1:25.000 scale, publisher: Fraternali, Ciriè
- 17 - Torino Pinerolo e Bassa Val di Susa, 1:50.000 scale, publisher: IGC - Istituto Geografico Centrale, Torino
