= Pino Torinese =

- Comune
- Comune di Pino Torinese
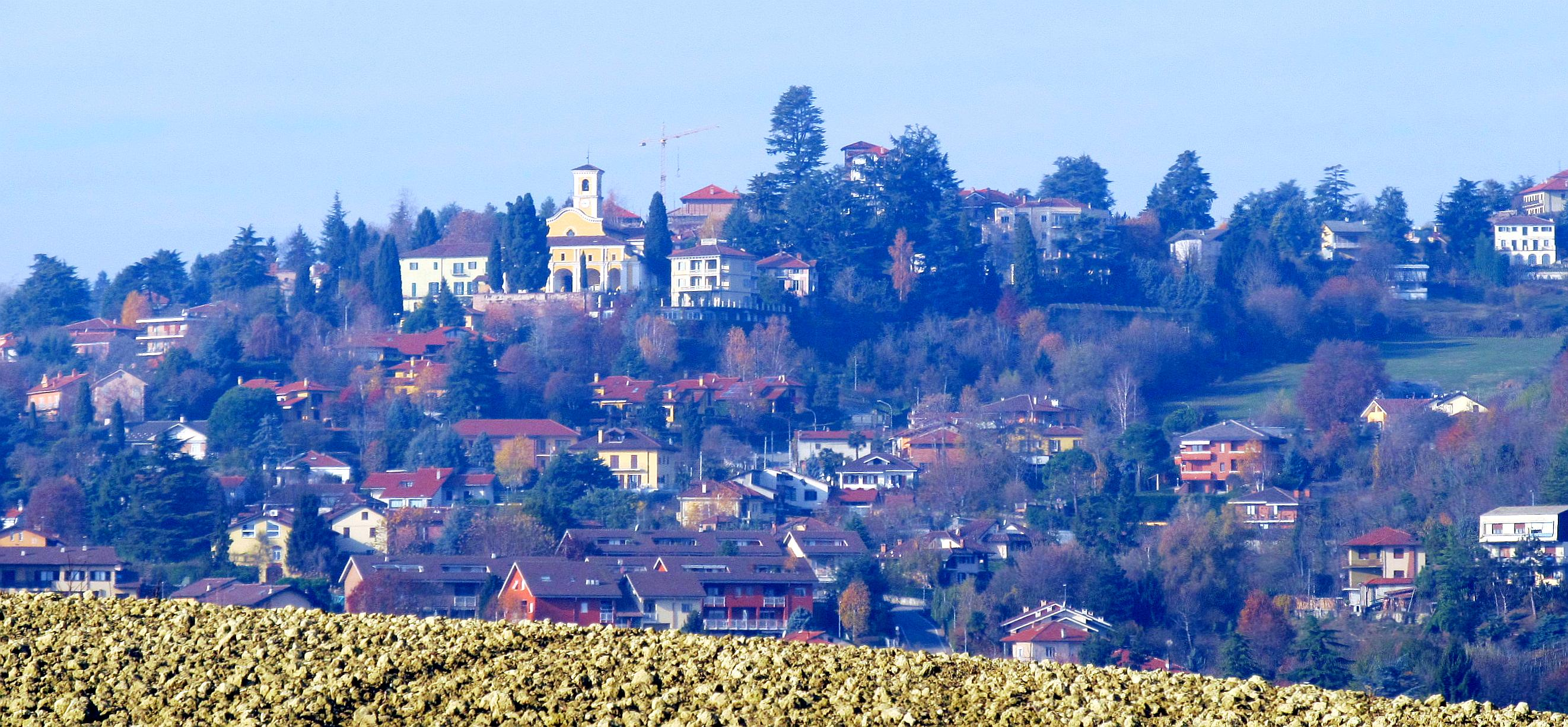

- Coat of arms

- Location within Italy Location within Piedmont
- Coordinates: 45°2′36.56″N 7°46′21.20″E
- Country: Italy
- Region: Piedmont
- Metropolitan city: Turin (TO)
- Frazioni: La Roglia, Monte Aman, San Felice, Tepice-Palazzotto, Tetti Civera, Tetti Gariglio, Tetti Miglioretti, Tetti Paletti, Tetti Ravotto, Valle Ceppi

Government
  - Mayor: Alessandra Tosi

Area
  - Total: 21.82 km^{2} (8.42 sq mi)
- Elevation: 550 m (1,800 ft)

Population (1 January 2021)
  - Total: 8,378
  - Density: 384.0/km^{2} (994.5/sq mi)
- Demonym: Pinese(i)
- Time zone: UTC+1 (CET)
  - Summer (DST): UTC+2 (CEST)
- Postal code: 10025
- Dialing code: 011
- Patron saint: St. Andrew
- Website: Official website

Pino Torinese is a comune (municipality) in the Metropolitan City of Turin in the Italian region Piedmont, located about 6 kilometres (4 mi) southeast of Turin.

Pino Torinese borders the following municipalities: Turin, Baldissero Torinese, Chieri, Pecetto Torinese, and Cambiano.

It is the site of the Observatory of Turin, founded in 1759.

The Associazione Cultura Giapponese di Torino had its offices in Pino Torinese. It operates a Japanese weekend school.
