= Piossasco =

- Comune
- Comune di Piossasco
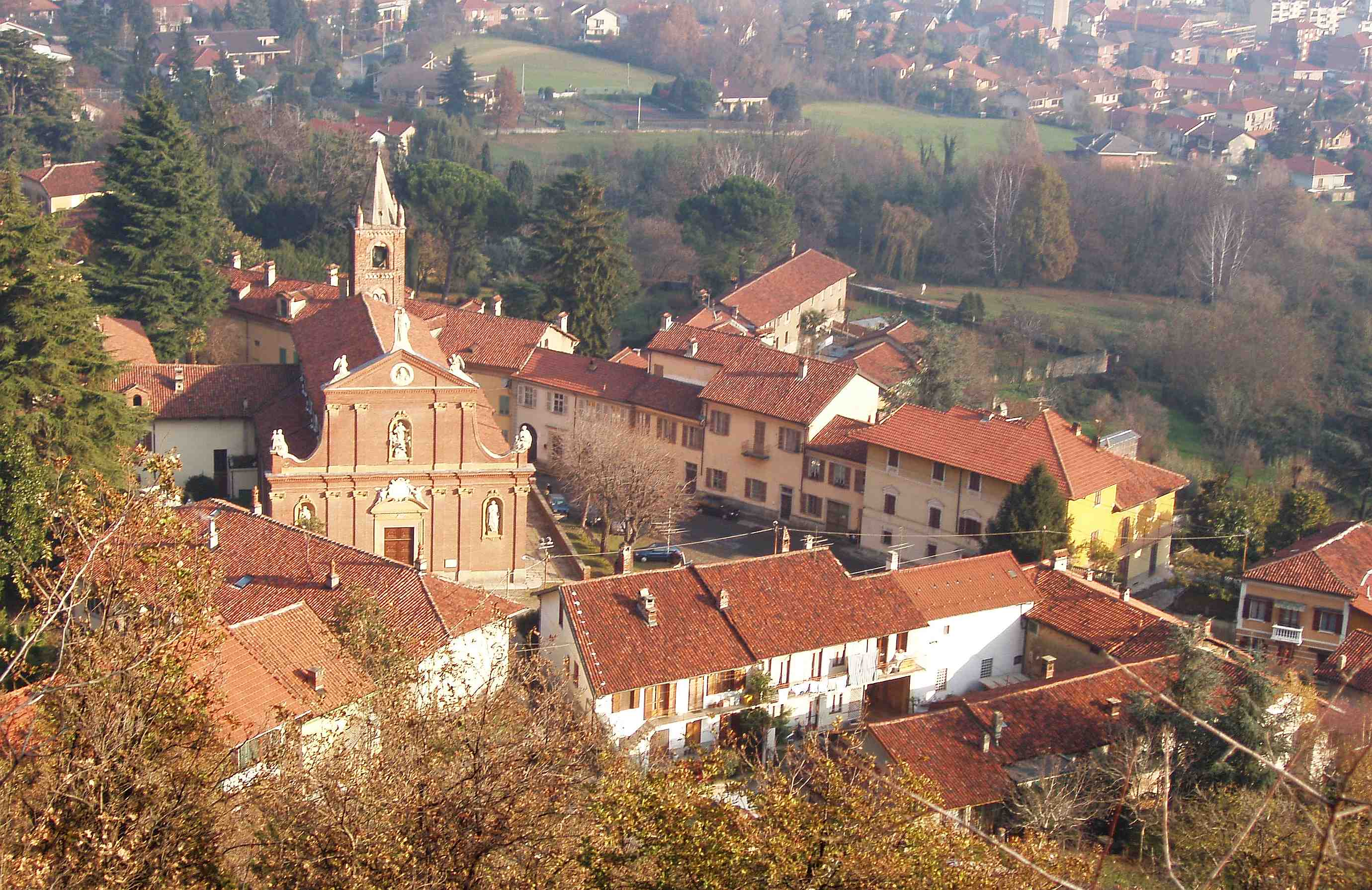

- Coat of arms

- Location within Italy Location within Piedmont
- Coordinates: 44°59′N 7°28′E
- Country: Italy
- Region: Piedmont
- Metropolitan city: Turin (TO)
- Frazioni: I Galli, San Vito, Garola, Tetti Scaglia, Duis, Abate, Brentatori, Colomba, Lupi, Barboschi, Villaggio Nuovo, Giorda, Maritani, Mompalà, Tetti Olli, Campetto, Rivetta, Generala, Prese, Ciampetto, Gaj, Merlino.

Government
  - Mayor: Pasquale Giuliano

Area
  - Total: 40.0 km^{2} (15.4 sq mi)
- Elevation: 304 m (997 ft)

Population (1 January 2014)
  - Total: 18,412
  - Density: 460/km^{2} (1,190/sq mi)
- Demonym: Piossaschesi
- Time zone: UTC+1 (CET)
  - Summer (DST): UTC+2 (CEST)
- Postal code: 10045
- Dialing code: 011
- Website: Official website

Piossasco is a comune (municipality) in the Metropolitan City of Turin in the Italian region Piedmont, located about 20 km southwest of Turin at the foot of the Monte San Giorgio.

Piossasco borders the following municipalities: Trana, Rivalta di Torino, Sangano, Bruino, Cumiana, and Volvera.

== Twin towns ==
- Cran-Gevrier, France, since 1991
