= Pecetto Torinese =

- Comune
- Comune di Pecetto Torinese
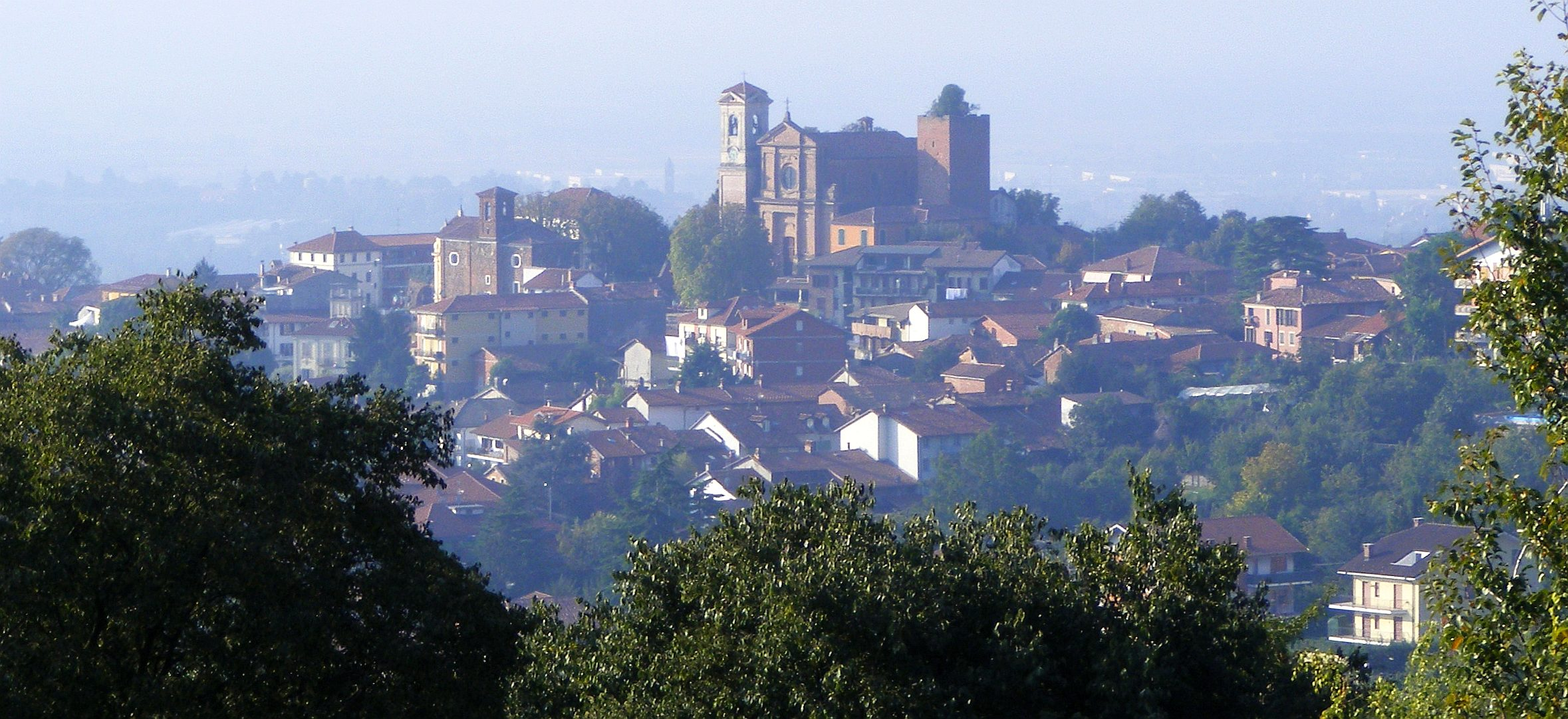

- Coat of arms

- Location within Italy Location within Piedmont
- Coordinates: 45°1′N 7°45′E
- Country: Italy
- Region: Piedmont
- Metropolitan city: Turin (TO)

Government
  - Mayor: Adriano Pizzo

Area
  - Total: 9.2 km^{2} (3.6 sq mi)
- Elevation: 407 m (1,335 ft)

Population (30 November 2014)
  - Total: 3,981
  - Density: 430/km^{2} (1,100/sq mi)
- Demonym: Pecettesi
- Time zone: UTC+1 (CET)
  - Summer (DST): UTC+2 (CEST)
- Postal code: 10020
- Dialing code: 011

Pecetto Torinese is a comune (municipality) in the Metropolitan City of Turin in the Italian region Piedmont, located about 7 kilometres (4 mi) southeast of Turin.

Pecetto Torinese borders the following municipalities: Turin, Pino Torinese, Chieri, Moncalieri, Cambiano, and Trofarello. It is renowned for the production of Cherries.
