= Trofarello =

- Comune
- Comune di Trofarello
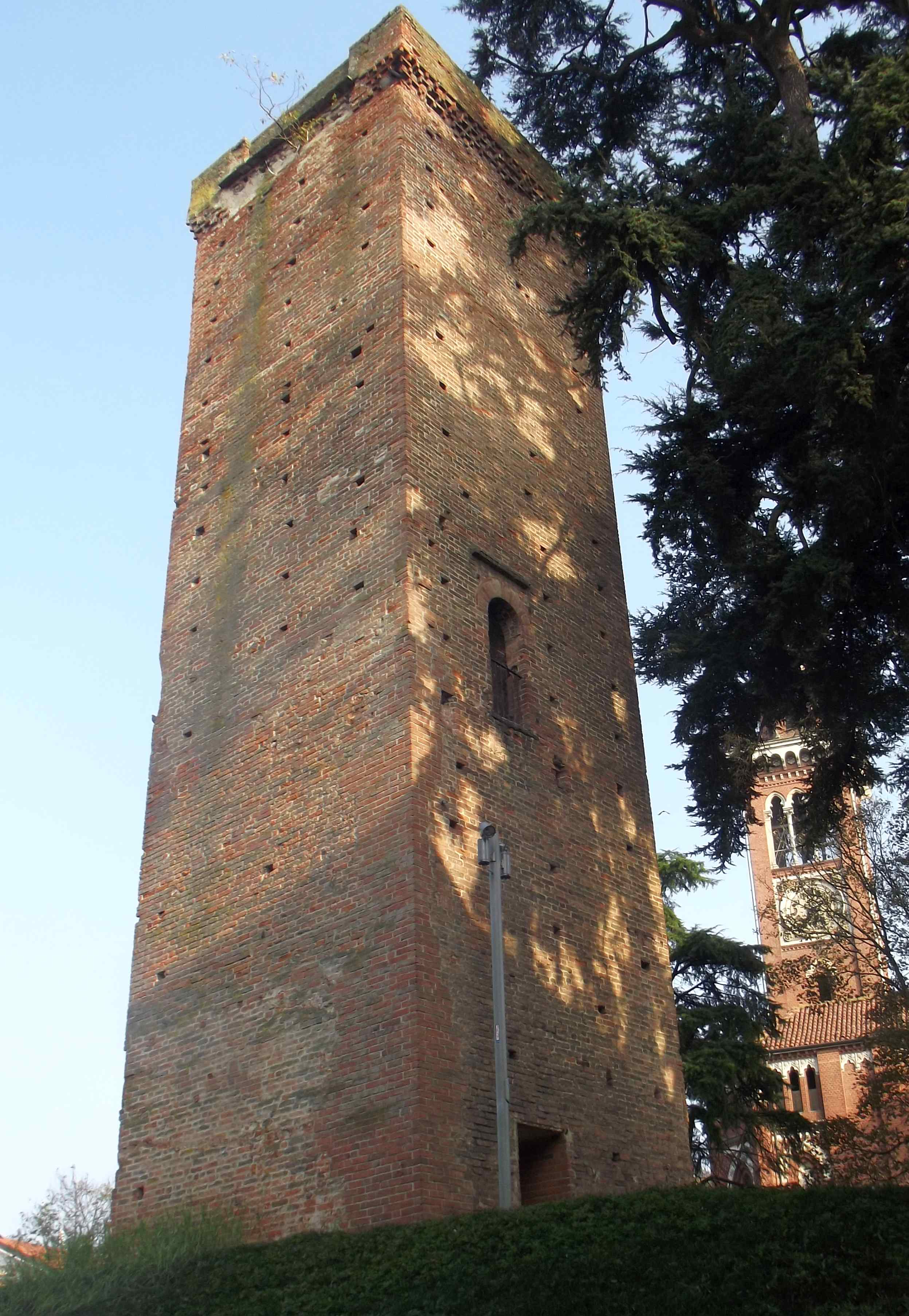
- Civic tower.

- Coat of arms

- Location within Italy Location within Piedmont
- Coordinates: 44°59′N 7°44′E
- Country: Italy
- Region: Piedmont
- Metropolitan city: Turin (TO)
- Frazioni: Valle Sauglio, Rivera

Government
  - Mayor: Gian Franco Visca

Area
  - Total: 12.3 km^{2} (4.7 sq mi)
- Elevation: 300 m (980 ft)

Population (31 January 2011)
  - Total: 11,016
  - Density: 896/km^{2} (2,320/sq mi)
- Demonym: Trofarellesi
- Time zone: UTC+1 (CET)
  - Summer (DST): UTC+2 (CEST)
- Postal code: 10028
- Dialing code: 011
- Website: Official website

Trofarello is a comune (municipality) in the Metropolitan City of Turin in the Italian region Piedmont, located about 10 kilometres (6 mi) southeast of Turin.

Trofarello borders the following municipalities: Pecetto Torinese, Moncalieri, Cambiano, and Santena.

== Twin towns – sister cities ==
Trofarello is twinned with:

- Le Teil, France (1972)
- Raunheim, Germany (1986)
