= Santena =

- Comune
- Comune di Santena
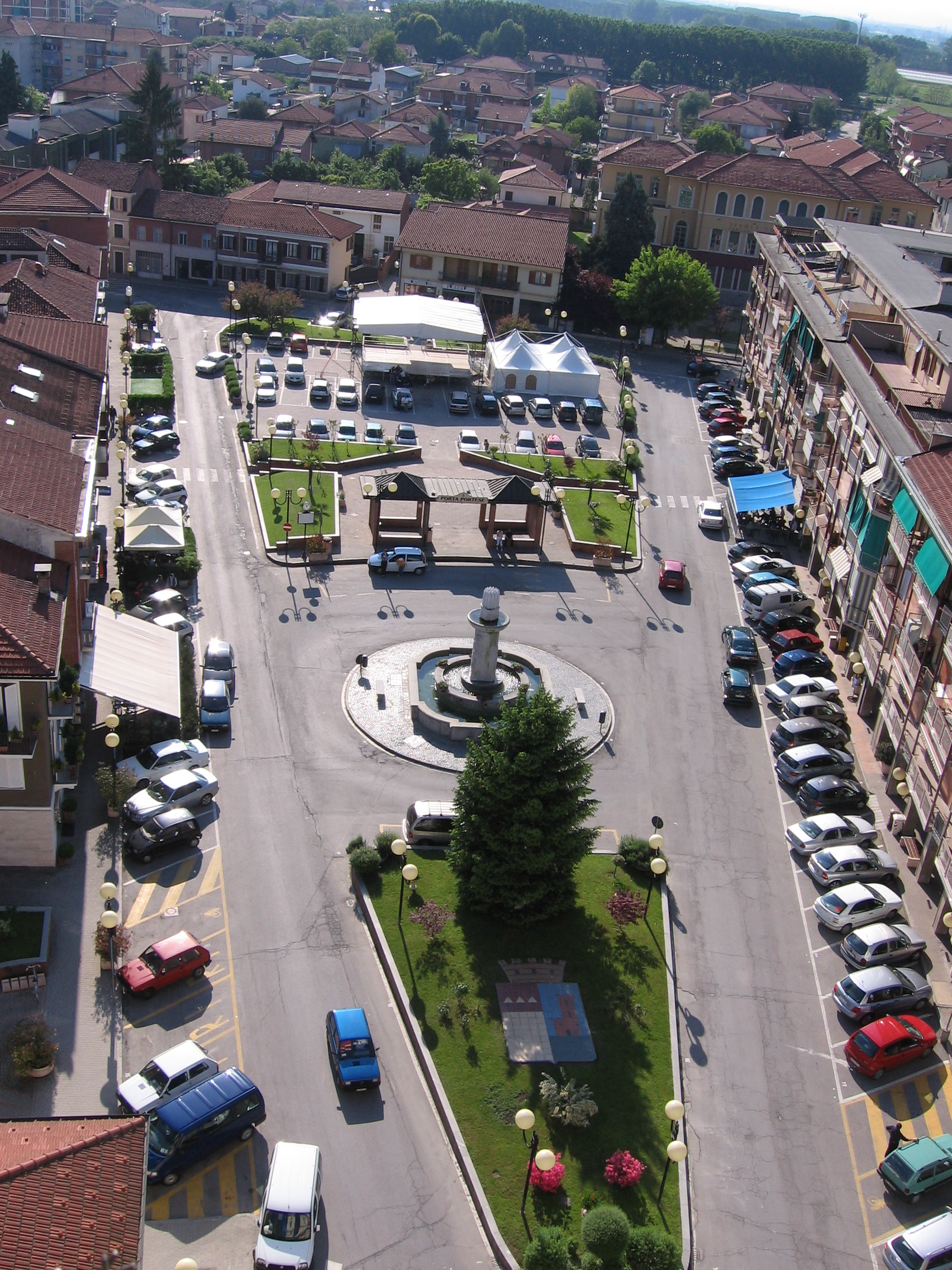

- Coat of arms

- Location within Italy Location within Piedmont
- Coordinates: 44°57′N 7°47′E
- Country: Italy
- Region: Piedmont
- Metropolitan city: Turin (TO)
- Frazioni: Alberassa, Carolina, Case Nuove, Gamenario, Luserna, San Salvà, Tetti Agostino, Tetti Busso, Tetti Giro

Government
  - Mayor: Roberto Ghio

Area
  - Total: 16.20 km^{2} (6.25 sq mi)
- Elevation: 237 m (778 ft)

Population (1 January 2024)
  - Total: 10,480
  - Density: 646.9/km^{2} (1,675/sq mi)
- Demonym: Santenese(i)
- Time zone: UTC+1 (CET)
  - Summer (DST): UTC+2 (CEST)
- Postal code: 10026
- Dialing code: 011
- Patron saint: Saint Lawrence
- Saint day: 10 August
- Website: Official website

Santena (Italian pronunciation: [ˈsantena]; Piedmontese: Santna) is a comune (municipality) in the Metropolitan City of Turin in the Italian region Piedmont, located about 15 kilometres (9 mi) southeast of Turin on the right bank of the Po.

The frazione of Gamenario is known for the Battle of Gamenario, fought on 22 April 1345 between the Guelphs and Ghibellines. Sights include the castle, built by Carlo Ottavio Benso in 1712–20. It houses furnitures and memories of the families who lived there, including a vase donated by Napoleon III of France to Camillo Benso, Conte di Cavour in 1856. Nearby is a 23-hectare (57-acre) English landscape garden built under Cavour's father, Michele Giuseppe Francesco Antonio Benso, 4th Marquess of Cavour (1781-1850), in the early 18th century.

Santena borders the following municipalities: Chieri, Cambiano, Trofarello, Poirino, and Villastellone.

== Heritage and culture ==
=== Twin cities ===
Since 2015, Santena is joined as a twin city with the following cities:

- Plombières-les-Bains, commune of France located in the Vosges department in the region Grand Est.
