= Cambiano =

Cambiano Cambiagn
- Comune
- Comune di Cambiano
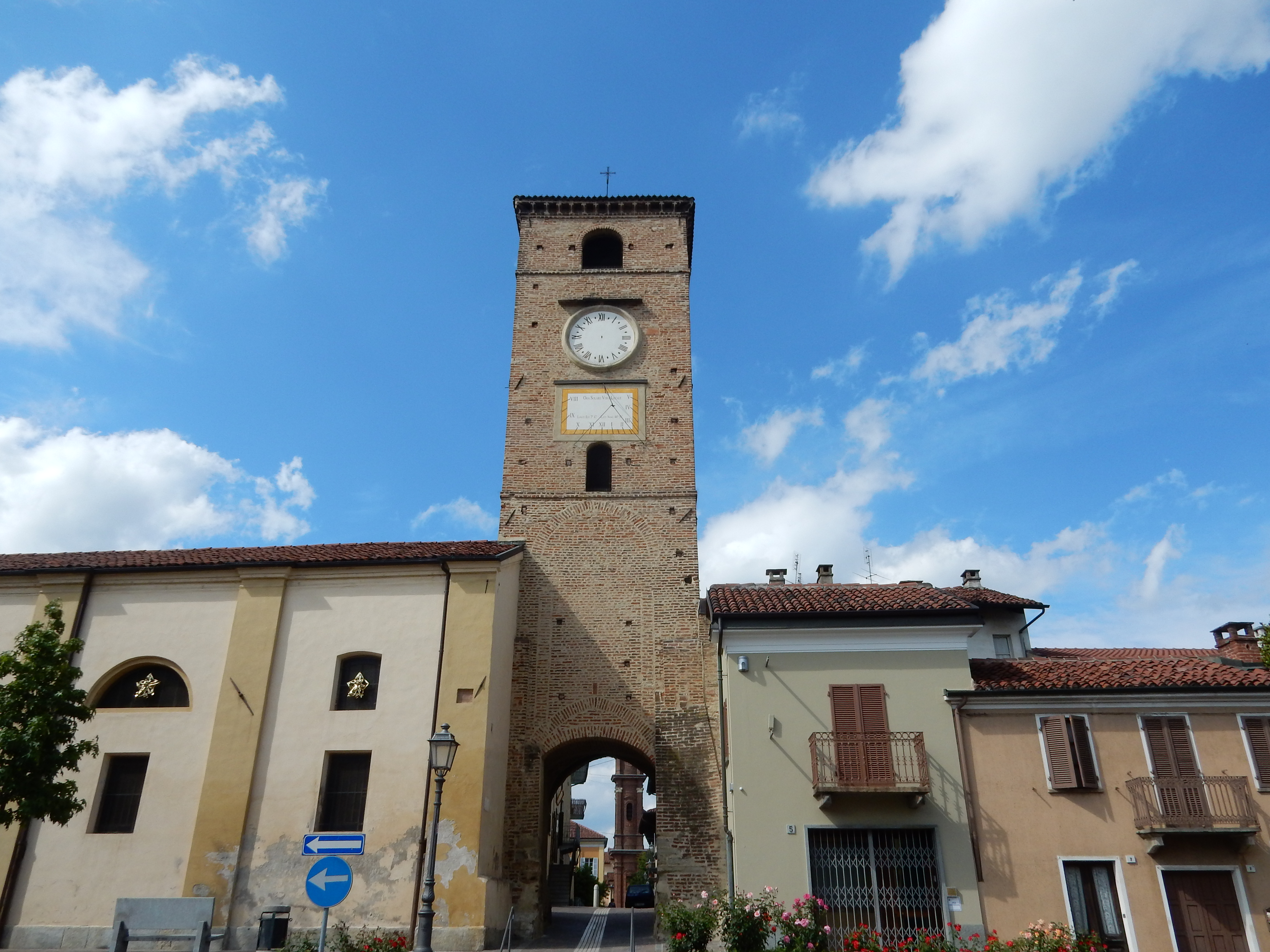

- Coat of arms

- Location within Italy Location within Piedmont
- Coordinates: 44°58′15″N 7°46′39″E
- Country: Italy
- Region: Piedmont
- Metropolitan city: Turin (TO)
- Frazioni: Madonna della Scala

Government
  - Mayor: Carlo Vergnano

Area
  - Total: 14.13 km^{2} (5.46 sq mi)
- Elevation: 253 m (830 ft)

Population (1-1-2017)
  - Total: 6,086
  - Density: 430.7/km^{2} (1,116/sq mi)
- Demonym: Cambianese(i)
- Time zone: UTC+1 (CET)
  - Summer (DST): UTC+2 (CEST)
- Postal code: 10020
- Dialing code: 011
- Website: Official website

Cambiano (Piedmontese: Cambiagn) is a comune (municipality) in the Metropolitan City of Turin in the Italian region Piedmont, located about 13 kilometres (8 mi) southeast of Turin.

Cambiano borders the following municipalities: Pino Torinese, Chieri, Pecetto Torinese, Moncalieri, Trofarello, Santena, and Villastellone.

== Twin towns – sister cities ==
Cambiano is twinned with:

- Aquilonia, Italy
- Monteverde, Italy
