= Settimo Torinese =

Settimo Torinese Ël Seto
- Comune
- Città di Settimo Torinese
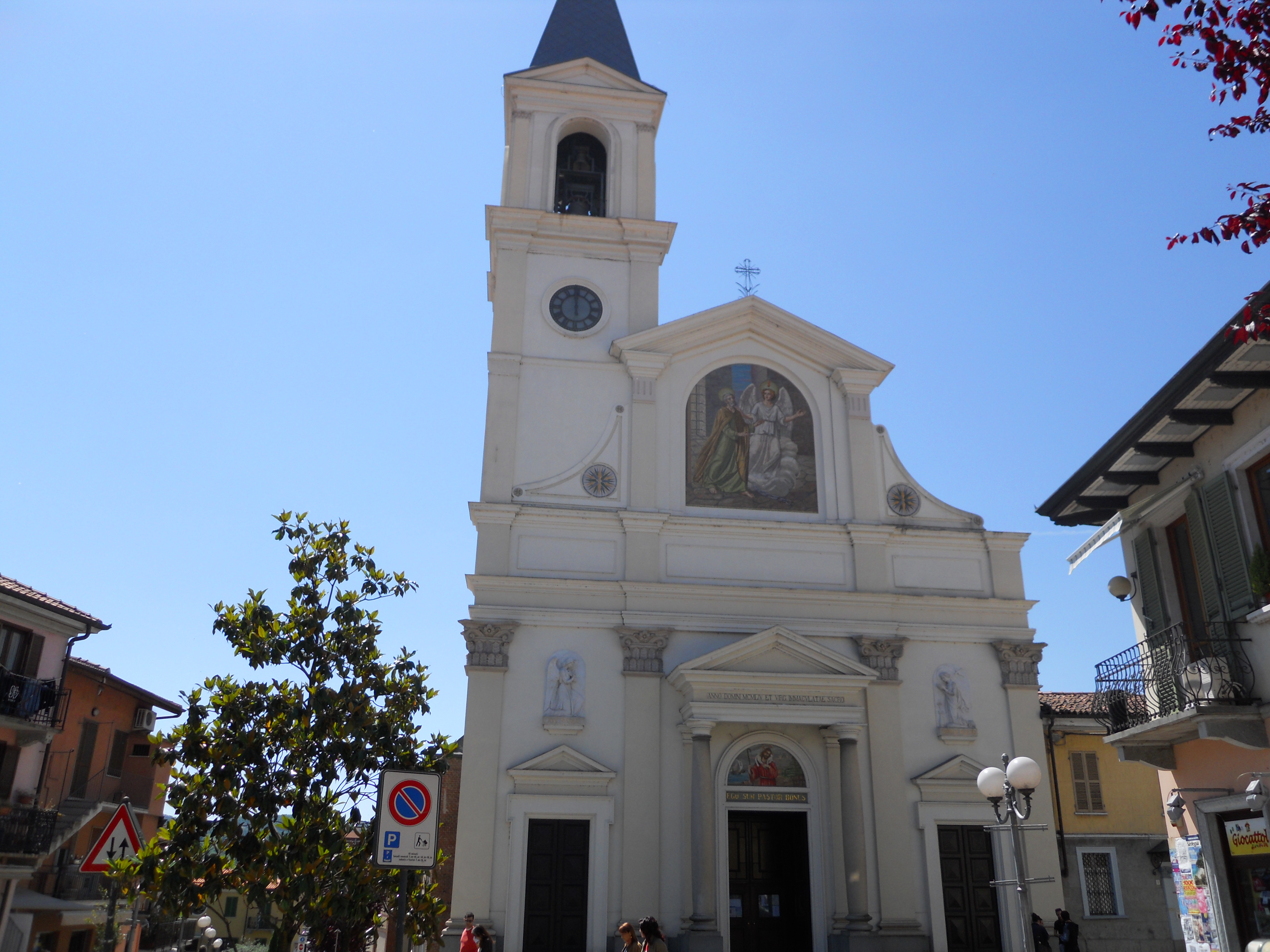

- Coat of arms

- Location within Italy Location within Piedmont
- Coordinates: 45°8′N 7°46′E
- Country: Italy
- Region: Piedmont
- Metropolitan city: Turin (TO)
- Frazioni: Borgata Paradiso, Fornacino, Mezzi Po, Villaggio Olimpia, Villaggio Ulla

Government
  - Mayor: Elena Piastra (from 2019) (PD)

Area
  - Total: 32.37 km^{2} (12.50 sq mi)
- Elevation: 207 m (679 ft)

Population (1-1-2017)
  - Total: 47,485
  - Density: 1,467/km^{2} (3,799/sq mi)
- Demonym: Settimese(i)
- Time zone: UTC+1 (CET)
  - Summer (DST): UTC+2 (CEST)
- Postal code: 10036
- Dialing code: 011
- Patron saint: Saint's Bodies
- Saint day: First Sunday of September
- Website: Official website

Settimo Torinese (Piedmontese: Ël Seto) is a comune in the Metropolitan City of Turin, in Piedmont, Italy. The name settimo means "seventh", and it comes from the comune's distance from Turin, which is seven Roman miles. It is bordered by the other comuni of Leinì, Mappano, Volpiano, Brandizzo, San Mauro Torinese, Gassino Torinese, Castiglione Torinese, and Turin.

Sights include the Tower of Settimo, the last remains of the medieval castle (13th–14th centuries) mostly destroyed in the 16th century wars.

== Twin cities ==
- Cavarzere, Italy
- Chaville, France
- Valls, Spain
