= Bruino =

- Comune
- Comune di Bruino
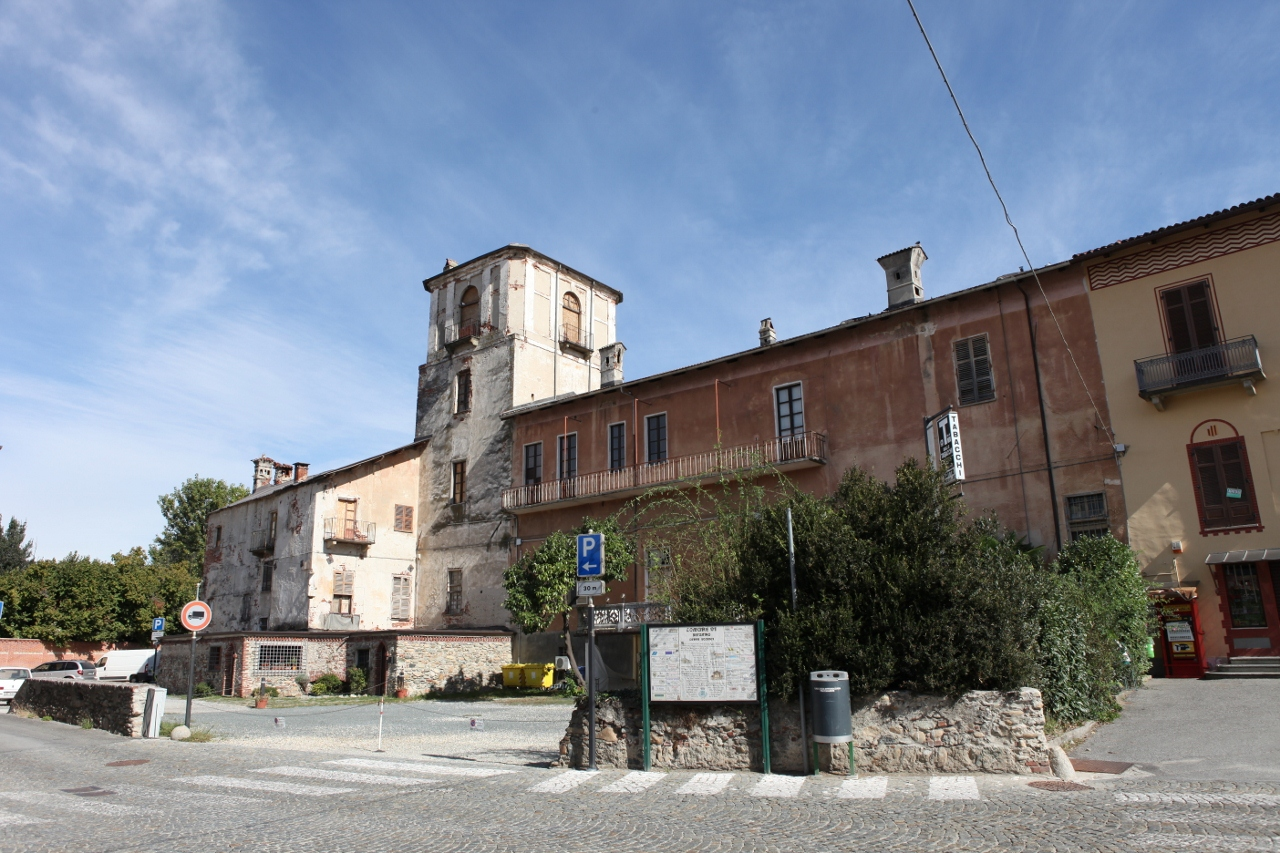

- Coat of arms

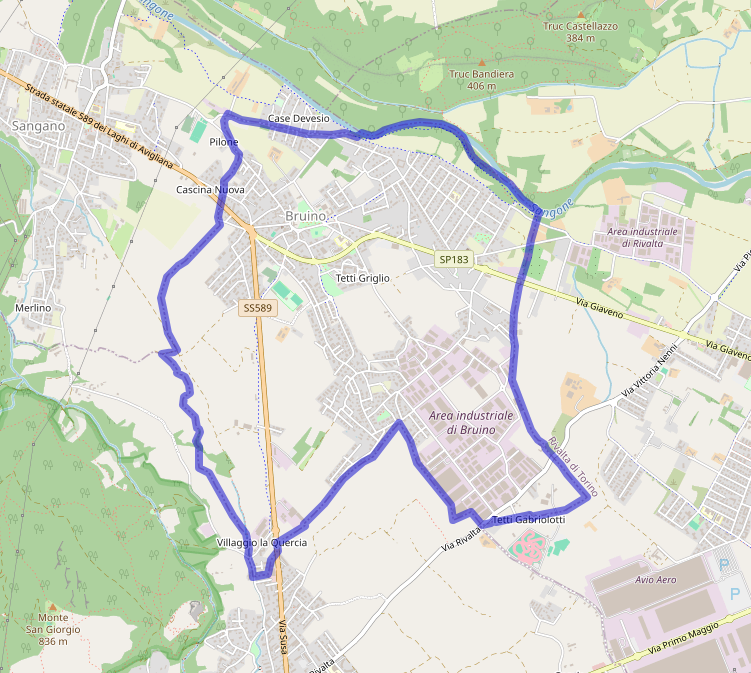

- Location within Italy Location within Piedmont
- Coordinates: 45°1′N 7°28′E
- Country: Italy
- Region: Piedmont
- Metropolitan city: Turin (TO)
- Frazioni: Villaggio Alba Serena, Marinella, La Quercia, Valverde

Government
  - Mayor: Cesare Riccardo

Area
  - Total: 5.57 km^{2} (2.15 sq mi)
- Elevation: 320 m (1,050 ft)

Population (1-1-2017)
  - Total: 8,520
  - Density: 1,530/km^{2} (3,960/sq mi)
- Demonym: Bruinese(i)
- Time zone: UTC+1 (CET)
  - Summer (DST): UTC+2 (CEST)
- Postal code: 10090
- Dialing code: 011
- Website: Official website

Bruino is a comune (municipality) in the Metropolitan City of Turin in the Italian region Piedmont, located about 20 kilometres (12 mi) southwest of Turin.
