= Rivalta di Torino =

- Comune
- Comune di Rivalta di Torino
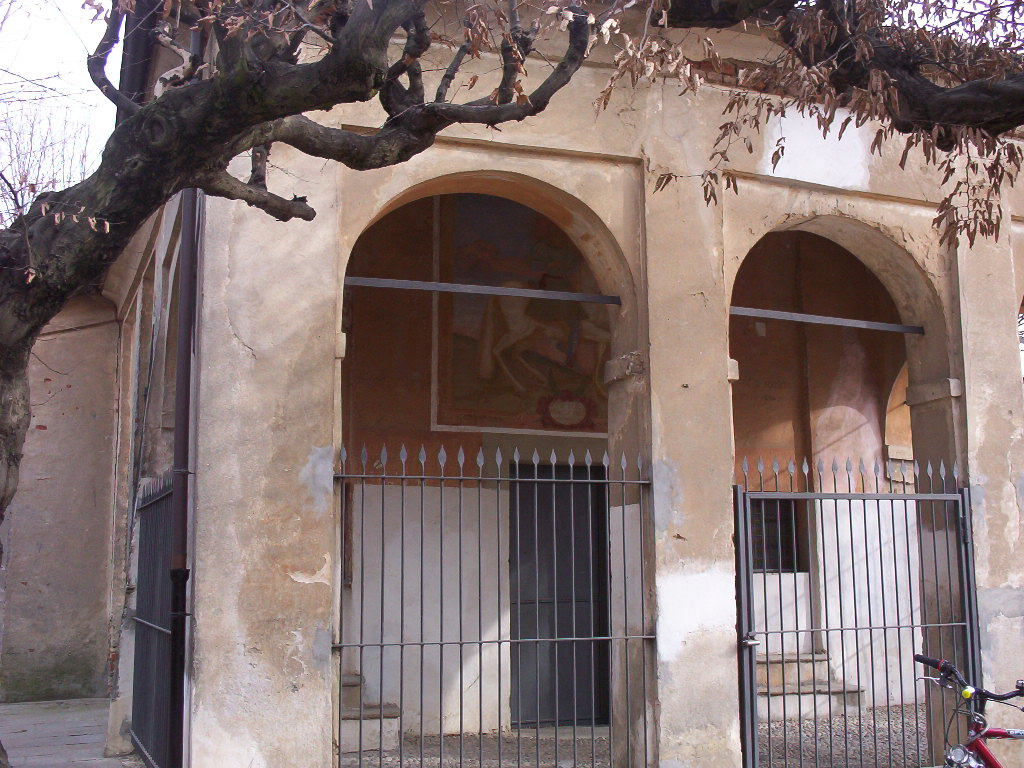
- The Chapel of San Vittore and Corona.

- Coat of arms

- Location within Italy Location within Piedmont
- Coordinates: 45°2′N 7°31′E
- Country: Italy
- Region: Piedmont
- Metropolitan city: Turin (TO)
- Frazioni: Gerbole, Pasta, Tetti Francesi

Government
  - Mayor: Nicola De Ruggiero (PD)

Area
  - Total: 25.3 km^{2} (9.8 sq mi)
- Elevation: 295 m (968 ft)

Population (31 December 2010)
  - Total: 19,422
  - Density: 768/km^{2} (1,990/sq mi)
- Demonym: Rivaltesi
- Time zone: UTC+1 (CET)
  - Summer (DST): UTC+2 (CEST)
- Postal code: 10040
- Dialing code: 011
- Website: Official website

Rivalta di Torino is a comune (municipality) in the Metropolitan City of Turin in the Italian region Piedmont, located about 14 km southwest of Turin in the valley of the Sangone.

It is home to a medieval castle, around which the town originated starting from the 11th century. The castle and the village were owned by the Orsini local branch until 1823. The castle has a massive appearance and was once accessed through a drawbridge, now replaced by a stone one. In 1836 French writer Honoré de Balzac was guest of the local lord, count Cesare Benevello, as testified by an inscription in the castle's court.
