= Trana =

Comune in Piedmont, Italy, near Turin

- Comune
- Comune di Trana
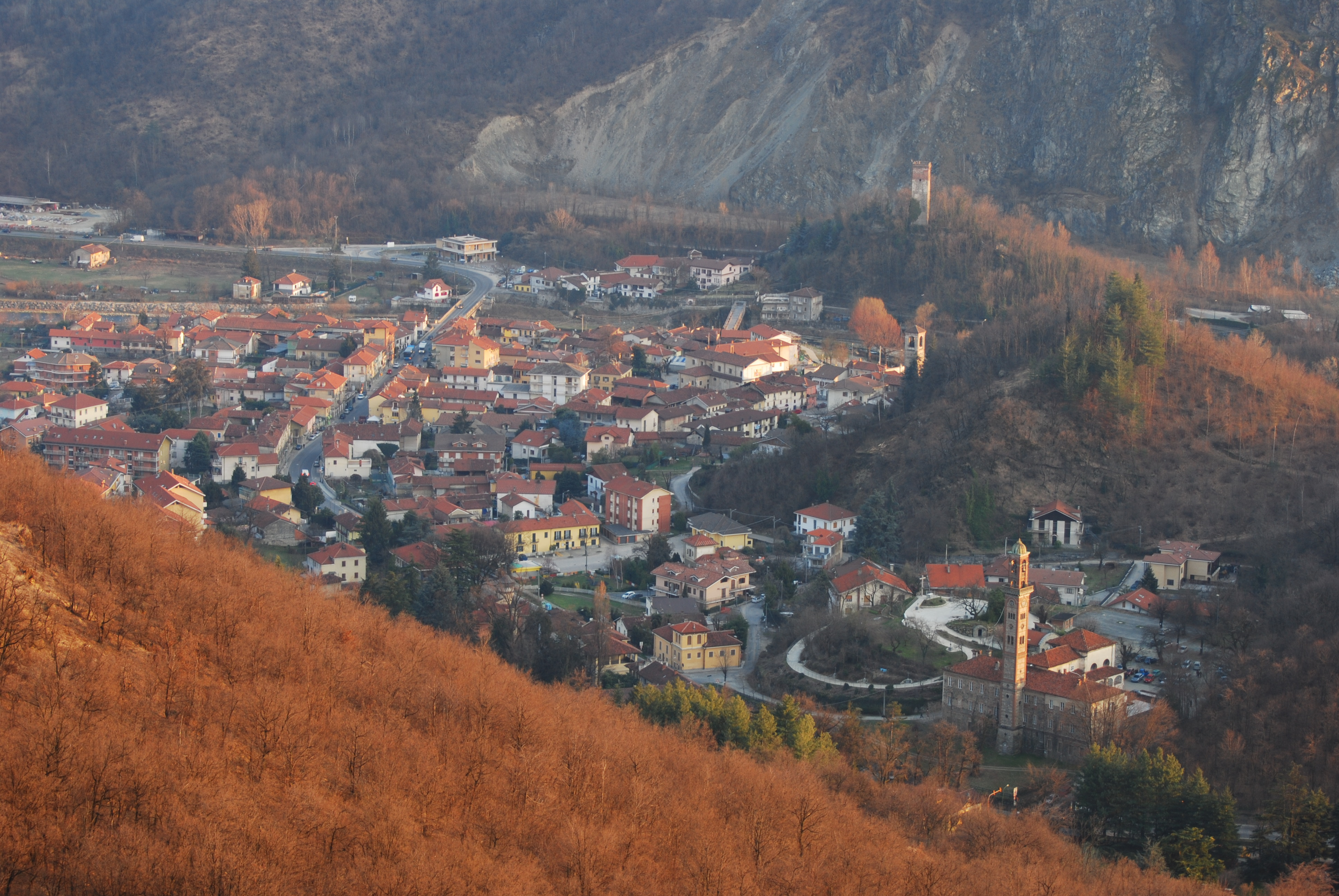

- Coat of arms

- Location within Italy Location within Piedmont
- Coordinates: 45°2′N 7°25′E
- Country: Italy
- Region: Piedmont
- Metropolitan city: Turin (TO)
- Frazioni: Belvedere, Biellese, Colombé, Cordero, Durando, Galletto, Moranda, Pianca, San Bernardino, San Giovanni

Government
  - Mayor: Ezio Sada

Area
  - Total: 16.4 km^{2} (6.3 sq mi)
- Elevation: 372 m (1,220 ft)

Population (31 December 2010)
  - Total: 3,874
  - Density: 236/km^{2} (612/sq mi)
- Demonym: Tranesi
- Time zone: UTC+1 (CET)
  - Summer (DST): UTC+2 (CEST)
- Postal code: 10090
- Dialing code: 011
- Patron saint: Nativity of Mary
- Saint day: 8 September

Trana is a comune (municipality) in the Metropolitan City of Turin in the northern Italian region Piedmont, located about 25 kilometres (16 mi) west of Turin.

== Related articles ==
- Monte Pietraborga
