= Leini =

Leini Leinì
- Comune
- Comune di Leini
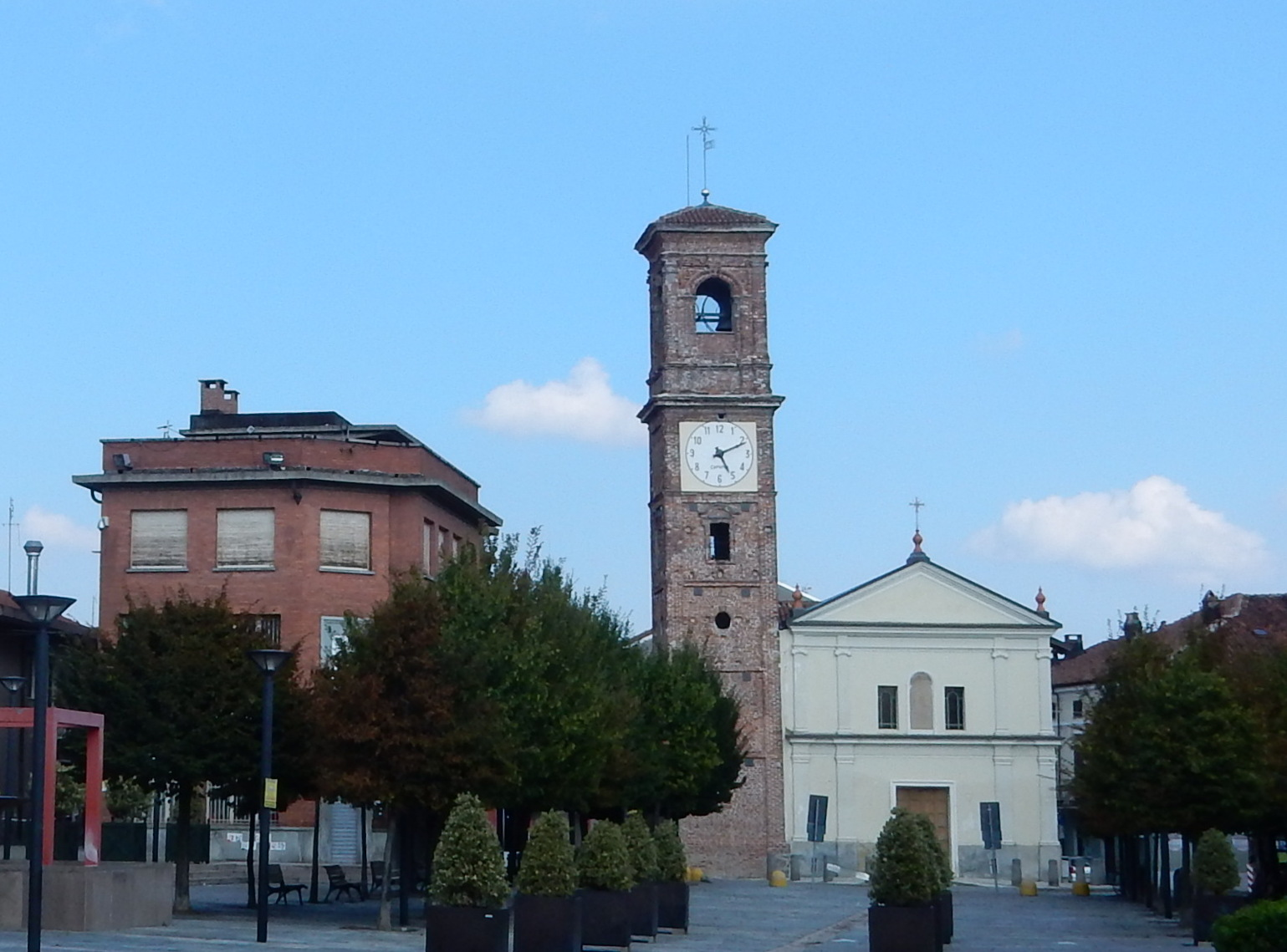
- Piazza Vittorio Emanuele II, the main square

- Location within Italy Location within Piedmont
- Coordinates: 45°11′N 7°43′E
- Country: Italy
- Region: Piedmont
- Metropolitan city: Turin (TO)
- Frazioni: Fornacino, Tedeschi, Grivetta, Auture, Canova, Cascinotta, Castaudia, Centrale Enel, Frati, Grangiotto, Maffei, Montegrappa, Muzio, Pogliani, Pratonuovo, Ranera, Ruffini, Santarosa, Settimo, Siberia, Torino, Vastamia

Government
  - Mayor: Luca Torella

Area
  - Total: 32.45 km^{2} (12.53 sq mi)
- Elevation: 245 m (804 ft)

Population (30 April 2025)
  - Total: 16,208
  - Density: 499.5/km^{2} (1,294/sq mi)
- Demonym: Leinicesi
- Time zone: UTC+1 (CET)
  - Summer (DST): UTC+2 (CEST)
- Postal code: 10040
- Dialing code: 011
- Patron saint: Saint Lawrence
- Saint day: 10 august
- Website: Official website

Leini (formerly Leyni), is a comune (municipality) in the Metropolitan City of Turin in the Italian region Piedmont, located about 13 kilometres (8 mi) north of Turin.

== Twin towns ==
- (Ivory Coast) Bangolo, Côte d'Ivoire, since 2004
