= List of bridges in Italy =

This list of bridges in Italy lists bridges of particular historical, scenic, architectural or engineering interest. Road and railway bridges, viaducts, aqueducts and footbridges are included.

== Historical and architectural interest bridges ==
	Name	Distinction	Length	Type	Carries Crosses	Opened	Location	Region	Ref.
1	Pons Sublicius destroyed			Beam bridge Wood	Tiber	621 BC	Rome; 41°53′17.0″N 12°28′47.0″E	Lazio	
2	Pons Aemilius in ruins	Oldest stone bridge in Rome	160 m (520 ft)	Masonry; 1 arch remaining (originally 6)	Tiber	179 BC	Rome; 41°53′21.6″N 12°28′45.7″E	Lazio	
3	Ponte Milvio	Constructed under Marcus Aemilius Scaurus	136 m (446 ft)	Masonry; 6 arches	Via Flaminia - Via Cassia; Tiber	115 BC	Rome; 41°56′07.8″N 12°28′01.1″E	Lazio	
4	Ponte dell'Abbadia			Masonry; 1 arch	Fiora	90 BC	Montalto di Castro; 42°25′47.6″N 11°37′53.8″E	Lazio	
5	Pons Fabricius	Oldest bridge in Rome in its original state Constructed under Cicero	62 m (203 ft)	Masonry; 2 arches	Tiber	62 BC	Rome - Tiber Island; 41°53′27.9″N 12°28′41.5″E	Lazio	
6	Pons Cestius			Masonry; 3 arches	Via in Piscinula; Tiber	44 BC	Rome - Tiber Island; 41°53′24.1″N 12°28′38.2″E	Lazio	
7	Pont-Saint-Martin	Span : 31.4 m (103 ft)		Masonry; 1 arch	Via Roma / rue de Rome; Lys	40 BC	Pont-Saint-Martin; 45°35′57.8″N 7°48′00.4″E	Aosta Valley	
8	Bridge of Augustus in ruins	Span : 32.1 m (105 ft); Height : 30 m (98 ft)	160 m (520 ft)	Masonry; 4 arches originally	Via Flaminia; Nera	27 BC	Narni; 42°31′30.3″N 12°30′52.2″E	Umbria	
9	Ponte Romano di Solestà	Span : 22.2 m (73 ft); Height : 25 m (82 ft)	62 m (203 ft)	Masonry; 1 arch, (travertine)	Via Adriano Rigantè; Tronto	25 BC	Ascoli Piceno; 42°51′30.5″N 13°34′18.8″E	Marche	
10	Ponte di Cecco			Masonry; 2 arches	Via Ponte di Cecco; Castellano	25 BC	Ascoli Piceno; 42°51′09.6″N 13°35′09.1″E	Marche	
11	Pont d'Aël	Height : 66 m (217 ft)	60 m (200 ft)	Masonry; 1 arch	Former aqueduct Footbridge; Pont-d'Aël hamlet Grand Eyvia	3 BC	Aymavilles; 45°40′36.1″N 7°13′20.1″E	Aosta Valley	
12	Ponte di Annibale		13 m (43 ft)	Masonry; 1 arch	Footbridge; Torrente Titerno	3 BC	Cerreto Sannita; 41°17′31.3″N 14°32′57.4″E	Campania	
13	Ponte Pietra	City of Verona; World Heritage Site (2000)	92 m (302 ft)	Masonry; 5 arches	Footbridge; Via Postumia; Adige	1st century BC	Verona; 45°26′52.0″N 11°00′00.1″E	Veneto	(Note: The Ponte Pietra and the Ponte Scaligero in Verona were completely destroyed on April 24, 1945 by German troops who were covering their retreat, the materials were however recovered in the river bed to allow an identical reconstruction of the two structures after the war.)
14	Ponte Salario destroyed	Span : 24.8 m (81 ft)	72 m (236 ft)	Masonry; 3 arches	Via Salaria; Aniene	1st century BC	Rome; 41°56′23.4″N 12°30′31.3″E	Lazio	
15	Ponte Molino		50 m (160 ft)	Masonry; 5 arches	Via Torquato Tasso; Via Dante; Bacchiglione	1st century BC	Padua; 45°24′42.0″N 11°52′25.6″E	Veneto	
16	Ponte Nomentano			Masonry; 1 arch	Via Nomentana; Aniene	1st century BC	Rome; 41°56′00.9″N 12°31′56.9″E	Lazio	
17	Roman Bridge of Châtillon in ruins		15 m (49 ft)	Masonry; 1 arch	Rue du pont romain Marmore		Châtillon; 45°44′52.8″N 7°36′39.1″E	Aosta Valley	
18	Ponte di Tiberio	Constructed under Tiberius	62 m (203 ft)	Masonry; 5 arches	Via Aemilia; Marecchia	20	Rimini; 44°03′49.1″N 12°33′49.8″E	Emilia-Romagna	
19	Ponte Sant'Angelo	Constructed under Hadrian	135 m (443 ft)	Masonry; 2 arches	Lungotevere Vaticano; Via del Banco di Santo Spirito; Tiber	134	Rome; 41°54′06.8″N 12°27′59.2″E	Lazio	
20	Ponte Leproso			Masonry; 2 arches	Appian Way; Via Antico Sannio; Via Santa Clementina; Sabato	4th century	Benevento; 41°07′53.1″N 14°45′55.4″E	Campania	
21	Ponte Gobbo	Devil's Bridge	273 m (896 ft)	Masonry; 11 arches	Footbridge; Trebbia		Bobbio; 44°46′02.0″N 9°23′29.5″E	Emilia-Romagna	
22	Ponte di Attone			Masonry; 1 arch	Footbridge; Imagna Torrente	10th century	Ubiale Clanezzo; 45°45′37.7″N 9°36′11.3″E	Lombardy	
23	Ponte dell'Ammiraglio			Masonry; 2 arches	Footbridge; Oreto River	1113	Palermo; 38°06′18.1″N 13°22′30.3″E	Sicily	
24	Ponte della Maddalena	Devil's Bridge; Span : 37.8 m (124 ft)	95 m (312 ft)	Masonry; 5 arches	Via Francigena; Serchio	11th century	Borgo a Mozzano; 43°59′08.4″N 10°33′06.3″E	Tuscany	
25	Ponte della Gaietta partially destroyed	Bridge castle		Masonry; 1 arch	Footbridge; Val Bormida	12th century	Millesimo; 44°21′48.0″N 8°12′18.6″E	Liguria	
26	Ponte Buriano	Possibly the bridge used by Leonardo da Vinci in his painting Mona Lisa		Masonry; 7 arches	Strada provinciale 1 Arno	1277	Arezzo; 43°30′16.9″N 11°47′58.3″E	Tuscany	
27	Ponte Vecchio di Dolceacqua			Masonry; 1 arch	Via Giardini; Nervia	13th century	Dolceacqua; 43°51′05.1″N 7°37′26.7″E	Liguria	
28	Ponte alla Carraia	Historic Centre of Florence; World Heritage Site (1982)		Masonry; 5 arches	Via del Moro - Via dei Serragli; Arno	1304	Florence; 43°46′12.9″N 11°14′50.4″E	Tuscany	(Note: All of Florence's bridges except the Ponte Vecchio were demolished by Germans in 1944 and rebuilt identically after the war.)
29	Ponte Vecchio	Built-on bridge Historic Centre of Florence; World Heritage Site (1982)	90 m (300 ft)	Masonry; 3 arches	Via Por Santa Maria - Via de' Guicciardini; Arno	1345	Florence; 43°46′04.9″N 11°15′11.4″E	Tuscany	
30	Ponte Coperto	Covered bridge	216 m (709 ft)	Masonry; 5 arches	Viale Lungo Ticino Visconti - Via Milazzo; Ticino	1351	Pavia; 45°10′50.2″N 9°09′11.7″E	Lombardy	(Note: Damaged by Allied bombing in September 1944, the Ponte Coperto was finally blown up in 1948. It was rebuilt from 1949 to 1951 30 meters downstream with a slightly simplified architecture.)
31	Ponte Scaligero	City of Verona; World Heritage Site (2000); Span : 48.7 m (160 ft)	120 m (390 ft)	Masonry; 3 arches	Adige	1356	Verona; 45°26′25.5″N 10°59′14.3″E	Veneto	
32	Ponte di San Francesco	Span : 37 m (121 ft)		Masonry; 1 arch	Corso Cesare Battisti - Via San Francesco; Aniene	1358	Subiaco; 41°55′27.6″N 13°05′21.2″E	Lazio	
33	Trezzo sull'Adda Bridge destroyed in 1416	Largest span in the world until the 19th century Span : 72 m (236 ft)		Masonry	Adda	1377	Trezzo sull'Adda; 45°36′43.6″N 9°31′24.8″E	Lombardy	
34	Ponte del Diavolo (Lanzo Torinese)	Devil's Bridge; Span : 37 m (121 ft)		Masonry; 1 arch	Footbridge; Stura di Lanzo	1378	Lanzo Torinese; 45°16′04.6″N 7°28′53.1″E	Piedmont	
35	Ponte delle Torri	Highest bridge in the world until 1785; Height : 80 m (260 ft)	230 m (750 ft)	Masonry; 10 arches	Via Giro del Ponte; Tessino Torrente	14th century	Spoleto; 42°43′58.3″N 12°44′38.3″E	Umbria	(Note: The exact date of construction of the Ponte delle Torri of Spoleto is not known, it held the record for the highest bridge in the world until the inauguration of the Puente Nuevo at Ronda in Spain in 1785 with its 98 meters of clear height.)
36	Ponte del Diavolo (Cividale del Friuli)	Devil's Bridge	50 m (160 ft)	Masonry; 2 arches	Corso Paolino d'Aquileia - Via Borgo di Ponte; Natisone	1442	Cividale del Friuli; 46°05′31.0″N 13°25′53.9″E	Friuli-Venezia Giulia	
37	Ponte Sisto		105 m (344 ft)	Masonry; 4 arches	Via del Conservatorio - Via di Ponte Sisto; Tiber	1479	Rome; 41°53′32.6″N 12°28′14.7″E	Lazio	
38	Ponte della Gula	Devil's Bridge		Masonry; 1 arch	Footbridge; Mastallone	15th century	Varallo Sesia; 45°50′40.6″N 8°14′57.4″E	Piedmont	
39	Ponte Santa Trinita	Oldest flattened elliptic arch bridge in the world Historic Centre of Florence; World Heritage Site (1982)		Masonry; 3 arches	Via de' Tornabuoni - Via Maggio; Arno	1569	Florence; 43°46′08.5″N 11°15′01.2″E	Tuscany	
40	Ponte Vecchio, Bassano		69 m (226 ft)	Beam; Wood; Covered bridge	Footbridge; Brenta	1569	Bassano del Grappa; 45°46′03.0″N 11°43′52.2″E	Veneto	
41	Rialto Bridge	Oldest bridge spanning the Grand Canal in Venice; Venice and its Lagoon; World Heritage Site (1987)	48 m (157 ft)	Masonry; 1 arch	Footbridge; Grand Canal	1591	Venice; 45°26′17.0″N 12°20′09.4″E	Veneto	
42	Bridge of Sighs	Venice and its Lagoon; World Heritage Site (1987)	11 m (36 ft)	Masonry; 1 arch, Istrian stone and marble	Footbridge; Rio de la Canonica	1602	Venice; 45°26′02.6″N 12°20′27.1″E	Veneto	
43	Steinerner Steg	Cultural heritage monument (ID:16054) (South Tyrol)		Masonry; 2 arches	Via Ponte Romano; Passer	1617	Merano; 46°40′17.8″N 11°10′09.2″E	Trentino-Alto Adige/Südtirol	
44	Ponte dei Trepponti			Masonry; Bricks	Footbridge; Antico canale navigabile Pallotta	1634	Comacchio; 44°41′34.8″N 12°10′59.7″E	Emilia-Romagna	
45	Ponte dei Tre Archi	Venice and its Lagoon; World Heritage Site (1987)		Masonry; 3 arches	Footbridge; Cannaregio Canal	1688	Venice; 45°26′44.1″N 12°19′14.7″E	Veneto	
46	Ponte sul torrente Nervi			Masonry; 1 arch	Footbridge; Nervi Torrente	17th century	Genoa; 44°23′04.3″N 9°02′00.3″E	Liguria	
47	Ponte Vecchio, Ivrea		38 m (125 ft)	Masonry; 3 arches	Dora Baltea	1716	Ivrea; 45°27′52.7″N 7°52′15.9″E	Piedmont	
48	Aqueduct of Vanvitelli; Ponti della Valle di Maddaloni	World Heritage Site (1997); Height : 55.8 m (183 ft)	529 m (1,736 ft)	Masonry; 3 levels (19, 28 and 42 arches)	Aqueduct	1762	Valle di Maddaloni; 41°03′34.2″N 14°24′06.2″E	Campania	
49	Ponte Vecchio, Cesena		111 m (364 ft)	Masonry; 3 arches	Road bridge Savio	1779	Cesena; 44°08′02.2″N 12°14′01.7″E	Emilia-Romagna	
50	Ponte del Torcolo	Cultural heritage monument (ID:18058) (South Tyrol)	33 m (108 ft)	Covered bridge Wood	Footbridge; Eisack	1804	Kastelruth; 46°33′52.1″N 11°30′56.3″E	Trentino-Alto Adige/Südtirol	
51	Ponte de Campodazzo	Cultural heritage monument (ID:18090) (South Tyrol)		Covered bridge Wood	Footbridge; Eisack	1818	Ritten - Völs am Schlern; 46°32′03.3″N 11°29′37.6″E	Trentino-Alto Adige/Südtirol	
52	Ponte del Passo	Cultural heritage monument (ID:18091) (South Tyrol)		Covered bridge Wood	Footbridge; Eisack		Völs am Schlern; 46°30′48.8″N 11°28′41.6″E	Trentino-Alto Adige/Südtirol	
53	Real Ferdinando Bridge	First modern suspension bridge in Italy	80 m (260 ft)	Suspension; Chain bridge, iron deck, masonry pylons	Footbridge; Garigliano	1832	Minturno; 41°14′31.2″N 13°46′18.9″E	Lazio	
54	Ponte Gregoriano		28 m (92 ft)	Masonry; 1 arch	Via del Ponte Gregoriano; Aniene	1835	Tivoli; 41°57′55.9″N 12°48′01.1″E	Lazio	
55	Venice Railroad Bridge	Longest railway bridge in Europe when it opens	3,605 m (11,827 ft)	Masonry; 210 arches	Milan–Venice railway Venetian Lagoon	1846	Venice; 45°27′15.0″N 12°17′54.3″E	Veneto	
56	Ponte Garibaldi		120 m (390 ft)	Arch; Wrought iron deck arch	Via Arenula - Viale di Trastevere; Tiber	1888	Rome; 41°53′27.8″N 12°28′28.2″E	Lazio	
57	Ponte Girevole		90 m (300 ft)	Truss; Steel; Swing bridge	Corso Vittorio Emanuele II - Via Giacomo Matteotti; Gulf of Taranto	1887	Taranto; 40°28′23.5″N 17°14′07.5″E	Apulia	
58	Introd Bridge (Lo pon noù)	Height : 80 m (260 ft)		Masonry; 1 arch	Regional Road 23; Norat hamlet Savara	1916	Introd; 45°41′29.7″N 7°11′07.0″E	Aosta Valley	
59	Ponte dell'Accademia	Venice and its Lagoon; World Heritage Site (1987)		Arch; Wooden deck arch	Footbridge; Grand Canal	1933	Venice; 45°25′54.0″N 12°19′44.2″E	Veneto	
60	Ponte degli Scalzi	Venice and its Lagoon; World Heritage Site (1987)		Masonry; 1 arch	Footbridge; Grand Canal	1934	Venice; 45°26′28.2″N 12°19′21.8″E	Veneto	
61	Ponte di Mezzo		89 m (292 ft)	Arch; Concrete deck arch	Road bridge Arno	1950	Pisa; 43°42′57.3″N 10°24′06.9″E	Tuscany	
62	Ponte Flaminio		255 m (837 ft)	Arch; Concrete deck arch	Corso di Francia; Tiber	1950	Rome; 41°56′10.5″N 12°28′18.2″E	Lazio	

== Architectural bridges ==
	Name	Span	Length	Type	Carries Crosses	Opened	Location	Region	Ref.
1	Musmeci Bridge	Concrete structure 30 cm thick	287 m (942 ft)	Arch; Concrete deck arch	Road bridge Basento	1975	Potenza; 40°37′39.0″N 15°48′22.2″E	Basilicata	
2	Ponte Laterale Nord; Ponte Laterale Sud	Design by Santiago Calatrava; 2 identical bridges	180 m (590 ft)	Cable-stayed; Steel box girder deck, steel pylon	Road bridges Viale dei Trattati di Roma	2007	Reggio Emilia; 44°43′50.4″N 10°38′21.1″E; 44°43′24.5″N 10°37′57.5″E	Emilia-Romagna	
3	Ponte della Costituzione	Design by Santiago Calatrava	88 m (289 ft)	Arch; Steel deck arch	Footbridge [[Grand Canal (Venice)[Grand Canal]]	2008	Venice; 45°26′19.9″N 12°19′10.0″E	Veneto	
4	Ponte del Mare		466 m (1,529 ft)	Cable-stayed; Steel curved deck, steel pylon	Footbridge; Aterno-Pescara	2009	Pescara; 42°28′01.3″N 14°13′29.6″E	Abruzzo	
5	Ponte della Scienza		147 m (482 ft)	Beam; Steel	Footbridge; Tiber	2012	Rome; 41°52′06.6″N 12°28′25.3″E	Lazio	

== Major road and railway bridges ==
This table presents the structures with spans greater than 200 meters (non-exhaustive list).

	Name	Span	Length	Type	Carries Crosses	Opened	Location	Region	Ref.
1	Sfalassà Viaduct	376 m (1,234 ft)	893 m (2,930 ft)	Box girder Steel; V-shaped legs	Autostrada A2; Sfalassà Gorge	1973	Bagnara Calabra; 38°16′16.9″N 15°48′11.1″E	Calabria	
2	Adige Highway Bridge	310 m (1,020 ft)	1,087 m (3,566 ft)	Cable-stayed; Composite steel/concrete deck, steel pylons 140+310+140	Autostrada A31; Adige	2014	Piacenza d'Adige - Badia Polesine; 45°07′14.9″N 11°31′45.8″E	Veneto	
3	Viadotto Platano	291 m (955 ft)	630 m (2,070 ft)	Box girder Steel; V-shaped legs	Raccordo autostradale 5 Platano Gorge	1978	Romagnano al Monte; 40°36′54.5″N 15°27′15.8″E	Campania; Basilicata	
4	Cadore Viaduct	272 m (892 ft)	535 m (1,755 ft)	Box girder Steel; V-shaped legs	Strada statale 51; Piave	1985	Pieve di Cadore; 46°24′10.5″N 12°22′20.1″E	Veneto	
5	Ponte di Boccaserio	252 m (827 ft)	400 m (1,300 ft)	Cable-stayed; Steel box girder deck, inclined steel pylons 75+252+75	Strada provinciale 591; Adda	2009	Bertonico; 45°15′16.1″N 9°42′01.3″E	Lombardy	
6	Marchetti Viaduct	250 m (820 ft)	258 m (846 ft)	Arch; Steel tied-arch	Autostrada A4/A5	2015	Pavone Canavese; 45°25′30.4″N 7°51′10.2″E	Piedmont	
7	Bisantis Bridge	231 m (758 ft)	468 m (1,535 ft)	Arch; Concrete deck arch	Road bridge Fiumarella	1961	Catanzaro; 38°54′23.9″N 16°35′04.3″E	Calabria	
8	Ponte Centrale	221 m (725 ft)		Arch; Steel tied-arch	Road bridge Viale dei Trattati di Roma; Autostrada A1; Milan–Bologna HSR	2006	Reggio Emilia; 44°43′39.5″N 10°38′14.4″E	Emilia-Romagna	
9	Favazzina Viaduct	220 m (720 ft)	440 m (1,440 ft)	Cable-stayed; Composite steel/concrete deck, steel pylons 110+220+110; Twin bridges	Autostrada A2; Favazzina Torrente	2013	Scilla; 38°15′16.2″N 15°46′03.5″E	Calabria	
10	Ponte Morandi collapsed in 2018	208 m (682 ft)	1,100 m (3,600 ft)	Cable-stayed; Concrete box girder deck, 3 concrete pylons 202+208+142+73; Twin bridges	Autostrada A10; Polcevera	1968	Genoa; 44°25′30.0″N 8°53′26.8″E	Liguria	
11	Indiano Bridge	206 m (676 ft)	347 m (1,138 ft)	Cable-stayed; Steel deck and pylons	SGC Firenze-Pisa-Livorno; Arno	1978	Florence; 43°47′23.9″N 11°11′46.1″E	Tuscany	
12	Sente Viaduct	200 m (660 ft) (x2)		Box girder Steel; 120+200+200+120	Strada provinciale 86 and 213; Trigno	1977	Castiglione Messer Marino - Belmonte del Sannio; 41°50′26.2″N 14°26′03.5″E	Abruzzo; Molise	
13	Po Viaduct	194 m (636 ft)	1,342 m (4,403 ft)	Cable-stayed; Concrete girder deck, concrete pylons 104+192+104	Milan–Bologna HSR; Po	2008	Piacenza - San Rocco al Porto; 45°04′40.8″N 9°44′43.3″E	Emilia-Romagna; Lombardy	
14	Carpineto Viaduct	181 m (594 ft)		Cable-stayed; Concrete deck and cable-stays, inclined concrete pylons Twin bridges	Raccordo autostradale 5	1977	Vietri di Potenza; 40°36′51.6″N 15°28′35.9″E	Basilicata	
15	Costa Viola Viaduct demolished in 2015	180 m (590 ft)	1,308 m (4,291 ft)	Box girder Prestressed concrete	Autostrada A3 (old); Condoleo Torrente	1972	Scilla; 38°15′10.9″N 15°44′37.7″E	Calabria	
16	Irminio Viaduct	180 m (590 ft)	956 m (3,136 ft)	Box girder Steel	Strada statale 115; Irminio	1984	Ragusa - Modica; 36°51′51.6″N 14°43′36.9″E	Sicily	
17	San Benedetto Bridge under construction	180 m (590 ft)	613 m (2,011 ft)	Arch; Steel tied-arch 180+149	Strada provinciale 413; Po		San Benedetto Po; 45°04′26.5″N 10°56′02.1″E	Lombardy	
18	Cittadella Bridge	176 m (577 ft)	182 m (597 ft)	Arch; Steel tied-arch	Road bridge Tanaro	2016	Alessandria; 44°55′07.6″N 8°36′33.3″E	Piedmont	
19	Italia Viaduct	175 m (574 ft)	1,161 m (3,809 ft)	Box girder Steel; 125+175+125	Autostrada A2; Lao	1974	Laino Borgo; 39°56′19.3″N 15°57′33.7″E	Calabria	
20	Marmore Bridge	167 m (548 ft)	301 m (988 ft)	Arch; Steel deck arch	Strada statale 79bis Nera	2013	Terni; 42°33′11.5″N 12°42′01.4″E	Umbria	
21	Ponte sul Tevere (GRA)	166 m (545 ft)	360 m (1,180 ft)	Box girder Steel; 108+166+70; Twin bridges	Grande Raccordo Anulare; Tiber	2005	Rome; 41°59′16.6″N 12°29′52.1″E	Lazio	
22	Aglio Viaduct	163 m (535 ft)	439 m (1,440 ft)	Arch; Concrete deck arch Twin bridges	Autostrada A1; Aglio Torrente	1959	Barberino di Mugello; 44°01′39.8″N 11°13′25.3″E	Tuscany	
23	Colle Isarco Viaduct	163 m (535 ft)	1,028 m (3,373 ft)	Box girder Prestressed concrete	Autostrada A22; Eisack	1969	Colle Isarco; 46°55′58.3″N 11°26′51.2″E	Trentino-Alto Adige/Südtirol	
24	Ponte della Musica	162 m (531 ft)	187 m (614 ft)	Arch; Steel through arch	Footbridge; Public transport Tiber	2011	Rome; 41°55′35.4″N 12°27′34.9″E	Lazio	
25	Lambro Viaduct (A58)	161 m (528 ft) (x2)	1,604 m (5,262 ft)	Beam; Composite steel/concrete girder, V-shaped legs 76+161+161+76; Twin bridges	Autostrada A58; Lambro	2015	Melegnano; 45°20′42.7″N 9°20′06.6″E	Lombardy	
26	Omodeo Viaduct	160 m (520 ft)		Box girder Prestressed concrete 100+160+100	Strada provinciale 15; Lake Omodeo	1988	Tadasuni; 40°06′25.1″N 8°53′40.7″E	Sardinia	
27	San Michele Bridge	150 m (490 ft)	226 m (741 ft)	Arch; Steel deck truss arch	Strada provinciale 54 and 166; Seregno–Bergamo railway Adda	1889	Paderno d'Adda - Calusco d'Adda; 45°40′56.9″N 9°27′08.5″E	Lombardy	
28	Valgadena Bridge	150 m (490 ft)	282 m (925 ft)	Box girder Prestressed concrete	Strada provinciale 76; Valgadena	1990	Foza - Enego; 45°54′56.6″N 11°39′19.6″E	Veneto	
29	Santa Lucia Railway Bridge (1997)	150 m (490 ft)		Arch; Concrete deck arch	Bari–Taranto railway Gravina of Castelleneta	1997	Castellaneta; 40°36′45.5″N 16°56′46.2″E	Apulia	
30	Vigevano Ticino River Bridge under construction	150 m (490 ft) (x2)	490 m (1,610 ft)	Arch; Steel through arch	Road bridge Ticino		Vigevano; 45°20′27.3″N 8°52′59.5″E	Lombardy	
31	New Aglio Viaduct	148 m (486 ft) (x3)	598 m (1,962 ft)	Box girder Prestressed concrete 77+3x148+77	Autostrada A1; Variante di Valico; Aglio Torrente	2015	Barberino di Mugello; 44°01′52.4″N 11°13′16.1″E	Tuscany	
32	Ansa del Tevere Viaduct	145 m (476 ft)	198 m (650 ft)	Cable-stayed; Concrete deck and cable-stays, inclined concrete pylon 145+53	Autostrada A91	1967	Rome; 41°50′02.2″N 12°25′40.9″E	Lazio	
33	Gorsexio Viaduct	144 m (472 ft) (x3)	674 m (2,211 ft)	Box girder Prestressed concrete 84+3x144+90+66	Autostrada A26; Gorsexio Torrente	1978	Mele; 44°27′05.6″N 8°44′34.1″E	Liguria	
34	Bradanica Bridge	144 m (472 ft)	144 m (472 ft)	Arch; Steel tied-arch	Strada statale 655; Gravina Torrente	2018	Matera; 40°40′26.9″N 16°31′22.3″E	Basilicata	
35	Sambro Viaduct	140 m (460 ft)	340 m (1,120 ft)	Arch; Concrete deck arch	Autostrada A1; Sambro Torrente	1960	Monzuno; 44°16′28.4″N 11°12′04.9″E	Emilia-Romagna	
36	Bacchiglione Viaduct	140 m (460 ft)	531 m (1,742 ft)	Cable-stayed; Composite steel/concrete deck, concrete pylons 65+140+65	Autostrada A31; Bacchiglione	2012	Colzè; 45°27′43.3″N 11°37′55.5″E	Veneto	
37	Caffaro Viaduct	140 m (460 ft)	400 m (1,300 ft)	Box girder Steel; V-shaped legs Twin bridges	Autostrada A2	2015	Lauria; 40°02′09.1″N 15°52′25.2″E	Basilicata	
38	San Bartolomeo Viaduct	140 m (460 ft)	480 m (1,570 ft)	Box girder Prestressed concrete 50+120+140+120+50	Strada statale 731		Castellammare del Golfo; 38°00′56.6″N 12°53′54.0″E	Sicily	
39	Stadano Suspension Bridge	139 m (456 ft)	279 m (915 ft)	Suspension; Composite steel/concrete deck, concrete (north) and steel (south) pylons	Road bridge Via Stadano; Magra	2017	Stadano; 44°11′13.4″N 9°55′28.0″E	Tuscany	
40	Verrand Viaduct	135 m (443 ft) (x3)	600 m (2,000 ft)	Beam; Steel; 97+3x135+97	A5 Motorway	1998	Verrand; 45°46′35.4″N 6°58′32.1″E	Aosta Valley	
41	Reno River Bridge	135 m (443 ft)	573 m (1,880 ft)	Box girder Prestressed concrete 90+135+90; Twin bridges	Autostrada A1; Variante di Valico; Reno	2006	Sasso Marconi; 44°23′36.5″N 11°15′32.8″E	Emilia-Romagna	
42	Oglio River Bridge (A4)	135 m (443 ft)	280 m (920 ft)	Box girder Steel	Autostrada A4; Oglio		Castelli Calepio; 45°37′21.3″N 9°54′07.6″E	Lombardy	
43	Giuseppe Romita Viaduct	134 m (440 ft)	410 m (1,350 ft)	Arch; Concrete deck arch	Autostrada A1; Arno	1964	Levane; 43°30′27.8″N 11°38′51.4″E	Tuscany	
44	Crivel Bridge	132 m (433 ft)	134 m (440 ft)	Arch; Steel tied-arch	Strada statale 52	2013	Socchieve; 46°24′07.5″N 12°50′47.1″E	Friuli-Venezia Giulia	
45	Tiber Bridge (A1)	130 m (430 ft)	262 m (860 ft)	Box girder Prestressed concrete 65+130+65	Autostrada A1; Tiber	1986	Monterotondo; 42°06′21.2″N 12°37′14.3″E	Lazio	
46	Ponte Adige (SP 235)	130 m (430 ft) (x2)	260 m (850 ft)	Cable-stayed; Composite steel/concrete deck, steel pylon 130+130	Strada provinciale 235; Adige	2008	Lavis; 46°08′51.4″N 11°04′42.0″E	Trentino-Alto Adige/Südtirol	
47	Biscione Viaduct	130 m (430 ft)	269 m (883 ft)	Arch; Concrete deck arch	Autostrada A1; Biscione		Firenzuola; 44°07′58.0″N 11°13′15.2″E	Tuscany	
48	Ponte di Varlungo	127 m (417 ft)	375 m (1,230 ft)	Box girder Steel; V-shaped legs 2 levels	Road bridge Via Marco Polo; Arno	1981	Florence; 43°45′48.7″N 11°18′13.9″E	Tuscany	
49	Porto Marghera Bridge	126 m (413 ft)	420 m (1,380 ft)	Cable-stayed; Composite steel/concrete curved deck, concrete pylon 126+105	Road bridge Via Alessandro Volta; Canale Indusriale Ovest	2006	Marghera; 45°28′22.4″N 12°14′13.7″E	Veneto	
50	Settimia Spizzichino Bridge	126 m (413 ft)	160 m (520 ft)	Arch; Steel through arch	SC 191; Circonvallazione Ostiense; Line B (Rome Metro); Rome–Lido railway	2012	Rome; 41°52′02.2″N 12°29′00.0″E	Lazio	
51	Fiumarella Viaduct	125 m (410 ft)	525 m (1,722 ft)	Box girder Prestressed concrete 62+92+125+92+92+62	Strada statale 109bis Fiumarella		Catanzaro; 38°54′53.1″N 16°34′35.3″E	Calabria	
52	Gambellato Viaduct	124 m (407 ft)	267 m (876 ft)	Arch; Concrete deck arch	Autostrada A1; Gambellato Torrente	1960	Castiglione dei Pepoli; 44°06′35.8″N 11°13′39.3″E	Emilia-Romagna	
53	Rago Viaduct	122 m (400 ft)	400 m (1,300 ft)	Box girder Steel; 81+122+81; Twin bridges	Autostrada A2	1974	Morano Calabro; 39°52′44.9″N 16°07′48.2″E	Calabria	
54	Stupino Viaduct	120 m (390 ft) (x2)	635 m (2,083 ft)	Box girder Prestressed concrete	Autostrada A2; Stupino	1974	Carpanzano; 39°08′58.0″N 16°16′55.3″E	Calabria	
55	Del Rio Viaduct	120 m (390 ft)	610 m (2,000 ft)	Box girder Prestressed concrete 73+120+73	Autostrada A15	1975	Pontremoli; 44°25′19.7″N 9°52′52.2″E	Tuscany	
56	Roccaprebalza Viaduct (north)	120 m (390 ft) (x4)	624 m (2,047 ft)	Box girder Composite steel/concrete 4x120+71+43	Autostrada A15	2009	Roccaprebalza; 44°31′46.9″N 9°57′26.5″E	Emilia-Romagna	
57	Serra Cazzola I Viaduct	120 m (390 ft)	980 m (3,220 ft)	Beam; Composite steel/concrete deck 3x90+120+3x90	Strada statale 640	2014	Canicattì; 37°22′50.5″N 13°46′49.5″E	Sicily	
58	Val di Pai Bridge	118 m (387 ft)	118 m (387 ft)	Cable-stayed; Composite steel/concrete deck, inclined concrete pylon	Strada provinciale 7 Pai Torrente	2017	Pedesina; 46°04′42.1″N 9°32′49.8″E	Lombardy	
59	Serra Viaduct	117 m (384 ft) (x2)		Box girder Steel; Twin bridges	Autostrada A2	1973	Lagonegro; 40°07′38.6″N 15°46′31.8″E	Basilicata	
60	Noce Viaduct	116 m (381 ft)	749 m (2,457 ft)	Box girder Steel	Autostrada A2	2011	Lagonegro; 40°09′35.1″N 15°44′10.5″E	Basilicata	
61	Fragneto Viaduct	115 m (377 ft) (x6)	864 m (2,835 ft)	Box girder Steel; 87+6x115+87	Strada statale 95	1994	Brienza; 40°30′35.4″N 15°37′24.3″E	Basilicata	
62	Farma Viaduct (2017)	114 m (374 ft)	770 m (2,530 ft)	Beam; Steel; 65+112+114+104+65	Strada statale 223; Farma Torrente	2017	Civitella Paganico; 43°04′38.9″N 11°17′45.9″E	Tuscany	
63	Adriatic Bridge (Bari)	112 m (367 ft) (x2)	626 m (2,054 ft)	Cable-stayed; Composite steel/concrete deck, steel pylon	Road bridge Viale Giuseppe Tatarella	2016	Bari; 41°07′08.8″N 16°50′53.8″E	Apulia	
64	Malpertugio Viaduct	110 m (360 ft)	672 m (2,205 ft)	Box girder Prestressed concrete 61+5x110+61	Autostrada A20	1996	Sant'Ambrogio; 38°00′42.4″N 14°06′11.4″E	Sicily	
65	Francesco Colombo Viaduct	110 m (360 ft)	290 m (950 ft)	Truss; Steel; 90+110+90	A5 Motorway; Doire de Vény	2001	Courmayeur; 45°48′36.1″N 6°57′38.2″E	Aosta Valley	
66	Cesare Cantù Bridge	110 m (360 ft)	223 m (732 ft)	Cable-stayed; Concrete girder deck, concrete pylons 56+110+56	Strada provinciale 74; Adda	2009	Olginate - Calolziocorte; 45°47′02.2″N 9°26′05.5″E	Lombardy	
67	Leonardo Bridge	110 m (360 ft)	490 m (1,610 ft)	Arch; Steel tied-arch 30+110+77+43	Road bridge Arno; Autostrada A1	2014	Montevarchi; 43°31′34.3″N 11°35′33.2″E	Tuscany	
68	San Francesco di Paola Bridge	110 m (360 ft)	140 m (460 ft)	Cable-stayed; Steel box girder deck, inclined steel pylon	Road bridge Crati	2018	Cosenza; 39°17′54.1″N 16°15′36.2″E	Calabria	
69	Incoronata Viaduct	110 m (360 ft)	606 m (1,988 ft)	Box girder West: Prestressed concrete East: Steel; 55+110+55	Autostrada A2		Sicignano degli Alburni; 40°34′17.3″N 15°20′59.1″E	Campania	
70	Lupara Viaduct	110 m (360 ft)	232 m (761 ft)	Box girder Prestressed concrete 60+110+60	Autostrada A15		Genoa; 44°24′57.7″N 8°42′16.8″E	Liguria	
71	Vesima Viaduct	110 m (360 ft)	230 m (750 ft)	Box girder Prestressed concrete 60+110+60	Autostrada A15		Genoa; 44°25′09.9″N 8°42′48.0″E	Liguria	
72	Petroso Viaduct	110 m (360 ft)	150 m (490 ft)	Box girder Steel	Autostrada A2		Sicignano degli Alburni; 40°34′35.0″N 15°20′44.2″E	Campania	
73	Tiber Canal Bridge	107 m (351 ft)	293 m (961 ft)	Cable-stayed; Steel box girder deck, steel pylons	Aqueduct; Road bridge Tiber	1978	Rome; 41°57′39.9″N 12°30′11.4″E	Lazio	
74	Salle Bridge	105 m (344 ft)		Arch; Concrete deck arch	Strada provinciale 66; Orta	1956	Salle; 42°11′00.2″N 13°57′42.0″E	Abruzzo	
75	Arno River Bridge (Incisa)	104 m (341 ft)	235 m (771 ft)	Arch; Concrete deck arch Twin bridges	Autostrada A1; Arno	1962	Incisa in Val d'Arno; 43°40′33.0″N 11°27′12.5″E	Tuscany	
76	Nuovo Ponte di Mezzocammino	102 m (335 ft)	372 m (1,220 ft)	Box girder Steel; 67+102+67; Twin bridges	Grande Raccordo Anulare; Tiber		Rome; 41°48′28.1″N 12°25′05.1″E	Lazio	
77	Ponte del Risorgimento	100 m (330 ft)	159 m (522 ft)	Arch; Concrete deck arch	Road bridge Tiber	1911	Rome; 41°55′07.4″N 12°28′14.9″E	Lazio	
78	Sori Viaduct	100 m (330 ft)	392 m (1,286 ft)	Box girder Prestressed concrete	Autostrada A12; Sori	1969	Sori; 44°22′48.5″N 9°06′32.9″E	Liguria	
79	Carbone Viaduct	100 m (330 ft) (x5)	523 m (1,716 ft)	Box girder Prestressed concrete	Autostrada A20	1988	Cefalù; 38°00′45.8″N 14°03′34.9″E	Sicily	
80	Rio Canale Viaduct	100 m (330 ft)	336 m (1,102 ft)	Box girder Prestressed concrete 68+100+68	Strada provinciale 30; Lake Omodeo	1988	Tadasuni; 40°05′57.7″N 8°53′46.1″E	Sardinia	
81	Ramat Viaduct	100 m (330 ft) (x8)	920 m (3,020 ft)	Box girder Prestressed concrete Twin bridges	Autostrada A32	1992	Chiomonte; 45°07′05.4″N 6°58′15.5″E	Piedmont	
82	Marzo Viaduct	100 m (330 ft)	193 m (633 ft)	Box girder Prestressed concrete	Autostrada A20	1992	Cefalù; 38°00′48.2″N 14°04′38.4″E	Sicily	
83	Ponte Rosso (Albenga)	100 m (330 ft)	100 m (330 ft)	Arch; Steel tied-arch	Strada provinciale 39; Centa	1995	Albenga; 44°02′49.0″N 8°12′50.0″E	Liguria	
84	Buzza Viaduct	100 m (330 ft) (x10)	1,101 m (3,612 ft)	Box girder Prestressed concrete	Autostrada A20	2004	Caronia; 38°01′24.5″N 14°29′11.2″E	Sicily	
85	Fontanazza Viaduct	100 m (330 ft)	601 m (1,972 ft)	Box girder Prestressed concrete	Autostrada A20	2004	Caronia; 38°01′33.6″N 14°28′32.1″E	Sicily	
86	Tanaro Bridge (Costigliole d'Asti)	100 m (330 ft) (x3)	1,907 m (6,257 ft)	Box girder Prestressed concrete 50+3x100+50	Autostrada A33; Tanaro	2007	Costigliole d'Asti; 44°47′36.2″N 8°07′46.2″E	Piedmont	
87	Stura di Demonte I Viaduct	100 m (330 ft) (x10)	1,118 m (3,668 ft)	Beam; Composite steel/concrete deck 50+10x100+50	Autostrada A33; Stura di Demonte	2012	Cuneo; 44°25′23.3″N 7°34′24.7″E	Piedmont	
88	Belbo Torrente Bridge	100 m (330 ft) (x2)	427 m (1,401 ft)	Cable-stayed; Concrete box girder deck, concrete pylon	Variante ex SS456; Belbo Torrente	2013	Nizza Monferrato; 44°46′07.2″N 8°20′54.7″E	Piedmont	
89	Mulazzo Suspension Bridge	100 m (330 ft)	124 m (407 ft)	Suspension; Composite steel/concrete deck, steel (north) and concrete (south) pylons	Strada provinciale 32; Màngiola Torrente	2017	Mulazzo; 44°19′07.9″N 9°53′39.3″E	Tuscany	
90	San Giuliano Viaduct	100 m (330 ft)	380 m (1,250 ft)	Arch; Concrete deck arch	Autostrada A1		Nazzano; 42°12′43.1″N 12°36′03.7″E	Lazio	
91	Sos Cannalzos Viaduct	100 m (330 ft)	250 m (820 ft)	Box girder Steel; 75+100+75	Strada statale 597 and 729		Monti; 40°49′55.9″N 9°21′19.7″E	Sardinia	
92	Genoa-Saint George Bridge	100 m (330 ft) (x3)	1,067 m (3,501 ft)	Box girder Steel; 3x100	Autostrada A10; Polcevera	2020	Genoa; 44°25′34.6″N 8°53′17.0″E	Liguria	

== Planned bridges ==
Name	Span	Length	Type	Carries Crosses	Opened	Location	Region	Ref.
Strait of Messina Bridge project	3,300 m (10,800 ft)	5,070 m (16,630 ft)	Suspension; Steel dual-box girder bridge, steel pylons	2x3 highway lanes 2 railway lines Strait of Messina		Messina - Villa San Giovanni; 38°14′51.0″N 15°38′21.0″E	Sicily; Calabria	(Note: The Messina Bridge, which once belonged to the projects of the Trans-European Transport Network, saw its funding canceled by an amendment presented by the opposition and voted on October 27, 2011.)

== Notes and references ==
- Notes
- "Beni culturali" [Cultural heritage]. provincia.bz.it (in Italian). Provincia autonoma di Bolzano - Alto Adige.
- Nicolas Janberg. "International Database for Civil and Structural Engineering". Structurae.com.
- Others references

== See also ==
- List of bridges in Rome
- List of bridges in Venice
- List of Roman bridges
- List of aqueducts in the Roman Empire
- Transport in Italy
- Rail transport in Italy
- Autostrade of Italy
- State highway (Italy)
- Geography of Italy
- Italian architecture
