= Calatrava bridge =

Several bridges by the architect Santiago Calatrava are known locally as Calatrava bridge or Calatrava's bridge. These include:

- Ponte della Costituzione, Venice, Italy
- San Francesco di Paola Bridge, Cosenza, Italy
- Bac de Roda Bridge, Barcelona, Spain
- Calatrava Bridge, a multi-way bridge in Petah Tikva, Israel
- Chords Bridge, Jerusalem, Israel
- Katehaki Pedestrian Bridge, Athens, Greece
