= Platano Viaduct =

Two-hinged rigid-frame viaduct on the RA 5 in southern Italy

Platano Viaduct Viadotto Platano
- Coordinates: 40°36′54.6″N 15°27′15.6″E
- Carries: RA 5
- Crosses: Platano stream
- Locale: Romagnano al Monte (Salerno) – Vietri di Potenza (Potenza), Italy
- Maintained by: ANAS

Characteristics
- Design: Two-hinged rigid-frame with inclined legs; steel box-girder deck
- Material: Steel and concrete
- Total length: 630 m
- Longest span: 291 m
- Clearance below: 220 m (deck height)

History
- Designer: Silvano Zorzi; Sabatino Procaccia
- Opened: 1978

The Platano Viaduct (Italian: Viadotto Platano) is a two-hinged rigid-frame motorway bridge on the RA 5 between Romagnano al Monte and Vietri di Potenza in southern Italy. It spans the gorge of the Platano stream on the boundary between Campania and Basilicata. Opened in 1978, the bridge has a main span of about 291 m and a deck approximately 220 m above the valley floor, placing it among the highest road bridges in Italy. A technical report by Mapei describes it as the world's second-tallest rigid-frame bridge (220 m deck height).

== Design ==
The structure uses a steel box-girder deck carried by two inclined steel struts that form a two-hinged rigid frame with the adjacent reinforced-concrete piers. This strut-frame configuration (Italian: ponte a stampella) is characteristic of Italian long-span bridge design of the 1960s–1970s and is conceptually similar to the Sfalassà Viaduct.

The main opening of roughly 291 m is spanned by a steel box-girder deck; the approach spans are in reinforced or prestressed concrete. The viaduct carries two carriageways of the RA5 connector (European route E847).

== Construction ==
Engineers Silvano Zorzi and Sabatino Procaccia designed the bridge; it opened to traffic in 1978. Photo documentation indicates that large portions of the inclined struts were assembled on the roadway and then rotated or tilted into place over the gorge; the central steel deck was subsequently erected in shorter segments until closure at mid-span.

== Maintenance ==
The owner and maintainer is ANAS. In 2020–2021, concrete repair and protection works were carried out on the structure; the technical report notes the deck height (≈220 m) and credits the original design to Zorzi and Procaccia.

== Dimensions ==
- Total length: ~630 m.
- Main span: ~291 m.
- Deck height: ~220 m above the valley floor.

== See also ==
- Sfalassà Viaduct
- List of bridges in Italy
- List of highest bridges
