= Ponte della Libertà (Pavia) =

Bridge that runs over the Ticino River in Italy

Ponte della Libertà "Liberty Bridge"
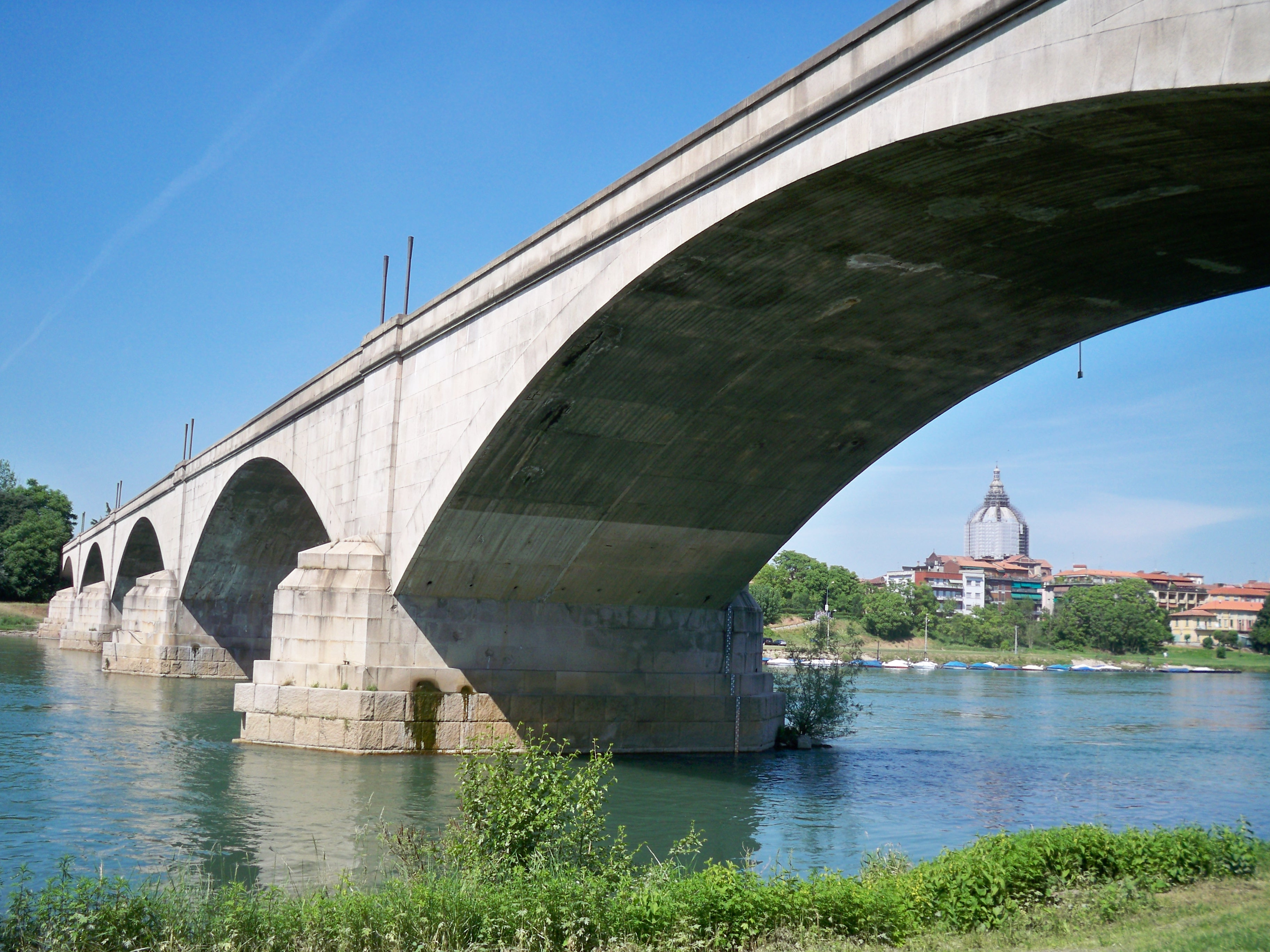
- The bridge, as seen in 2009
- Coordinates: 45°10′50″N 9°08′47″E
- Crosses: Ticino river
- Locale: Lombardy, Italy

Characteristics
- Design: Arched bridge
- Material: Reinforced concrete and granite
- Total length: 225 meters
- No. of lanes: 3

Location
- Interactive map of Ponte della Libertà

The Ponte della Libertà (called Ponte dell'Impero until 1947, a name still informally used today) is a concrete bridge that runs over the Ticino river, which connects the northern and southern banks of the river near Pavia. The bridge was opened to traffic in 1936.

== Description and history ==
The bridge consists of five arches of 45 meters of span each and is made of reinforced concrete covered with gray Baveno granite. From an architectural point of view it belongs to Italian rationalism. It was built between 1934 and 1936 to ease the traffic of vehicles crossing Pavia and its covered bridge on the route between Milan and Genoa. The construction area also raised some doubts, as it was still considered too much within the city territory.

On September 4 and 5, 1944 the bridge was bombed, resulting in the destruction of the southern arch, which was however quickly rebuilt by the Germans retreating from Italy. In 1947 the repair of the bridge was completed and it was renamed with its current name. In 2014, a night lighting system with blue and pink lights was installed on the bridge, designed by the artist Marco Lodola.

== See also ==
- List of bridges in Italy
- Pons Cestius
