= Castello di Salle =

Coordinates: 42.1668°N 13.9587°E

Castle of Salle
- Castello di Salle
- Salle
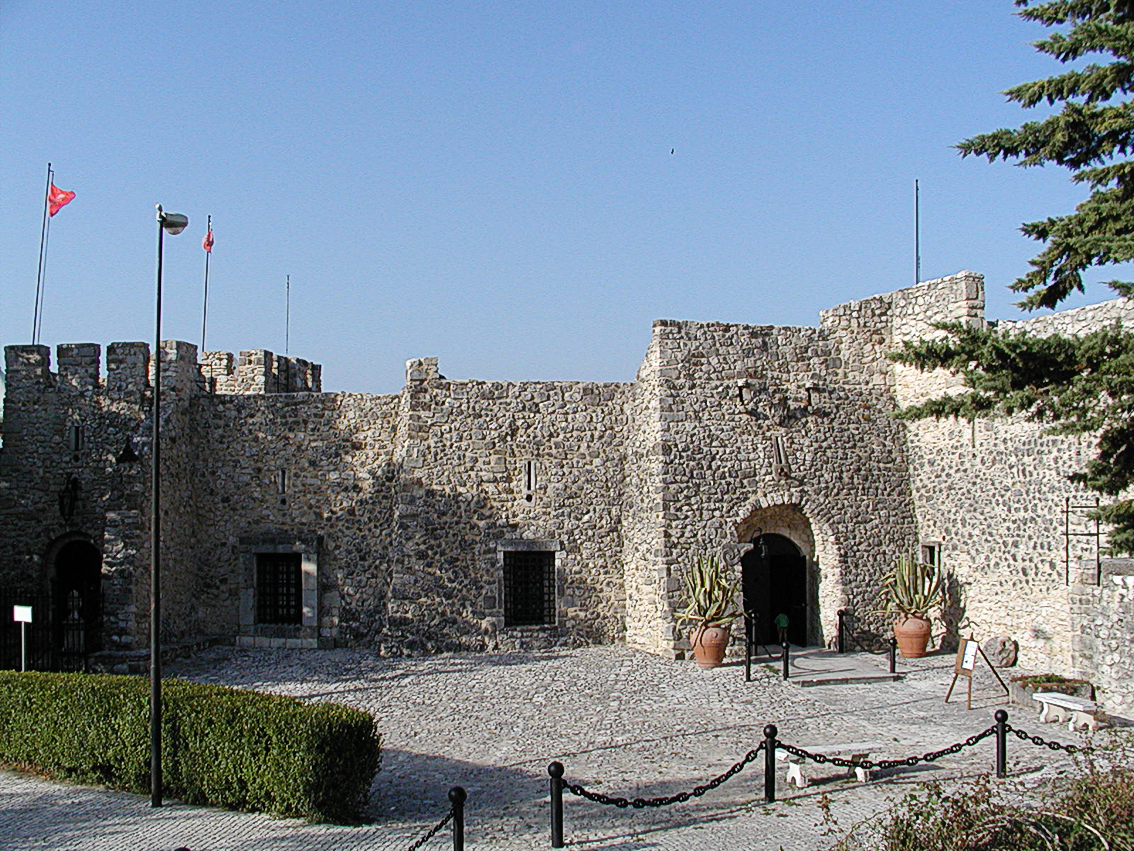
- Castle in Serramonacesca

Site information
- Type: Castle

Location

Site history
- Built: 10th century

Castello di Salle (Italian for Castle of Salle) is a Middle Ages castle in Salle, Province of Pescara, Abruzzo, Italy.

== History ==
The origins of the castle, erected as a fief of the Abbey of San Clemente a Casauria, date back to before the 11th century. The primary function of the castle was defensive, and only from the 16th century, with its passage to the Kingdom of Naples, did it become the residence of the families that succeeded in its ownership, such as the Colonna and Gonzaga D'Aquino.

In 1646, the castle became the property of Baron Giacinto de Genua (Di Genova), from Vasto, who radically transformed it to adapt it into a noble palace, which today belongs to the Mechi family.

Around the palace, the ruins of the village of Old Salle, destroyed by the earthquake of 1915, are visible.

== Architecture ==
The structure of the castle has an irregular L-shaped plan and is covered by a terrace with a crenellated parapet from which three towers rise. The internal courtyard of the building hosts an Italian garden, and in front of the main entrance, there is a fountain from the 1500s.

Half of the main northeast wing is occupied by the church of Blessed Roberto da Salle and has two entrances. The main facade on the north side has three entrances topped by loopholes. This area houses the Bourbon Medieval Museum, with an exhibition of fabrics, weapons, torture instruments, paintings, maps, sacred vestments, as well as both ancient and modern images of Salle.
