= Perarolo di Cadore =

- Comune
- Comune di Perarolo di Cadore
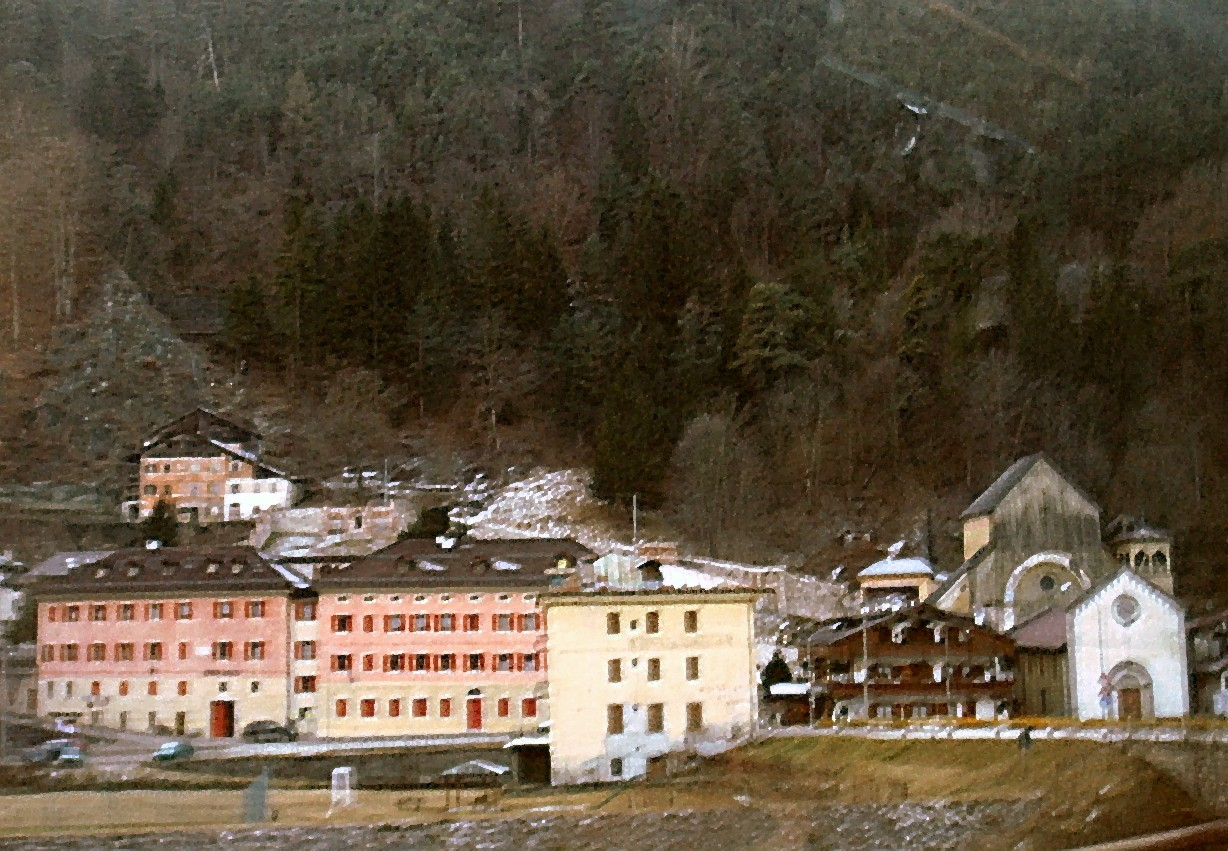

- Location within Italy Location within Veneto
- Coordinates: 46°24′N 12°21′E
- Country: Italy
- Region: Veneto
- Province: Belluno (BL)
- Frazioni: Caralte, Fontanelle, Macchietto, Peron

Government
  - Mayor: Ruggero Lollato

Area
  - Total: 43.6 km^{2} (16.8 sq mi)
- Elevation: 532 m (1,745 ft)

Population (Dec. 2004)
  - Total: 363
  - Density: 8.33/km^{2} (21.6/sq mi)
- Demonym: Perarolesi
- Time zone: UTC+1 (CET)
  - Summer (DST): UTC+2 (CEST)
- Postal code: 32010
- Dialing code: 0435

Perarolo di Cadore is a comune (municipality) in the Province of Belluno in the Italian region of Veneto, located about 110 kilometres (68 mi) north of Venice and about 30 kilometres (19 mi) northeast of Belluno.

The Cadore Viaduct is nearby on the Strada statale 51 di Alemagna (SS51).

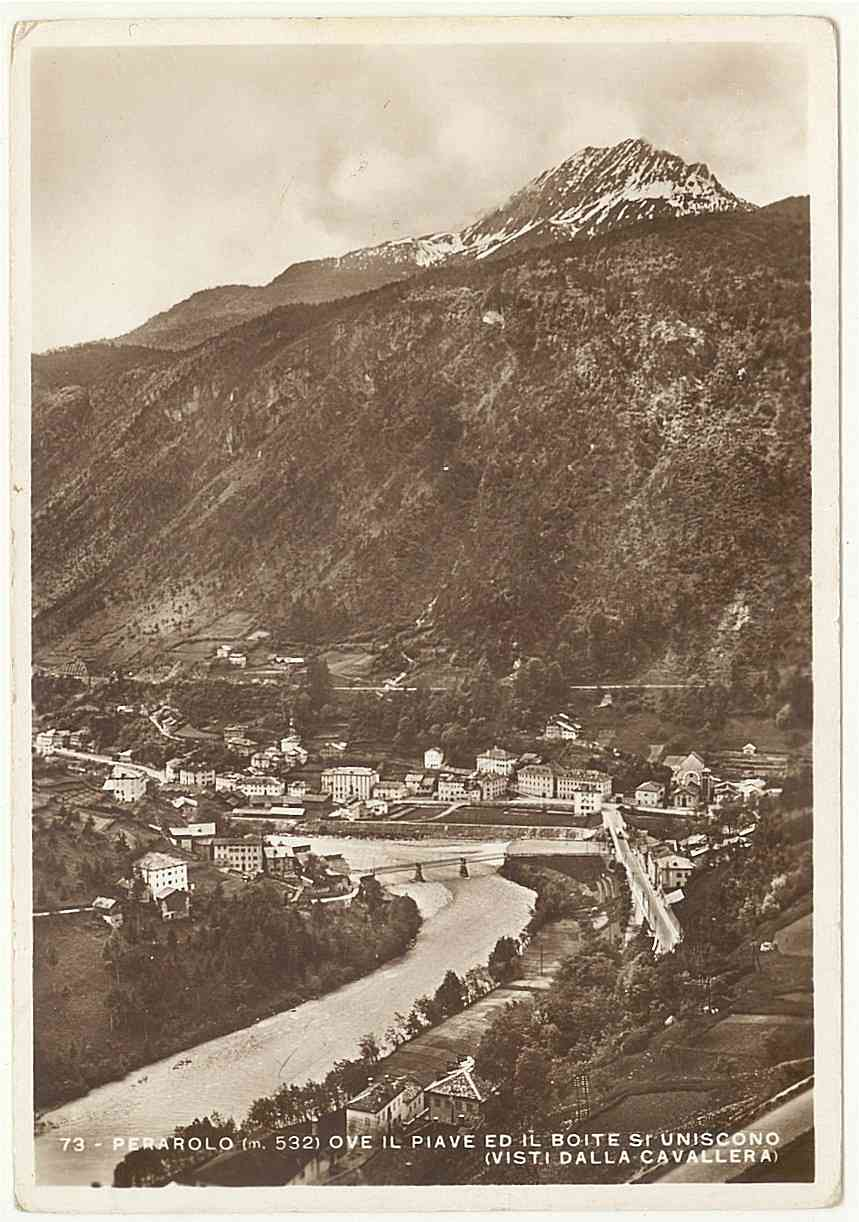
Perarolo in 1941
