= Cadore Viaduct =

Cadore Viaduct Ponte Cadore, Piave River Viaduct
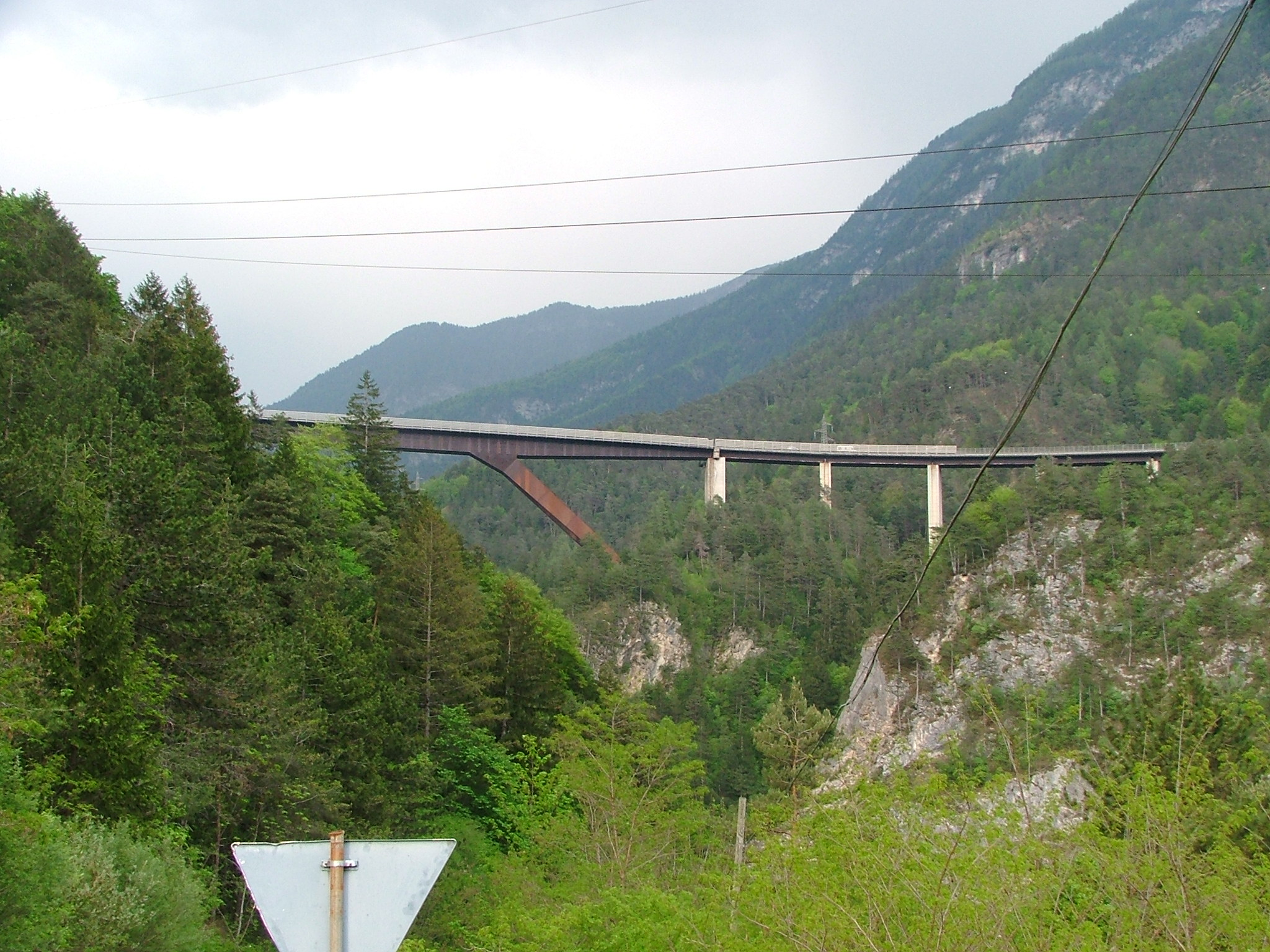
- View in April 2007
- Coordinates: 46.403°N 12.372°E
- Carries: SS51 Alemagna State Road
- Crosses: Piave (river)
- Locale: Perarolo di Cadore, Province of Belluno, Veneto, north-east Italy

Characteristics
- Design: Rigid strut frame bridge
- Material: Reinforced concrete and steel
- Total length: 535 m (1,755 ft)
- Width: 13.3 m (44 ft)
- Height: 184 m (604 ft)
- Longest span: 255 m (837 ft)

History
- Engineering design by: Matildi + Partners
- Constructed by: Mazzi Impresa Generale Costruzioni S.p.A., Verona
- Fabrication by: Cimolai Costruzioni Metalliche, Pordenone (Steel)
- Construction start: 1982
- Opened: 1985

Location
- Interactive map of Cadore Viaduct

The Cadore Viaduct is a road bridge in Italy, in the southern Alps.

== History ==
=== Design ===
The main span is held up by two 85m steel struts.

=== Construction ===
It was built by longitudinal launching, by Mazzi. It opened in 1985.

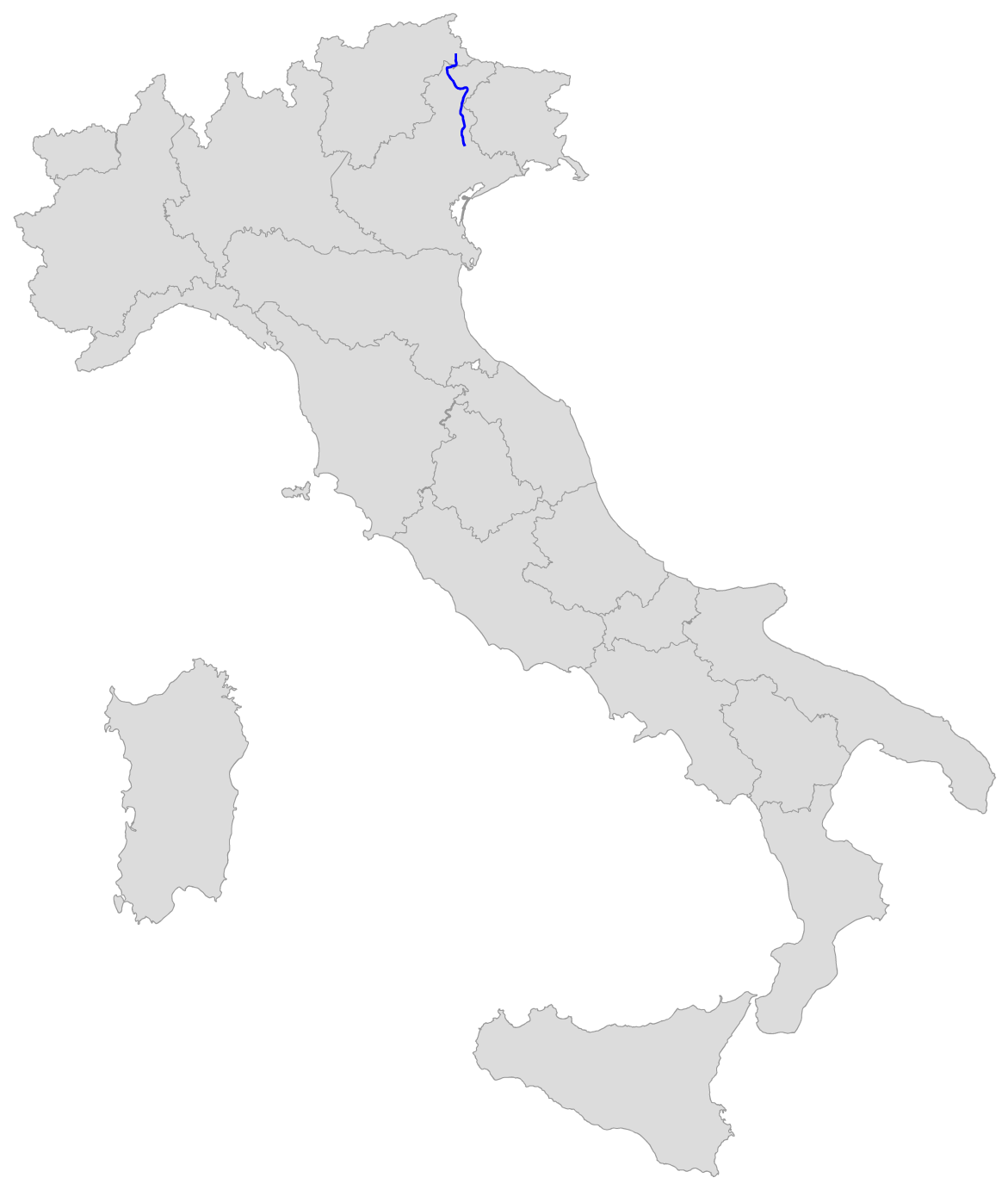
Route of SS51

== Structure ==
The bridge is north of the northern terminus of the Autostrada A27 at Ponte nelle Alpi (Bridge into the Alps). The road is the SS51 Strada statale di Alemagna, maintained by ANAS, which to the north passes Tre Cime di Lavaredo. The route joins to become part of European route E66. It reaches Austria near Innichen in South Tyrol, also known as Trentino-Alto Adige/Südtirol. It enters Austria at East Tyrol.

To the north is Calalzo di Cadore. The Calalzo–Padua railway passes under the bridge. The former Dolomites Railway passed nearby to the north, around one mile away. The Slovenian capital of Ljubljana is eighty miles to the east.

== See also ==
- List of highest bridges
- Sfalassà Viaduct, built 1974
