= San Francesco di Paola Bridge =

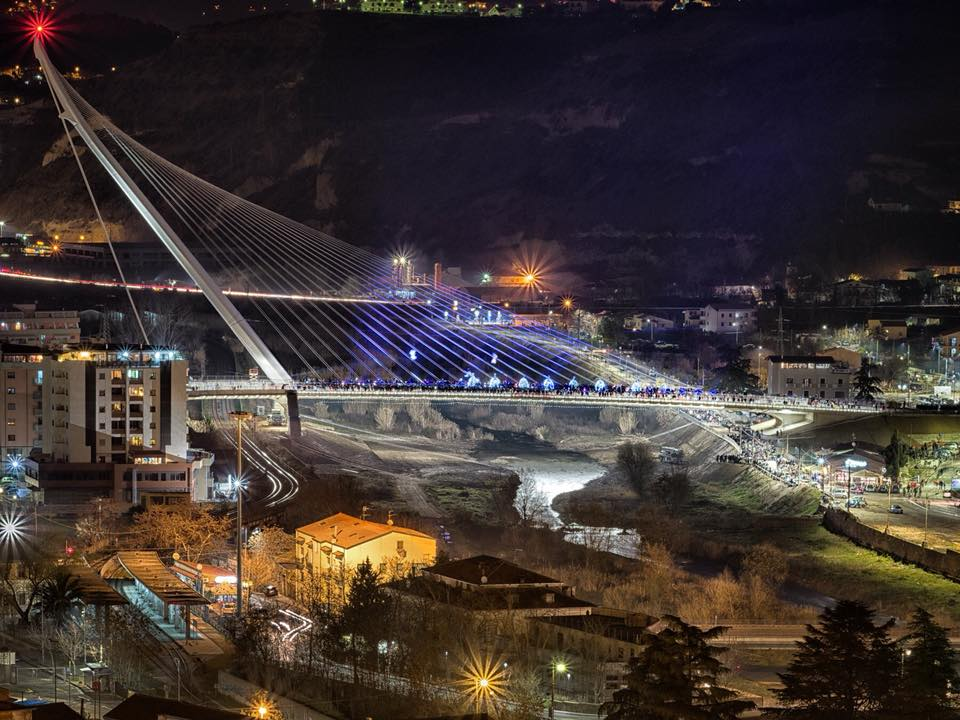
- The bridge at night, from central Cosenza
- Coordinates: 39.2984°N 16.2603°E
- Crosses: River Crati
- Locale: Cosenza, Italy
- Named for: St. Francis of Paola

Characteristics
- Design: Cable-stayed bridge
- Material: Steel; concrete; stone
- Total length: 140 metres (460 ft)
- Height: 104 metres (341 ft)

History
- Designer: Santiago Calatrava
- Construction start: 2017
- Construction end: 2018
- Construction cost: €20 million
- Inaugurated: 26 January 2018

Location
- Interactive map of San Francesco di Paola Bridge

The San Francesco di Paola Bridge or Cosenza Bridge is a road bridge in Cosenza, Italy, designed by Spanish architect Santiago Calatrava.

== Description ==
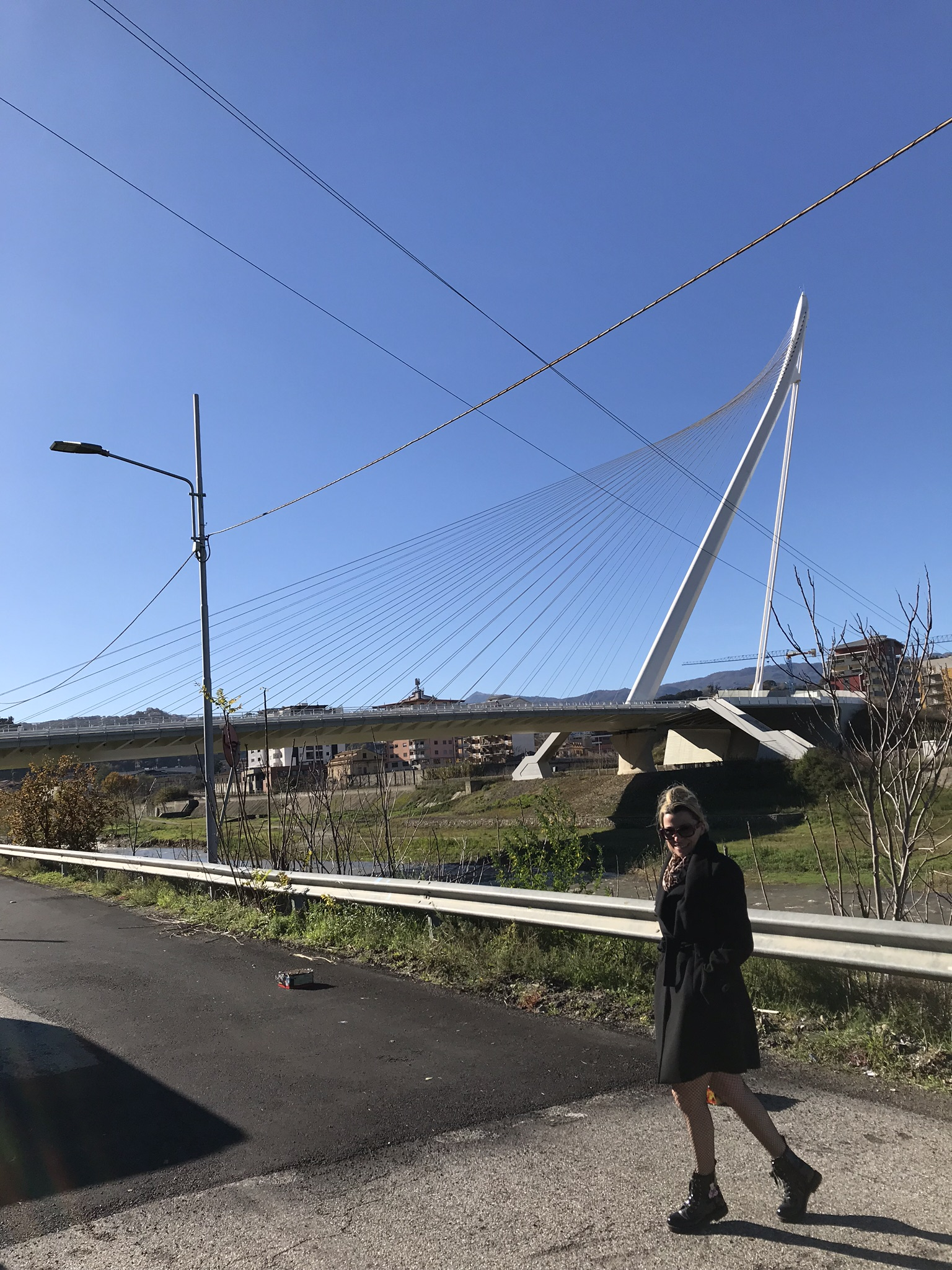
Another view of Calatrava Bridge.

The bridge spans the River Crati to connect two neighbourhoods in Cosenza, Contrada Gergeri and Via Reggio Calabria. It was first planned in 2004 and was built as part of a regional regeneration programme at a cost of approximately €20 million, paid for in part by the Gescal government programme, which was originally intended to build housing. It was inaugurated on 26 January 2018.

Calatrava's design is a cable-stayed bridge, reportedly the tallest in Europe, with a single pylon inclined at a 52° angle, reminiscent of a harp, which rises 82 metres (269 ft) above the roadbed and points towards the centre of the city. It is built of steel, concrete, and stone, and provides for future construction of a steel and glass enclosure to shelter pedestrians. The lighting design by Zumtobel Group uses LEDs.

== See also ==
- List of bridges in Italy
