= Ponte Buriano =

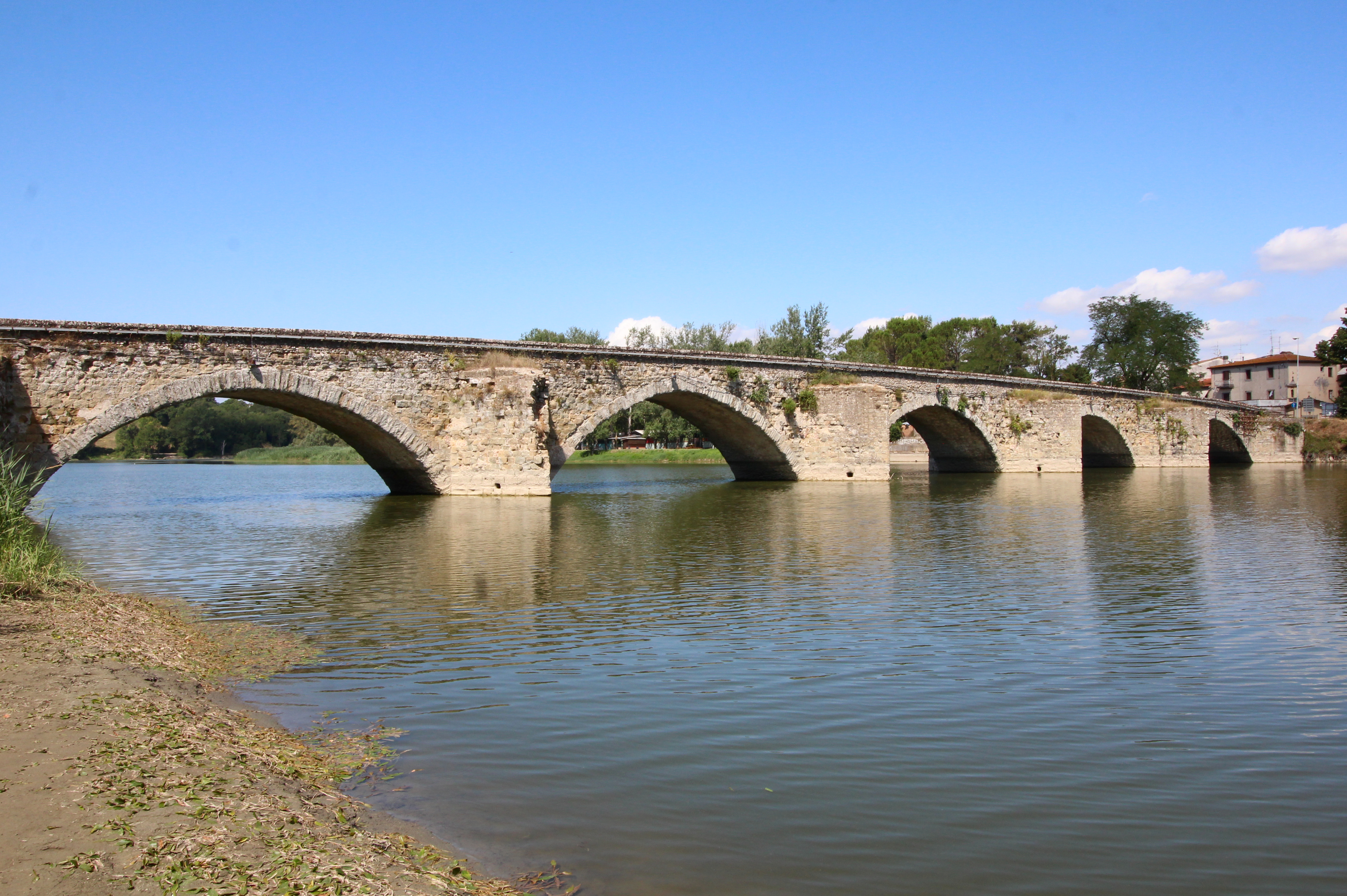
- Coordinates: 43.50456°N 11.799606°E
- Carries: vehicular traffic
- Crosses: River Arno
- Locale: Tuscany

Characteristics
- Design: arch bridge
- Material: Stone
- No. of spans: 7

History
- Construction end: 1277

The Ponte Buriano is a 1277 stone seven-arch bridge that is located north of the town of Arezzo in the Tuscany region of central Italy. Some references tell that the bridge was used by Leonardo da Vinci in the lower-right quadrant of his painting Mona Lisa.
