= Salle, Abruzzo =

Salle
- Comune
- Comune di Salle
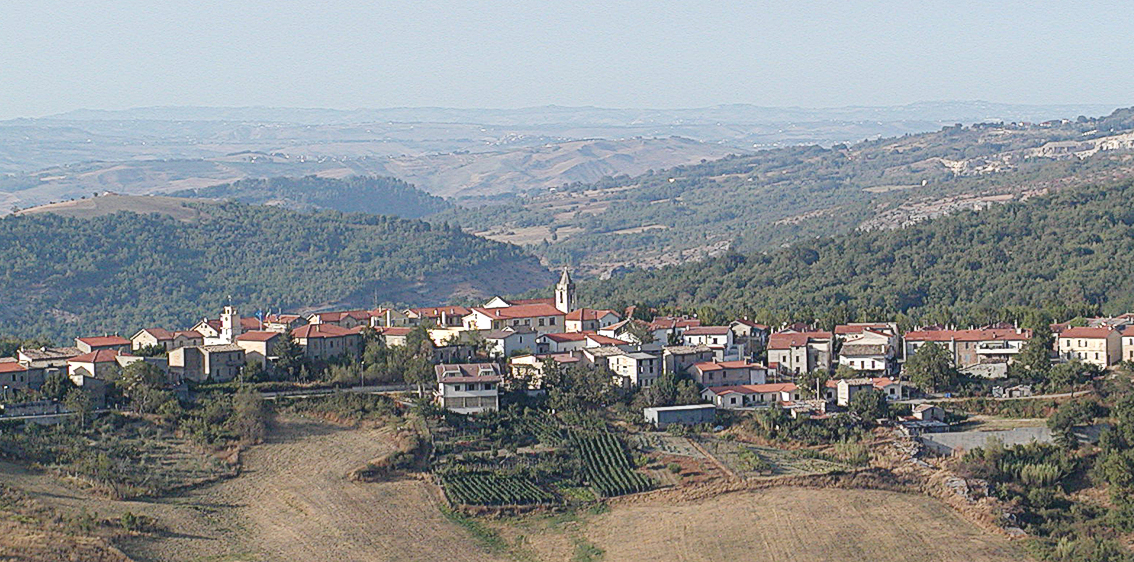
- View of Salle

- Location within Italy Location within Abruzzo
- Coordinates: 42°11′N 13°58′E
- Country: Italy
- Region: Abruzzo
- Province: Pescara (PE)
- Frazioni: Salle Nuova

Area
  - Total: 21 km^{2} (8.1 sq mi)
- Elevation: 450 m (1,480 ft)

Population (1 January 2007)
  - Total: 304
  - Density: 14/km^{2} (37/sq mi)
- Demonym: Sallesi
- Time zone: UTC+1 (CET)
  - Summer (DST): UTC+2 (CEST)
- Postal code: 65020
- Dialing code: 085
- ISTAT code: 068036
- Patron saint: Beato Roberto
- Saint day: 18 July
- Website: Official website

Salle is a comune and town in the province of Pescara in the Abruzzo region of Italy, well known for its castle and its history in the violin-string industry.

== History ==
The village was built in the 9th century at the same time as Caramanico Terme. The old part of the town, referred to as Salle vecchia, was hit by an earthquake in 1915 and later a landslide in 1933. The current town lies nearby, with much of the old town still abandoned. Salle is mentioned in the Chronicon Casauriense by the end of the 10th century and in 1191 was included as one of the 72 castles controlled by the monastery of San Clemente a Casauria.

== Places of Interest ==
- Castello di Salle
- Chiesa nuova di San Salvatore
- Ponte di Salle
