= Ponte degli Scalzi =

Bridge over the Grand Canal, Venice

Ponte degli Scalzi Ponte dei Scalsi
- Coordinates: 45°26′28″N 12°19′22″E
- Crosses: Grand Canal
- Locale: Venice, Italy
- Other name(s): Ponte della Stazione, Ponte della Ferrovia
- Named for: Chiesa degli Scalzi

Characteristics
- Design: Single-arch bridge
- Material: Istrian stone
- Total length: 40 m
- Height: 6.75 m (above water)
- Longest span: 40 m

History
- Designer: Eugenio Miozzi
- Construction cost: 2.55 million lire
- Opened: 1934
- Inaugurated: 28 October 1934
- Replaces: 1858 Austrian iron bridge

Location
- Interactive map of Ponte degli Scalzi

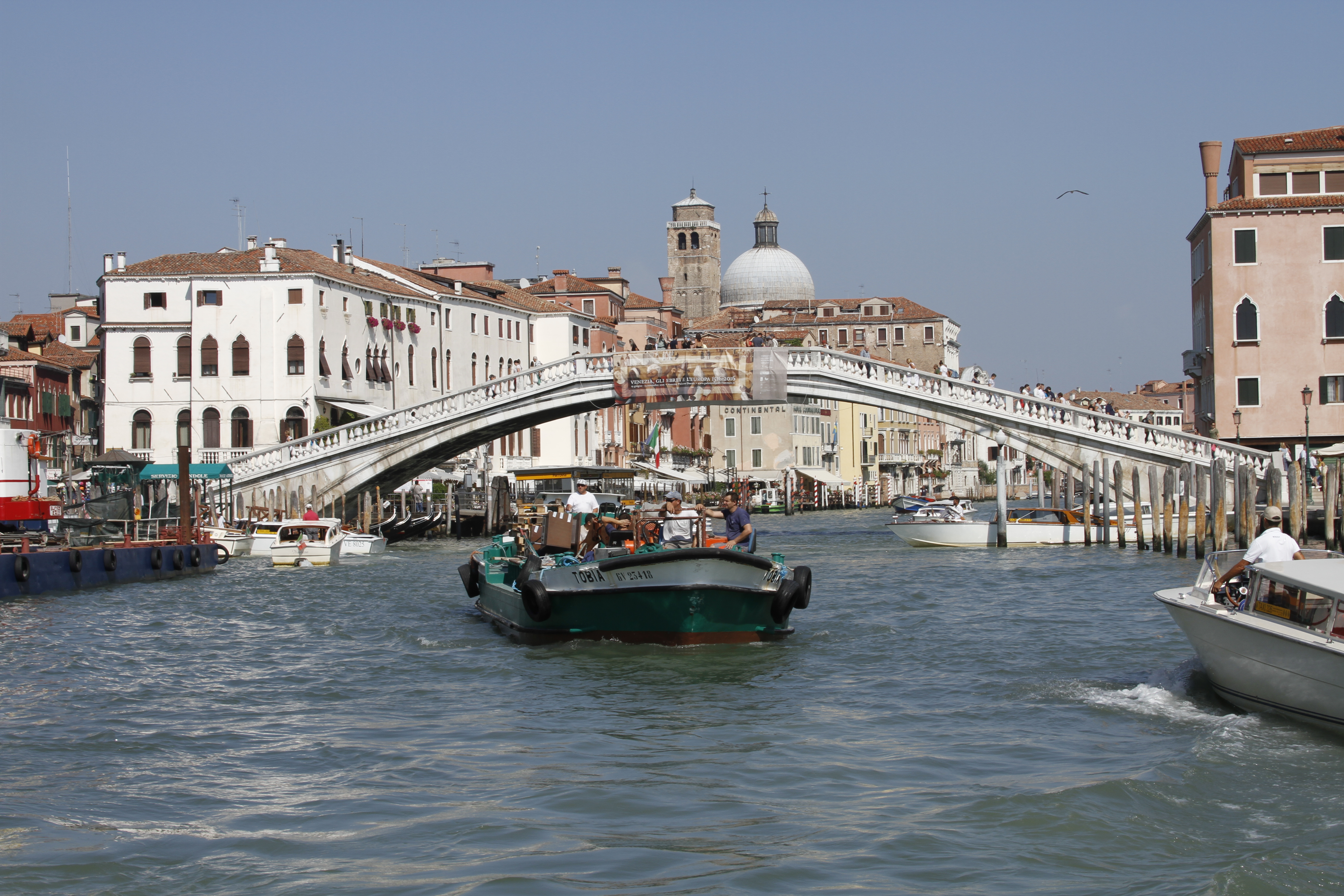
Ponte degli Scalzi

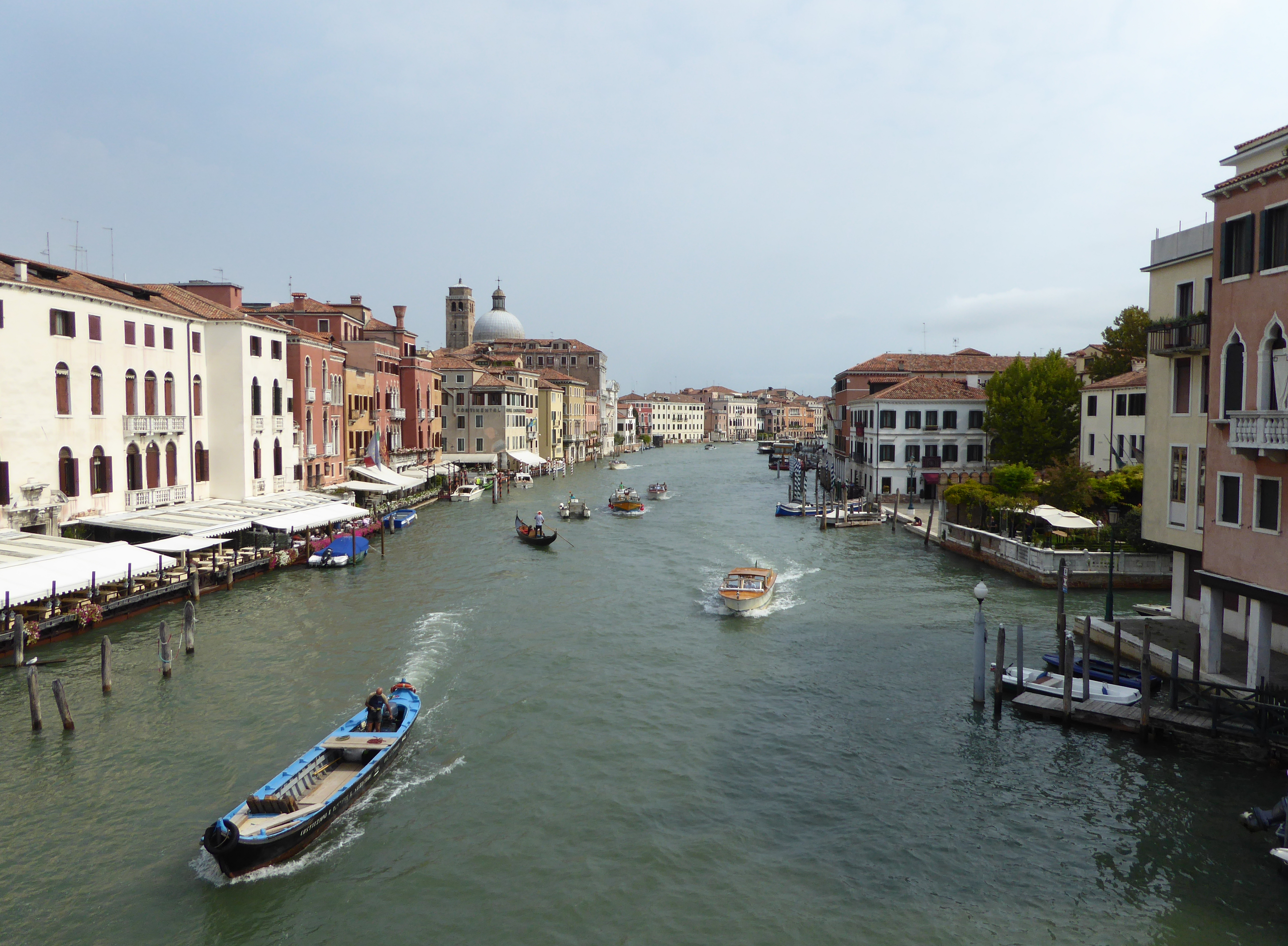
View of the Grand Canal from the bridge

The Ponte degli Scalzi (or Ponte dei Scalsi, in Venetian; literally, "bridge of the barefoot [monks]"), is one of only four bridges in Venice to span the Grand Canal.

The bridge connects the sestieri of Santa Croce and Cannaregio. On the north side, Cannaregio, are the Chiesa degli Scalzi (Church of the Barefoot or Discalced Monks) and the Santa Lucia (Ferrovia) railway station. The south side is the sestiere of Santa Croce.

Designed by Eugenio Miozzi, it was completed in 1934, replacing an Austrian iron bridge. It is a stone arch bridge.

Ponte degli Scalzi is located close to the site of construction of the fourth bridge over the Grand Canal, popularly known as Ponte di Calatrava although it was formally inaugurated as the Ponte della Costituzione. Construction was delayed in part due to controversy over its modern style, but the basic span was finally in place on August 11, 2007, and the bridge was opened for public use on September 11, 2008. This bridge is closer to the bus station than the Scalzi bridge.
