= Ponte delle Torri =

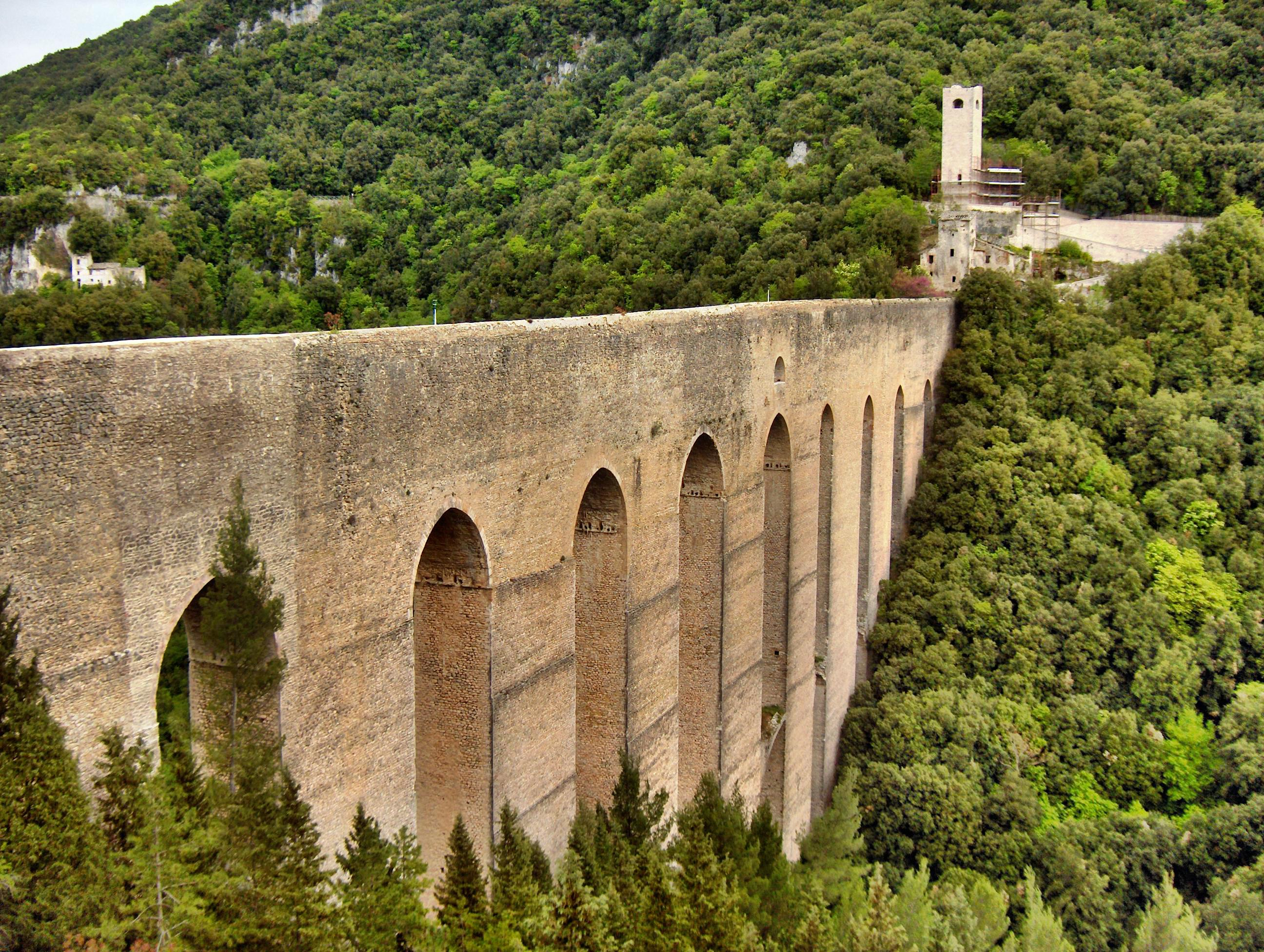
- Coordinates: 42°43′59″N 12°44′37″E
- Crosses: Tessino
- Locale: Spoleto, Umbria, Italy

Characteristics
- Design: Arch bridge
- Material: Stone
- Total length: 230 m
- Width: 80 m

Location
- Interactive map of Ponte delle Torri

The Ponte delle Torri is an arch bridge derived from a Roman aqueduct situated in the town of Spoleto.

== Description ==
At the two ends of the bridge there are two fortresses, the Rocca Albornoziana and the Fortilizio dei Mulini, built to guard the bridge and active as a mill until the 19th century. The name Ponte delle Torri could allude to the towers of the two fortresses or to the appearance of the pylons.

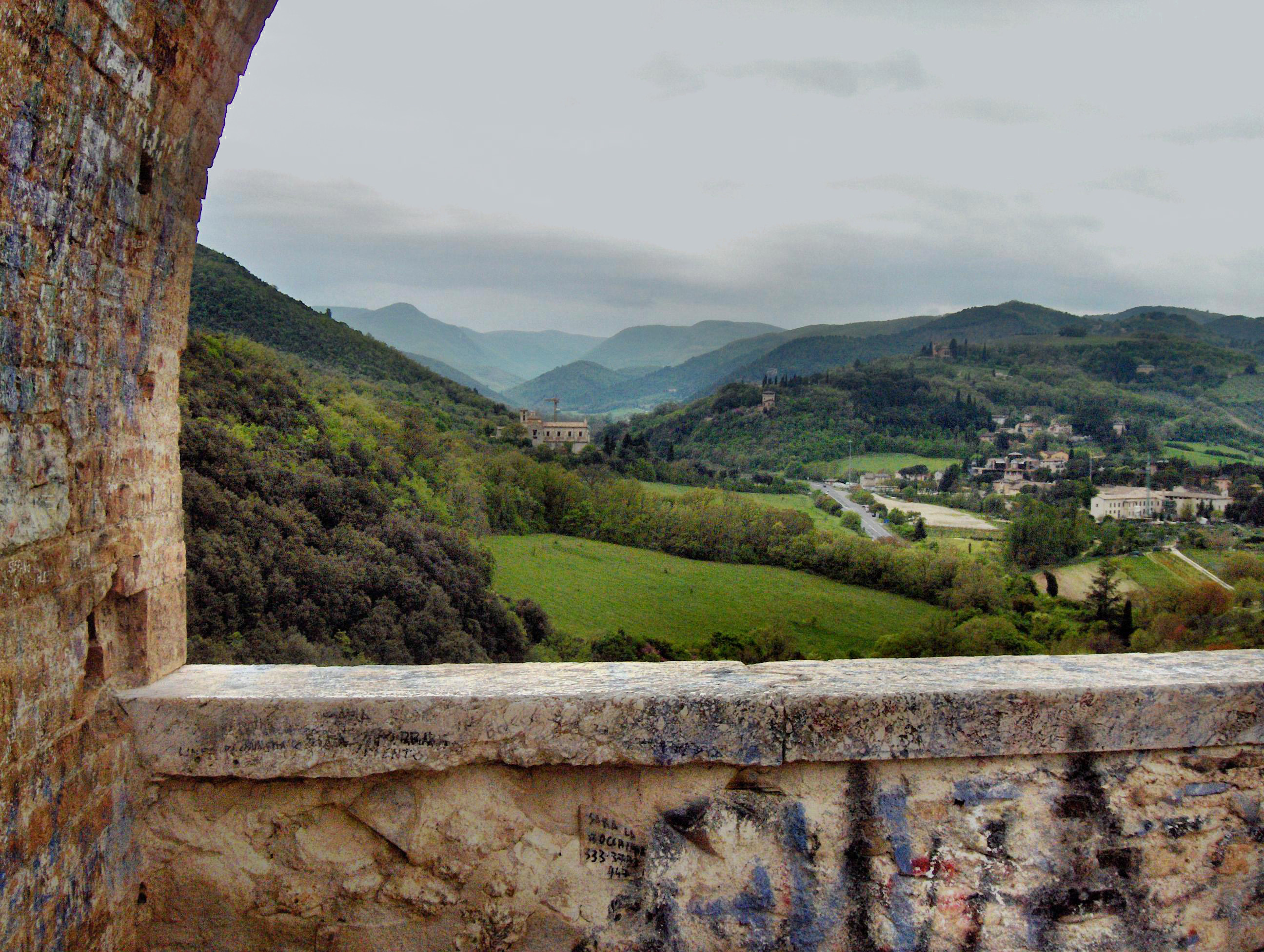
Panoramic view

A recess in the wall, a niche formerly used to monitor the aqueduct, also had other uses: when the city of Spoleto had the customs wall made up of medieval walls, it was used as a customs officer's guardhouse.

== History ==
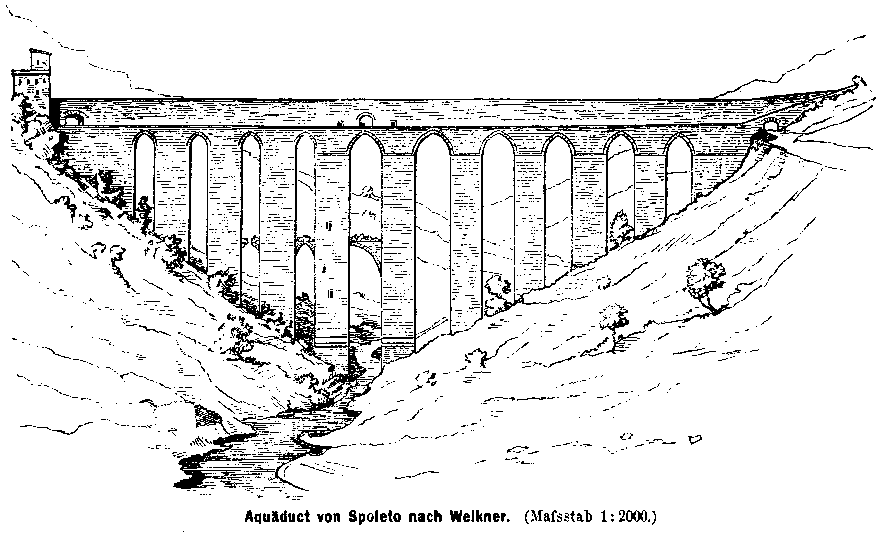
Spoleto Aqueduct, 1881 map

Over time it has been the subject of restorations and renovations: some arches, demolished for strategic reasons in 1390, were rebuilt in masonry in 1639, while two others were rebuilt in brick in 1845.

== In Literature ==
Over the centuries, the bridge has always fascinated travelers and important historical figures. The earliest mention of the medieval bridge is in the poem Dittamondo by Fazio degli Uberti, in book III, chapter X, written between 1346 and 1367.
