= Ponte Vecchio, Cesena =

Oldest bridge in Cesena, Italy

Coordinates: 44°08′02″N 12°14′01″E

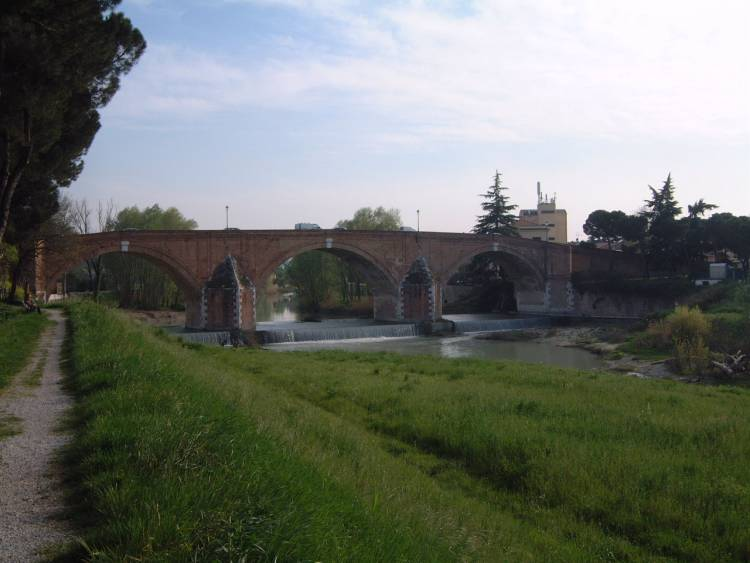
The Ponte Vecchio

The Ponte Vecchio (Old Bridge) also known as the Ponte Clemente, is the oldest bridge in Cesena and a symbol of the city. The bridge spans the River Savio, at one of its narrowest points. Construction work began around 1733 on the order of Pope Clement XII.
