= Ponte di Varlungo =

Bridge in Florence, Italy

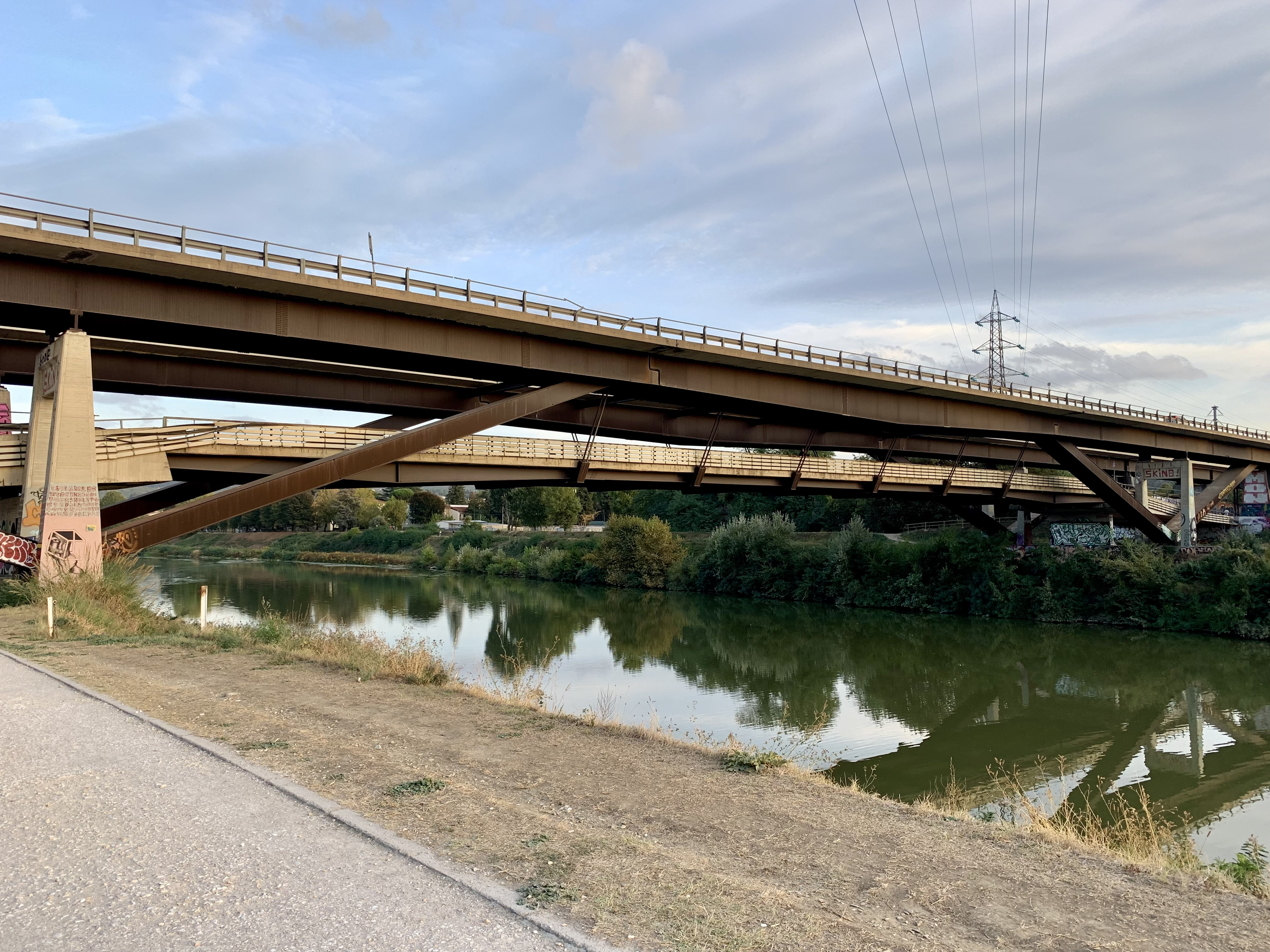
- Coordinates: 43°45′49″N 11°18′14″E
- Crosses: Arno
- Locale: Florence, Tuscany, Italy

Characteristics
- Material: Steel, reinforced concrete
- Total length: 375 m (1,230 ft)
- Height: 18 m (59 ft)
- Longest span: 127 m (417 ft)

History
- Architect: Adriano Montemagni
- Designer: Luciano Scali
- Construction start: 1979
- Construction end: 1981

Location
- Interactive map of Ponte di Varlungo

The Ponte di Varlungo is a bridge in Florence, Italy.

== History ==
Construction lasted from 1979 to 1981. The project was designed by engineer Luciano Scali and architect Adriano Montemagni.

== Description ==
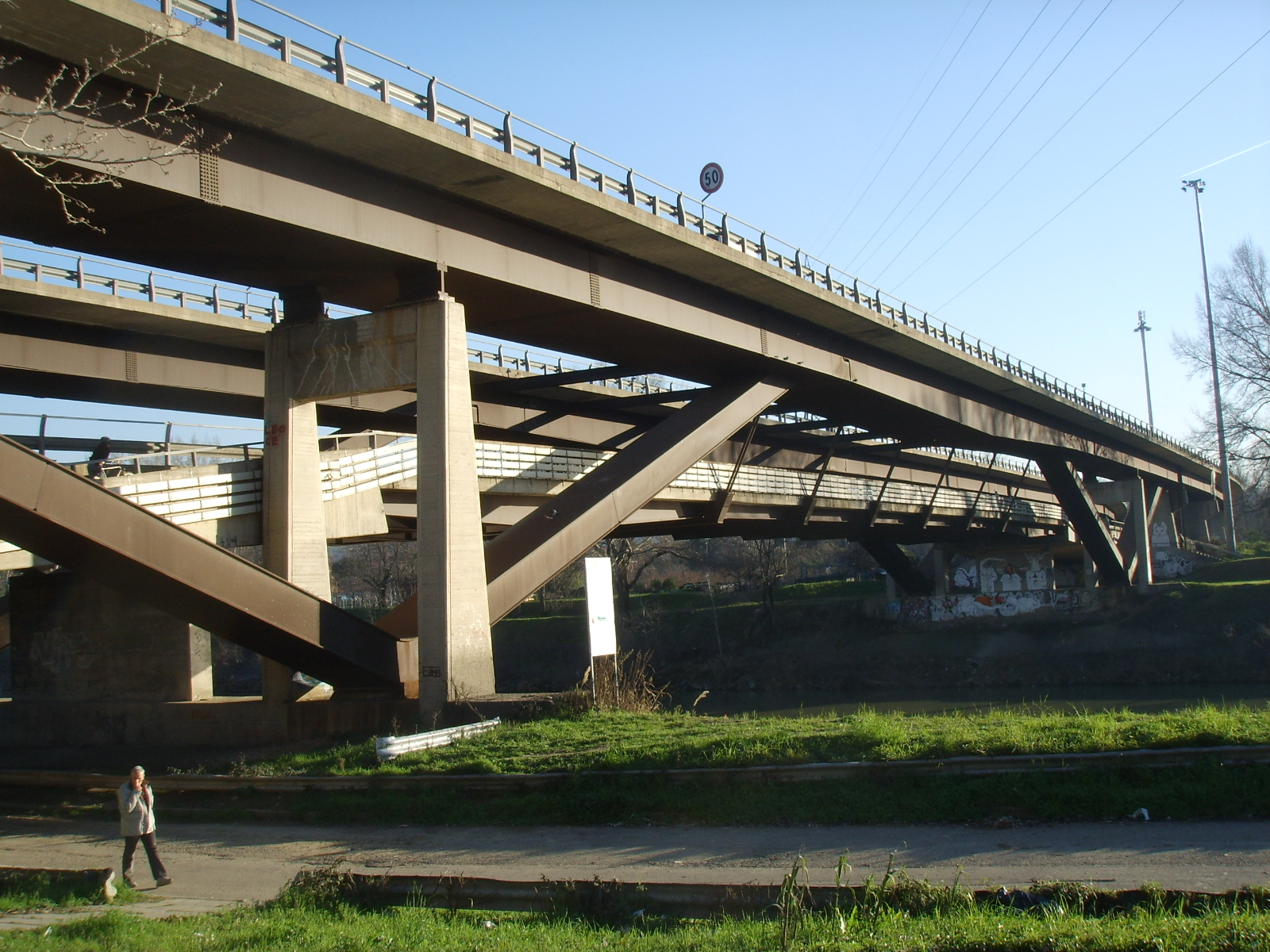
Detail of the bridge structure

The bridge was constructed with steel and reinforced concrete. The length of the bridge is 375 metres (1,230 ft), with a height of 18 metres (59 ft) and a span of 127 metres (417 ft).

== Marco Polo Street ==
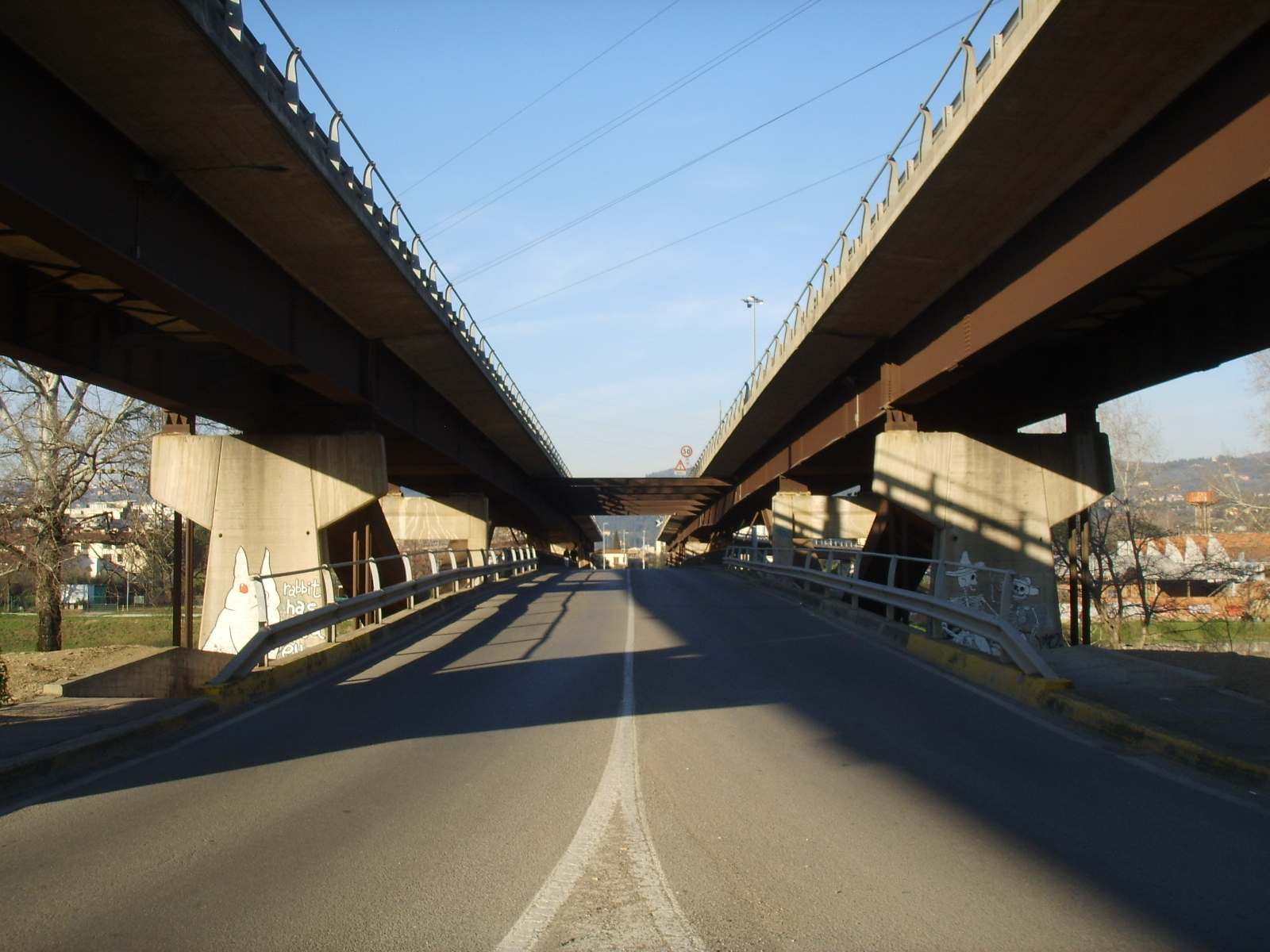
The Giovanni Falcone and Paolo Borsellino bridges on the sides, the two-lane carriageway in the centre

The road on the bridge is classified as a secondary extra-urban road, with a speed limit of 70 km/h. Along the route, there are two speed cameras managed by the municipality of Florence.
