= Ponte della Costituzione =

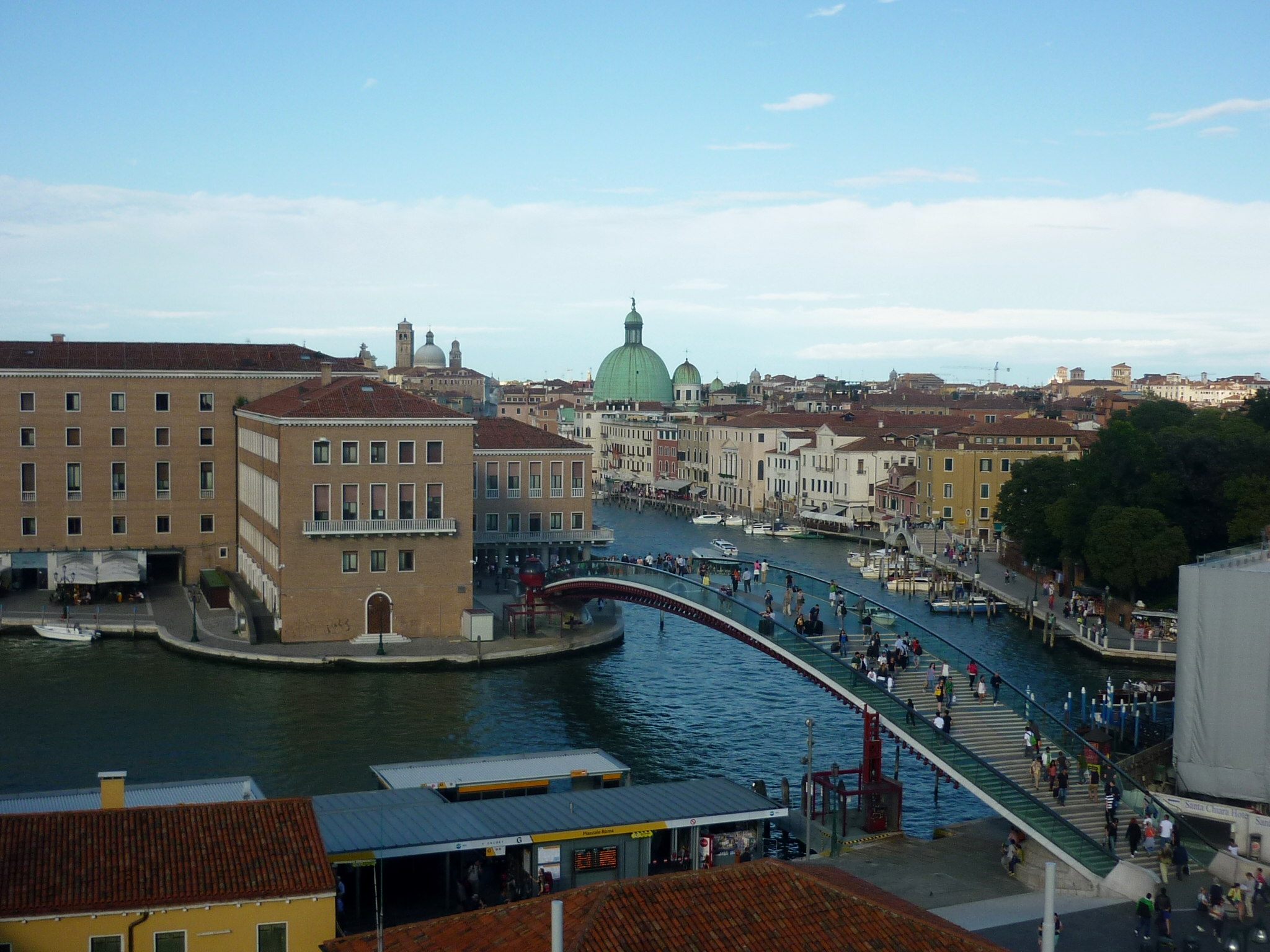
- Coordinates: 45.4389°N 12.3194°E
- Crosses: Grand Canal
- Locale: Venice
- Maintained by: Municipality of Venice

Characteristics
- Design: arched truss bridge
- Material: Steel with concrete abutments clad in pietra d'Istria and glass
- Width: varies from 17.68 metres (58.0 ft) to 9.38 metres (30.8 ft)
- Longest span: 79.72 metres (261.5 ft) (between abutments)
- Clearance below: 7.04 metres (23.1 ft) (at high tide)

History
- Designer: Santiago Calatrava
- Construction start: June 1999 (proposal)
- Opened: September 11, 2008; 17 years ago

Location
- Interactive map of Ponte della Costituzione

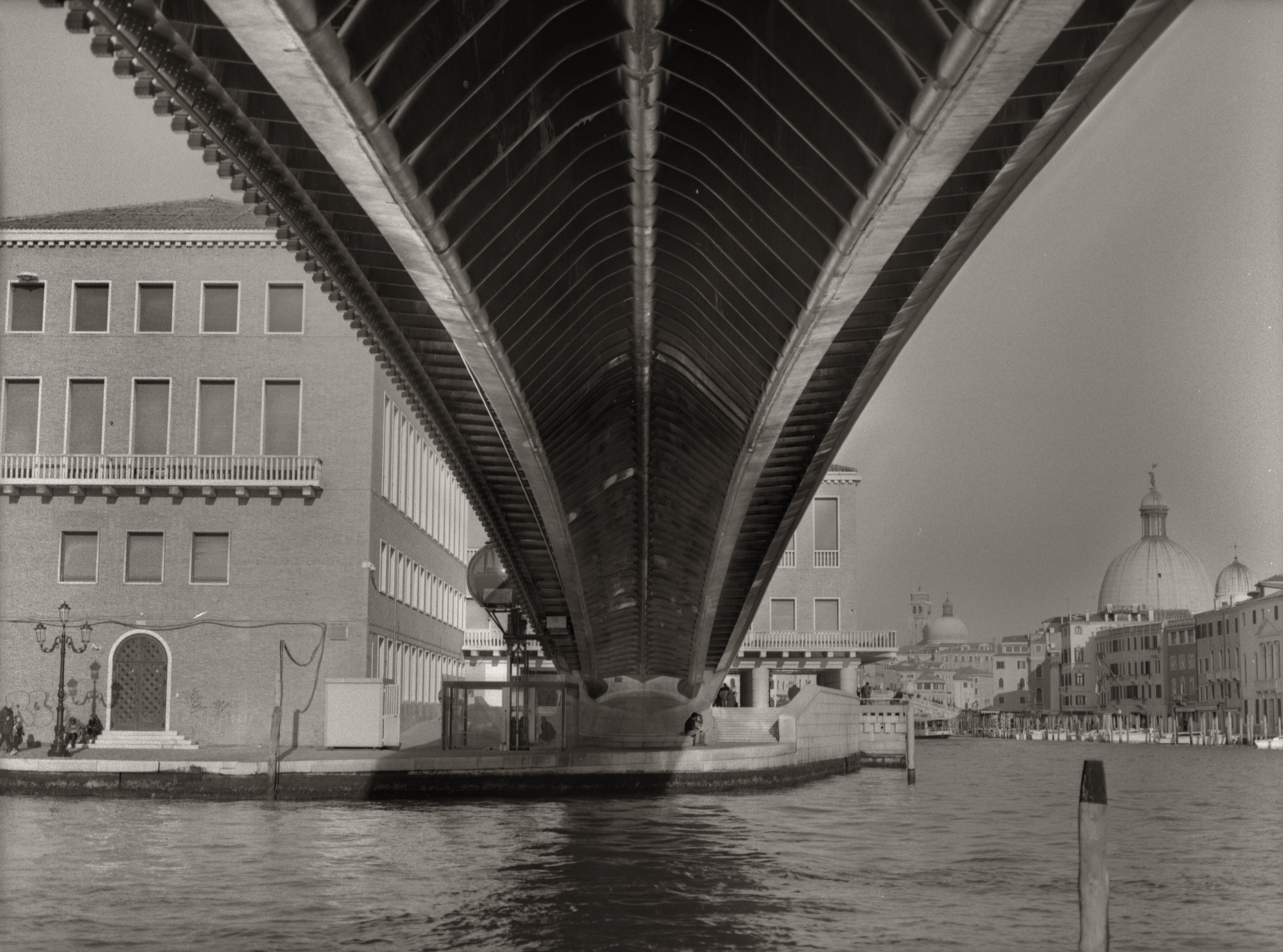
Ponte della Costituzione, underside showing structure, 2015

The Ponte della Costituzione (English: Constitution Bridge) is the fourth bridge over the Grand Canal in Venice, Italy. It was designed by Santiago Calatrava, and was moved into place in 2007 (connecting Stazione di Santa Lucia to Piazzale Roma), amid protest by politicians and the general public. The bridge was installed in 2008 and opened to the public on the night of September 11, 2008. The bridge was known as Quarto Ponte sul Canal Grande (English: Fourth Bridge on the Grand Canal) before the official name was adopted to celebrate the 60th anniversary of the Italian constitution in 2008. Tourists and locals in Venice now refer to it as the Calatrava Bridge (Italian: Ponte di Calatrava).

== Planning ==
In June 1999, the Municipality of Venice drafted a preliminary plan for a fourth bridge over the Grand Canal. Using a public selection process, they commissioned Santiago Calatrava in November 1999 to design the new bridge. Calatrava's response was an arched bridge with a large radius which was designed to be constructed off-site and installed entirely from the canal.

The bridge is situated at a strategic point, connecting the railway station (Stazione Santa Lucia), on the north with the Piazzale Roma (the City's arrival point by car/bus), on the south side of the Grand Canal. The bridge is important both functionally and symbolically, connecting arriving visitors to the city and welcoming them to Venice with a panoramic view of the Grand Canal.

== Design ==
Calatrava designed an arched truss bridge with a radius of 180 metres (590 ft), with a central arch, two side arches and two lower arches. Girders placed perpendicular to the arches join them together. The girders consist of steel tubes and plates, which form closed section boxes. The stairway on the bridge is paved with pietra d'Istria, a stone traditionally used in Venice, alternating with tempered glass steps illuminated from below by fluorescent lights. The parapet is also tempered glass, terminating in a bronze handrail with concealed lighting. The contractor which had the task of constructing the footbridge was Cignoni. Design and installation studies were carried out by a specialized group: professors Renato Vitaliani (Padua University) and Francesco Colleselli (Brescia University) for geotechnical and foundation aspects, the company Mastropasqua-Zanchin & Associates Structural Engineering for the steel arch and weldings verification, Fagioli Group and Giorgio Romaro (Padua University) for the installation activities.

The internal structure can be appreciated by looking at a cross-section of the bridge exhibited outside at the waterfront, located between the Railway Directorate Headquarters and the Santa Lucia railway station. After fabrication, the bridge was moved into place by a large barge in July 2007.

== Controversy ==
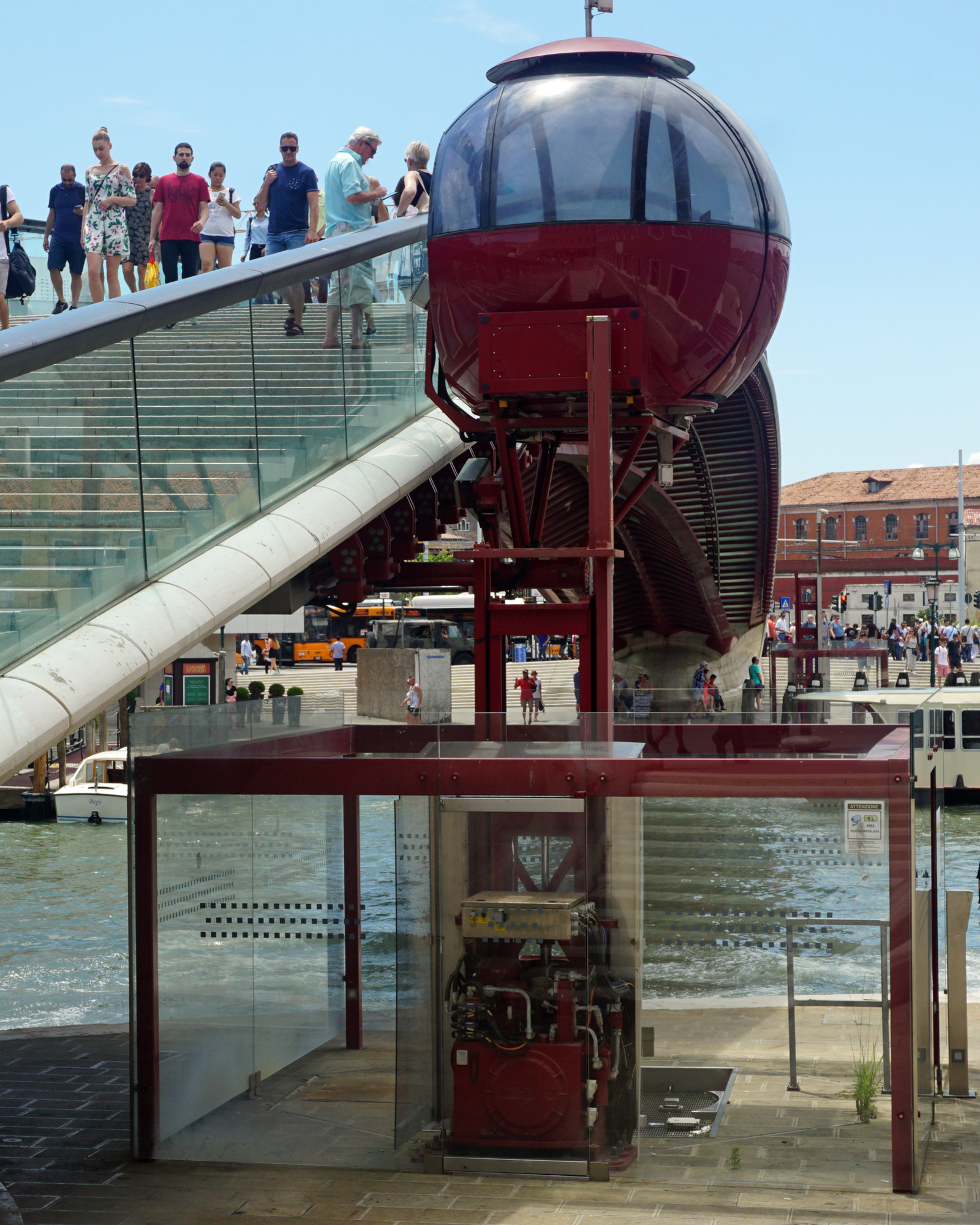
Wheelchair lift constructed after the bridge inauguration and later dismantled

The bridge has received heated criticism and seen inauguration delays and walk-outs, which originated from three main grievances: the lack of wheelchair access, the lack of its necessity and its modernist-minimalist style being incompatible with Venice's decorative medieval architecture.

The placement of a new bridge only 330 m (1,080 ft) southwest of Ponte degli Scalzi also proved controversial, since the distances between Scalzi and Rialto Bridges or between the Rialto and Ponte dell'Accademia bridges are much longer, and with no other way to cross the canal besides the waterbus (Italian: vaporetto) or traghetto. There is also no permanent connection between Venice and the well-populated Giudecca island to the south, although a tunnel has been proposed at not much greater cost than a bridge, promising better access for tourists and residents.

Ponte della Costituzione has many steps in it, which means elderly people have difficulty climbing it and wheelchair users are excluded from crossing. As a result of protests, a mobility lift system resembling a cocoon (not designed by the Calatrava) was eventually installed in 2010, incurring large costs since it was not part of the original design. The official budget for the project was €6.7 million, but actual costs escalated significantly. In April 2019, the Italian Court of Auditors ordered Venice to scrap the lift system, on the grounds that it was an expensive failure, being too slow and too hot. It was later dismantled. The decommissioning cost the city at least €40,000. The court placed blame on the projects' managers rather than the city government for the fiasco, paving the way for legal action by the latter against the former.

The bridge has also received criticism for its slippery glass surface, which has caused locals and tourists to fall and become injured. The city created a central corridor on the surface made of trachyte, though injuries from falls have persisted. In 2022, safety concerns overcame aesthetic principles when the city determined to replace all the glass sections with trachyte stone, to prevent regularly occurring falls. In December 2024, the city began removing the glass steps, which would be replaced with stone steps.
