= Sfalassà Viaduct =

Sfalassà Viaduct Viadotto Sfalassà
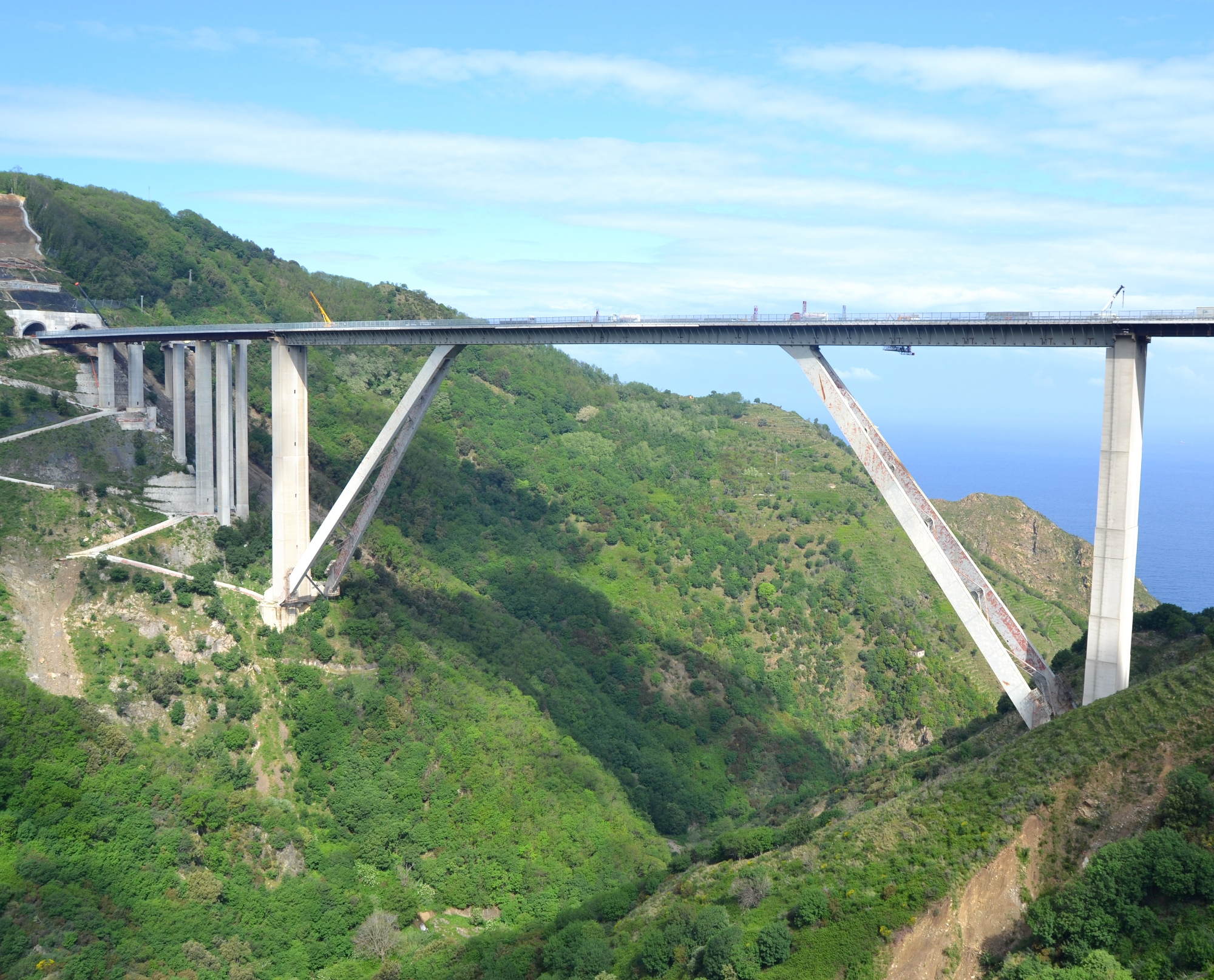
- Coordinates: 38.27130°N 15.80326°E
- Carries: Autostrada A2 (Italy)
- Locale: Bagnara Calabra, Calabria, Italy

Characteristics
- Design: Beam bridge (Portal frame)
- Material: Steel
- Height: 254 metres (833 ft)
- Longest span: 376 metres (1,234 ft)

History
- Architect: Silvano Zorzi
- Opened: 1974

Location
- Interactive map of Sfalassà Viaduct

Sfalassà Viaduct is a 254-metre-high (833 ft) viaduct near Bagnara Calabra, Calabria, Italy. The bridge is located on Autostrada A2 Salerno-Reggio Calabria Motorway and has a main span of 376 metres. It is the highest and longest span frame bridge in the world and as of 2019 it is among the 50 highest bridges of any type. It is the second highest bridge in Italy after the Italia Viaduct. The Sfalassà Viaduct won the CECM European award three times.

== See also ==
- List of highest bridges in the world
