= Autostrada RA15 (Italy) =

Controlled-access highway in Italy

Raccordo autostradale 15
- Motorway connection 15

Route information
- Part of E45
- Maintained by ANAS
- Length: 23.3 km (14.5 mi)
- Existed: 1985–present

Major junctions
- Beltway around Catania
- North end: San Gregorio di Catania
- A18 in San Gregorio di Catania; A19 in Catania
- South end: Misterbianco

Location
- Country: Italy
- Regions: Sicily

Highway system
- Roads in Italy; Autostrade; State; Regional; Provincial; Municipal
← RA 14	→ RA 16

The Autostrada RA15 and the connecting motorways

The Raccordo autostradale 15 (RA 15; "Motorway connection 15") or Tangenziale di Catania ("Catania ring road") or Catania's By Pass (West), is an autostrada (Italian for "motorway") 23.3 kilometres (14.5 mi) long in Italy to contour Catania in Sicily, running from north to south, west of the city. It is managed by ANAS. It is a part of the E45 European route. The Raccordo autostradale 15 was opened on 28 May 1985 and was called T09 until the 1990s.

== By Pass (West) ==
The RA15 is connected to the A18 to Messina, the A19 to Palermo and to all of the major national roads of Eastern Sicily. Since 2009 it is also linked to the A CT-SR to Syracuse.

=== RA15 ===
RACCORDO AUTOSTRADALE 15; Autostrada RA15; Tangenziale di Catania
Exit	↓km↓	↑km↑	Province	European Route
Messina-Catania; Diramazione Catania nord	0.0 km (0 mi)	23.3 km (14.5 mi)	CT	E45
Gravina	2.8 km (1.7 mi)	20.5 km (12.7 mi)	CT	E45
Catania - San Giovanni Galermo	4.5 km (2.8 mi)	18.8 km (11.7 mi)	CT	E45
Catania Ovest - Misterbianco	9.6 km (6.0 mi)	13.7 km (8.5 mi)	CT	E45
Catania San Giorgio	12.4 km (7.7 mi)	10.9 km (6.8 mi)	CT	E45
Rest area "San Giorgio"	13.4 km (8.3 mi)	9.9 km (6.2 mi)	CT	E45
Palermo - Catania; Asse attrezzato	14.9 km (9.3 mi)	8.4 km (5.2 mi)	CT	E45
Catania Sud; Catania–Fontanarossa Airport; Asse dei servizi	16.1 km (10.0 mi)	7.2 km (4.5 mi)	CT	E45
Zona industriale I (Nord); Asse di spina Est-Ovest	17.1 km (10.6 mi)	6.2 km (3.9 mi)	CT	E45
Catania-Siracusa	19.9 km (12.4 mi)	3.5 km (2.2 mi)	CT	E45
Zona industriale II (Sud)	20.7 km (12.9 mi)	2.6 km (1.6 mi)	CT	--
Orientale Sicula	23.3 km (14.5 mi)	0.0 km (0 mi)	CT	--

== By Pass (East) ==
The initial project had on the plans a second service road going through the city called By Pass East (today's A18dir) but due to the highly urbanized situation of Catania the project has never been completed leaving the road to terminate in the northern part of the city.
In the southern part of Catania, in July 2010 was completed another 5,0 km of service road called "Asse attrezzato", part of the initial project of the 1970s. This service road connects the motorway A19 to Palermo and the RA 15 to the southern part of the city. This second stretch of service road is not classified as motorway.

=== A18 Northern Catania connection ===
A18 DIRAMAZIONE CATANIA NORD; A18 Northern Catania connection
Exit	↓km↓	↑km↑	Province	European Route
Messina; RA15 – Catania's Bypass	0.0 km (0 mi)	3.7 km (2.3 mi)	CT	--
San Gregorio	0.1 km (0.062 mi)	3.6 km (2.2 mi)	CT	--
Canalicchio	2.0 km (1.2 mi)	1.7 km (1.1 mi)	CT	--
Catania Centro	3.7 km (2.3 mi)	0.0 km (0 mi)	CT	--

=== Asse attrezzato ===
ASSE ATTREZZATO
Exit	↓km↓	↑km↑	Province	European Route
Catania - Corso Indipendenza	0.0 km (0 mi)	5.0 km (3.1 mi)	CT	--
San Giorgio	1.3 km (0.81 mi)	3.7 km (2.3 mi)	CT	--
Librino	2.5 km (1.6 mi)	2.5 km (1.6 mi)	CT	--
Zona industriale	4.0 km (2.5 mi)	1.0 km (0.62 mi)	CT	--
Palermo - Catania	5.0 km (3.1 mi)	0.0 km (0 mi)	CT	E932

== See also ==
- Autostrade of Italy
- Roads in Italy
- Transport in Italy

=== Other Italian roads ===
- State highways (Italy)
- Regional road (Italy)
- Provincial road (Italy)
- Municipal road (Italy)
