= Autostrada A19 (Italy) =

Controlled-access highway in Italy

Autostrada A19

Route information
- Part of E90 and E932
- Maintained by ANAS
- Length: 199.6 km (124.0 mi)
- Existed: 1970–present

Major junctions
- West end: Palermo
- A20 in Termini Imerese; RA15 in Catania
- East end: Catania

Location
- Country: Italy
- Regions: Sicily

Highway system
- Roads in Italy; Autostrade; State; Regional; Provincial; Municipal
← A 18	→ A 20

The Autostrada A19 is an autostrada (Italian for "motorway") 199.6 kilometres (124.0 mi) long in Italy on the island of Sicily that links Palermo to Catania. The motorway from Palermo follows the Tyrrhenian coast and then turns south to go over the Madonie mountains and across the centre of the island to descend into the plain of Catania. It is a part of the E90 and E932 European routes.

The motorway is connected to the A20 Messina-Palermo and is linked to the A18 Catania-Messina by the RA15 (Catania's Ring Road-West).

== Route ==
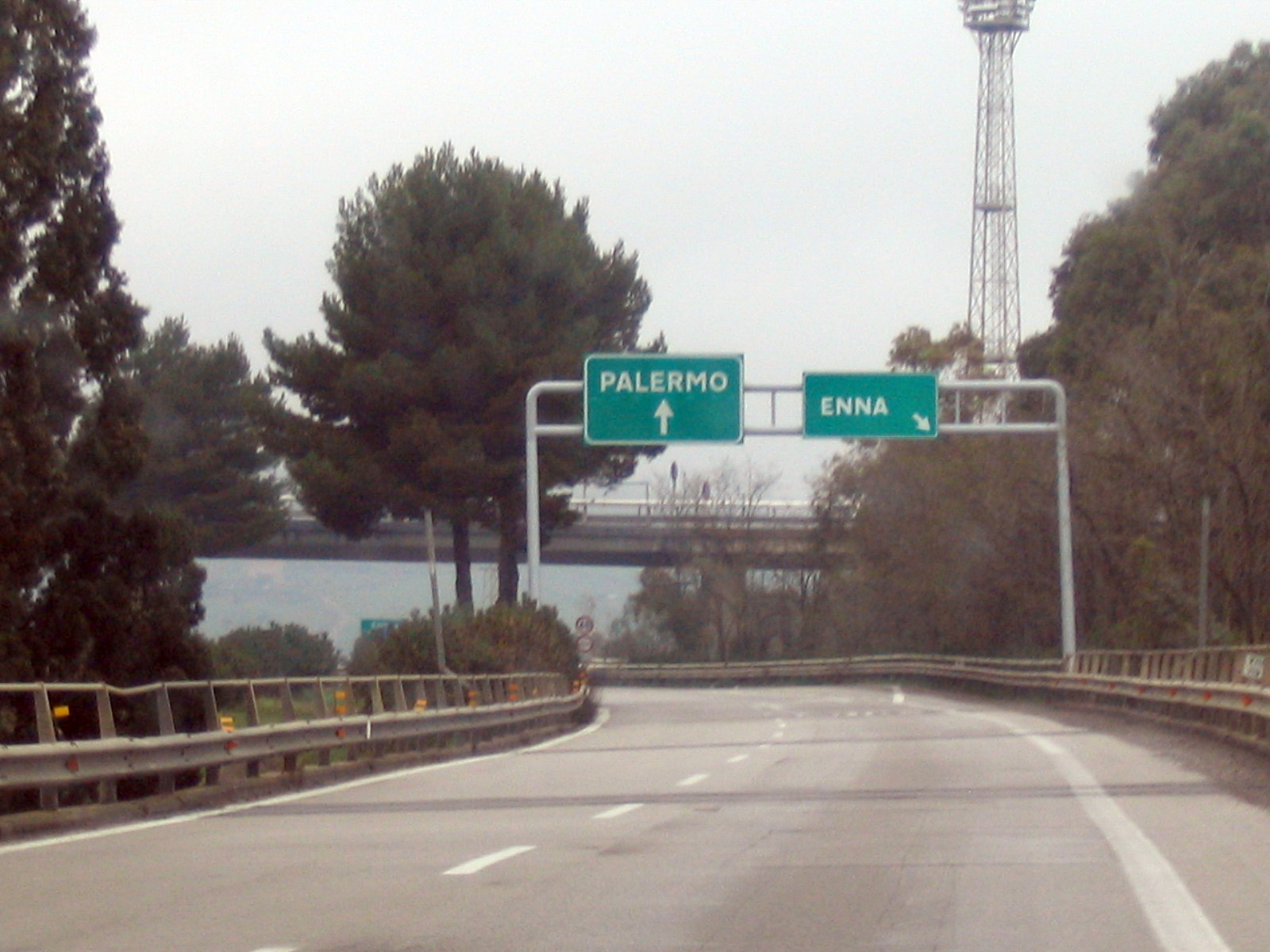
Autostrada A19 near Enna

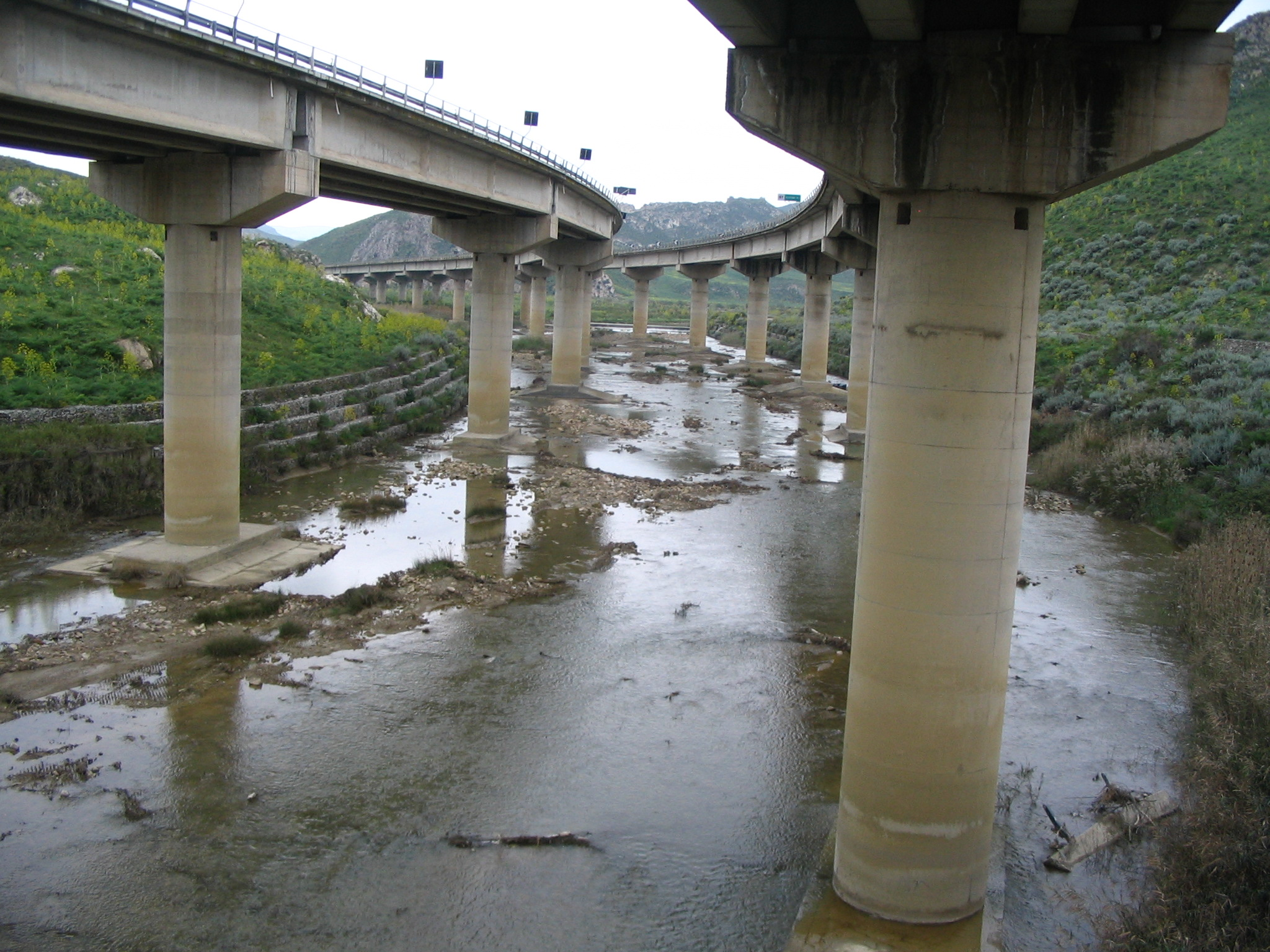
Autostrada A19 near Santa Caterina Villarmosa

PALERMO – CATANIA
Exit	↓km↓	↑km↑	Province	European route
Palermo Centro	0.0 km (0 mi)	199.6 km (124.0 mi)	PA	E90
Palermo Brancaccio; Industrial area	3.5 km (2.2 mi)	196.1 km (121.9 mi)	PA	E90
Villabate - Ficarazzi; Raccordo A19-Palermo; Catanese	5.5 km (3.4 mi)	194.1 km (120.6 mi)	PA	E90
Bagheria	12.2 km (7.6 mi)	187.4 km (116.4 mi)	PA	E90
Casteldaccia	15.2 km (9.4 mi)	184.4 km (114.6 mi)	PA	E90
Altavilla Milicia	17.2 km (10.7 mi)	182.4 km (113.3 mi)	PA	E90
Trabia	25.2 km (15.7 mi)	174.4 km (108.4 mi)	PA	E90
Termini Imerese	31.2 km (19.4 mi)	168.4 km (104.6 mi)	PA	E90
Rest area "Caracoli"	34.0 km (21.1 mi)	149.0 km (92.6 mi)	PA	E90
Industrial area	42.2 km (26.2 mi)	157.4 km (97.8 mi)	PA	E90
Buonfornello - Termini Imerese est Messina	46.0 km (28.6 mi)	153.6 km (95.4 mi)	PA	E932
Rest area "Scillato"	55.0 km (34.2 mi)	138.0 km (85.7 mi)	PA	E932
Scillato	62.0 km (38.5 mi)	137.6 km (85.5 mi)	PA	E932
Tremonzelli - Castellana Sicula	79.0 km (49.1 mi)	120.6 km (74.9 mi)	PA	E932
Resuttano	89.8 km (55.8 mi)	109.8 km (68.2 mi)	CL	E932
Ponte Cinque Archi - Santa Caterina Villarmosa	103.2 km (64.1 mi)	96.4 km (59.9 mi)	CL	E932
Caltanissetta	110.0 km (68.4 mi)	89.6 km (55.7 mi)	CL	E932
Enna	126.5 km (78.6 mi)	73.1 km (45.4 mi)	EN	E932
Rest area "Sacchitello"	131.0 km (81.4 mi)	75.0 km (46.6 mi)	EN	E932
Mulinello - Leonforte, Valguarnera Caropepe, Assoro	136.2 km (84.6 mi)	63.4 km (39.4 mi)	EN	E932
Dittaino; Industrial area	143.3 km (89.0 mi)	56.3 km (35.0 mi)	EN	E932
Agira - Raddusa	149.6 km (93.0 mi)	50.0 km (31.1 mi)	EN	E932
Catenanuova	164.0 km (101.9 mi)	35.6 km (22.1 mi)	EN	E932
Gerbini Sferro - Paternò	178.2 km (110.7 mi)	21.4 km (13.3 mi)	CT	E932
Motta Sant'Anastasia	189.6 km (117.8 mi)	10.0 km (6.2 mi)	CT	E932
Rest area "Gelso Bianco"	195.0 km (121.2 mi)	4.0 km (2.5 mi)	CT	E932
RA15 Catania's Ring Road Messina- Siracusa; Catania–Fontanarossa Airport; Orientale Sicula	199.6 km (124.0 mi)	0.0 km (0 mi)	CT	E932

=== A19-Palermo connection ===
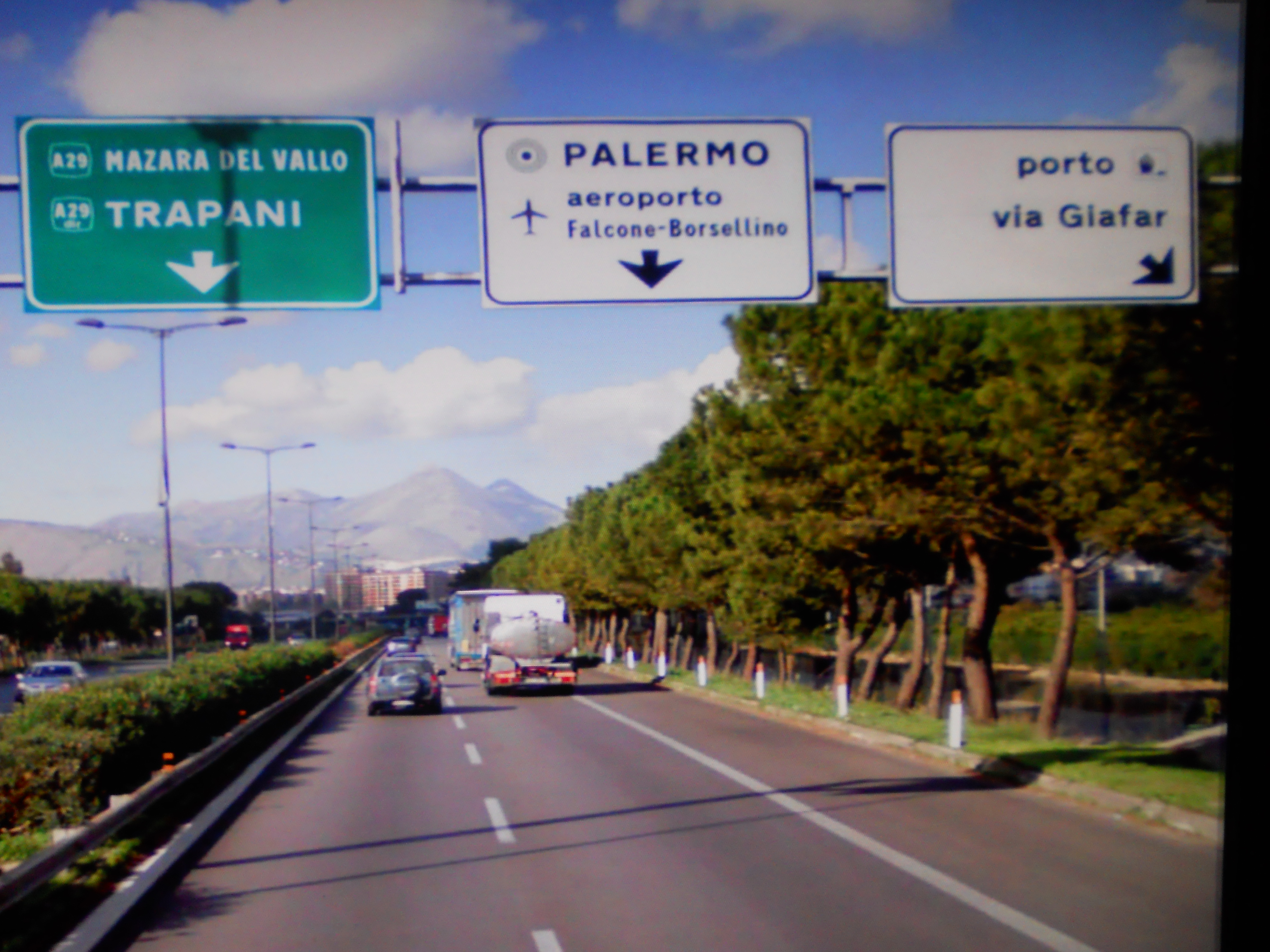
A19-Palermo connection

RACCORDO A19-PALERMO; A19-Palermo connection
Exit	↓km↓	↑km↑	Province	European route
Palermo-Catania	0.0 km (0 mi)	5.2 km (3.2 mi)	PA	E90
Villabate; Catanese	0.0 km (0 mi)	5.2 km (3.2 mi)	PA	E90
Palermo Via Giafar; Port of Palermo	4.9 km (3.0 mi)	0.3 km (0.19 mi)	PA	E90
Circonvallazione di Palermo	5.2 km (3.2 mi)	0.0 km (0 mi)	PA	E90

== See also ==
- Autostrade of Italy
- Roads in Italy
- Transport in Italy

=== Other Italian roads ===
- State highways (Italy)
- Regional road (Italy)
- Provincial road (Italy)
- Municipal road (Italy)
