= Autostrada A20 (Italy) =

Controlled-access highway in Italy

Autostrada A20

Route information
- Part of E45 and E90
- Maintained by ANAS
- Length: 183 km (114 mi)
- Existed: 1972–present

Major junctions
- East end: Messina
- A18 in Messina; A19 in Termini Imerese
- West end: Termini Imerese

Location
- Country: Italy
- Regions: Sicily

Highway system
- Roads in Italy; Autostrade; State; Regional; Provincial; Municipal
← A 19	→ A 21

The Autostrada A20 is an autostrada (Italian for "motorway") 183 kilometres (114 mi) long in Italy on the island of Sicily that links the city of Messina to Termini Imerese. The motorway from Messina follows the Tyrrhenian coast until it meets the A19 Palermo-Catania at Buonfornello, a frazione of Termini Imerese. The Autostrada A20, at its eastern-end, is also connected to the A18 Messina-Catania. It is a part of the E45 and E90 European routes.

Although the Autostrada A20 is also called Messina-Palermo, it is necessary to travel for 43 kilometres (27 mi) along the Autostrada A19 Palermo-Catania to reach Palermo. It's a four lane motorway (two lanes for each direction) in its whole length. Consorzio per le Autostrade Siciliane is in charge of toll collection, management, and maintenance of the motorway.

== History ==
The construction of the A20 was really slow, partially because of the difficult orography of the Tyrrhenian coast. The first stretch of this motorway, from Messina Boccetta to Divieto, was opened the 1 June 1972 but works for the entire length were completed only the 21 July 2005 with the opening of the exit for Castelbuono.

== Route ==
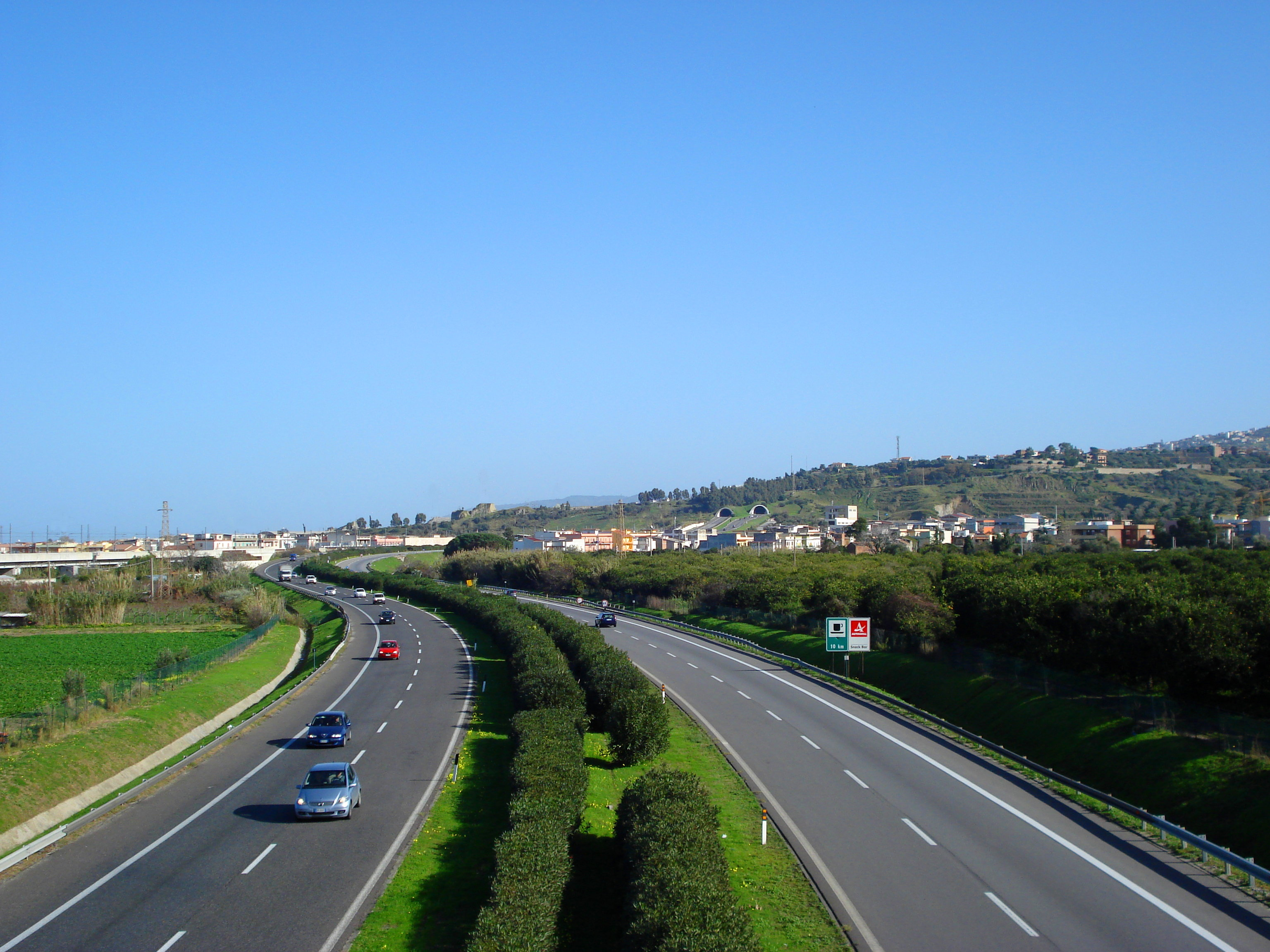
Autostrada A20 near Torregrotta

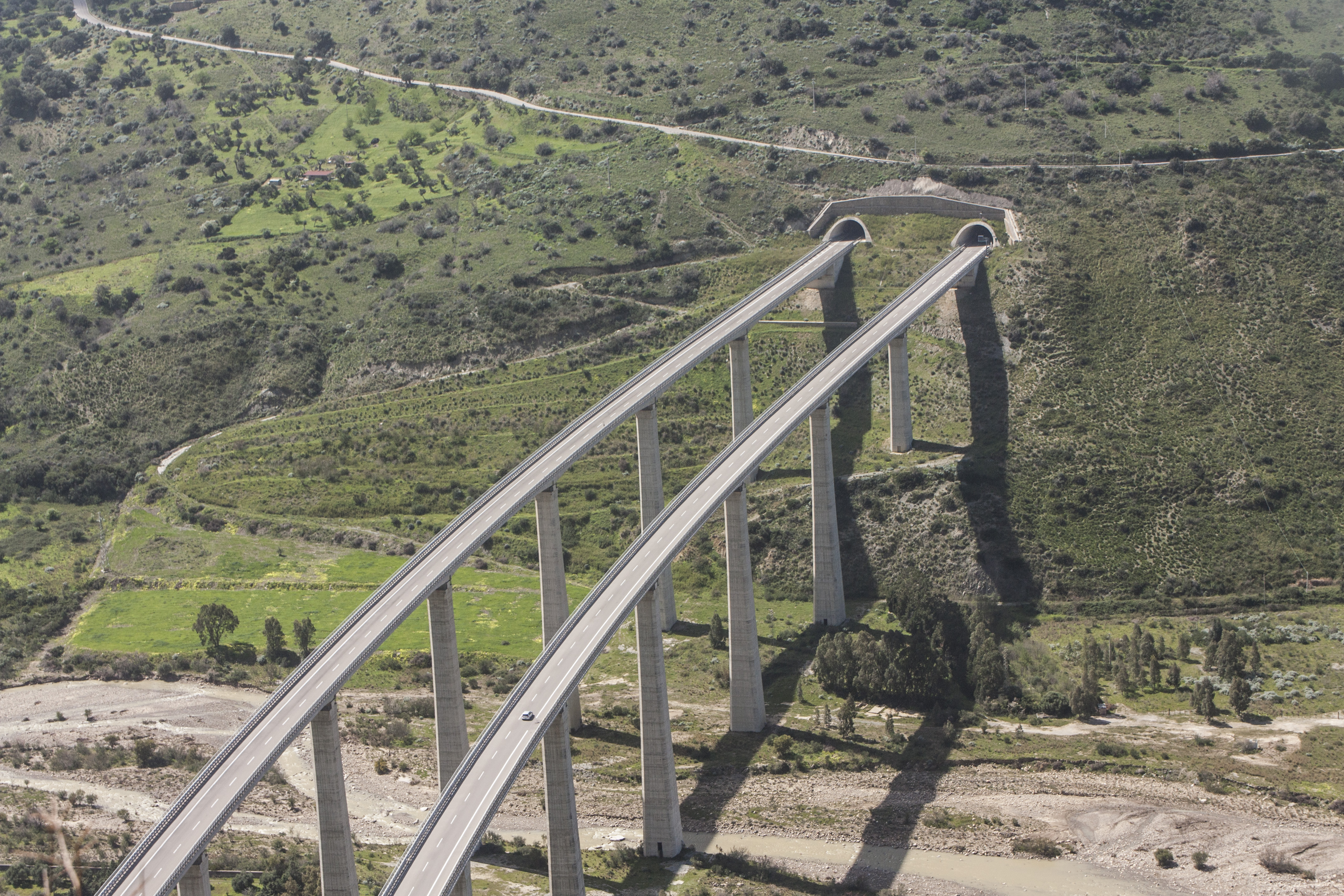
Autostrada A20 near Tusa

MESSINA – TERMINI IMERESE
Exit	↓km↓	↑km↑	Province	European route
Messina-Catania	0.0 km (0 mi)	183.0 km (113.7 mi)	ME	E45
Messina Sud - Tremestieri; Ferries to Villa San Giovanni	0.6 km (0.37 mi)	182.4 km (113.3 mi)	ME	E45
Rest area "Tremestieri Ovest" (Note: Only in the direction of Messina.)	-	180.0 km (111.8 mi)	ME	E45
Messina San Filippo	3.5 km (2.2 mi)	178.3 km (110.8 mi)	ME	E45
Messina Gazzi	5.1 km (3.2 mi)	176.7 km (109.8 mi)	ME	E45
Messina Centro; Ferries for Villa San Giovanni	7.1 km (4.4 mi)	174.7 km (108.6 mi)	ME	E45; E90
Messina Boccetta; Ferries for Villa San Giovanni	9.1 km (5.7 mi)	172.7 km (107.3 mi)	ME	E90
Toll gate Messina Nord	21.0 km (13.0 mi)	160.8 km (99.9 mi)	ME	E90
Villafranca Tirrena (Note: Exit only towards Palermo, entry only towards Messina.)	21.0 km (13.0 mi)	-	ME	E90
Rest area "Divieto"	22.0 km (13.7 mi)	159.0 km (98.8 mi)	ME	E90
Rometta	24.7 km (15.3 mi)	157.1 km (97.6 mi)	ME	E90
Milazzo; Ferries to Aeolian Islands	38.5 km (23.9 mi)	143.3 km (89.0 mi)	ME	E90
Rest area "Olivarella"	-	140.0 km (87.0 mi)	ME	E90
Barcellona Pozzo di Gotto	47.2 km (29.3 mi)	134.6 km (83.6 mi)	ME	E90
Falcone	58.7 km (36.5 mi)	123.1 km (76.5 mi)	ME	E90
Rest area "Tindari"	61.0 km (37.9 mi)	119.0 km (73.9 mi)	ME	E90
Patti	67.2 km (41.8 mi)	114.6 km (71.2 mi)	ME	E90
Brolo-Capo d'Orlando est	84.7 km (52.6 mi)	97.1 km (60.3 mi)	ME	E90
Rocca di Capri Leone - Capo d'Orlando ovest	97.8 km (60.8 mi)	84.0 km (52.2 mi)	ME	E90
Sant'Agata di Militello	106.6 km (66.2 mi)	75.2 km (46.7 mi)	ME	E90
Rest area "Acquedolci"	-	70.0 km (43.5 mi)	ME	E90
Reitano-Santo Stefano di Camastra	135.0 km (83.9 mi)	46.8 km (29.1 mi)	ME	E90
Tusa	144.0 km (89.5 mi)	37.8 km (23.5 mi)	ME	E90
Pollina-Castelbuono	155.0 km (96.3 mi)	26.8 km (16.7 mi)	PA	E90
Cefalù	166.8 km (103.6 mi)	16.2 km (10.1 mi)	PA	E90
Toll gate Buonfornello	181.8 km (113.0 mi)	1.2 km (0.75 mi)	PA	E90
Palermo-Catania	183.0 km (113.7 mi)	0.0 km (0 mi)	PA	E90; E932

== See also ==
- Autostrade of Italy
- Roads in Italy
- Transport in Italy

=== Other Italian roads ===
- State highways (Italy)
- Regional road (Italy)
- Provincial road (Italy)
- Municipal road (Italy)
