= Road hierarchy =

Hierarchy in road traffic

To reduce costs, a road hierarchy (bottom) channels travel demand (desire line thickness between settlements, top). Higher-class direct roads serve high-demand trips; lower-demand trips follow less direct routes on lower-class roads.

Six-stage hierarchy of traffic movement: main movement, transition, distribution, collection, access and termination. Intermediary stages may be absent, and at the start of movement, these stages occur in reverse order. Each stage typically occurs on a corresponding functional road type (e.g. distribution on minor arterials).

Basic functional road classes (arterial, collector and local) along the mobility-access continuum. Naming, range and subdivisions of each class vary by administrative division.

A road hierarchy is a system for categorizing roads. Road networks worldwide are typically organized according to one or more schemes:

- Functional classification reflects a road’s intended role, balancing mobility (efficient through movement) and access (reaching properties) by defining a clear hierarchy from arterials (including limited-access roads and controlled-access highways) to collectors and local roads.
- Administrative classification mirrors government tiers responsible for funding and maintenance, creating a hierarchy from national to local roads.
- Design type classification groups roads by geometric and operational characteristics, such as lane configuration and access control, and does not always form a strict hierarchy.

While conceptually distinct, these classification systems often overlap in practice. Roads of higher administrative status typically serve higher functional roles and follow higher design standards, though exceptions are common. Most countries emphasize either functional or administrative classification for legal and planning purposes, while design standards are applied during implementation.

The related concept of access management aims to provide access to land development while ensuring traffic flows freely and safely on surrounding roads.

== Functional classification ==
=== Arterial roads ===
==== Controlled-access highway ====
At the top of the mobility-access continuum in terms of traffic flow and speed are controlled-access highways. Their defining characteristic is the control of access to and from the road, meaning that the road cannot be directly accessed from properties or other roads, but only from specific connector roads. This indirection, in conjunction with high speed limits and multiple lanes, allows these roads to support fast traffic flow with high volume, in both urban and rural areas. They are at the bottom of the mobility-access continuum in terms of access to property, allowing access to almost nothing besides other roads and rest areas.

They are also known as freeways in the U.S., South Africa, and parts of Australia; as motorways in the U.K., New Zealand, and parts of Australia; and as expressways in numerous countries (though this term sometimes includes limited-access roads depending on the region).

Controlled-access highways do not have traffic signals nor at-grade crossings with other roads (intersections), railways, or pedestrian paths. When a road's path would intersect a controlled-access highway, the two roads will be vertically separated by an overpass (American English) or flyover (British English) or by a tunnel, preventing the need for an intersection. Pedestrian footbridges and tunnels are also grade-separated. The opposing directions of travel are separated by a median strip (American English) or central reservation (British English) generally a few meters to a few dozen meters wide, which may consist of a traffic barrier or a natural barrier like grass. This separation makes controlled-access highways a subset of divided highways (American English) or dual carriageways (British English). Generally, these roads prohibit pedestrians and vehicles not powered by a motor (e.g., bicycles). Parking is also generally prohibited.

===== Highway access =====
Ramps (American English) or slip roads (British English) are special connector roads that allow traffic access to and from a controlled-access highway. Their length is normally on the order of several hundred meters in order to allow vehicles a sufficient distance to safely change speed while transferring from one road to the other road. The course of a ramp is often curved as needed in order to connect the two roads without sharp turns, which require vehicles to slow down considerably to traverse them safely. In many cases, a ramp may be subject to grade separation and use a flyover. In the US, where the standard term for a flyover is overpass (or underpass, when the road with level altitude is the higher road), the word flyover, which is less common, is reserved for those that carry ramps. Entrance ramps (or on-ramps) allow ingress traffic to enter the highway, and exit ramps (or off-ramps) allow egress traffic to exit the highway.

Ramps may be described by their orientation. A directional ramp curves toward the desired direction of travel, a semi-directional ramp exits on the side of the road opposite to the desired direction of travel, then curves back toward the desired direction, and a non-directional ramp curves away from the desired direction of travel (such as the looping ramps in a cloverleaf interchange).

The full set of ramps that connect a controlled-access highway to another road is called a interchange (American English) or grade-separated junction (British English). The interchange is classified as a system interchange if traffic remains in the highway system, traveling from one controlled-access highway to another, or a service interchange if the interchange serves a local area by allowing travel between a controlled-access highway and a road without access control. The controlled-access highway is called the mainline, and the uncontrolled road is called the crossroad. More complex interchanges involving many roads may have characteristics of both types of interchanges as required.

The number of directions one can travel toward or away from the interchange on all of the roads involved is the number of "legs". When two roads meet, there are four paths to and from the interchange, and so the interchange has four legs, but if one of the roads terminates at the interchange, it will only have three legs. Interchanges with more legs require joining elements from four- and three-legged interchanges in order to permit travel from any one direction to any other direction. If all possible connections exist, it is a complete interchange providing complete access; if not, it is an incomplete interchange providing incomplete access.

==== Limited-access road ====
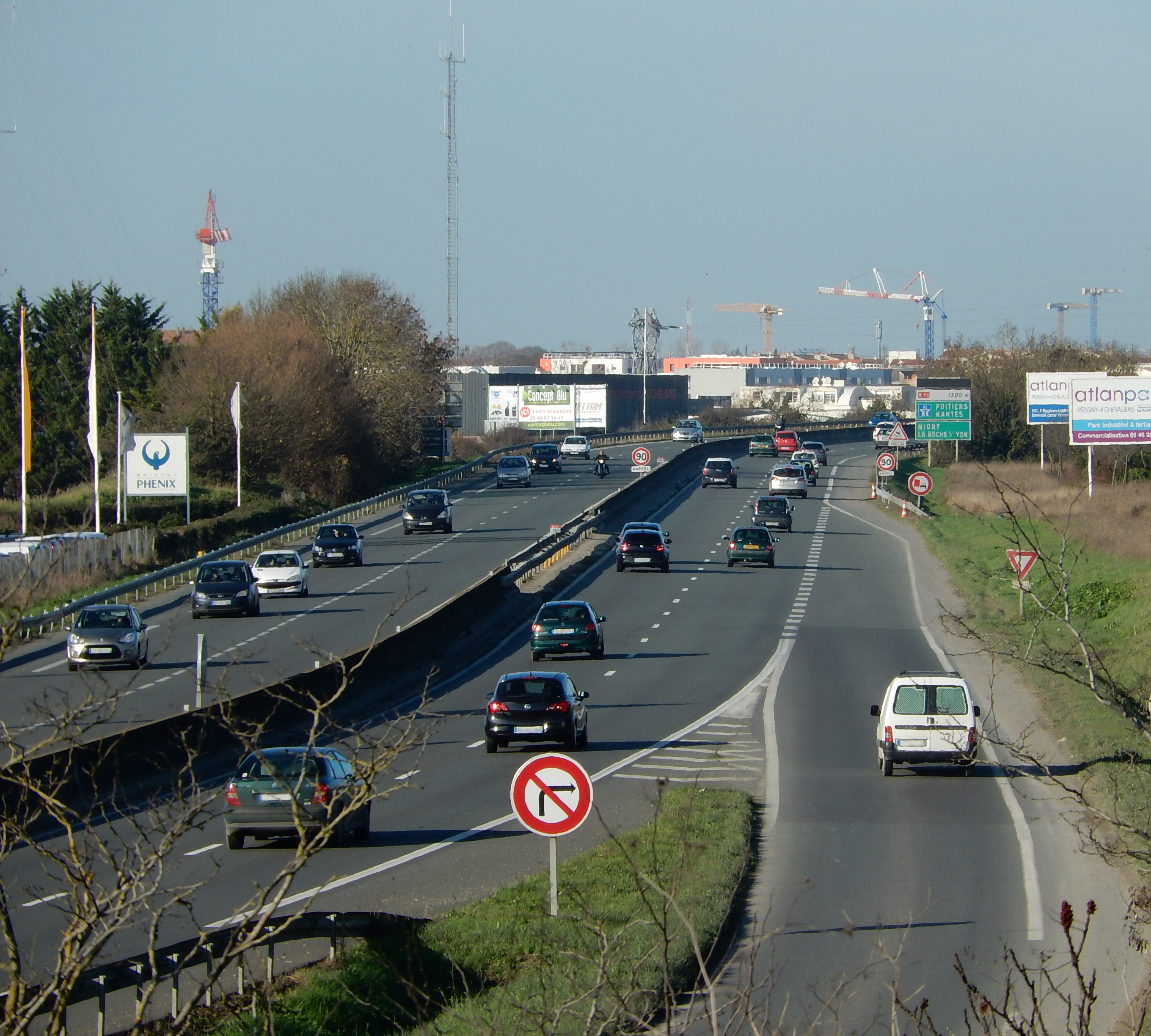
Dual carriageway near La Rochelle, France

A limited-access road, also known as limited-access highway in the U.S. and as expressway in numerous countries (including parts of the U.S.), is similar to a controlled-access highway in that it conforms to many or most of the standards that controlled-access highways follow, but does allow some uncontrolled access to local roads. They can be viewed as a middle ground between controlled-access highways and minor arterial roads. The degree of isolation from local traffic varies between countries and regions, as does a precise definition of the term itself.

Controlled-access highways can also be viewed as a subset of limited-access highways that has stricter requirements.

==== Minor arterial roads ====
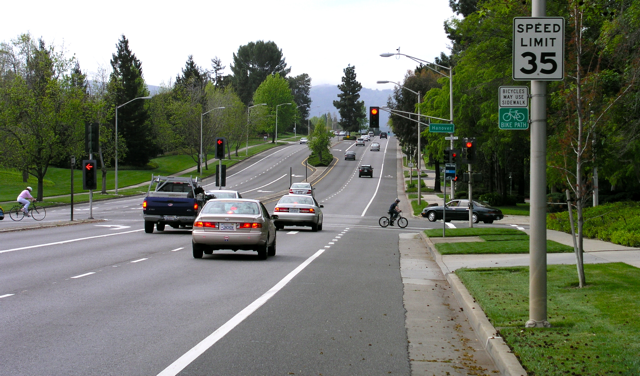
Minor arterial road with bike lane in Palo Alto, California

A minor arterial road or arterial thoroughfare is a road without controlled access that can carry a large volume of local traffic at a generally high speed, being below controlled-access highways in the mobility-access continuum. They primarily service trips of moderate length and connect collectors to higher types of arterial roads.

Intersections of minor arterial roads are almost always at-grade, and use traffic signals to coordinate traffic that would otherwise intersect, but traffic signals are often omitted when minor collector roads intersect, usually placing a stop sign at the collector road to prevent the traffic on the arterial road from being impeded.

Arterial roads almost always have multiple lanes to allow for high capacity.

=== Collector road ===
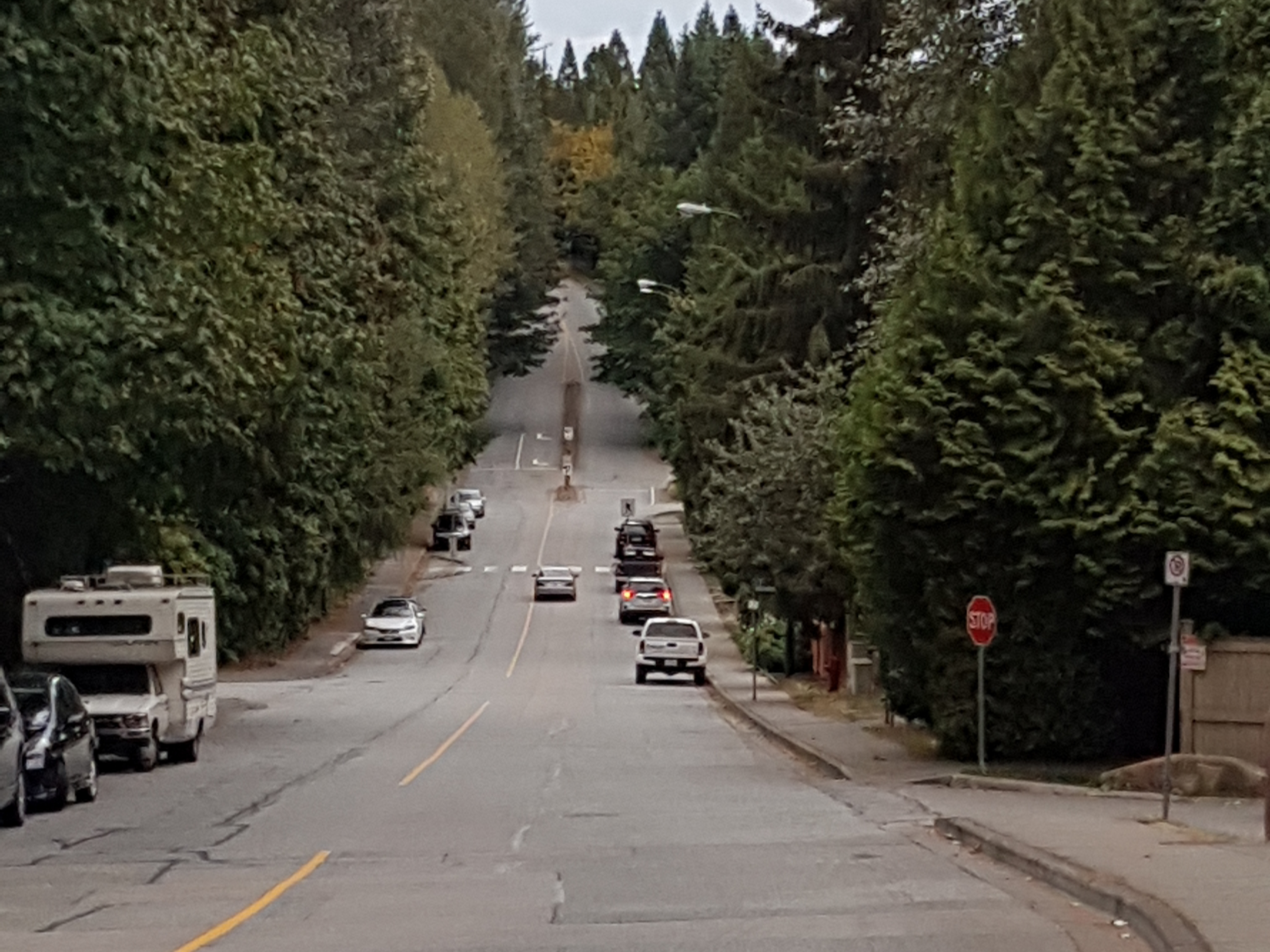
Typical collector road in Port Moody, British Columbia, Canada

A collector road, also known as a distributor road, is a road that serves to move traffic from local streets to arterial roads that is designed to provide access to properties, providing a balance between access and mobility. It has a low to moderate capacity and a generally low speed limit. They are below arterial roads in terms of speed and capacity, but higher in terms of access, as they can allow access to residential properties.

Collector roads can vary widely in appearance. Some urban collectors are wide boulevards entering communities or connecting sections. Others are residential streets, which are typically wider than local roads, although few are wider than four lanes. Small-scale commercial areas can be found on collector roads in residential areas. Key community functions such as schools, churches, and recreational facilities can often be found on collector roads.

A collector road usually consists of a mixture of signaled intersections, roundabouts, traffic circles, or stop signs, often in the form of four-way stops. Two-way stops are generally used at intersections with local streets that favour traffic movement on the collector. In North America, a collector road normally has traffic lights at intersections with arterial roads, whereas roundabouts and two-way stops are more commonly used in Europe.

Speed limits are typically 20‑35 mph (30‑60 km/h) on collector roads in built-up areas, depending on the degree of development and frequency of local access, intersections, and pedestrians, as well as the surrounding area (the speed tends to be lowest in school zones). Traffic calming is occasionally used in older areas on collector roads as well.

=== Local road ===
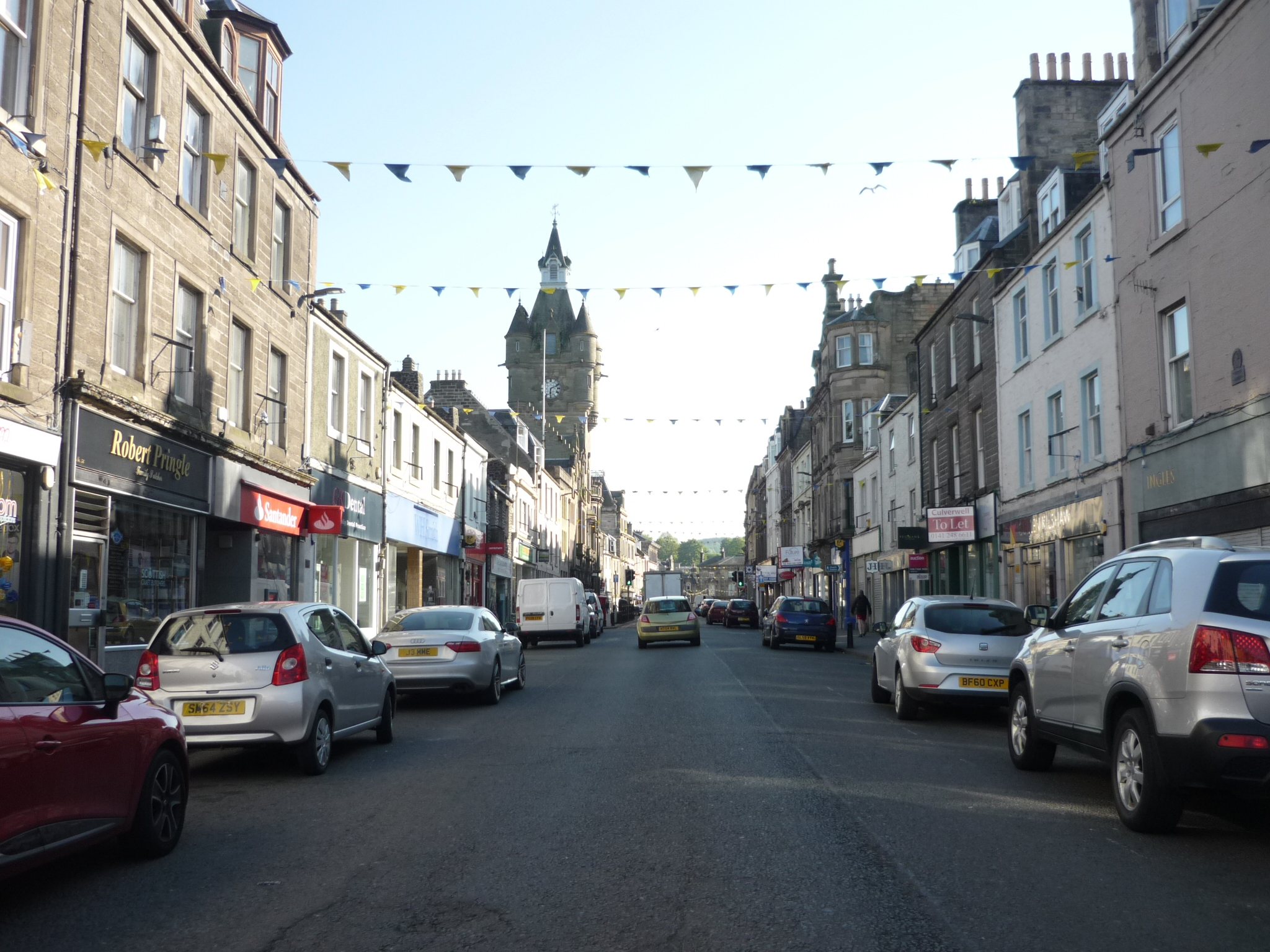
The High Street in Hawick, Scotland

A local road, also called a street, is a road in a built environment that has all kinds of properties beside it which can be accessed from the road or a parking lot connected to the road. Different types of local roads include residential streets, avenues, and alleys. They are designed to provide the highest access to property, they have the lowest speed limits and capacities in the mobility-access continuum and are typically not used for through traffic.

Local roads have at-grade intersections and have similar specifications to collector roads. Local roads may be unpaved in some cases. A common feature of local roads is driveways, which connect the road to a residential property.

== National highway systems ==
In some countries, the controlled-access highways form an expansive system that generally connect distant cities within the country to each other, but there are often more highways that only have local courses designed to improve connections in a smaller region, such as within a metropolitan area. Controlled-access highways are often given numbers to form a national highway system, such as the Bundesautobahn in Germany or the Interstate Highway System in the United States, but note that a national highway system may also consist of other numbered highways that are not implemented as controlled-access highways.

Many countries may have more than one national highway system of a lower rank, such as the U.S. Highways (not to be confused with the Interstate system), only portions of which run on controlled-access highways. Conversely, there may also be controlled-access highways not part of a numbered system. Highways are usually given icons featuring the number of the highway called highway shields or route markers. In addition to the national highway system, there may be provincial-level or state-level (US) highway systems of a lower rank, which need not consist mainly of controlled-access highways.

== United States ==
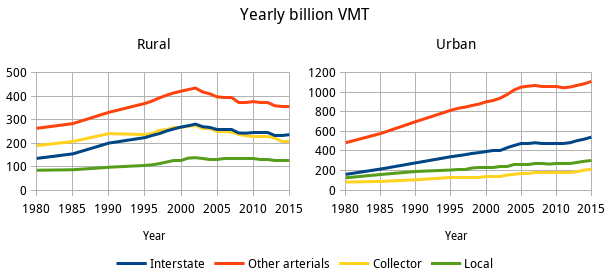
Vehicle miles of travel by highway functional system in the US

The U.S. Federal Highway Administration defines the following functional classification hierarchy: (Note: Highway Functional Classification Concepts, Criteria and Procedures, pp. 2, 19, 23, 24.)

- Arterials
  - Principal arterials
    - Controlled-access highways
      - Interstate highways
      - Other freeways and expressways
    - Other principal arterials (with partial or no access control)
  - Minor arterials
- Non-arterials
  - Collectors
    - Major collectors
    - Minor collectors
  - Local roads and streets

The American Association of State Highway and Transportation Officials defines the following functional design types: (Note: "Functional Classification as a Design Type". A Policy on Geometric Design of Highways and Streets.)

- Freeways
- Arterials
- Collectors
- Local roads and streets

Arterials are major through roads that are expected to carry large volumes of traffic. At the top of the mobility-access continuum, they include freeways, whose on- and off-ramps enable operating with less friction at a high speed with high flow. In some places, arterials include large divided roads with few or no driveways that cannot be called freeways because they have occasional at-grade intersections with traffic lights that stop traffic (expressways in California, which are limited-access roads) or they are just too short (superarterials in Nevada). Frontage roads are often used to reduce the conflict between the high-speed nature of an arterial and property access concerns.

Collectors, collect traffic from local roads, and distribute it to arterials. Traffic using a collector is usually going to or coming from somewhere nearby. They should not to be confused with collector lanes, which reduce weaving on freeways.

At the bottom of the mobility-access continuum are local streets and roads. These roads have the lowest speed limit, and carry low volumes of traffic. In some areas, these roads may be unpaved.

== Europe ==
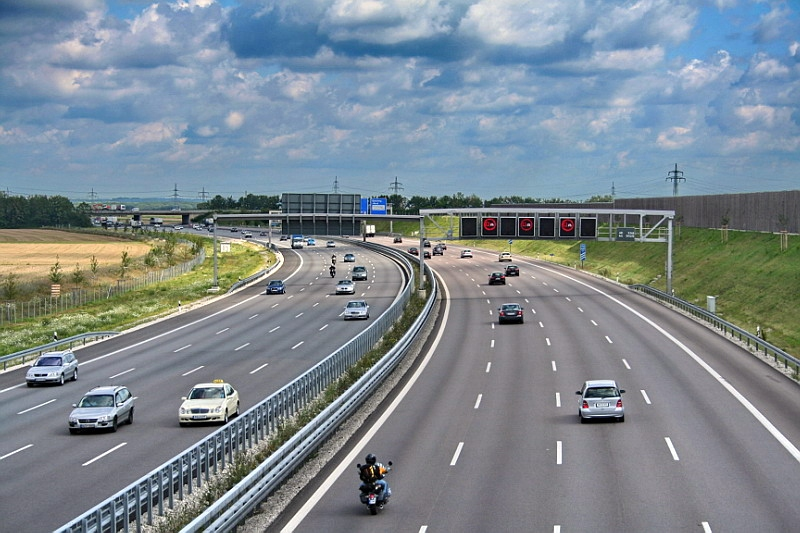
Bundesautobahn 9 near by Garching bei Muenchen, Germany

Most of Europe has a legal system based on European and international treaties which define at European/international level three types of road: motorways, express roads, and other roads. This vision comes from the 20th century and is limited to traffic code and legal issues. Each nation has its own hierarchy of roads, although there is also a European road numbering at European level, for European roads.

Most of Europe has adopted Motorways (Autoroutes/Autobahnen/Autopistas/Autostrade), usually similar to those in France and the UK. The idea was originally developed in Germany, where all motorways are toll-free, and has spread widely. All major through routes in the EU and neighbouring countries have a European E-Road number in addition, or in the case of some countries' motorways, instead of a national number. In the UK, Albania, Iceland, Andorra and Cyprus these numbers are not displayed (although in Cyprus, signposted E roads indicate miscellaneous roads).

Otherwise, most other European countries have some form of differentiating between national routes, regional and inter-regional roads and other local routes.

=== Comparison of symbols and names ===
Here there is a table comparing the symbols and generic names of the various route types in Europe. Not shown are the expressways (limited-access roads) and municipal-level routes, as these categories seldom have specific signage. Some countries have two categories of secondary routes, in which case they are shown here in hierarchical order.

Country	E-road (subcategory of highways)	Controlled-access highway	Primary route	Secondary route
Austria		Autobahn	Bundesstraße	Landesstraße
Belgium		Autosnelweg / Autoroute	Nationale Weg / Route nationale	Nationale Weg / Route nationale
Czech Republic		Dálnice	Silnice	Silnice
Denmark		No specific sign Motorvej	Primærrute	Sekundærrute
Estonia		Kiirtee	Põhimaantee	Tugimaantee Kõrvalmaantee
Finland		Valtatie	Kantatie	Seututie Yhdystiet
France		Autoroute	Route nationale	Route départementale
Germany		Autobahn	Bundesstraße	L 1 Landesstraße K 1 Kreisstraße
Greece		Αυτοκινητόδρομος	Εθνική Οδός	Επαρχιακή Οδός
Hungary		Autópálya	Főút	Főút
Iceland	None exist	None exist	Vegur	Vegur
Ireland		Mótarbhealach / Motorway	Bóthar náisiúnta / National road	Bóthar réigiúnach / Regional road Bóthar áitiúil / Local road
Italy, San Marino, and Vatican City		Autostrada	Strada statale	Strada regionale Strada provinciale
Latvia		None exist	Autoceļš	Autoceļš
Lithuania		Magistralinis kelias	Krašto kelias	1001; Rajoninias kelias
Luxembourg		Autobunn	Nationalstrooss	Nationalstrooss
Moldova	None exist	None exist	Drumul național	Drum național
Netherlands		Rijksweg	Provinciale weg	Provinciale weg
Norway		Riksvei	Riksvei	Fylkesvei
Poland		Autostrada	Droga krajowa	Droga wojewódzka
Portugal		Auto-estrada	N 1 Estrada nacional	R 1 Estrada regional
Romania		Autostradă	Drum național	Drum județean
Russia		Магистральная	Региональная	—N/a
Serbia		Autoput	Državni put	Državni put
Slovakia		Diaľnica	Cesta I. triedy	Cesta II. triedy
Slovenia		Avtocesta	Glavna cesta	Regionalna cesta
Spain and Andorra		Autovía	Carretera nacional	(Note: Each autonomous community of Spain has its own abbreviation.); Autovía/Carretera
Sweden		No specific sign	Riksväg	Länsväg
Switzerland and Liechtenstein		Autobahn / Autoroute / Autostrada	Hauptstraße / Route principale / Strada principale / Via principala	Kantonsstraße / Route cantonale / Strada cantonale
Turkey		Otoyol	Devlet Yolu	İl yolu
Ukraine		No designated numbering Автомагістраль Міжнародна дорога (шлях)	Національна дорога (шлях) Регіональна дорога (шлях)	Територіальна дорога (шлях)
United Kingdom	Not signaled	Motorway	A road	B road

=== United Kingdom ===
In the United Kingdom, roads are classified according to an administrative (statutory) hierarchy that reflects importance and development plans.

==== Motorway ====
Motorways are high-speed roads similar to freeways. They are designated with an M prefix or (M) suffix. e.g. M1, A1(M). The speed limit is generally 70 miles per hour (110 km/h) and there is a hard shoulder. Emergency telephones are located every mile along the route so motorists with broken-down vehicles can contact the authorities, although this is increasingly being done using mobile phones. Signs are blue with white text for both destinations and motorway numbers. In general, junctions are given numbers which are displayed prominently, sometimes with a letter suffix, in a small black box on all the signs for any given junction. Junctions are generally signed one mile before they exit, with three or four further signs as the junction is reached, although on busy urban stretches this first warning can reduce to about ⅓mile. Cyclists, pedestrians, mopeds, very slow vehicles and certain other traffic are banned.

==== A-roads ====
Primary A-roads are green on maps and signs. A main recommended route, they are usually single carriageway or dual carriageway, but can be single track as in North West Sutherland. The primary road network is fully connected, meaning you can reach any part from any other without leaving the network. Some of the major dual carriageway primary routes have numbered junctions or hard shoulders in the style of the Continental semi-motorways. Many primary routes are largely or wholly subject to clearway restrictions, and in major cities they may be classed as red routes. Emergency telephones, if present at all, are usually infrequent – there may be some additional telephones operated by the UK's two main motoring organisations, the RAC and the AA, but these are becoming rarer.

A non-primary A-road often exists where the route is important but there is a nearby primary route (A or motorway) which duplicates this road's function. Shown as red on maps, and has white signage with black lettering. Some non-primary A-class roads are partially subject to clearway restrictions.

==== Other roads ====
B-roads are regional in nature and used to connect areas of lesser importance. Usually shown as brown or yellow on maps and have the same white signs as non-primary A-class routes. If the route is primary, like the B6261, then it will be shown the same as a primary A-class route.

C-roads are used as local authority designations for routes within their area for administrative purposes. These routes are not shown on small-scale road maps, but have occasionally been known to appear on road signs.

Unclassified roads are local roads with no defined destination. Local destinations may, however, be signed along them.

=== France ===
In France, roads are classified according to an administrative hierarchy that reflects the authority responsible for their management. Characteristics such as speed or crossings may vary independently of this classification.

==== Autoroutes ====
Along with the rest of Europe, France has motorways or autoroutes similar to the British network. Unlike in the UK, the network is mostly accessible on payment of a toll, which is usually distance-dependent; there are generally more toll motorways in the south of France. However, sections passing through or close to major towns and cities are usually free. As in the UK, destinations reached via a motorway are shown with white text on a blue background. Junctions are usually numbered, the numbers being shown on signs in a small oval in the corner of the sign.

==== Routes nationales ====
Before the construction of autoroutes, routes nationales were the highest classification of road. They are denoted by a route number beginning "N", or occasionally "RN". Going back to a Napoleonic road classification system, these are main roads comparable with British primary routes. They are maintained directly by the state and are usually the shortest route between major centres. Many N-class roads are dual carriageway for some or all of their length, with a few also being given the designation of semi-motorway, where junctions are grade-separated and there is a central reservation with crash barrier. The hard shoulder is often narrower than on full motorways and there are fewer emergency telephones.

==== Routes départementales ====
France (including overseas territory) is split into 100 departments, the second-highest tier of local government, similar to a UK county or US state. The departments have responsibility for all roads beginning with a letter "D", or occasionally "RD". These roads vary in quality, from newly built local dual carriageways and downgraded routes nationales to winding roads that are barely wide enough for traffic to pass. Generally, they are quieter than the routes nationales, and of a reasonable standard.

==== Routes communales ====
In general, each settlement in France is a commune – akin to a British civil parish. This most local level of government is responsible for maintaining all the local roads, which are numbered with a letter "C" prefix. Except in major towns and cities, where their numbers are usually not marked on signs, they are usually single-track and may be in a state of poor repair due to the large number of roads covered by populations as small as 10.

=== Hungary ===
In Hungary, roads are classified by design type as follows:

- Motorway (Hungarian: autópálya): controlled-access highway with at least 2+2 travel lanes and 1+1 emergency lane, central reservation, no at-grade intersections, and a speed limit of 130 km/h
- Expressway (Hungarian: autóút): limited-access road with 1+1 or more travel lanes, optionally emergency lanes and central reservation, some at-grade intersections (only if 1+1 lanes), and a speed limit of 110 km/h
- Arterial road or main road (Hungarian: főút), with one digit in their name, e.g. 6-os út
- County road (Hungarian: megyei út), with two digits, e.g. 16-os út
- Local road (Hungarian: helyi út), with three or more digits

=== Italy ===
In Italy, roads can be classified according to an administrative hierarchy into state, regional, provincial and municipal roads. They can also be classified into the following design types.

==== Autostrade ====
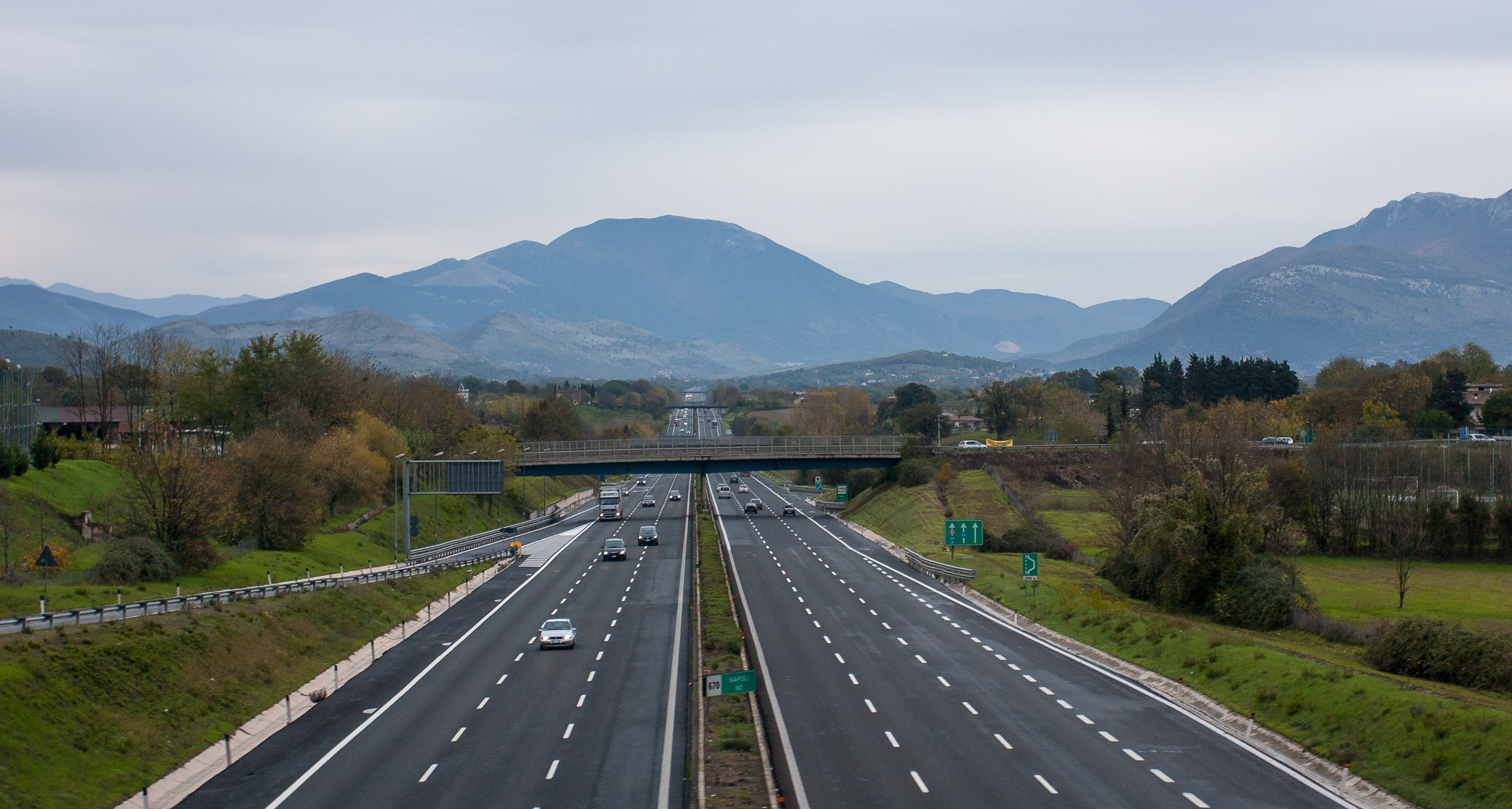
Autostrada A1 runs through Italy linking some of the largest cities of the country: Milan, Bologna, Florence, Rome and Naples

Autostrade (motorways) are designated by an "A" prefix and signed with a white‑on‑green octagonal shield. They are managed by concessionaire companies under the Ministry of Infrastructure and Transport, with tolls collected via closed (distance‑based) or open (flat‑rate) systems. The standard speed limit for cars is 130 km/h, with provisions up to 150 km/h on concession sections equipped with the SICVE average‑speed system. As of July 2022, they total about 7,016 km, plus 13 spur routes totalling 355 km, for a density of 22.4 km of motorway per 1,000 km² of territory. They feature varying lane configurations: 1,870.2 km with three lanes per carriageway, 129 km with four lanes, 1.8 km with five, and the remainder with two lanes per carriageway.

Italy inaugurated the world’s first motorway in 1924 with the Autostrada dei Laghi ("Lakes Motorway") connecting Milan and Lake Como and Lake Maggiore, originally opened as a single‑carriageway road.

==== Extra-urban roads ====
Dual carriageways (unofficially called superstrade) are divided into:

- Strade extraurbane principali (type-B): toll-free main highways with paved shoulders, built to near‑motorway standards, with a maximum speed of 110 km/h and at least two lanes per direction. Signs are white‑on‑blue and, as in autostrade, pedestrians, bicycles, and slow vehicles are prohibited.
- Strade extraurbane secondarie (type-C): all non‑urban roads that lack full type-A/B standards. They have a 90 km/h speed limit and may be single‑carriageway.

==== Urban roads ====
There are three types:

- Strade urbane di scorrimento (type-D): urban expressways with at‑level junctions and a 70 km/h limit.
- Strade urbana di quartiere (type-E): two-lane neighborhood routes; they include strada urbana ciclabile (type E-bis), cycle‑priority streets with 30 km/h limits.
- Strade locali (type-F): they include strade vicinali which provide direct property access and itinerari ciclopedonali providing safe pedestrian or cycle travel.

=== Czech Republic and Slovakia ===
This administrative hierarchy was defined under the 1961 Czechoslovak road act and adapted separately by each country after the dissolution of Czechoslovakia:

- Motorways (Czech: dálnice, Slovak: diaľnica): state-owned tolled trunk highways with at least 2 lanes per direction and an emergency lane, white-on-green signage, number with a "D" prefix, 130 km/h speed limit (80–90 km/h in urban areas).
- Expressways (Czech: rychlostní silnice, Slovak: rychlostná cesta): limited-access highways below motorway standard, "R" prefix. Category discontinued in the Czech Republic since 2016 but continues to exist in Slovakia
- Highways (Czech: silnice, Slovak: cesta): numbered roads, up to 90 km/h, with "roads for motorcars" sections. Classified as:
  - First class roads (Czech: silnice I. třídy, Slovak: cesta I. triedy): 1–2 digits, state-owned, blue signage.
  - Second class roads (Czech: silnice II. třídy, Slovak: cesta II. triedy): 3 digits, region-owned, blue signage.
  - Third class roads (Czech: silnice III. třídy, Slovak: cesta III. triedy): region-owned.
- Local roads (Czech: místní komunikace, Slovak: miestna cesta): municipal roads in four importance classes, from major urban collectors to pedestrian/cycle paths. Include "express local roads" built to expressway standards.
- Utilitarian roads (Czech: účelová komunikace, Slovak: účelová komunikácia): either closed (private) or publicly accessible (but with motor vehicles prohibited on forest roads).

=== Poland ===
In Poland, roads are classified according to an administrative hierarchy as follows:

- National roads (Polish: drogi krajowe) – trunk roads, international E-road (motorways and express roads)
- Voivodeship road (Polish: drogi wojewódzkie) – regional roads
- County roads (Polish: drogi powiatowe)
- Communal/municipal roads (Polish: drogi gminne)

=== Portugal ===
In Portugal, roads are classified according to an administrative hierarchy as follows:

- Motorways ("A", Portuguese: autoestradas), most of them with tolls
- Principal routes ("IP", Portuguese: itinerários principais) – north-south and east-west country-wide roads
- Complementary routes ("IC", Portuguese: itinerários complementares) – complementary routes: roads that branch from principal routes
- National routes ("N", Portuguese: estradas nacionais) – roads used to link cities, municipal seats, and other important sites that are not linked by one of the precedent road types
- Regional routes ("R", Portuguese: estradas regionais) – roads linking places of interest within the region they were built in
- Municipal roads ("M", Portuguese: estradas municipais) – roads linking different places within a municipality

=== Romania ===
In Romania, roads are classified according to an administrative hierarchy as:

- Motorways ("A", Romanian: autostrăzi)
- National and European roads ("DN", "E", Romanian: drumuri naționale și europene)
- National roads ("DN", Romanian: drumuri naționale)
- County roads ("DJ", Romanian: drumuri județene
- Communal roads ("DC", Romanian: drumuri comunal)

=== Cyprus ===
In Cyprus, roads are classified according to a functional hierarchy as:

- Motorways ("A", Greek: αυτοκινητόδρομος) are mainly 2 lanes on each side but some areas in Nicosia and Limassol have 3 lanes on each side.
- Trunk roads ("B"): these are mainly the old roads the motorways have replaces but not all of them are. These link towns together and also include some ring-roads. Most of these are single-carriageway 2 lane roads but a few of them are 4 lane dual-carriageway.
- Secondary roads ("E"): these are main roads which go through multiple villages and small towns and are built similarly to B roads. A few of them can also be 4 lane dual-carriageways.
- Local roads ("F"): small village roads which normally only serve 1 or a few villages. These can be 2 lane roads but also a few of them are 1 lane but wide enough for 2 cars to pass
- Unclassified: the broadest type of classifications. These can be dirt-roads leading to farms and can also be dual-carriageways. The majority of them are 1 or 2 lane roads in towns or villages.

== See also ==
- Green transport hierarchy
- Street hierarchy
