= Autostrada A18 (Italy) =

Controlled-access highway in Italy

Autostrada A18

Route information
- Part of E45
- Maintained by ANAS
- Existed: 1971–present

Section 1
- Length: 77 km (48 mi)
- North end: Messina
- Major intersections: A20 in Messina; RA15 in Catania
- South end: Catania

Section 2
- Length: 59.1 km (36.7 mi)
- North end: Syracuse
- South end: Modica

Location
- Country: Italy
- Regions: Sicily

Highway system
- Roads in Italy; Autostrade; State; Regional; Provincial; Municipal
| ← A 17 | → A 19 |

The Autostrada A18 is an autostrada (Italian for "motorway") 77 kilometres (48 mi) long in Italy on the Ionian coast of Sicily that links Messina to Catania. The motorway is linked to the A20 Messina-Palermo at its northern end and to the A19 Palermo-Catania through the RA15 Catania's Ring Road at its southern end. There is also a second stretch of the Autostrada A18, 59.1 kilometres (36.7 mi) long, on the south part of the island, running from Syracuse to Modica, and with the plan to extend it to Gela. It is a part of the E45 European route.

From the beginning it was planned to unite the two sections into a single motorway, from Messina to Gela, which would make it possible to optimize connections with the tourist areas and those in the eastern area of Sicily at the time undergoing industrialisation. The two sections of the Autostrada A18 are connected to each other, without interruption, through the Catania's Ring Road (from Catania Nord to the Passo Martino district), the Autostrada Catania-Siracusa (from the Passo Martino district to Augusta-Villasmundo) and the strada statale 114 Orientale Sicula (from Augusta-Villasmundo to Syracuse).

== Route ==
=== Messina – Catania ===
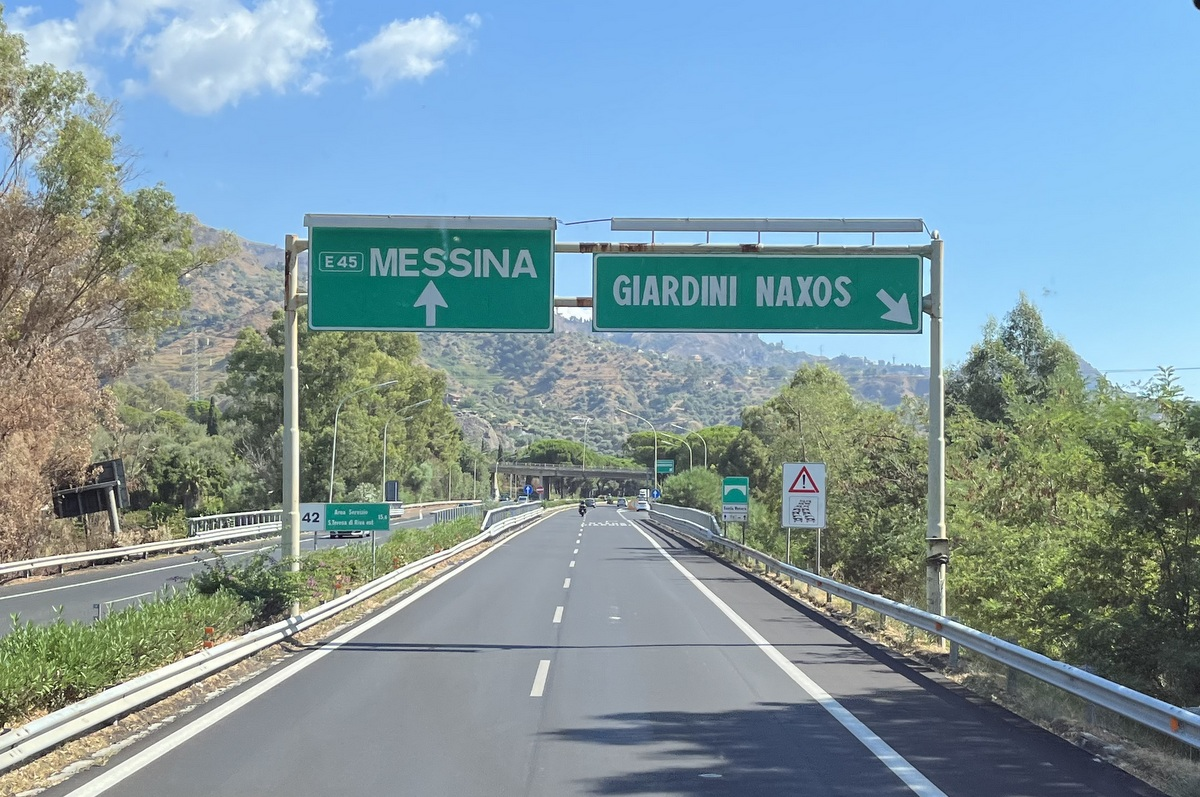
Autostrada A18 near Giardini Naxos

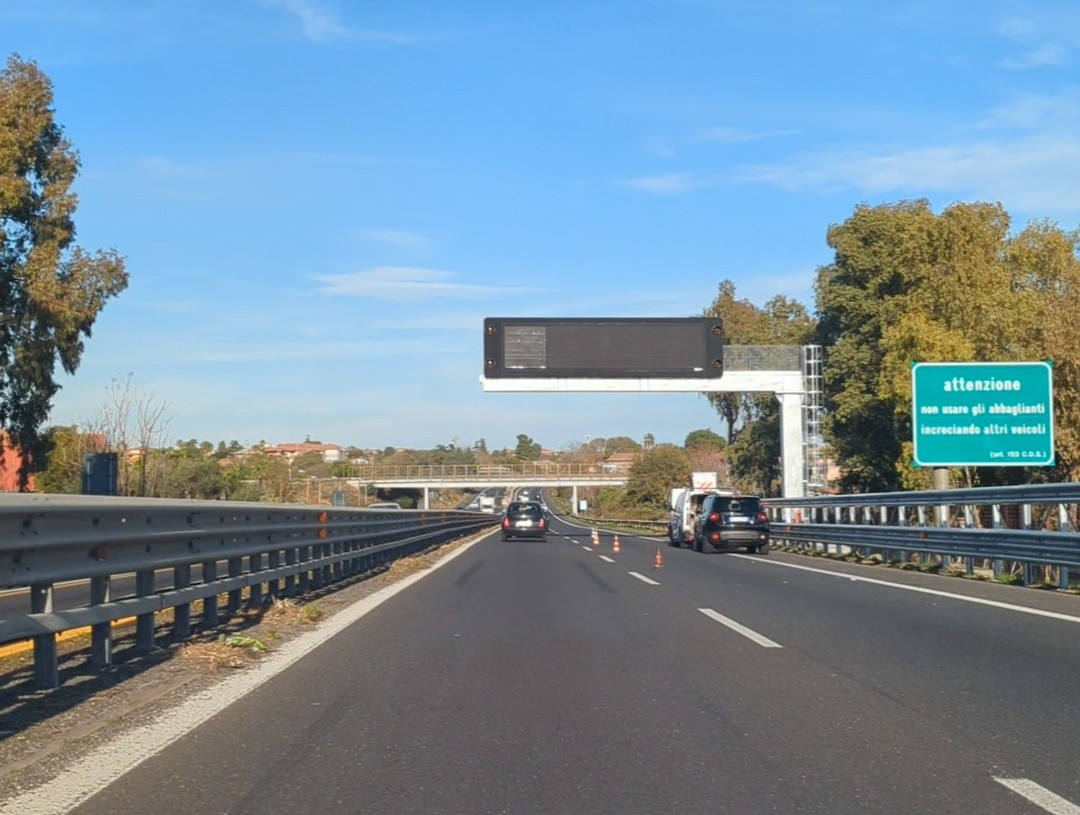
Autostrada A18 near Catania

MESSINA – CATANIA
| Exit | ↓km↓ | ↑km↑ | Province | European route |
| Messina-Palermo | 0.0 km (0 mi) | 77.0 km (47.8 mi) | ME | E45 |
| Messina Sud – Tremestieri | 1.4 km (0.87 mi) | 75.6 km (47.0 mi) | ME | E45 |
| Toll gate Messina Sud | 1.6 km (0.99 mi) | 75.4 km (46.9 mi) | ME | E45 |
| Itala (in project) | 11.0 km (6.8 mi) | 66.0 km (41.0 mi) | ME | E45 |
| Alì Terme (in project) | 17.7 km (11.0 mi) | 59.3 km (36.8 mi) | ME | E45 |
| Roccalumera | 21.3 km (13.2 mi) | 54.3 km (33.7 mi) | ME | E45 |
| Santa Teresa di Riva - Valle d'Agrò (in project) | 26.4 km (16.4 mi) | 50.5 km (31.4 mi) | ME | E45 |
| Rest area "Barracca" | 25.6 km (15.9 mi) | 50.0 km (31.1 mi) | ME | E45 |
| Taormina | 35.2 km (21.9 mi) | 40.4 km (25.1 mi) | ME | E45 |
| Giardini Naxos | 41.0 km (25.5 mi) | 34.6 km (21.5 mi) | ME | E45 |
| Rest area "Calatabiano" | 42.2 km (26.2 mi) | 33.4 km (20.8 mi) | CT | E45 |
| Fiumefreddo | 47.4 km (29.5 mi) | 28.2 km (17.5 mi) | CT | E45 |
| Mascali - Giarre nord (in project) | 53.4 km (33.2 mi) | 23.6 km (14.7 mi) | CT | E45 |
| Giarre | 58.7 km (36.5 mi) | 16.9 km (10.5 mi) | CT | E45 |
| Acireale | 68.9 km (42.8 mi) | 6.7 km (4.2 mi) | CT | E45 |
| Rest area "Aci Sant'Antonio" | 71.3 km (44.3 mi) | 4.3 km (2.7 mi) | CT | |
| Toll gate Catania Nord | 75.6 km (47.0 mi) | 0.7 km (0.43 mi) | CT | |
| Paesi etnei | 76.7 km (47.7 mi) | 0.3 km (0.19 mi) | CT | |
| Catania Centre – San Gregorio; Catania's Ring Road | 77.0 km (47.8 mi) | 0.0 km (0 mi) | CT | |

==== A18 Northern Catania connection ====
A18 DIRAMAZIONE CATANIA NORD; A18 Northern Catania connection
| Exit | ↓km↓ | ↑km↑ | Province |
| to Messina; RA15 – Catania's Bypass | 0.0 km (0 mi) | 3.7 km (2.3 mi) | CT |
| San Gregorio | 0.1 km (0.062 mi) | 3.6 km (2.2 mi) | CT |
| Canalicchio | 2.0 km (1.2 mi) | 1.7 km (1.1 mi) | CT |
| Catania Centro | 3.7 km (2.3 mi) | 0.0 km (0 mi) | CT |

=== Siracusa – Ragusa – Gela ===
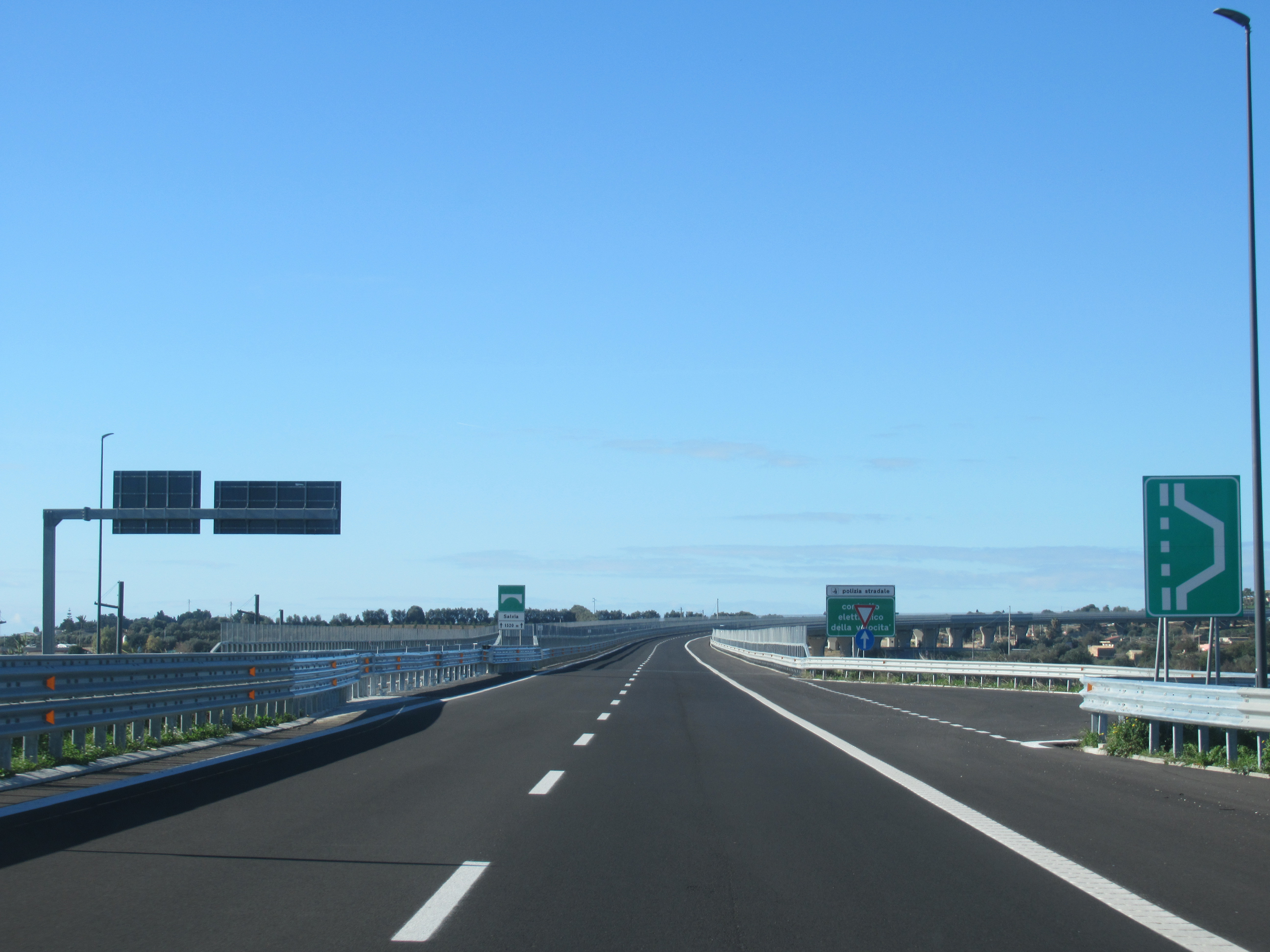
Autostrada A18 near Ispica

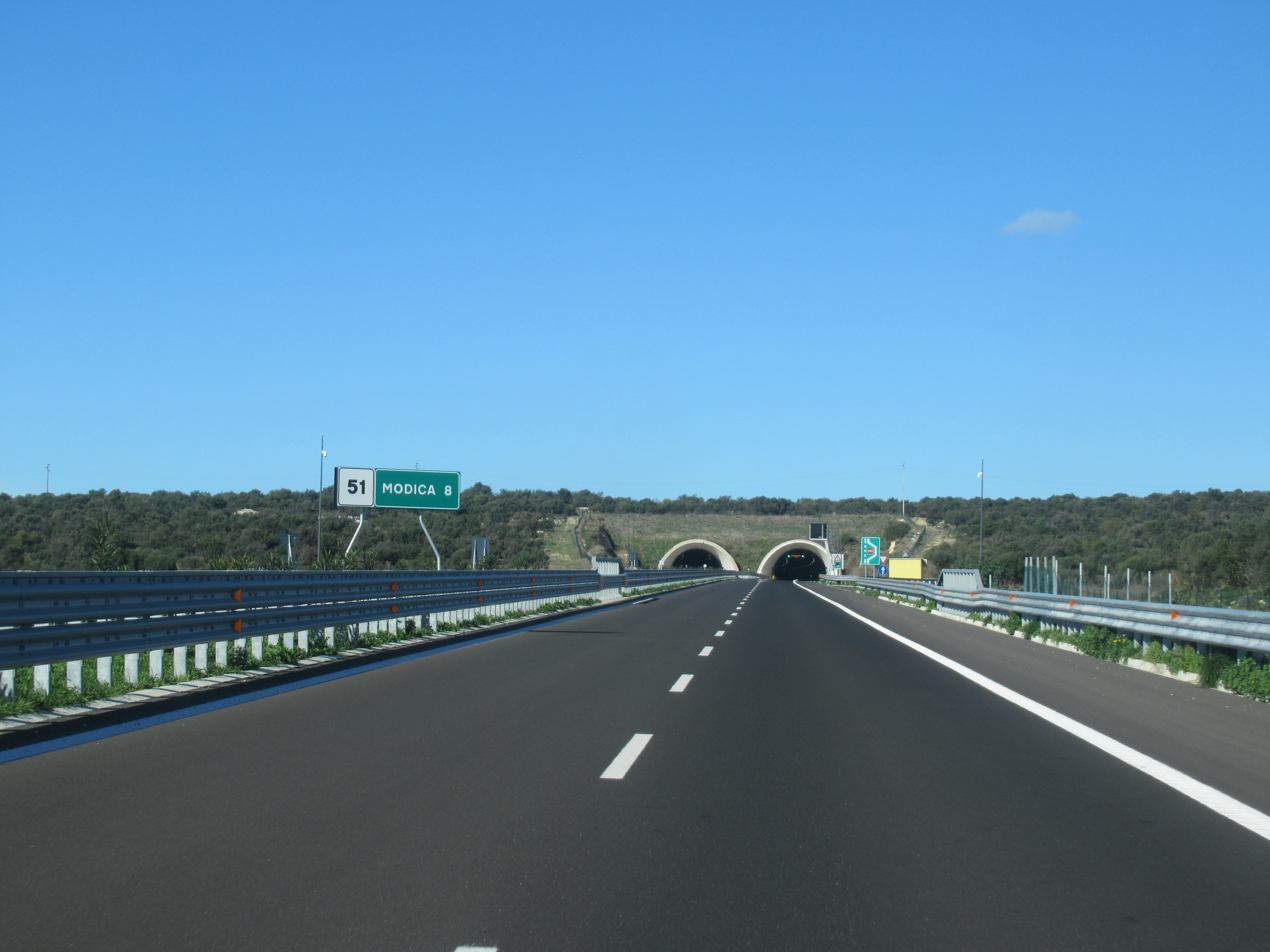
Autostrada A18 near Modica

SIRACUSA – MODICA
| Exit | ↓km↓ | ↑km↑ | Province | European route |
| Orientale Sicula; Syracuse | 0.0 km (0 mi) | 132.7 km (82.5 mi) | SR | E45 |
| Canicattini Bagni | 0.1 km (0.062 mi) | 132.6 km (82.4 mi) | SR | E45 |
| Cassibile | 9.5 km (5.9 mi) | 123.2 km (76.6 mi) | SR | E45 |
| Avola | 14.9 km (9.3 mi) | 117.8 km (73.2 mi) | SR | E45 |
| Noto | 24.6 km (15.3 mi) | 108.1 km (67.2 mi) | SR | E45 |
| Rest area "Tellaro" (in project) | 36.8 km (22.9 mi) | 104.9 km (65.2 mi) | SR | E45 |
| Rosolini | 40.0 km (24.9 mi) | 92.7 km (57.6 mi) | SR | E45 |
| Ispica - Pozzallo; Ferries to Malta | 47.5 km (29.5 mi) | 85.2 km (52.9 mi) | RG | E45 |
| Modica - Ragusana | 59.1 km (36.7 mi) | 73.6 km (45.7 mi) | RG | E45 |
End of motorway in operation
| Scicli | 70.5 km (43.8 mi) | 62.2 km (38.6 mi) | RG | in project |
| Rest area "Irminio" | 81.0 km (50.3 mi) | 51.7 km (32.1 mi) | RG | in project |
| Ragusa | 84.4 km (52.4 mi) | 48.3 km (30.0 mi) | RG | in project |
| Santa Croce Camerina - Vittoria sud | 93.8 km (58.3 mi) | 38.9 km (24.2 mi) | RG | in project |
| Vittoria nord - Comiso; Comiso Airport | 106.7 km (66.3 mi) | 26.0 km (16.2 mi) | RG | in project |
| Rest area "Acate nord" | 118.0 km (73.3 mi) | 14.7 km (9.1 mi) | RG | in project |
| Acate | 120.6 km (74.9 mi) | 12.1 km (7.5 mi) | RG | in project |
| Toll gate Gela est | 132.5 km (82.3 mi) | 0.2 km (0.12 mi) | CL | in project |
| Gela est - Sud Occidentale Sicula | 132.7 km (82.5 mi) | 0.0 km (0 mi) | CL | in project |

== See also ==
- Autostrade of Italy
- Roads in Italy
- Transport in Italy

=== Other Italian roads ===
- State highways (Italy)
- Regional road (Italy)
- Provincial road (Italy)
- Municipal road (Italy)
