= Strada provinciale 3 della Murgia Centrale =

Route information
- Length: 35 km (22 mi)
- Existed: 6 November 2009–present

Major junctions
- From: Canosa di Puglia
- To: Spinazzola

Location
- Country: Italy
- Regions: Apulia

Highway system
- Roads in Italy; Autostrade; State; Regional; Provincial; Municipal

The strada provinciale 3 della Murgia Centrale (SP 3), previously known as the strada regionale 6 della Murgia Centrale (SR 6), is a provincial road in Apulia, the route of which takes place entirely in the province of Barletta-Andria-Trani. It has two lanes in each direction, an emergency lane and a central reservation, is free of level intersections and has a total length of about 35 km (22 mi).

== History ==
The former SR 6 (now SP 3) was built to avoid the isolation of the inland municipalities, Minervino Murge and Spinazzola and allow them quick access to Autostrada A14. It also assumes great importance in the road infrastructure of the new Apulian province, allowing a quick connection with the capital municipalities.

The management was transferred from the Apulian Region to the Province of Bari (now the Metropolitan City of Bari). Since 2 November 2009, it has been managed by the Province of Barletta-Andria-Trani. With the transition to the new province, the road received the name of provincial road 3 Minervino-Spinazzola.

The former regional road 6 was opened to traffic, initially limited to the first section of Canosa di Puglia - Minervino Murge (about 15 km (9.3 mi)), on 6 November 2009.
