= Autostrada A17 (Italy) =

Former controlled-access highway in Italy

Autostrada A17

Route information
- Maintained by ANAS
- Length: 242 km (150 mi)
- Existed: 1969–1973

Major junctions
- West end: Naples
- East end: Bari

Location
- Country: Italy
- Regions: Campania and Apulia

Highway system
- Roads in Italy; Autostrade; State; Regional; Provincial; Municipal
← A 16	→ A 18

The Autostrada A17 was the name of the autostrada (Italian for "motorway") section 242 kilometres (150 mi) long in Italy located in the regions of Campania and Apulia connecting Naples to Bari, used from its opening in 1969 until the inauguration of the Lanciano-Canosa di Puglia section of the Autostrada A14 in 1973, which created a continuous connection between Bologna and Bari. Autostrada A17 crossed the Italian Peninsula from west to east and thus connected the Tyrrhenian Sea with the Adriatic Sea.

The section from Naples to Canosa di Puglia was later renamed Autostrada A16, while the section connecting Canosa di Puglia to Bari was integrated into Autostrada A14.

The reasoning behind the renaming of the Naples to Canosa section is unclear, however an urban legend was formed in which, due to the high accident rate of the section, it was renamed to dispel the bad fortune brought on by the number 17, which signifies bad luck in Italy.

Until then the A16 numbering was used by the motorway section that connected Rome to Civitavecchia which, as a consequence, took on the new A12 numbering. After being decommissioned, A17 numbering was never used for any other Italian motorway.

== See also ==
- Autostrade of Italy
- Roads in Italy
- Transport in Italy

=== Other Italian roads ===
- State highways (Italy)
- Regional road (Italy)
- Provincial road (Italy)
- Municipal road (Italy)
