= Autostrada Catania-Siracusa =

Controlled-access highway in Italy

Autostrada Catania-Siracusa

Route information
- Part of E45
- Maintained by ANAS
- Existed: 2009–present

Section 1
- Length: 25.1 km (15.6 mi)
- North end: Catania
- South end: Augusta

Location
- Country: Italy
- Regions: Sicily

Highway system
- Roads in Italy; Autostrade; State; Regional; Provincial; Municipal

The Autostrada Catania-Siracusa is an autostrada (Italian for "motorway") 25.1 kilometres (15.6 mi) long in Italy in eastern Sicily that connects the cities of Catania and Syracuse. It is part of the E45 European route.

== History ==
Completed in 2009, the motorway links the RA15 (Catania's bypass) to the SS114 main road to Syracuse. The northern part (12 km) of this stretch of new motorway, from the RA15 to the exit Ragusa-Lentini was opened 28 July 2009 and the remaining 13 km (Lentini-Augusta) were opened on 9 December 2009.

== Catania-Augusta ==
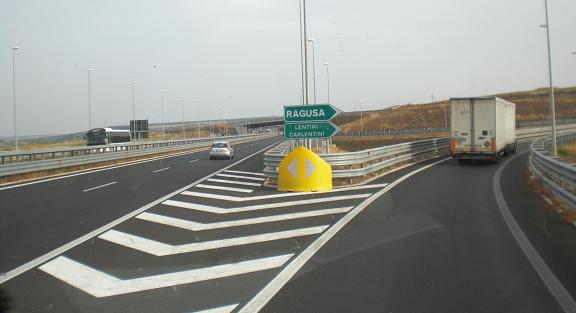
Autostrada Catania-Siracusa near Ragusa.

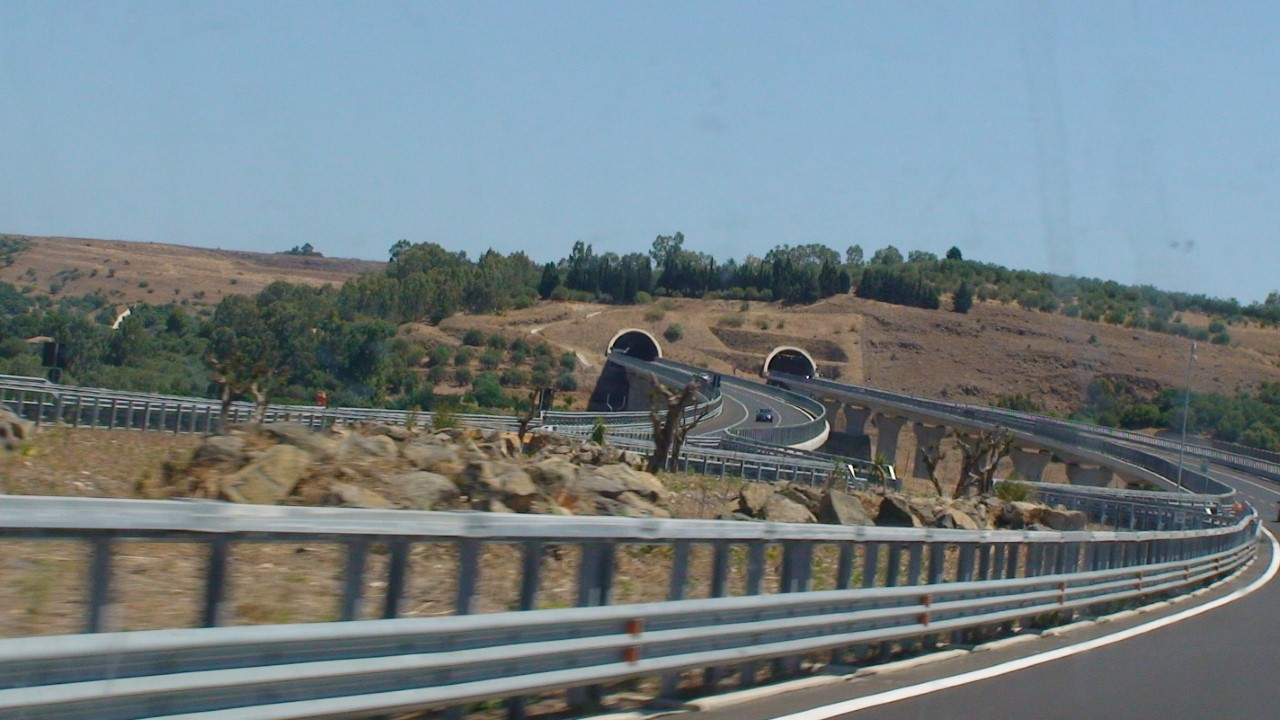
Autostrada Catania-Siracusa near Augusta.

CATANIA – SIRACUSA
Exit	↓km↓	↑km↑	Province	European Route
RA15 – Catania's Bypass	0.0 km (0 mi)	47.7 km (29.6 mi)	CT	E45
Rest area "San Demetrio"	11.3 km (7.0 mi)	36.4 km (22.6 mi)	SR	E45
Ragusa; Lentini-Carlentini	12.5 km (7.8 mi)	25.2 km (15.7 mi)	SR	E45
National road to Syracuse	25.1 km (15.6 mi)	22.6 km (14.0 mi)	SR	E45

== Augusta – Syracuse ==
The motorway is connected to Siracusa through Strada statale 114 Orientale Sicula, a dual carriageway that will need restyling before it can be upgraded to motorway, then it becomes Autostrada A18 Siracusa-Ispica

SS.114 Augusta–Siracusa
Exit	↓km↓	↑km↑	Province	European
Autostrada Catania-Siracusa	25.1 km (15.6 mi)	22.6 km (14.0 mi)	SR	E45
Villasmundo – Augusta di Augusta – Augusta	26.1 km (16.2 mi)	21.6 km (13.4 mi)	SR	E45
Zona industriale di Augusta – Sortino; Industrial area	29.0 km (18.0 mi)	18.7 km (11.6 mi)	SR	E45
Zona industriale di Melilli – Priolo; Industrial area	32.5 km (20.2 mi)	15.2 km (9.4 mi)	SR	E45
Rest area Priolo est	34.7 km (21.6 mi)	13.0 km (8.1 mi)	SR	E45
Priolo Gargallo Sorciaro	35.7 km (22.2 mi)	12.0 km (7.5 mi)	SR	E45
Rest area Priolo ovest	42.0 km (26.1 mi)	5.7 km (3.5 mi)	SR	E45
Siracusa nord Belvedere – Floridia – Solarino	42.7 km (26.5 mi)	5.0 km (3.1 mi)	SR	E45
Siracusa; Siracusana	47.7 km (29.6 mi)	0.0 km (0 mi)	SR	E45
Siracusa-Ispica	47.7 km (29.6 mi)	0.0 km (0 mi)	SR	E45

== See also ==
- Autostrade of Italy
- Roads in Italy
- Transport in Italy

=== Other Italian roads ===
- State highways (Italy)
- Regional road (Italy)
- Provincial road (Italy)
- Municipal road (Italy)
