= Speed limits in Italy =

Road speed limits in Italy are used to define the maximum legal speed limit for road vehicles using public roads in Italy. The speed limit in each location is usually indicated on a nearby traffic sign. Signs show speed limits in kilometres per hour (km/h).

== Speed limits ==
Road	Limit	Notes
Autostrada (type A); Motorway		There are legal provisions enabling the operators to set the limit to 150 km/h on their concessions on a voluntary basis, only if some conditions are met: 3 lanes in each direction, SICVE (also called Safety Tutor) speed camera system etc, but any speed exceeding 130km/h (and "no speed limit") has never been adopted due to safety concerns.
Autostrada (type A); Motorway		Maximum speed limit (Mandatory by law).
Autostrada (type A); Motorway		The limit is 110 km/h in case of rain or snow.
Strada extraurbana principale (type B); Main extra-urban road		
Strada extraurbana principale (type B); Main extra-urban road		The limit is 90 km/h in case of rain or snow.
Strada extraurbana secondaria (type C); Secondary extra-urban road or +		
Strada urbana di scorrimento (type D); Urban highway + or + +		
Strada urbana (type E); Urban road or +		
Zona 30		For instance in Torino.

Some special speed limits apply to certain vehicles, including;

Mopeds: 45 km/h

Quadricycles: 80 km/h outside built up areas

Road trains referred to in article 54, paragraph 1, letters h, i, and l: 70 km/h outside built up areas, 80 km/h on motorways

Buses and trolleybuses with a gross vehicle mass exceeding 8 t: 80 km/h outside built up areas, 100 km/h on motorways

== Sources ==
- Italian Highway Code (Codice della Strada)
