= Strade extraurbane principali =

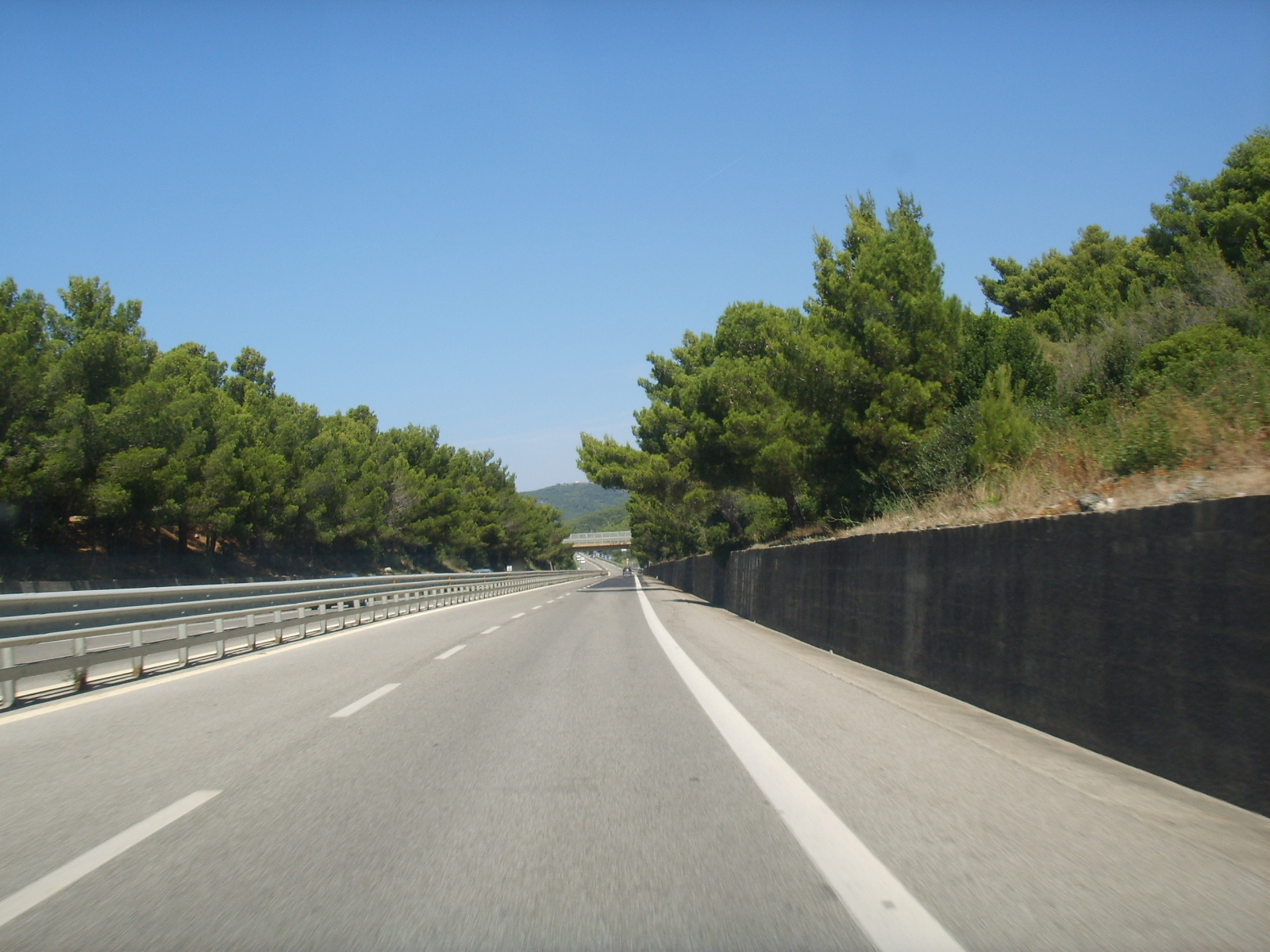
The stretch from Grosseto to Livorno of the Strada statale 1 Via Aurelia is classified as strada extraurbana principale.

The strade extraurbane principali ("main extra-urban road"; sg.: strada extraurbana principale) or type B road, better known as a "superstrada", are a type of roads of Italy defined within the Italian Highway Code.

== Characteristics ==
Road with independent carriageways or separated by an impassable traffic island, each with at least two lanes and wharf on the right, without at-grade intersections, with coordinated access to lateral properties, characterized by the appropriate start and end signs, reserved for the circulation of certain categories of motor vehicles; suitable spaces must be provided for any other categories of users. It must be equipped with special rest areas, which include parking spaces, with accesses equipped with deceleration and acceleration lanes.

— Legislative decree n. 285 of 30 April 1992, article 2, regarding the "New Highway Code"

Therefore, compared to motorways, roads of this type have some technical differences (for example the minimum width of the emergency lane but not of the travel lanes), the color of the signs (blue background instead of green), the speed limit for cars and motorcycles (110 km/h (68 mph)), the radius of curvature, the presence of the emergency lane and the presence of SOS columns. For transit on main extra-urban roads, unlike many motorways, there is currently no toll system, except for the Pedemontana Veneta.

== Transit restrictions ==
Warning sign of the start of the strada extraurbana principale where some restrictions are indicated

The circulation of the following vehicles on the autostrade and roads referred to in paragraph 1 is prohibited:

- cycles, scooters, mopeds, motorcycles with a displacement of less than 150 cm^{3} (9.2 cu in) if with a combustion engine, or with a power of less than 11 kW (15 hp) if with an electric motor, and motorbikes with a displacement of less than 250 cm^{3} (15 cu in) if with a combustion engine;
- other motor vehicles with an unladen mass of up to 400 kg (880 lb) or a total mass of up to 1,300 kg (2,900 lb), with the exception of tricycles, with a displacement of not less than 250 cm^{3} (15 cu in) if with a combustion engine and in any case with a power of not less than 15 kW (20 hp), intended for the transport of people and with a maximum of one passenger in addition to the driver;
- vehicles not equipped with tyres;
- agricultural machines and operating machines;
- vehicles with disorganized loads that are not solidly secured or which protrude beyond the permitted limits;
- non-watertight vehicles with uncovered cargo, if they transport materials susceptible to dispersion;
- vehicles whose load or dimensions exceed the limits set by articles 61 and 62, with the exception of the cases provided for by art. 10;
- vehicles whose conditions of use, equipment and tires may constitute a danger to traffic;
- vehicles with cargo not properly positioned and secured.

The movement of pedestrians and animals is prohibited, except for service areas and rest areas. In these areas animals can circulate only if duly guarded. Pedestrians are only allowed to pass along the emergency lanes to reach the emergency call points. On carriageways, ramps, junctions, service or parking areas and in any other motorway area it is prohibited:

- tow vehicles other than trailers;
- request or grant passages.

These restrictions are the same as those that apply along Italian motorways. Roadside assistance is permitted, as along motorways, only to authorized companies. Furthermore, the circulation of pedestrians and animals is only permitted within the service areas and rest areas.

== Speed limits ==
General maximum speed limit sign

On strada extraurbana principale, the speed limit for cars, motorcycles and trucks with a laden mass not exceeding 3.5 t (3.4 long tons; 3.9 short tons) is 110 km/h (68 mph), unless otherwise indicated, for buses with a laden mass between 3.5 t (3.4 long tons; 3.9 short tons) and 8 t (7.9 long tons; 8.8 short tons) and for trucks with a laden mass between 3.5 t (3.4 long tons; 3.9 short tons) and 12 t (12 long tons; 13 short tons) it is 80 km/h (50 mph), for trucks with a higher laden mass to 12 t (12 long tons; 13 short tons) and for vehicles towing trailers it is 70 km/h (43 mph). For other categories of motor vehicles, the limit is lower and depends on the type of vehicle.

== Administrative classification and signage ==
The strade extraurbana principali do not follow a specific nomenclature; they are classified administratively as Italian state roads, Italian regional roads, Italian provincial roads or Italian municiapal roads. Therefore, some state, regional, provincial, municipal roads may have sections technically classified as strade extraurbana principali (type B road), others as strade extraurbane secondarie ("secondary extra-urban roads; type C road) and still others as urban roads (type D and E roads).

Along the strade extraurbana principali the background of the road signs (both of the indication signs and for example of the mileage signs panels) are blue, therefore not different from the signs installed along the strade extraurbane secondarie.

== Types of homologous roads in other countries ==
In other European states, what in Italy are known as the strade extraurbana principali, roads with separate carriageways with two or more lanes in each direction, without at-grade intersections, are not classified as highways, but in different ways. For example:

- voies rapides (France);
- gelbe Autobahn (Germany);
- autovías (Spain);
- hitre ceste (Slovenia).

== See also ==
- Transport in Italy
- Roads in Italy
- Autostrade of Italy
- State highway (Italy)
- Regional road (Italy)
- Provincial road (Italy)
- Municipal road (Italy)
