= Canalicchio =

- Frazione
- Location of Canalicchio in Italy
- Country: Italy
- Region: Sicily
- Province: Catania (CT)
- Comune: Tremestieri Etneo

Population
  - Total: 5,843
- Time zone: UTC+1 (CET)
  - Summer (DST): UTC+2 (CEST)
- Postal code: 84051

Canalicchio is a frazione of the comune of Tremestieri Etneo in the Metropolitan City of Catania, Sicily, southern Italy. It is located very close to the city of Catania.
