= European route E932 =

Road in trans-European E-road network

E932

Route information
- Length: 161 km (100 mi)

Major junctions
- From: Buonfornello
- To: Catania

Location
- Countries: Italy

Highway system
- International E-road network; A Class; B Class

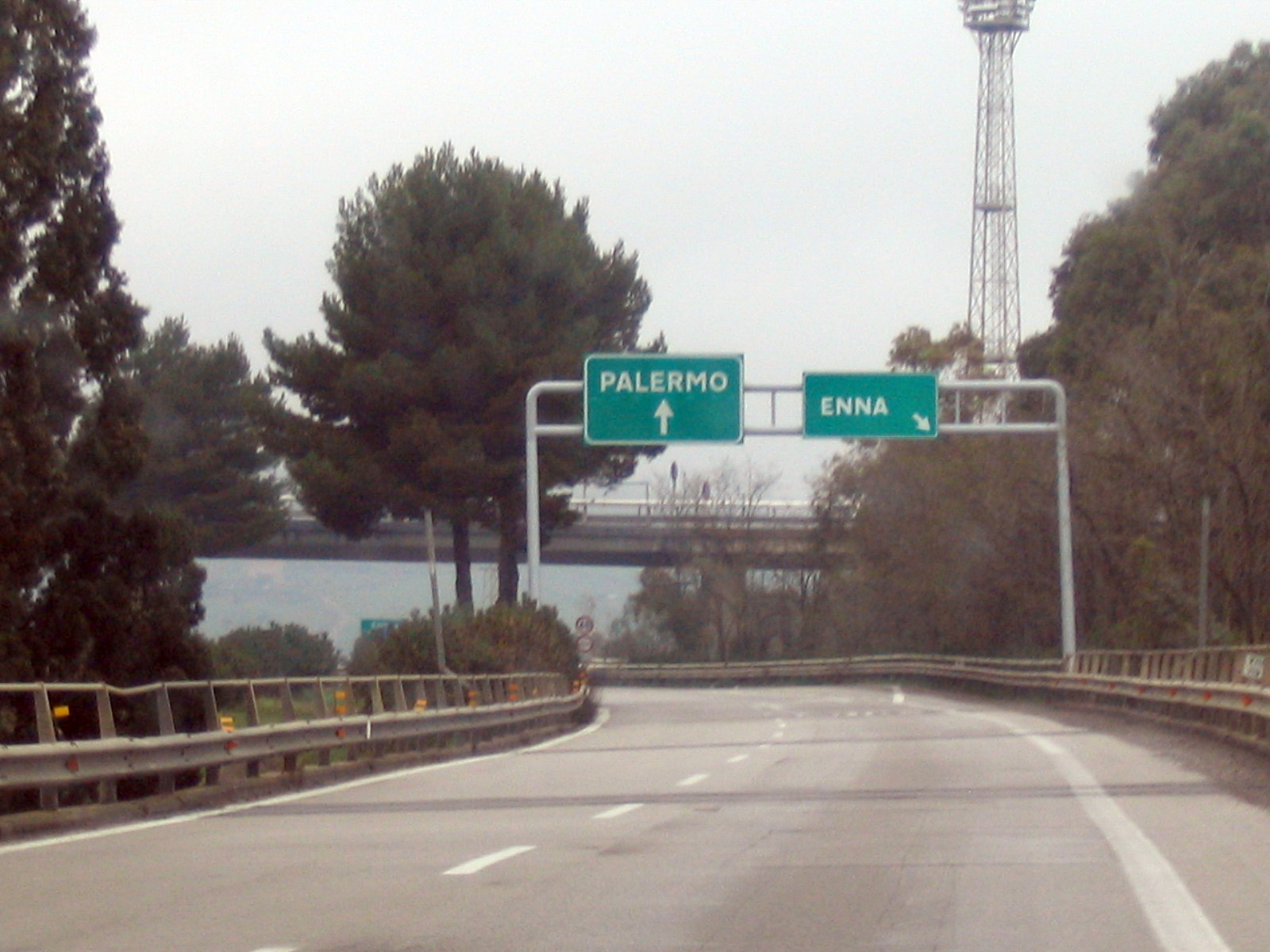
European route 932 near Enna.

European route E 932 is a European B class road in Italy, connecting the hamlet of Buonfornello (in the municipality of Termini Imerese) and Catania.

== Route ==
- Italy
  - Buonfornello
  - Catania
