= Provincial road (Italy) =

Provincial road system of Italy

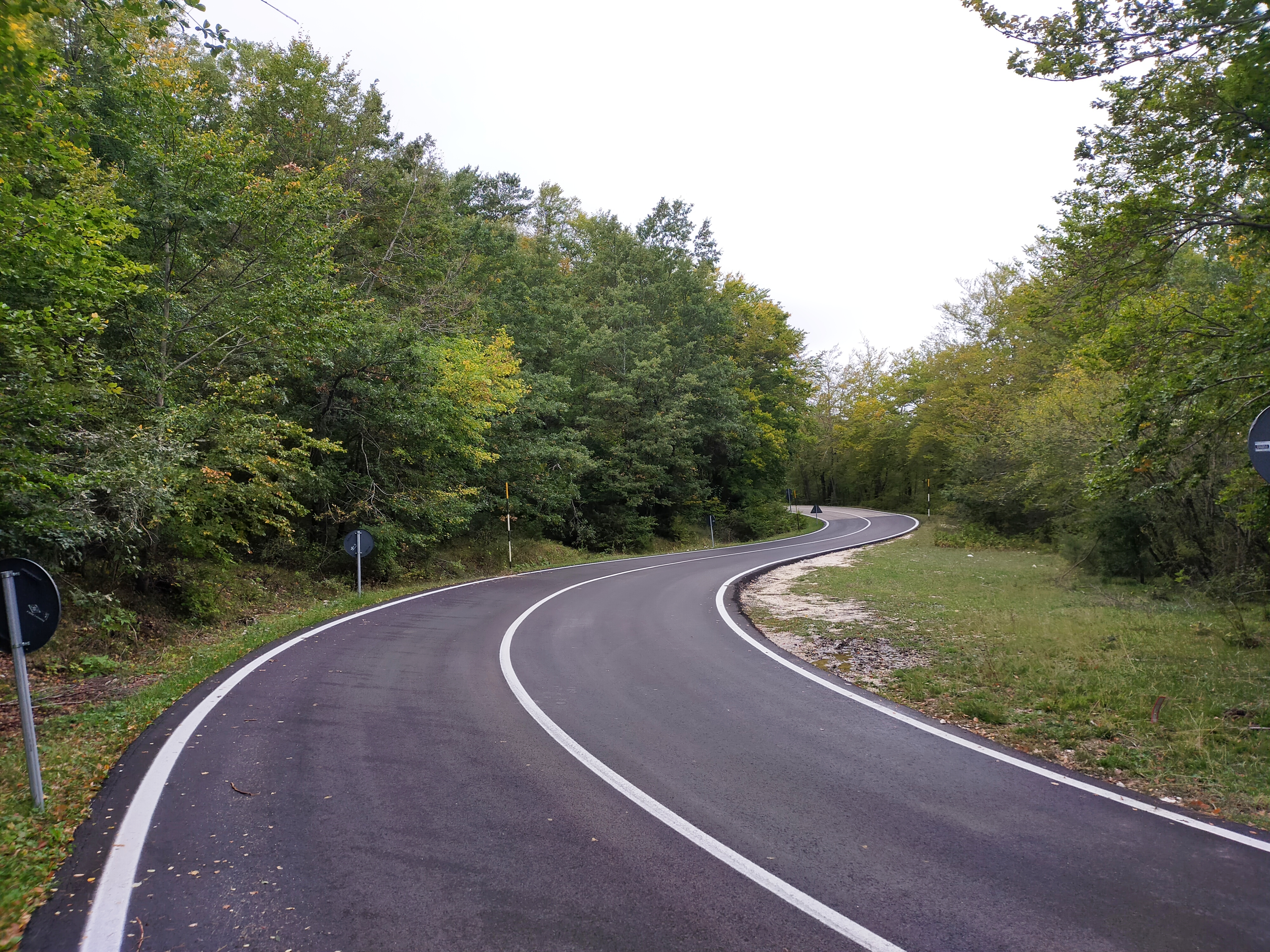
Provincial road number 17 (SP 17) in the province of L'Aquila (Abruzzo region)

A strada provinciale (Italian for provincial road; pl. "strade provinciali"), abbreviated SP, is an Italian road that is maintained by provinces or metropolitan cities. In Veneto from 2002, state highways downgraded as provincial roads are maintained by the regional company Veneto Strade. A provincial road is less important than a regional road, but more important than municipal roads. The types of provincial roads are the same as those of state highways.

== Description ==
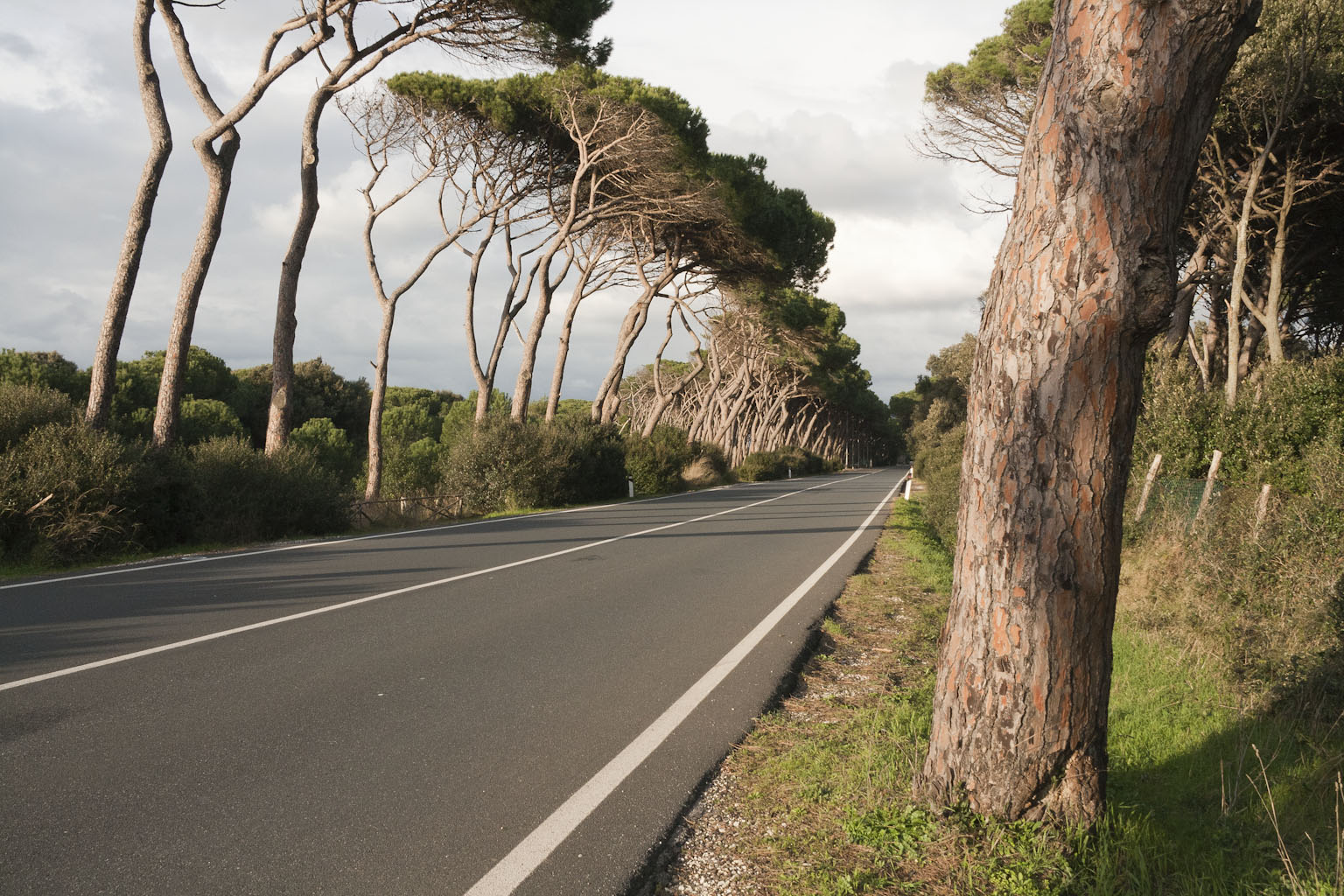
Provincial road number 23 (SP 23) in the province of Livorno (Tuscany region)

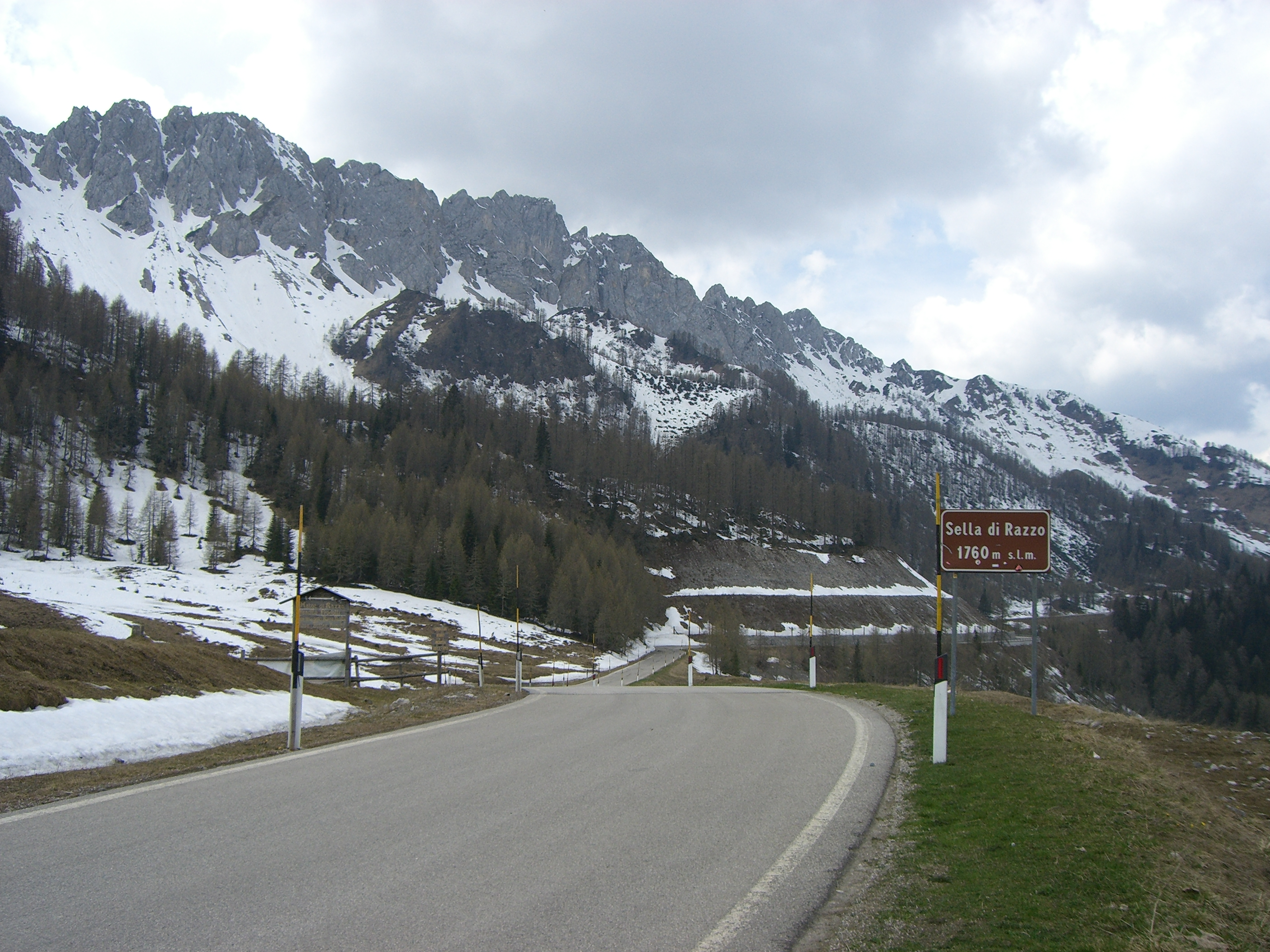
Provincial road number 619 (SP 619) in the provincia di Belluno (Veneto region)

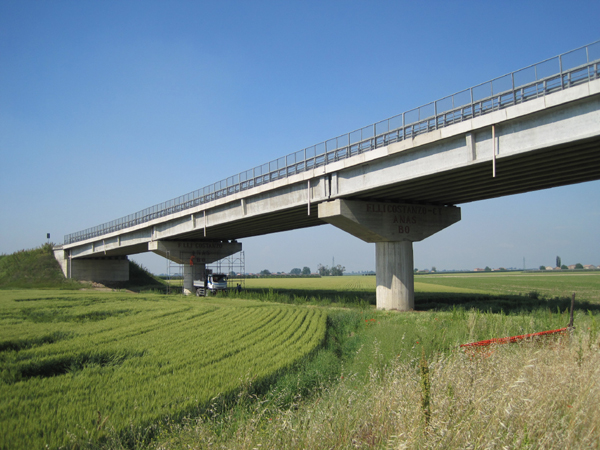
Provincial road number 468 (SP 468) in the province of Modena (Emilia-Romagna region)

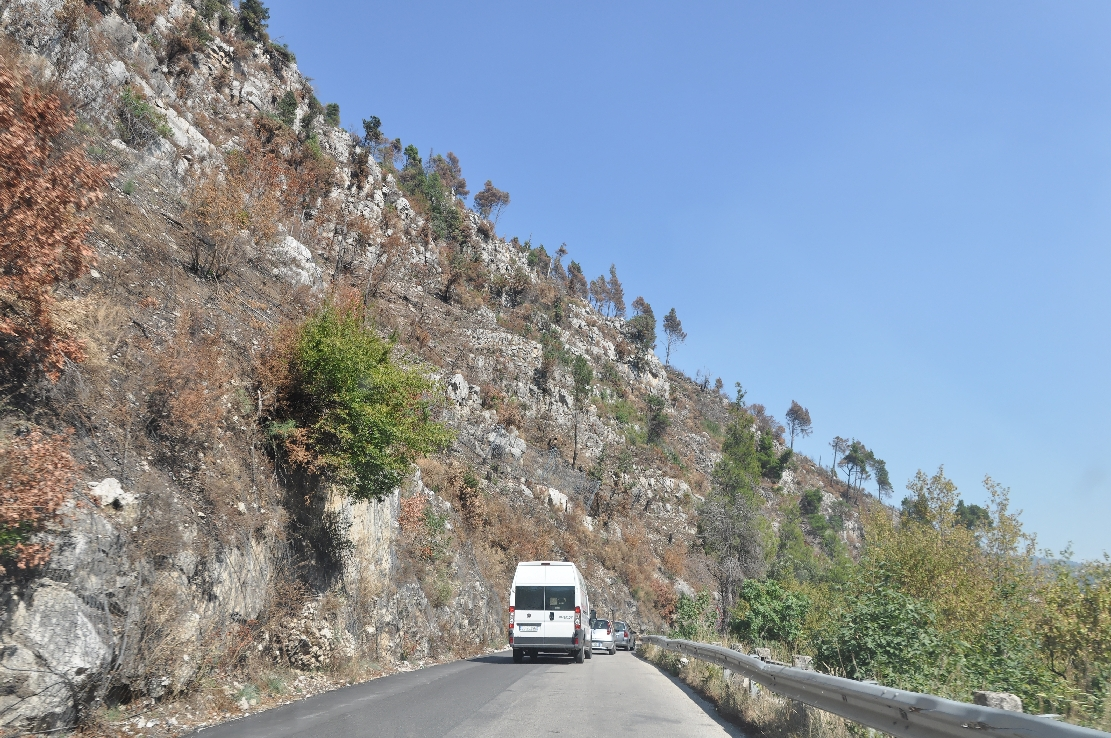
Provincial road number 76 (SP 76) in the province of Benevento (Campania region)

Before the entry into force of the new Italian Traffic Code (legislative decree n° 285 of 30 April 1992) the provincial classification of a road had to take place by decree of the Minister of Public Works; over the years, this has made the same procedures too centralized and therefore slower and more difficult, until the new highway code assigned the competence on classification to the regions (Veneto, however, has further devolved the competences of classification and declassification to the provinces themselves).

In the autonomous province of Bolzano, provincial roads are labelled with the word "Landesstraße". The name generally used is "Landesstraße - Strada Provinciale" or, for short, "LS SP".

In the Aosta Valley region, there are no provincial roads as the region has no provinces. An example is the SP50 of Colle del Nivolet, which ceases to be a provincial road when it enters the Aosta Valley territory.

== Technical classifications ==
Provincial road is an administrative classification. The provincial road can be technically classified as strade extraurbane principali (type B road; "main extra-urban roads") or as strade extraurbane secondarie (type C road; "secondary extra-urban roads") or as strade locali extraurbane (type F road; "local extra-urban roads").

If they cross inhabited centres with a population exceeding 10,000 inhabitants, they are roads under municipal jurisdiction and therefore urban (types D and E). If they pass through centres or inhabited areas with a population equal to or less than 10,000 inhabitants, they are urban (type D, E or F), but the responsibility lies with the province.

== Legal definitions ==
According to a more extensive description provided by the law No. 126 12 February 1958, provincial roads were roads which:

a) connect to the provincial capital, the capitals of the individual municipalities of the respective province or to several capitals of municipalities between them;

b) connect to the state and provincial network the capitals of municipalities that are particularly important in terms of population, or because they are home to notable industries or because they are centres of intense commercial activity or because they are climatic or tourist centres of notable importance;

c) connect provincial or municipal capitals to the nearest airports, railway stations, sea, lake or river ports;

d) constitute direct and important connections between provincial roads, or are recognised as necessary for the valorisation of important agricultural activities

— Law n°126 of 12 February 1958, article 4

which has become, with the new Italian Traffic Code:

The roads are provincial when they connect to the provincial capital the capitals of the individual municipalities of the respective province or several capitals of municipalities together or when they connect the capitals of municipalities to the state or regional network, if this is particularly relevant for industrial reasons, commercial, agricultural, tourist and climatic.

— Italian Traffic Code

== Nomenclature ==
Road sign in use since 1992

Road sign in use from 1979 to 1992

Road sign in use until 1979

Provincial roads are identified by a number. In road signs and maps, the number is preceded by the acronym SP, an acronym for strada provinciale ("provincial road"). In road signs, the alphanumeric acronym is enclosed in a blue rectangle with a white background.

== See also ==
- Transport in Italy
- Roads in Italy

=== Other Italian roads ===
- Autostrade of Italy
- State highways (Italy)
- Regional road (Italy)
- Municipal road (Italy)
