= Regional road (Italy) =

Regional road system of Italy

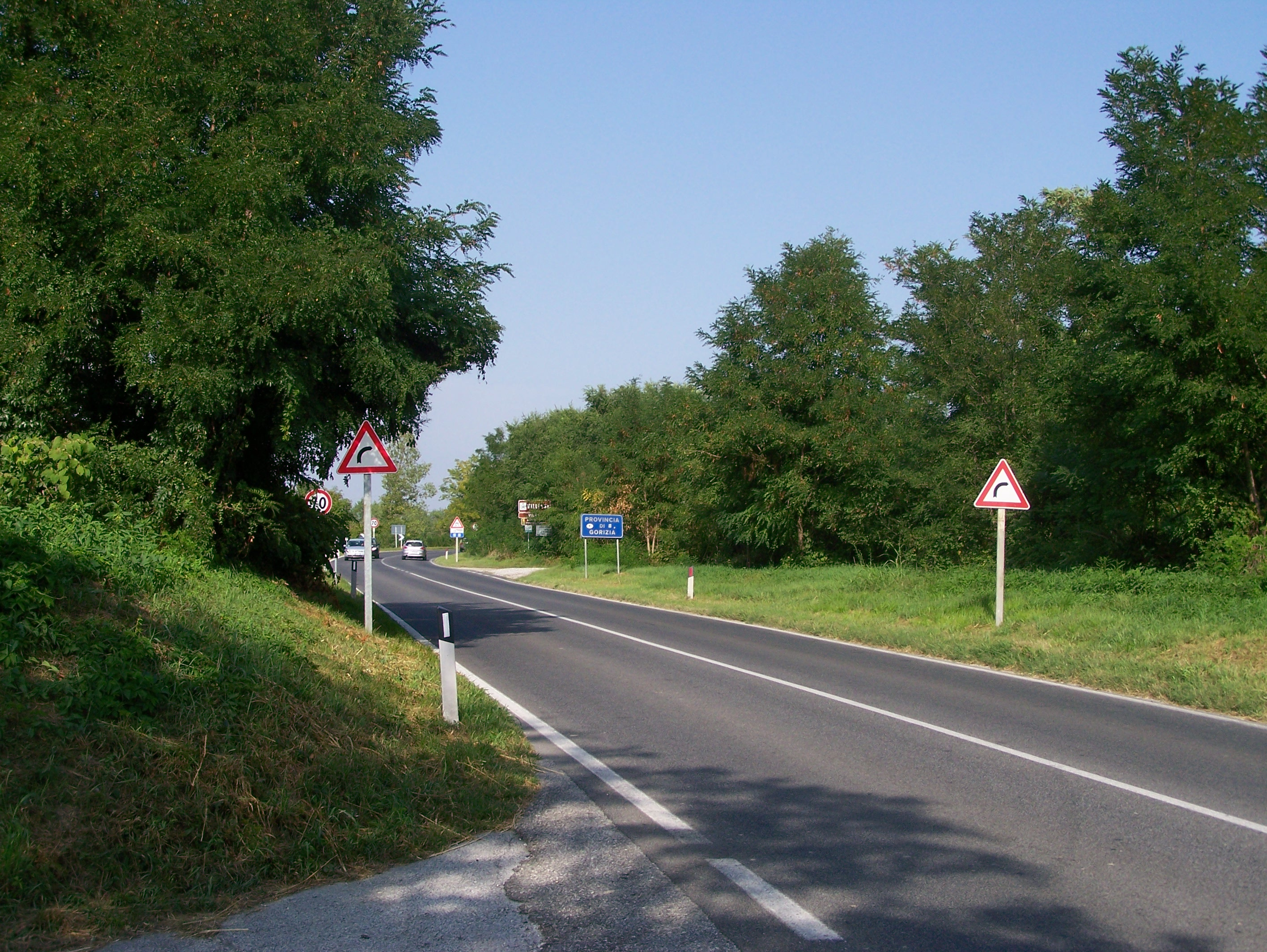
Regional road number 351 (SR 351) in Friuli-Venezia Giulia

A strada regionale (Italian for regional road; pl. "strade regionali"), abbreviated SR, is a type of Italian road maintained by the regions they traverse. In the administrative hierarchy, a regional road is less important than a state highway, but more important than a provincial road.

== Description ==
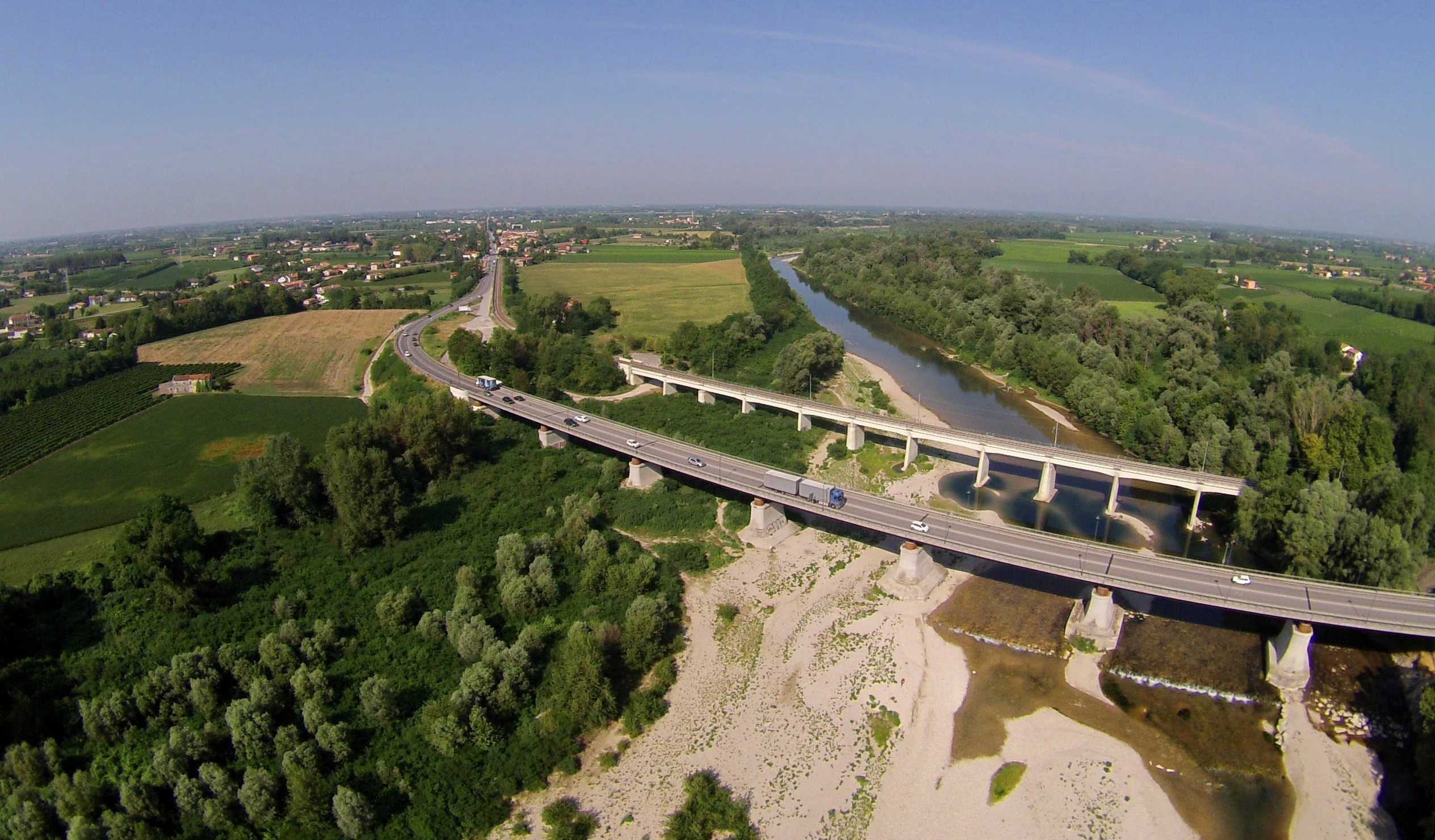
Regional road number 53 (SR 53) in Veneto

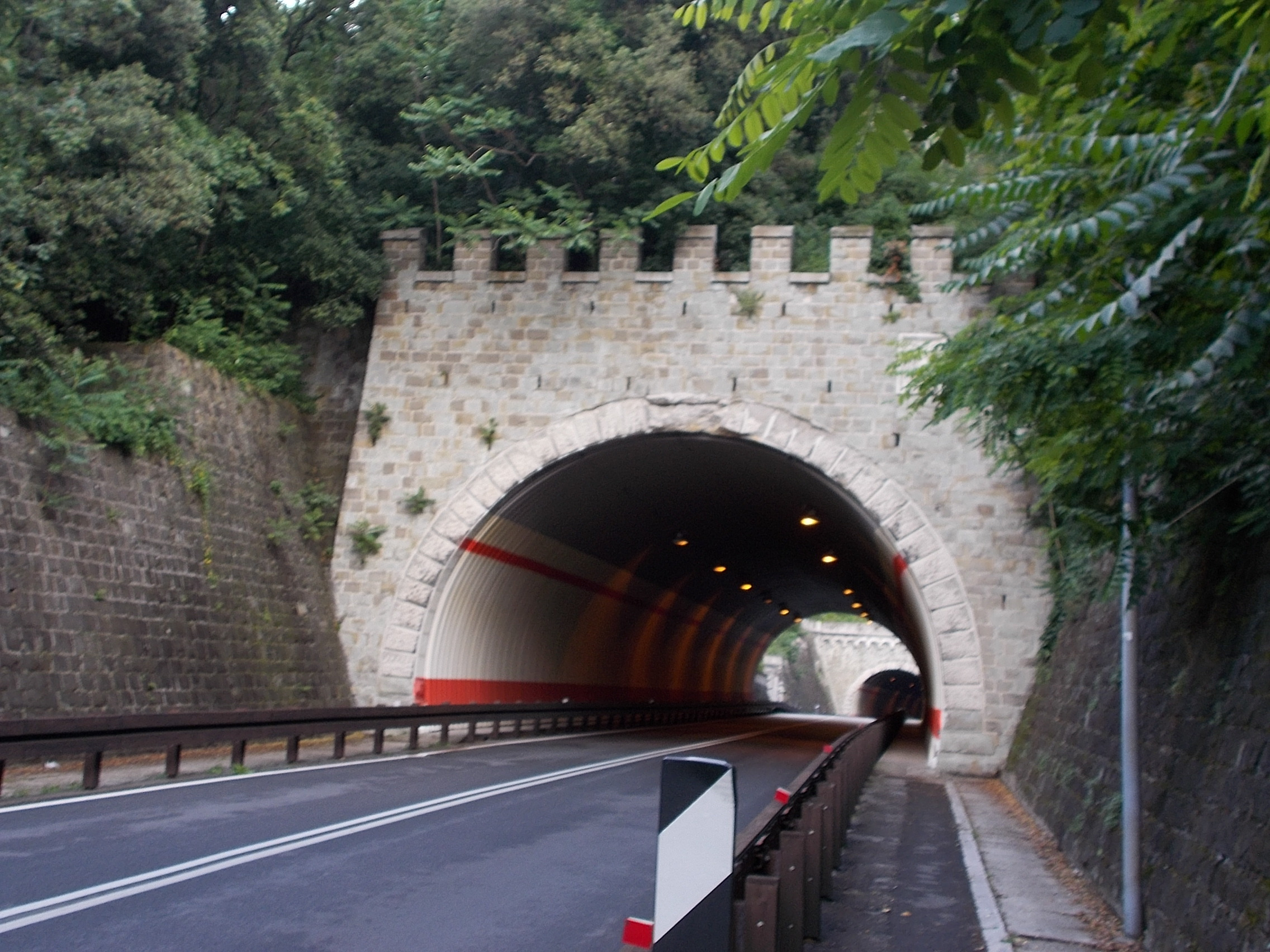
Regional road number 14 (SR 14) in Friuli-Venezia Giulia

The concept of regional road was introduced for the first time in Italy, limited to the autonomous region of Aosta Valley (where no provincial body exists), with regional law no. 1 of 10 October 1950.

The concept was then extended to a national level by legislative decree nº 285 of 30 April 1992 (New Italian Traffic Law) which defines it as:

Regional road: when it connects the provincial capitals of the same region to each other or with the regional capital or connects the provincial capitals or municipalities with the state network if this is particularly relevant for industrial, commercial, agricultural, tourist and climate.

— Italian Traffic Law

The first roads (excluding Aosta Valley) classified as SR (acronym for strada regionale; "regional road") were created in 2001 following legislative decree no. 112 of 1998. In particular, articles 99 and 101 provided for the transfer of ownership and responsibilities relating to state highways not included in the national road network from the State to the regions, which then regulated the matter autonomously. For organizational reasons, many regions have entrusted the former state highways to the provinces, while maintaining the acronym SR.

In addition to these regional roads created following the downgrading of the state network, there are regional roads immediately classified as such (for example SR 6 in Apulia although subsequently downgraded to provincial) or former provincial regional roads such as SR 89, ex SP 62, in Veneto.

The regional roads can be technically classified as strade extraurbane principali (type B road; "main extra-urban roads") or as strade extraurbane secondarie (type C road; "secondary extra-urban roads"). If they cross inhabited centers with a population greater than 9,999 inhabitants, they are roads under municipal jurisdiction and therefore urban (type D and E). If they pass through centers or inhabited areas with a population of less than 9,999 inhabitants, they are urban (type D and E), but the responsibility remains with the manager.

In addition to the roads identified by the acronym SR, there are roads managed by the region but identified by the acronym SP (for example, many SPs in the province of Belluno are managed by the Veneto Strade company with a 30% stake in the region of the same name).

== Nomenclature ==
Road marker for regional roads in Italy

Regional roads are identified by a number. In road signs and maps the number is preceded by the acronym SR, an acronym for strada regionale ("regional road"). In road signs the alphanumeric acronym is enclosed in a blue rectangle with a white acronym.

== See also ==
- Transport in Italy
- Roads in Italy

=== Other Italian roads ===
- Autostrade of Italy
- State highways (Italy)
- Provincial road (Italy)
- Municipal road (Italy)
