= Strada statale 115 Sud Occidentale Sicula =

State highway in Italy

State Highway 115
- Strada statale 115
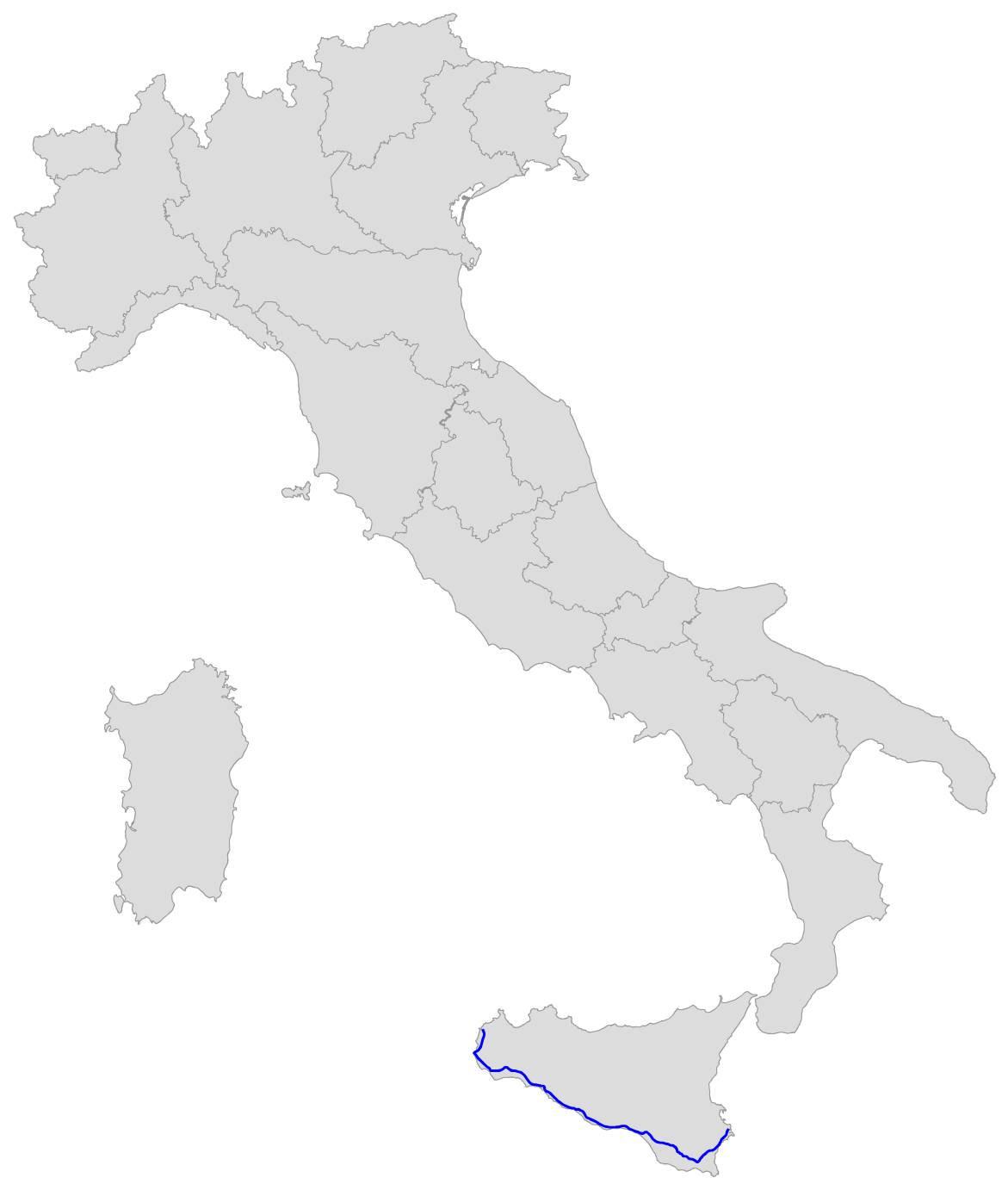

Route information
- Part of E45 and E931
- Maintained by ANAS
- Length: 395.7 km (245.9 mi)
- Existed: 1928–present

Major junctions
- From: Trapani
- To: Syracuse

Location
- Country: Italy
- Regions: Sicily
- Major cities: Trapani, Agrigento, Gela, Ragusa, Syracuse

Highway system
- Roads in Italy; Autostrade; State; Regional; Provincial; Municipal
← SS 114 dir	→ SS 115 dir

The Strada statale 115 Sud Occidentale Sicula (SS115) is an Italian state highway 395.7 kilometres (245.9 mi) long in Italy located in the regions of Sicily. It is one of the major roads in Sicily. It is the major state highway running along the south coast and connects the towns of Trapani and Syracuse via Agrigento and Ragusa. It is a part of the European route E45 and European route E931.

== Major cities on route ==
- Trapani
- Marsala
- Mazara del Vallo
- Castelvetrano
- Sciacca
- Agrigento
- Licata
- Gela
- Vittoria
- Comiso
- Ragusa
- Modica
- Rosolini
- Noto
- Avola
- Syracuse

== Route ==
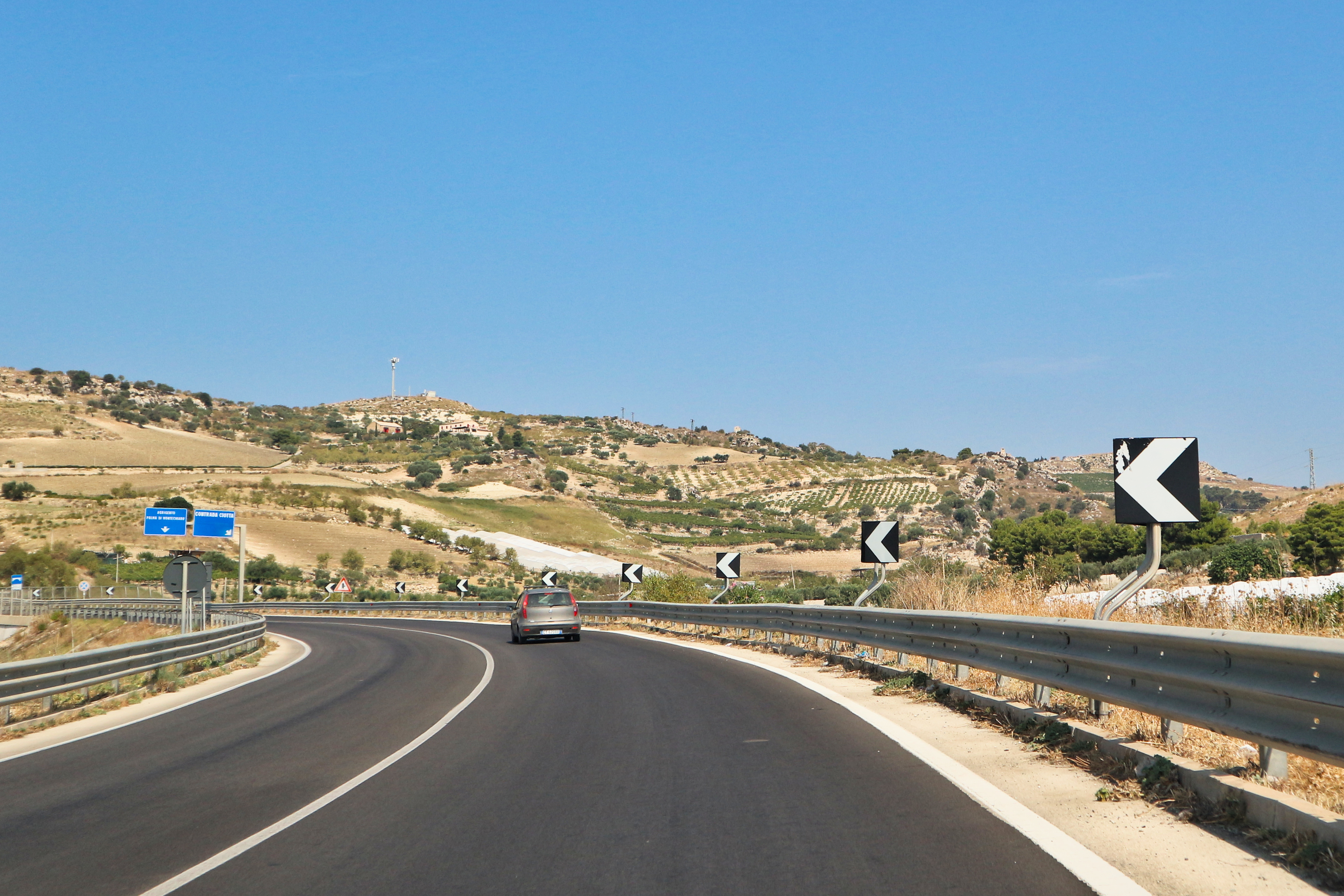
Strada statale 115 Sud Occidentale Sicula in Palma di Montechiaro

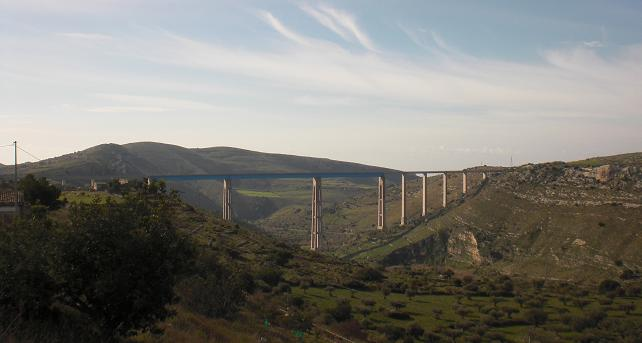
Strada statale 115 Sud Occidentale Sicula in Ragusa

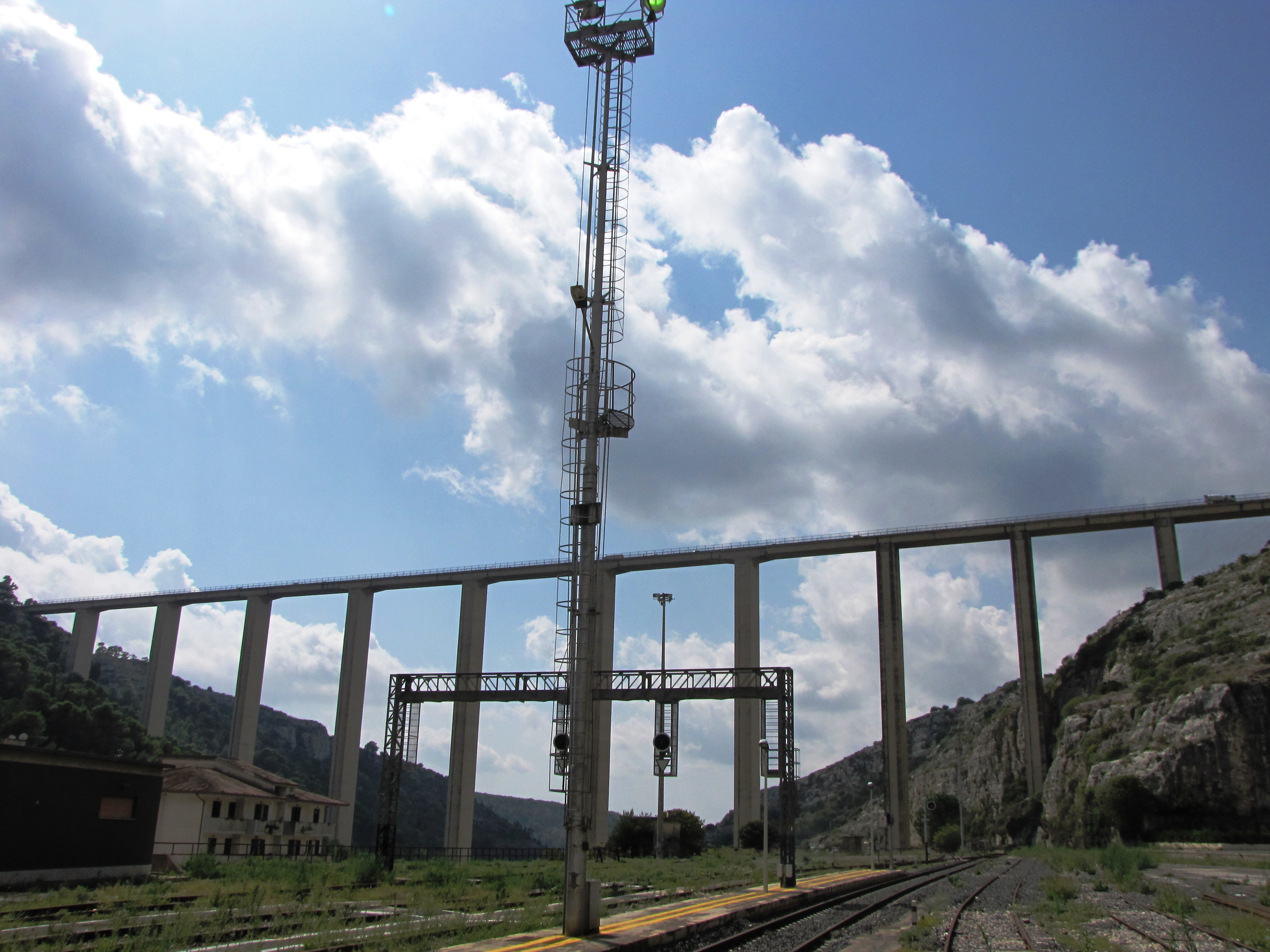
Strada statale 115 Sud Occidentale Sicula in Modica

Sud Occidentale Sicula
Exit	↓km↓	Province
Trapani; Via Marsala di Castellammare del Golfo	0.0 km (0 mi)	TP
Scorrimento Villa Rosina for Diramazione Alcamo-Trapani	1.6 km (0.99 mi)	TP
Xitta	3.0 km (1.9 mi)	TP
Paceco	5.0 km (3.1 mi)	TP
Diramazione per Birgi	8.7 km (5.4 mi)	TP
Fontanasalsa	9.0 km (5.6 mi)	TP
Guarrato	10.7 km (6.6 mi)	TP
Rilievo	14.0 km (8.7 mi)	TP
Scorrimento veloce Trapani-Marsala		TP
Granatello	19.0 km (11.8 mi)	TP
Scorrimento veloce Trapani-Marsala		TP
Tabaccaro	23.0 km (14.3 mi)	TP
Addolorata		TP
Marsala Centro Occidentale Sicula	32.3 km (20.1 mi)	TP
Terrenove		TP
Strasatti	43.0 km (26.7 mi)	TP
Raccordo di Mazara del Vallo; C.da Bianca Giancreco - C.da Ponte Giangreco	49.1 km (30.5 mi)	TP
for Ponte San Lorenzo, Xitta; Mazara del Vallo	49.7 km (30.9 mi)	TP
Mazara del Vallo; Mazara Due	50.3 km (31.3 mi)	TP
Palermo-Mazara del Vallo	51.0 km (31.7 mi)	TP
Mazara del Vallo	52.5 km (32.6 mi)	TP
Lake Preola and Gorghi Tondi nature reserve di Gorghi Tondi		TP
C.da San Nicola		TP
San Nicola di Mazara railway station		TP
Campobello di Mazara	65.3 km (40.6 mi)	TP
Campobello di Mazara		TP
Palermo-Mazara del Vallo	69.9 km (43.4 mi)	TP
Castelvetrano di Gibellina	73.0 km (45.4 mi)	TP
Palermo-Mazara del Vallo	75.7 km (47.0 mi)	TP
Sud Occidentale Sicula	77.0 km (47.8 mi)	TP
Partanna di Zangara	79.7 km (49.5 mi)	TP
Belice viaduct(2051 m)	81.8 km (50.8 mi)	TP
Montevago for Porto Palo	84.9 km (52.8 mi)	AG
Menfi; Palermo-Sciacca	90.7 km (56.4 mi)	AG
Carboj viaduct	99.4 km (61.8 mi)	AG
Bivio San Bartolo Palermo-Sciacca	102.0 km (63.4 mi)	AG
Viabilità complanare	102.7 km (63.8 mi)	AG
Viabilità complanare	105.4 km (65.5 mi)	AG
Viabilità complanare C.da Bordea	109.7 km (68.2 mi)	AG
Sciacca for Caltabellotta	112.3 km (69.8 mi)	AG
Sciacca; Sciacca Port	117.0 km (72.7 mi)	AG
Sciacca for Menfi	117.3 km (72.9 mi)	AG
Sciacca est		AG
for Sant'Anna	121.3 km (75.4 mi)	AG
per Sant'Anna		AG
Verdura river		AG
di Ribera		AG
for C.da Magone, Ribera		AG
for Seccagrande, Ribera		AG
for Borgo Bonsignore, Ribera		AG
for Heraclea Minoa, Cattolica Eraclea		AG
for Montallegro		AG
Montallegro (solo direzione Trapani)		AG
per Montallegro		AG
Viadotto Canne (1241 m)	165.0 km (102.5 mi)	AG
per Siculiana, Siculiana Marina	167.9 km (104.3 mi)	AG
Siculiana	169.0 km (105.0 mi)	AG
Siculiana	169.6 km (105.4 mi)	AG
Realmonte		AG
per Scala dei Turchi, Capo Rossello	177.3 km (110.2 mi)	AG
di Porto Empedocle	178.7 km (111.0 mi)	AG
C.da Ciuccafa	180.1 km (111.9 mi)	AG
Porto Empedocle	182.5 km (113.4 mi)	AG
Sud Occidentale Sicula	183.7 km (114.1 mi)	AG
Sud Occidentale Sicula	184.5 km (114.6 mi)	AG
Svincolo Caos Strada degli Scrittori	186.5 km (115.9 mi)	AG
Sud Occidentale Sicula	183.6 km (114.1 mi)	AG
Sud Occidentale Sicula	184.3 km (114.5 mi)	AG
Sud Occidentale Sicula	184.5 km (114.6 mi)	AG
Villaseta	185.3 km (115.1 mi)	AG
Corleonese Agrigentina for Villaggio Peruzzo, San Leone	188.0 km (116.8 mi)	AG
Rotatoria Giunone Strada degli Scrittori for Agrigento; Valle dei Templi	189.2 km (117.6 mi)	AG
Villaggio Mosè	191.5 km (119.0 mi)	AG
Bivio Crocca per Favara for Strada degli Scrittori		AG
di Furore	198.1 km (123.1 mi)	AG
per C.da Cavaleri Magazzeni		AG
Palma di Montechiaro di Naro for Marina di Palma		AG
Palma di Montechiaro		AG
Palma di Montechiaro		AG
for Campobello di Licata		AG
C.da Ciotta		AG
for Torre di Gaffe		AG
Licata ovest		AG
di Licata		AG
Licata est		AG
Marina di Butera		CL
della Valle del Salso		CL
Manfria		CL
Gela ovest	259.9 km (161.5 mi)	CL
Gela for Butera		CL
Gela est Centrale Sicula; Gela petrochemical complex	267.5 km (166.2 mi)	CL
for Biviere di Gela	272.3 km (169.2 mi)	CL
Tangenziale di Gela	272.6 km (169.4 mi)	CL
for Niscemi		CL
for Caltagirone e Acate (Caltagirone-Mare)		CL/RG
Dirillo river		CL/RG
for Acate		RG
for Marina di Acate		RG
Vittoria ovest	295.3 km (183.5 mi)	RG
Vittoria for Acate	296.2 km (184.1 mi)	RG
Vittoria for Borgo Fondo Monaci	297.2 km (184.7 mi)	RG
Vittoria est for the Comiso Airport	298.8 km (185.7 mi)	RG
Comiso for the Comiso Airport for Bivio Coffa	305.0 km (189.5 mi)	RG
Sud Occidentale Sicula	314.6 km (195.5 mi)	RG
di Chiaramonte for Ragusa	314.6 km (195.5 mi)	RG
di Chiaramonte	314.6 km (195.5 mi)	RG
Sud Occidentale Sicula for Ragusa	314.6 km (195.5 mi)	RG
Rest area	317.3 km (197.2 mi)	RG
Ragusa for Santa Croce Camerina	320.5 km (199.1 mi)	RG
Industrial area of Ragusa; Ragusa-Marina di Ragusa	321.9 km (200.0 mi)	RG
Ponte Costanzo	332.2 km (206.4 mi)	RG
Ponte Guerrieri	335.9 km (208.7 mi)	RG
for Pozzallo	345.4 km (214.6 mi)	RG
Ispica	352.2 km (218.8 mi)	RG
for Pozzallo	356.0 km (221.2 mi)	RG
for Pachino	356.3 km (221.4 mi)	RG
Rosolini	359.9 km (223.6 mi)	SR
for San Paolo	370.0 km (229.9 mi)	SR
for Calabernardo, Lido di Noto	374.6 km (232.8 mi)	SR
Noto	375.9 km (233.6 mi)	SR
for Pachino	378.9 km (235.4 mi)	SR
Ring road of Avola	382.3 km (237.6 mi)	SR
Avola	383.8 km (238.5 mi)	SR
Siracusa-Gela	389.4 km (242.0 mi)	SR
for Fontane Bianche	392.7 km (244.0 mi)	SR
Siracusa–Gela–Canicattì railway	393.8 km (244.7 mi)	SR
for Floridia; Siracusa-Gela	395.0 km (245.4 mi)	SR
Cassibile	395.7 km (245.9 mi)	SR
Siracusa–Gela–Canicattì railway	401.3 km (249.4 mi)	SR
for Arenella	401.3 km (249.4 mi)	SR
for Penisola della Maddalena e Plemmirio	404.7 km (251.5 mi)	SR
Siracusa	405.7 km (252.1 mi)	SR

== See also ==
- State highways (Italy)
- Roads in Italy
- Transport in Italy

=== Other Italian roads ===
- Autostrade of Italy
- Regional road (Italy)
- Provincial road (Italy)
- Municipal road (Italy)
