= Autostrada A28 (Italy) =

Controlled-access highway in Italy

Autostrada A28

Route information
- Maintained by Autovie Venete S.p.A.
- Length: 48.7 km (30.3 mi)
- Existed: 1974–present

Major junctions
- South end: Portogruaro
- A4 in Portogruaro; A27 in Conegliano
- North end: Conegliano

Location
- Country: Italy
- Regions: Veneto, Friuli-Venezia Giulia

Highway system
- Roads in Italy; Autostrade; State; Regional; Provincial; Municipal
← A 27	→ A 29

The Autostrada A28 is an autostrada (Italian for "motorway") 48.7 kilometres (30.3 mi) long in Italy located in the regions of Veneto and Friuli-Venezia Giulia which connects Portogruaro to Conegliano via Pordenone.

== Route ==
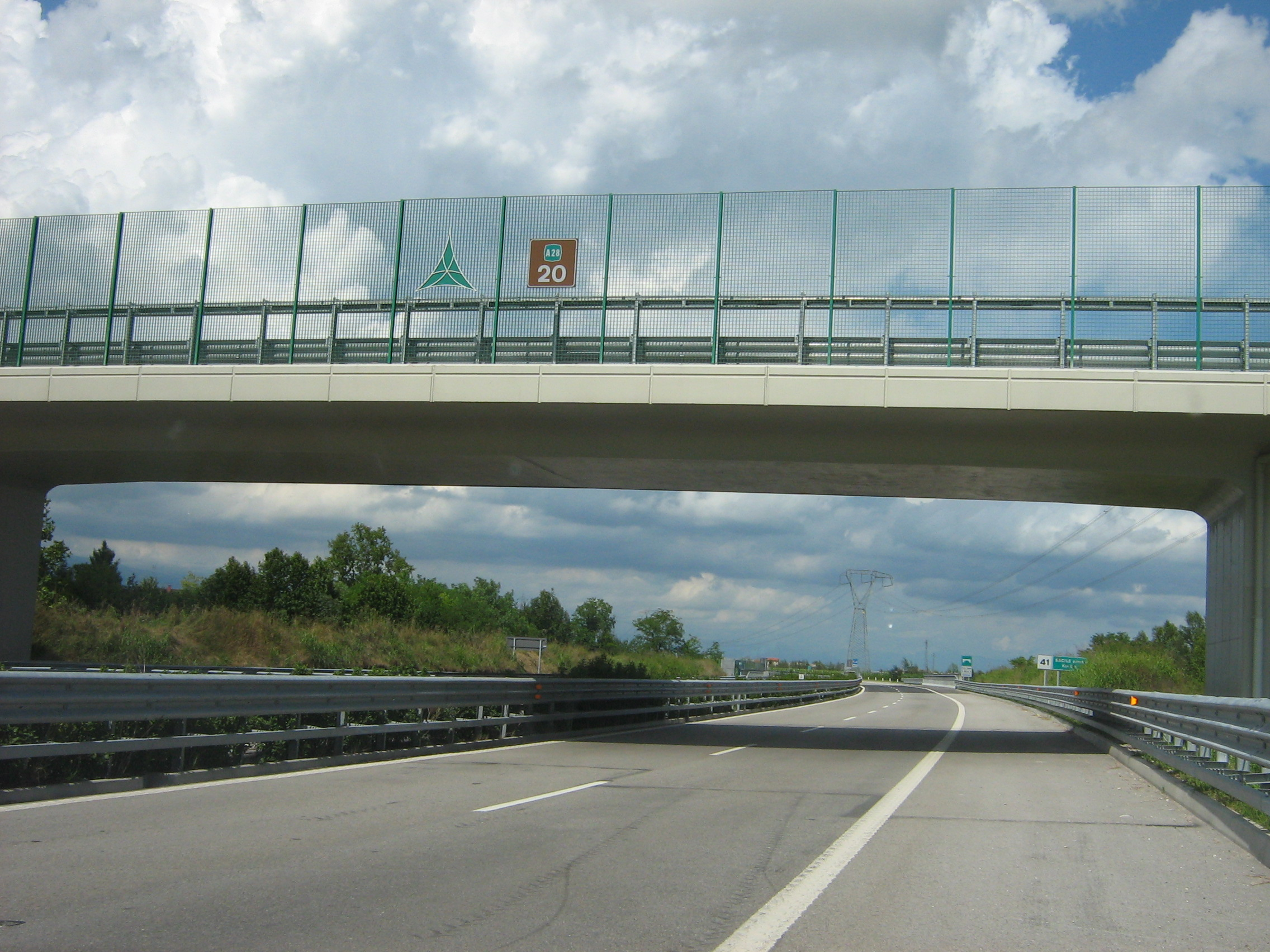
Autostrada A28 near Villotta

PORTOGRUARO - PORDENONE - CONEGLIANO
Exit	↓km↓	↑km↑	Province
Torino - Trieste	0.0 km (0 mi)	48.7 km (30.3 mi)	VE
Toll gate Portogruaro	0.7 km (0.43 mi)	48.0 km (29.8 mi)	VE
Portogruaro	1.0 km (0.62 mi)	47.7 km (29.6 mi)	VE
Rest area Gruaro	1.2 km (0.75 mi)	46.5 km (28.9 mi)	VE
Sesto al Reghena	4.7 km (2.9 mi)	44.0 km (27.3 mi)	PN
Villotta	8.7 km (5.4 mi)	40.0 km (24.9 mi)	PN
Azzano Decimo	13.9 km (8.6 mi)	34.8 km (21.6 mi)	PN
Cimpello; Raccordo Cimpello - Pian del Pan	17.2 km (10.7 mi)	31.5 km (19.6 mi)	PN
Pordenone Centro Commerciale; Shopping center Meduna	20.4 km (12.7 mi)	28.3 km (17.6 mi)	PN
Pordenone	21.5 km (13.4 mi)	27.2 km (16.9 mi)	PN
Porcia	24.4 km (15.2 mi)	24.4 km (15.2 mi)	PN
Rest area Porcia (Note: Only towards Conegliano)	29.3 km (18.2 mi)	--	PN
Rest area Brugnera (Note: Only towards Portogruaro)	--	22.0 km (13.7 mi)	PN
Fontanafredda	28.1 km (17.5 mi)	20.6 km (12.8 mi)	PN
Sacile est	31.1 km (19.3 mi)	17.6 km (10.9 mi)	PN
Sacile ovest	35.1 km (21.8 mi)	13.7 km (8.5 mi)	PN
Toll gate Cordignano	36.4 km (22.6 mi)	12.3 km (7.6 mi)	TV
Godega di Sant'Urbano	43.8 km (27.2 mi)	5.0 km (3.1 mi)	TV
Conegliano; Mestre-Pian di Vedoia	48.7 km (30.3 mi)	0.0 km (0 mi)	TV

== See also ==
- Autostrade of Italy
- Roads in Italy
- Transport in Italy

=== Other Italian roads ===
- State highways (Italy)
- Regional road (Italy)
- Provincial road (Italy)
- Municipal road (Italy)
