= Autostrada A29 (Italy) =

Controlled-access highway in Italy

Autostrada A29
- Autostrada del Sale; Salt motorway

Route information
- Part of E90 and E933
- Maintained by ANAS
- Length: 115.7 km (71.9 mi)
- Existed: 1972–present

Major junctions
- North end: Palermo
- South end: Mazara del Vallo

Location
- Country: Italy
- Regions: Sicily

Highway system
- Roads in Italy; Autostrade; State; Regional; Provincial; Municipal
← A 28	→ A 30

Autostrada A29 and its branches.

The Autostrada A29 or Autostrada del Sale ("Salt motorway") is an autostrada (Italian for "motorway") 115.7 kilometres (71.9 mi) long in Italy on the island of Sicily that links Palermo to Mazara del Vallo. It is a part of the E90 and E933 European routes.

The motorway is also called Autostrada del Sale ("Salt Motorway") because one of its branches ends at the salt pans between Marsala and Trapani. It's a four-lane motorway in its whole length. Autostrada A29 is entirely toll-free and is managed by ANAS.

A segment of the motorway near Capaci was the site of the fatal bombing on Italian magistrate Giovanni Falcone and his wife Francesca Morvillo by the Sicilian Mafia.

== Route ==
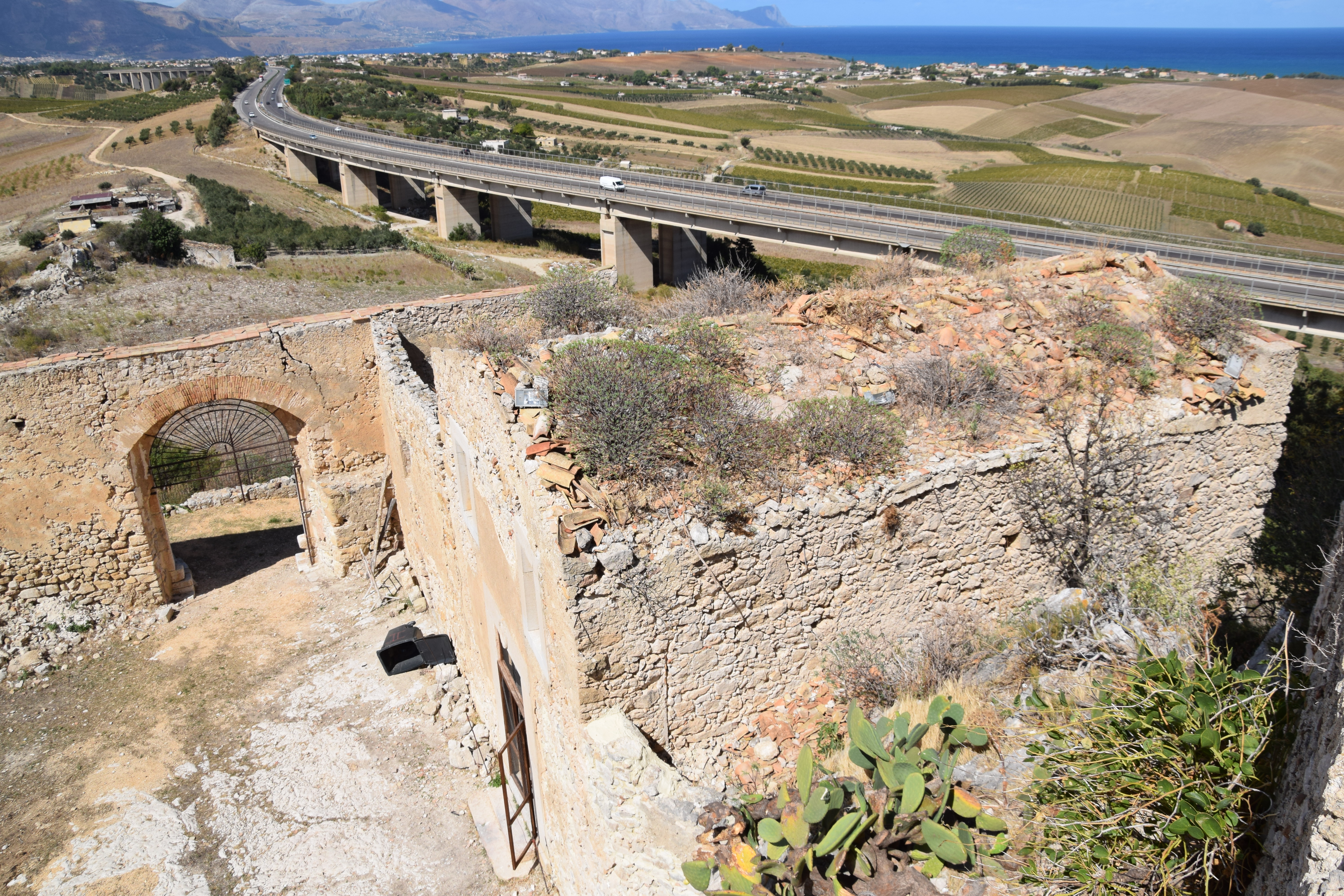
Autostrada A29 near the Calatubo Castle in Alcamo

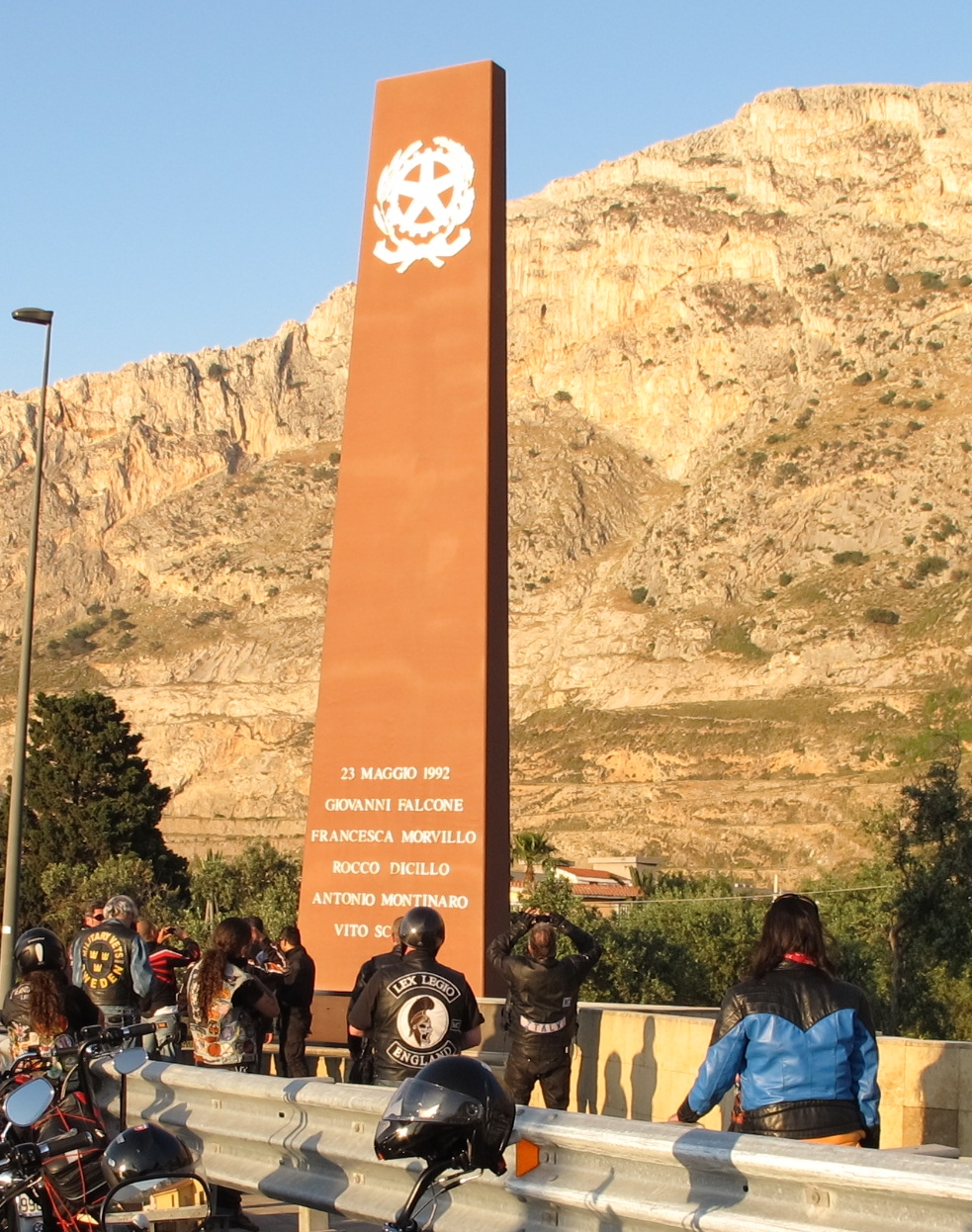
Giovanni Falcone monument near Capaci

PALERMO-MAZARA DEL VALLO; Autostrada del Sale
Exit	↓km↓	↑km↑	Province	European Route
Raccordo A29-Palermo	0.0 km (0 mi)	115.7 km (71.9 mi)	PA	E90
Tommaso Natale - Mondello	2.5 km (1.6 mi)	113.2 km (70.3 mi)	PA	E90
Capaci - Isola delle Femmine; Settentrionale Sicula	4.5 km (2.8 mi)	111.2 km (69.1 mi)	PA	E90
Carini	7.8 km (4.8 mi)	107.9 km (67.0 mi)	PA	E90
Bretella Aeroporto "Falcone e Borsellino"; Palermo International Airport	12.0 km (7.5 mi)	103.7 km (64.4 mi)	PA	E90
Villagrazia di Carini	14.3 km (8.9 mi)	101.4 km (63.0 mi)	PA	E90
Cinisi	19.1 km (11.9 mi)	95.6 km (59.4 mi)	PA	E90
Terrasini; Settentrionale Sicula	23.6 km (14.7 mi)	92.1 km (57.2 mi)	PA	E90
Montelepre	29.1 km (18.1 mi)	86.6 km (53.8 mi)	PA	E90
Partinico; Settentrionale Sicula	31.1 km (19.3 mi)	84.6 km (52.6 mi)	PA	E90
Balestrate	40.1 km (24.9 mi)	75.6 km (47.0 mi)	PA	E90
Alcamo Est; Bretella di Alcamo Est	45.4 km (28.2 mi)	70.3 km (43.7 mi)	TP	E90
Castellammare del Golfo; Bretella di Castellammare del Golfo	48.0 km (29.8 mi)	67.7 km (42.1 mi)	TP	E90
Alcamo Ovest; Bretella di Alcamo Ovest	51.7 km (32.1 mi)	64.0 km (39.8 mi)	TP	E90
Diramazione Alcamo-Trapani	53.7 km (33.4 mi)	62.0 km (38.5 mi)	TP	E90
Gallitello Calatafimi-Segesta; Segesta	65.7 km (40.8 mi)	50.0 km (31.1 mi)	TP	E90
Salemi	76.5 km (47.5 mi)	39.2 km (24.4 mi)	TP	E90
Santa Ninfa - Partanna di Gibellina	84.5 km (52.5 mi)	31.2 km (19.4 mi)	TP	E90
Castelvetrano	93.8 km (58.3 mi)	21.9 km (13.6 mi)	TP	E90
Campobello di Mazara; Sud Occidentale Sicula	98.5 km (61.2 mi)	17.2 km (10.7 mi)	TP	E90
Mazara del Vallo	114.5 km (71.1 mi)	1.2 km (0.75 mi)	TP	E90
Sud Occidentale Sicula	115.7 km (71.9 mi)	0.0 km (0 mi)	TP	

=== Alcamo-Trapani connection ===
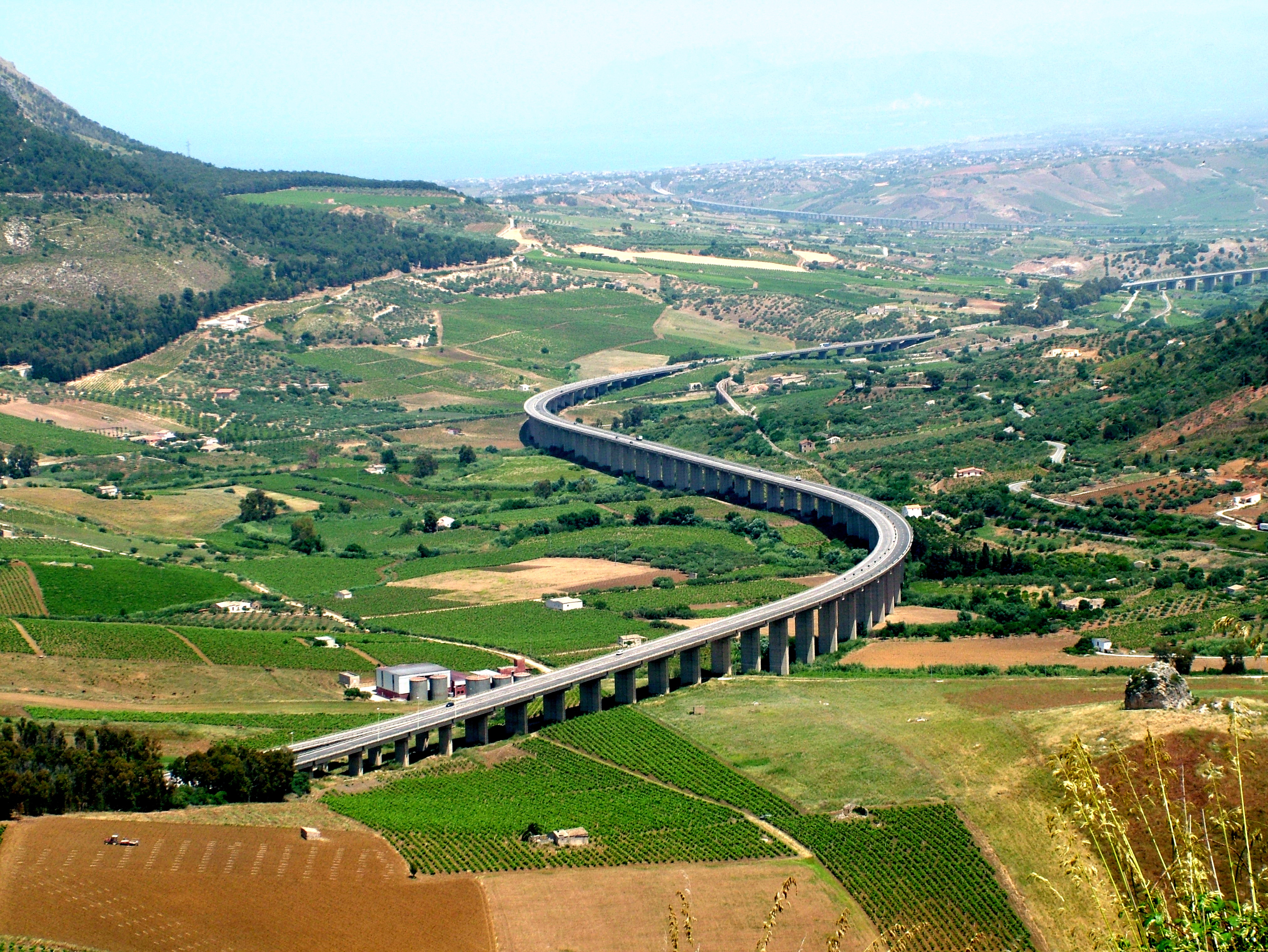
The viaduct Caldo of the Alcamo-Trapani connection near Calatafimi-Segesta.

DIRAMAZIONE ALCAMO-TRAPANI; Alcamo-Trapani connection
Exit	↓km↓	↑km↑	Province	European Route
Palermo - Mazara del Vallo	0.0 km (0 mi)	36.9 km (22.9 mi)	TP	E90
Calatafimi-Segesta; Segesta	8.9 km (5.5 mi)	27.9 km (17.3 mi)	TP	E933
Fulgatore; Settentrionale Sicula	21.3 km (13.2 mi)	15.5 km (9.6 mi)	TP	E933
Dattilo	27.9 km (17.3 mi)	8.9 km (5.5 mi)	TP	E933
Diramazione per Birgi; Trapani–Birgi Airport	28.7 km (17.8 mi)	8.1 km (5.0 mi)	TP	E933
Trapani; Scorrimento Villa Rosina	36.9 km (22.9 mi)	0.0 km (0 mi)	TP	E933

=== Birgi Airport connection ===
DIRAMAZIONE PER BIRGI; Birgi Airport connection
Exit	↓km↓	↑km↑	Province	European Route
Diramazione Alcamo-Trapani	0.0 km (0 mi)	13.1 km (8.1 mi)	TP	-
Marsala	7.0 km (4.3 mi)	6.0 km (3.7 mi)	TP	-
Marausa	11.5 km (7.1 mi)	1.5 km (0.93 mi)	TP	-
Strada provinciale 21 Trapani - Marsala - Mozia; Trapani–Birgi Airport	13.1 km (8.1 mi)	0.0 km (0 mi)	TP	-

=== Palermo Airport connection ===
BRETELLA AEROPORTO "FALCONE E BORSELLINO"; Palermo Airport connection
Exit	↓km↓	↑km↑	Province	European Route
Palermo-Mazara del Vallo	0.0 km (0 mi)	4.1 km (2.5 mi)	PA	E90
Marina di Cinisi	0.6 km (0.37 mi)	3.5 km (2.2 mi)	PA	E933
Palermo International Airport	4.1 km (2.5 mi)	0.0 km (0 mi)	PA	E933

=== A29-Palermo connection ===
RACCORDO A29-PALERMO; Raccordo per via Belgio; A29-Palermo connection
Palermo-Mazara del Vallo	0.0 km (0 mi)	5.6 km (3.5 mi)	PA	E90
Ospedale Cervello (Note: Only exit towards Palermo.)	1.4 km (0.87 mi)	-	PA	E90
Zona industriale nord (Note: Entry only in the direction of Mazara del Vallo and exit only in the direction of Palermo.)	3.1 km (1.9 mi)	2.2 km (1.4 mi)	PA	E90
Viale Regione Siciliana -Palermo	5.6 km (3.5 mi)	0.0 km (0 mi)	PA	E90

== See also ==
- Autostrade of Italy
- Roads in Italy
- Transport in Italy

=== Other Italian roads ===
- State highways (Italy)
- Regional road (Italy)
- Provincial road (Italy)
- Municipal road (Italy)
