= European route E90 =

Road in trans-European E-road network

Coordinates: 37°58′51″N 13°40′09″E

E90

Major junctions
- West end: Lisbon, Portugal
- East end: Silopi, Turkey

Location
- Countries: Portugal; Spain; Italy; Greece; Turkey

Highway system
- International E-road network; A Class; B Class

European route E 90 is an A-Class West–East European route, extending from Lisbon in Portugal in the west to the Turkish–Iraqi border in the east. It is connected to the M5 of the Arab Mashreq International Road Network.

== Itinerary ==
The E 90 routes through five European countries, and includes four sea-crossings: Barcelona, Spain - Mazara del Vallo, Italy; Messina, Italy to Reggio Calabria, Italy; Brindisi, Italy, to Igoumenitsa, Greece, and Eceabat, Turkey, to Çanakkale, Turkey.

=== Portugal ===
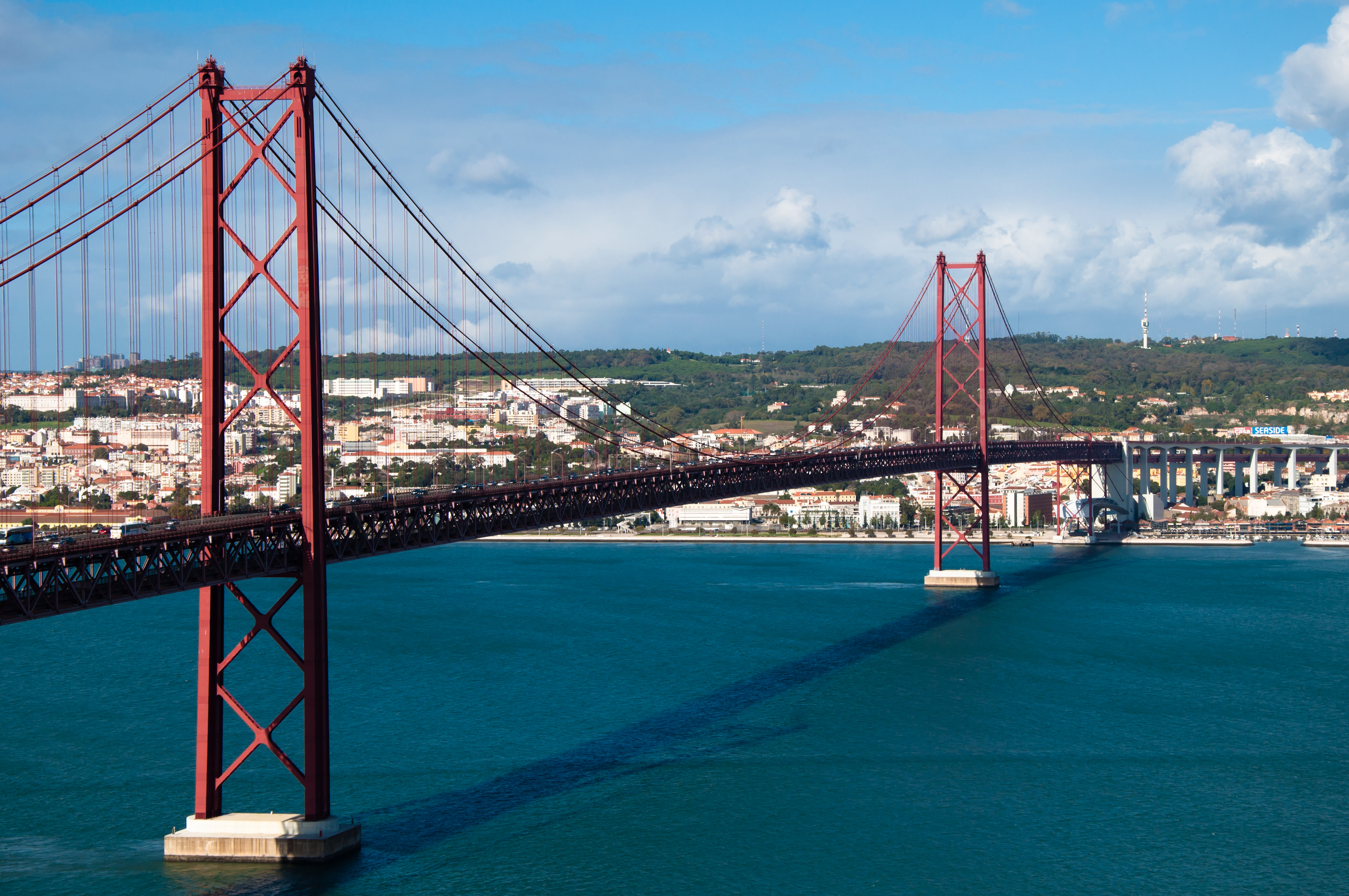
The 25 de Abril Bridge connecting Almada to Lisbon, Portugal

- A 2 / IP 7: Lisbon - Setúbal (Start of concurrency with E01) - Landeira (End of concurrency with E01)
- A 6 / IP 7: Landeira ( E01) - Évora (Start of concurrency with E802) - Estremoz (End of concurrency with E802) - Elvas

=== Spain ===
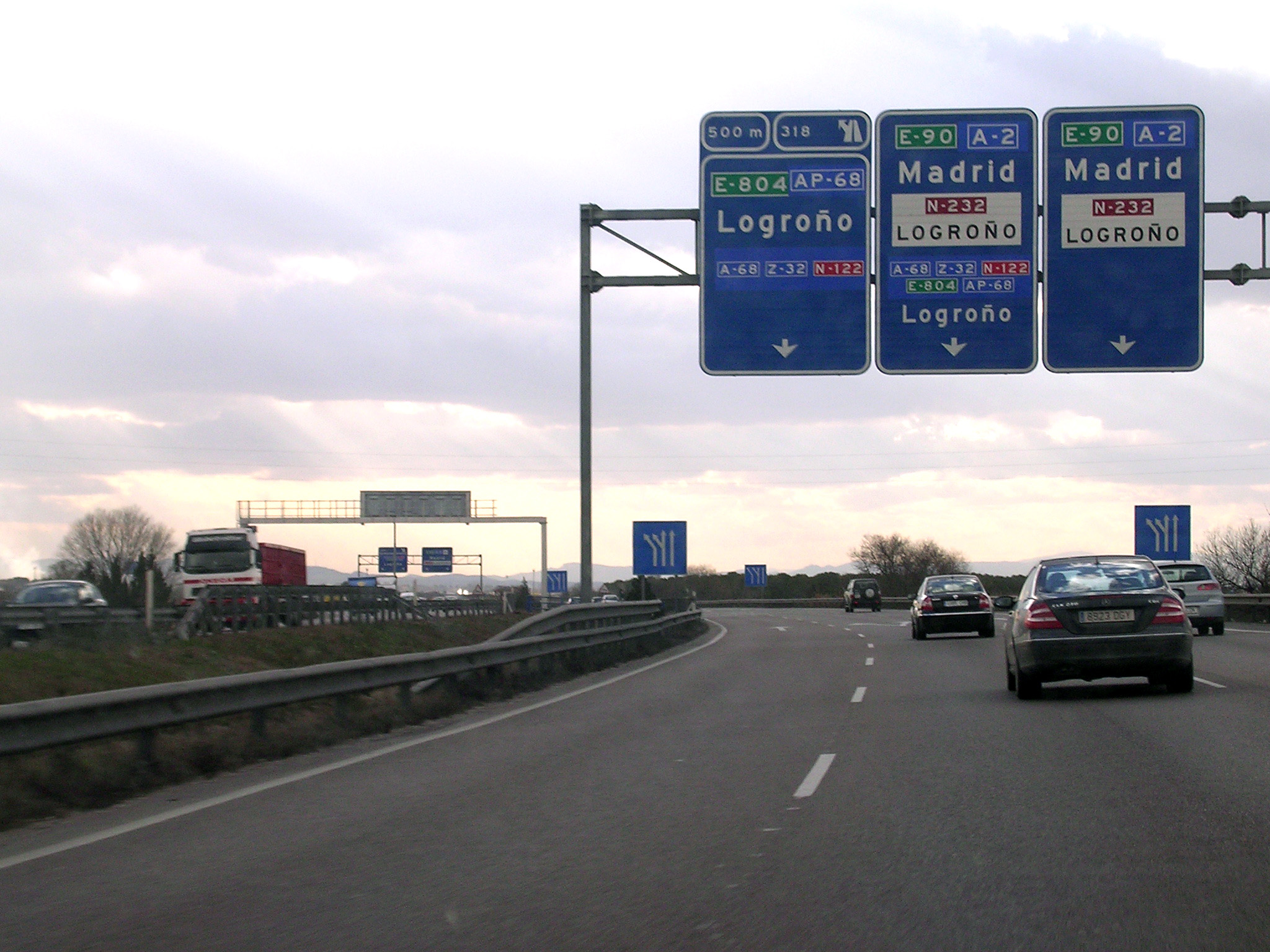
The E90 near Zaragoza, Spain

- A-5: Badajoz - Mérida ( E803) ( E903) - Madrid
- M-30: Madrid ( E5 E901)
- A-2: Zaragoza ( E7 E804)
- AP-2: Zaragoza - Lleida - El Vendrell ( E15)
- AP-7: El Vendrell (Start of concurrency with E15) - Rubí (End of concurrency with E15)
- AP-2: Rubí ( E15) - Barcelona
- B-23: Barcelona
- A-2: Barcelona
- B-10: Barcelona

Gap

- Spain Barcelona - Italy Mazara del Vallo - Presently (2026) there is no direct ferry link from Barcelona (Spain) to Mazara del Vallo (Sicily, Italy).

=== Italy ===
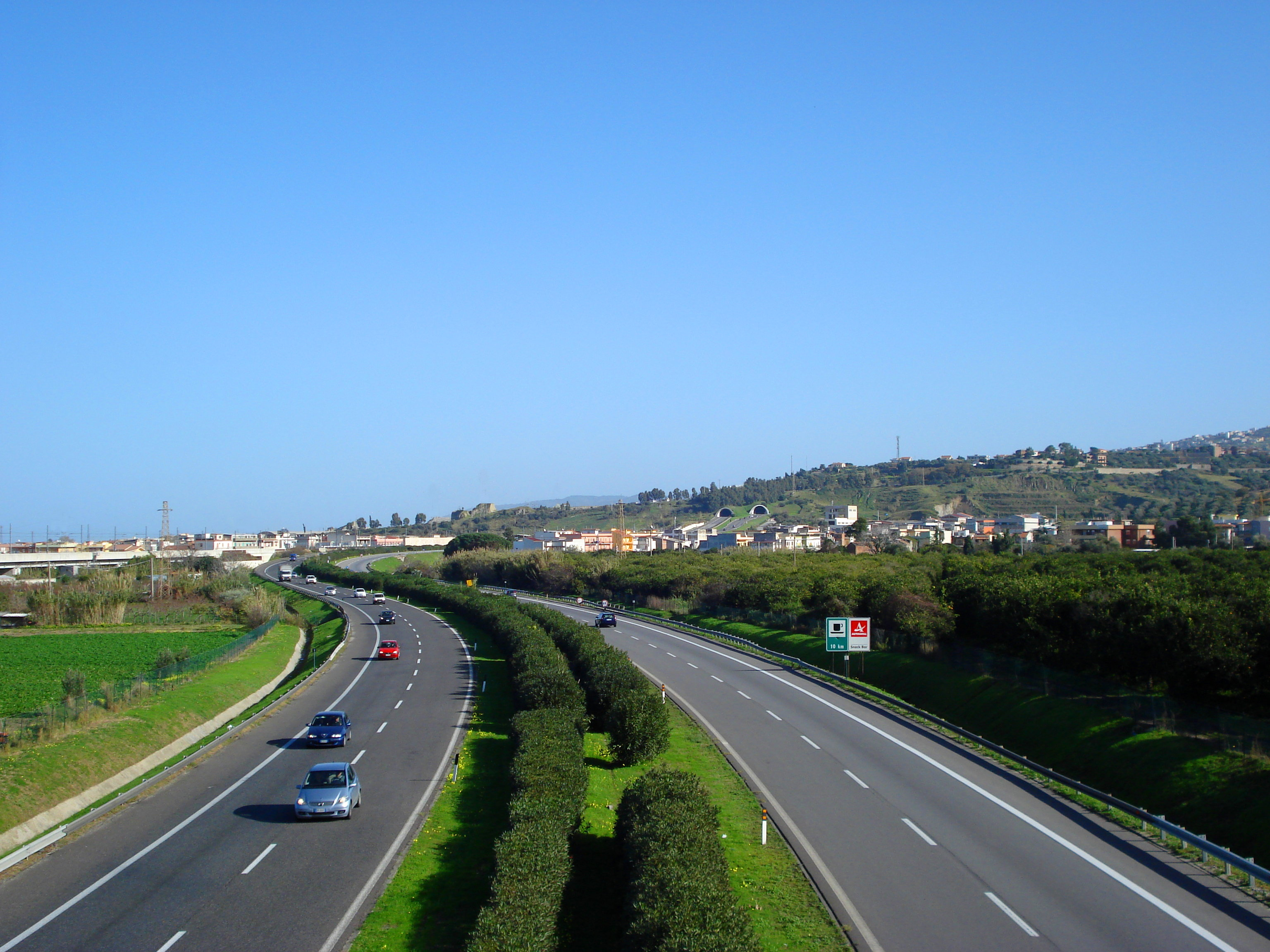
The E90 near Torregrotta, Italy

==== Sicily ====
- A 29: Mazara del Vallo ( E931) - Alcamo ( E933) - Palermo (Towards E25)
- A 20: Palermo (Towards E25) - Campofelice di Roccella
- A 19: Campofelice di Roccella - Messina ( E45)

Ferry

- Officially ferry link is Messina ... Reggio di Calabria. However, presently (2026) no ferry line serves direct automobile traffic between these two ports. There is an alternative and convenient ferry link: Messina - Villa San Giovanni subsequently continuing along the A 2: Villa San Giovanni - Reggio Calabria ( E45).

==== Mainland ====
- SS 106: Reggio Calabria - Catanzaro ( E848) - Crotone ( E846) - Sibari ( E848) - Metaponto ( E847) - Taranto ( E843)
- SS 7: Taranto ( E843) - Brindisi ( E55)
- SS 16 / SS 613: Brindisi ( E55)

Ferry

- Italy Brindisi - Greece Igoumenitsa

=== Greece ===
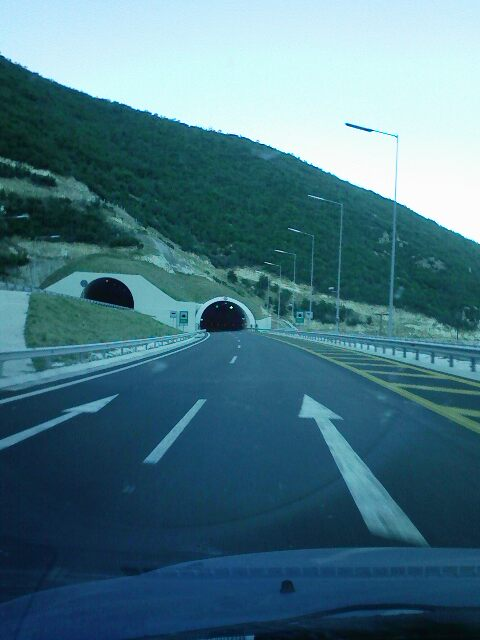
The E90 near Veria, Greece

- A2: Igoumenitsa – Ioannina – Kozani – Veria – Thessaloniki – Kavala – Komotini – Alexandroupolis – Kipoi (border with Turkey)

The E90 in Greece currently runs from Igoumenitsa in the west to Kipoi in the east, via Ioannina, Kozani, Thessaloniki and Alexandroupolis: the eastern end of the E90 in Greece leads to Turkey.

In relation to the national road network, the E90 currently follows the A2 motorway (Egnatia Odos) for the entire duration. The Egnatia Odos was named after Via Egnatia, a Roman-era trail from the Adriatic to the Aegean that was built by Macedonian proconsul Gnaeus Egnatius: the Roman road was later extended to Byzantium (Constantinople) to the east and Rome to the west.

The E90 runs concurrently with the E75 between Kleidi and Kalochori (via Chalastra), the E79 between Lagkadas and Efkarpia, and the E92 between Igoumenitsa and Panagia. The E90 also connects with the E55 at Igoumenitsa, the E65 at Kozani, the E85 north of Ardani, the E853 at Ioannina, and the E951 at Pedini (southwest of Ioannina).

=== Turkey ===
- D.110: İpsala - Keşan ( E84 E87)
- D.550: Keşan ( E84, Start of concurrency with E87) - Gelibolu (End of concurrency with E87)
- : Gelibolu - Lapseki
- D.200: Lapseki - Karacabey (Start of concurrency with E881) - Bursa
- O-5: Bursa (End of concurrency with E881)
- O-22: Bursa
- D.200: Bursa - Eskişehir - Sivrihisar ( E96) - Ankara ( E89)
- O-20: Ankara ( E88 E89)
- D.750: Ankara ( E88) - Aksaray - Ulukışla
- O-21A: Ulukışla
- O-21: Ulukışla - Tarsus ( E982)
- O-51: Tarsus ( E982) - Adana
- O-52: Adana - Toprakkale ( E91) - Gaziantep - Şanlıurfa ( E99)
- D.400: Şanlıurfa - Nusaybin ( (Syria) Qamishli) - Cizre
- D.430: Cizre - Silopi
