= Plus-Minus (Stockhausen) =

Composition by Karlheinz Stockhausen

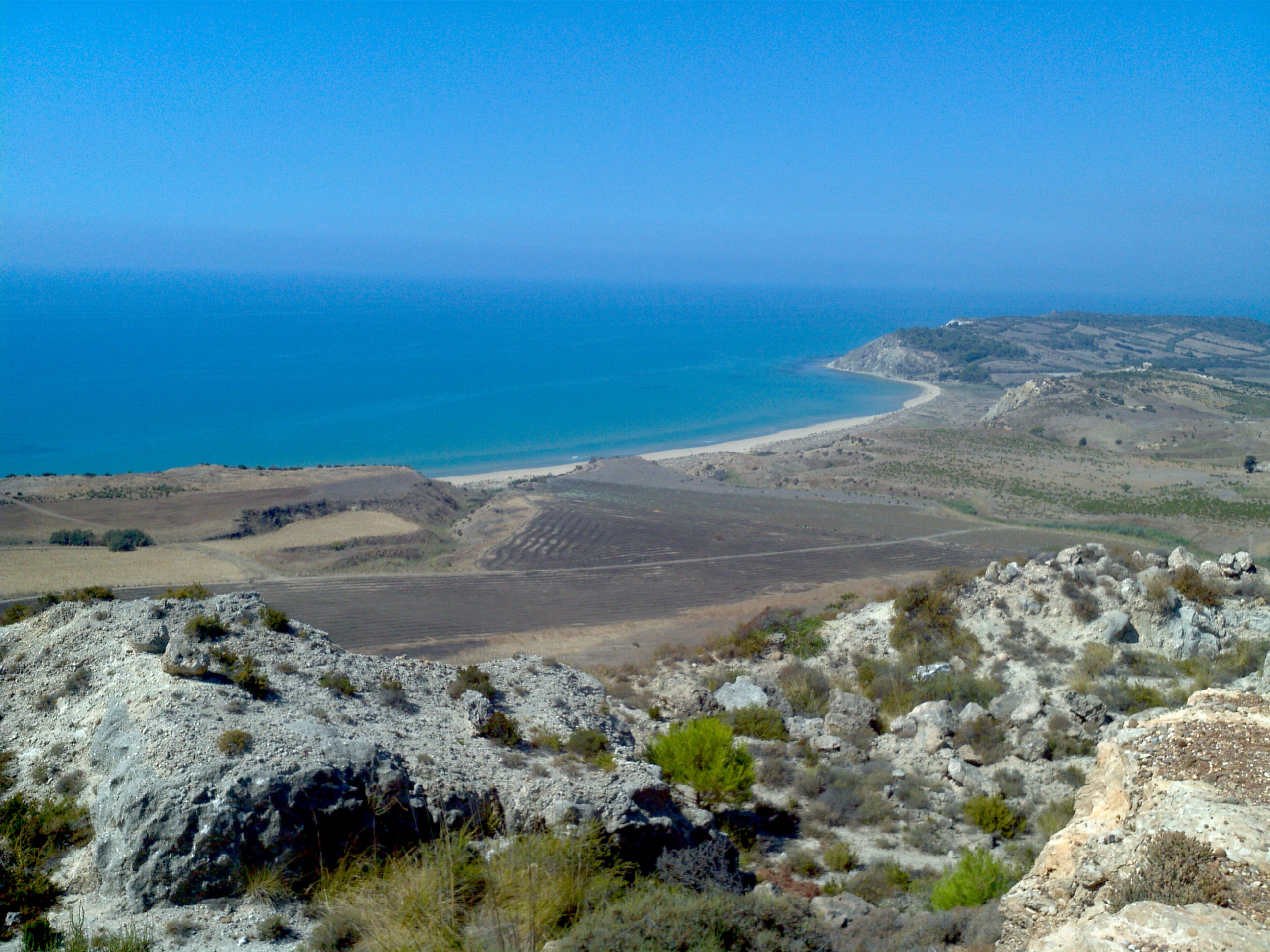
Stockhausen sketched Plus-Minus in the sand of a beach at Siculiana, Sicily

Plus-Minus, 2 × 7 pages for realisation, is a composition for one or several performers by Karlheinz Stockhausen, first written in 1963 and redrafted in 1974. It is Nr. 14 in the composer's catalogue of works, and has a variable performing length that depends on the version worked out from the given materials. The score is dedicated to Mary Bauermeister.

== History ==
Plus-Minus is a "polyvalent process composition", designed as a project for the composition students attending the first Cologne Courses for New Music, held at the Rheinische Musikhochschule in October to December 1963. In it, various compositional premises of Stockhausen's are presented in such a way as to enable the most radically different concrete results.

Plus-Minus was composed in September 1963 while Stockhausen was in Siculiana, preparing for what proved to be an aborted performance of Momente at the Palermo Festival:

In 1963 I spent a couple of weeks in Sicily by the seashore, and as I couldn't take a lot of paper with me I tried to hide in the shadow of a rock and think clearly about a new piece, and Plus-Minus is what emerged. (I'd discussed all the possible transformations of the seven 'musical types' that occur in the score with Mary [Bauermeister], and we drew them in the sand together.

The piece represents an extreme instance of the new, open type of composition Stockhausen was developing at the time, and evolved from a number of conversations with Mary Bauermeister in Siculiana and Palermo. Stockhausen's intention was to enable a music that reproduces itself, within a strict framework. Twenty-five different versions were made by the students in 1963, for a wide variety of forces: one for four harps, one for three harps and two pianos, one for recorders and children's choir, one for large orchestra, one for percussion and piano, one for two percussionists, and another for choir and chamber orchestra.

The first public performance was given in Rome in June 1964 by Cornelius Cardew and Frederic Rzewski, each of whom realised one page of the score. When Stockhausen heard a tape of this performance, he was astonished that sounds he had usually avoided were being employed, exactly according to the score's specifications, to achieve a highly poetic quality.

== Analysis ==
The course of the work is based on polarities of attraction and repulsion, of growth and decay. Material is systematically accumulated and eroded, in a process resembling a game of chess, where central and secondary notes either expand and proliferate, or are reduced until they disappear. These oppositions include, for example, the confrontation of materials having definite pitch with others of indeterminate pitch. The score systematically catalogues its materials into:

1. Seven types of events
2. Seven different ways of placing ornaments relative to a central sound (1) before, (2) simultaneous, (3) after, (4) before and after, (5) simultaneous and after, (6) before and simultaneous, (7) all three
3. Seven different formal units of the piece
4. Seven different basic types of grouping notes
5. Seven possible formal constellations for one complete realisation of seven formal units
6. Seven possible temporal combinations of adjacent events
7. Three types of rests separating events (long, medium, short)
8. Three types of superimposition
9. Seven possible overall characteristics of a given layer, (1) pitched sound, (2) noise (3–6) mixed pitch and noise (each one hard or soft), or (7) free

There are seven so-called "symbol pages", on which all musical events are represented by ideograms, and a second set of "note pages" on which the pitch material for the events is notated. One or several layers of events can be worked out from these fourteen pages, and be combined according to particular rules. The note material is all derived from the prime and inverted forms of the following twelve-tone row:

C♯ D G♯ A♯ A G E B D♯ F♯ C F

The types wax or wane according to the prescribed plus and minus processes, up to a maximum value of +13, which can result in very long sounds. If a process of diminution continues after reaching a value of 0, the events become represented by a "negative band of sound"—a "sound wall" of noise, such as breathing or radio noise, out of which silent events are cut until a value of −13 is reached, which is total silence. At that point, the event-type in question "dies" and may not be used again in the piece.

== Reception ==
The score of Plus-Minus is complicated, delivering the message that composing serial music is hard work. The openness of the score was itself seen at the end of the 20th century as a form of control, deterring all but the most committed musicians from undertaking performances. Nevertheless, anyone making a realisation does have considerable control over the nature of the piece, and "negative-minded realisers can kill the piece, the over-positive can encourage disproportionate growth". At the first Cologne Courses, a student composer from Iceland, Atli Heimir Sveinsson, "assassinated" Plus-Minus by deliberately discovering the quickest way to end the piece. According to Stockhausen, "There were just a few blips and blobs and then lots of silences … that was it".

== Discography ==
- Karlheinz Stockhausen: Piano Music. Elisabeth Klein (piano); Stockhausen: Tierkreis, Klavierstücke V, IX, and XI (two versions), Litanei from Aus den sieben Tagen (collage version of fragments from piano compositions by Stockhausen put together by Elisabeth Klein), A One-Page Version of Karlheinz Stockhausen's Plus-Minus (1963) for Solo Piano (1998), by Nils Holger Petersen. Recorded in the Levin Salen at the Norwegian State Academy of Music on August 14–15, 1998. CD recording. Classico CLASSCD 269. Frederiksberg, Denmark: Olufsen Records, 1999. Reissued in the Scandinavian Classics series as TIM 220555–205. Hamburg, Germany: TIM The International Music Company AG, 2002.
- Charlotte Moorman, Cello Anthology. Charlotte Moorman (cello), Nam June Paik (piano and Robot K-456), Terry Jennings (soprano saxophone), Benjamin Patterson, Philip Corner, Malcolm Goldstein, Jackson Mac Low, David Behrman. Sylvano Bussotti: Sensitivo no. 7; John Cage: 26'1.1499" for a String Player (two versions); Earle Brown: November 1952, December 1952, and Synergy; Terry Jennings: Piece for Cello and Saxophone; Giuseppe Chiari: Per arco, Ave Maria di Schubert; Jackson Mac Low: Long Hot Summer; Nam June Paik: Cello Sonata, opus 69; Sonata no. 1 for Adults Only, TV Cello Duets; Concerto for TV Cello and Videotapes, Waiting for Commercials; Karlheinz Stockhausen: Plus-Minus (realisation by Nam June Paik with Robot K-456, aka Robot Opera); Toshi Ichiyanagi: Duet II. Charlotte Moorman interview by Harvey Matusow, BBC New York Studios, October 1969. Recorded between 1964 and 1982 in various locations (Plus-Minus recorded in Judson Hall, New York City, Fall 1964). Compact disc 4 sound discs (digital, stereo, 4¾ in.) Alga Marghen 27NMN.064. Italy: Alga Marghen, 2006. Disc with Plus-Minus also issued separately, as Charlotte Moorman, Cello Anthology: Vol. 1. Alga Marghen plana-M 27NMN.064.1. Italy: Alga Marghen, 2006.
- Karlheinz Stockhausen: Plus-Minus. Ives Ensemble. Stockhausen: Refrain, Kreuzspiel, Plus-Minus (realisation by Christopher Fox and John Snijders). Recorded 29 June – 2 July 2002 at Theater Romein, Leeuwarden, Netherlands. CD recording. Hat Hut hat[now]ART 178. Basel, Switzerland: Hat Hut, 2010.
- Ming Tsao: Plus Minus & Mirandas Atemwende. ensemble ascolta. Plus-Minus (realisation by Ming Tsao). Ensemble ascolta; Johannes Kalitzke (cond.). Recorded 18–19 July 2014, KvB-Saal Funkhaus Köln, Germany. CD recording, 1 disc: digital, stereo, 4¾ in. Vienna, Austria: Kairos, 2017.
