= Raccordo autostradale RA16 =

Road in Italy

Raccordo autostradale 16
- Motorway connection 16
- Raccordo autostradale Cimpello-Pian di Pan; Cimpello-Pian di Pan motorway connection

Route information
- Maintained by Friuli Venezia Giulia Strade
- Length: 2.9 km (1.8 mi)
- Existed: 1974–present

Major junctions
- West end: Cimpello
- A28 in Cimpello
- East end: Fiume Veneto

Location
- Country: Italy
- Regions: Friuli-Venezia Giulia

Highway system
- Roads in Italy; Autostrade; State; Regional; Provincial; Municipal
← RA 15

Raccordo autostradale 16 (RA 16; "Motorway connection 16") or Raccordo autostradale Cimpello-Pian di Pan ("Cimpello-Pian di Pan motorway connection") is an Italian state highway 2.9 kilometres (1.8 mi) long located in the region of Friuli-Venezia Giulia that connects the Cimpello exit of Autostrada A28 with Strada statale 13 Pontebbana in Pian di Pan in Fiume Veneto. In some maps, it is reported as via Pontebbana. It is managed by Friuli Venezia Giulia Strade.

== Route ==
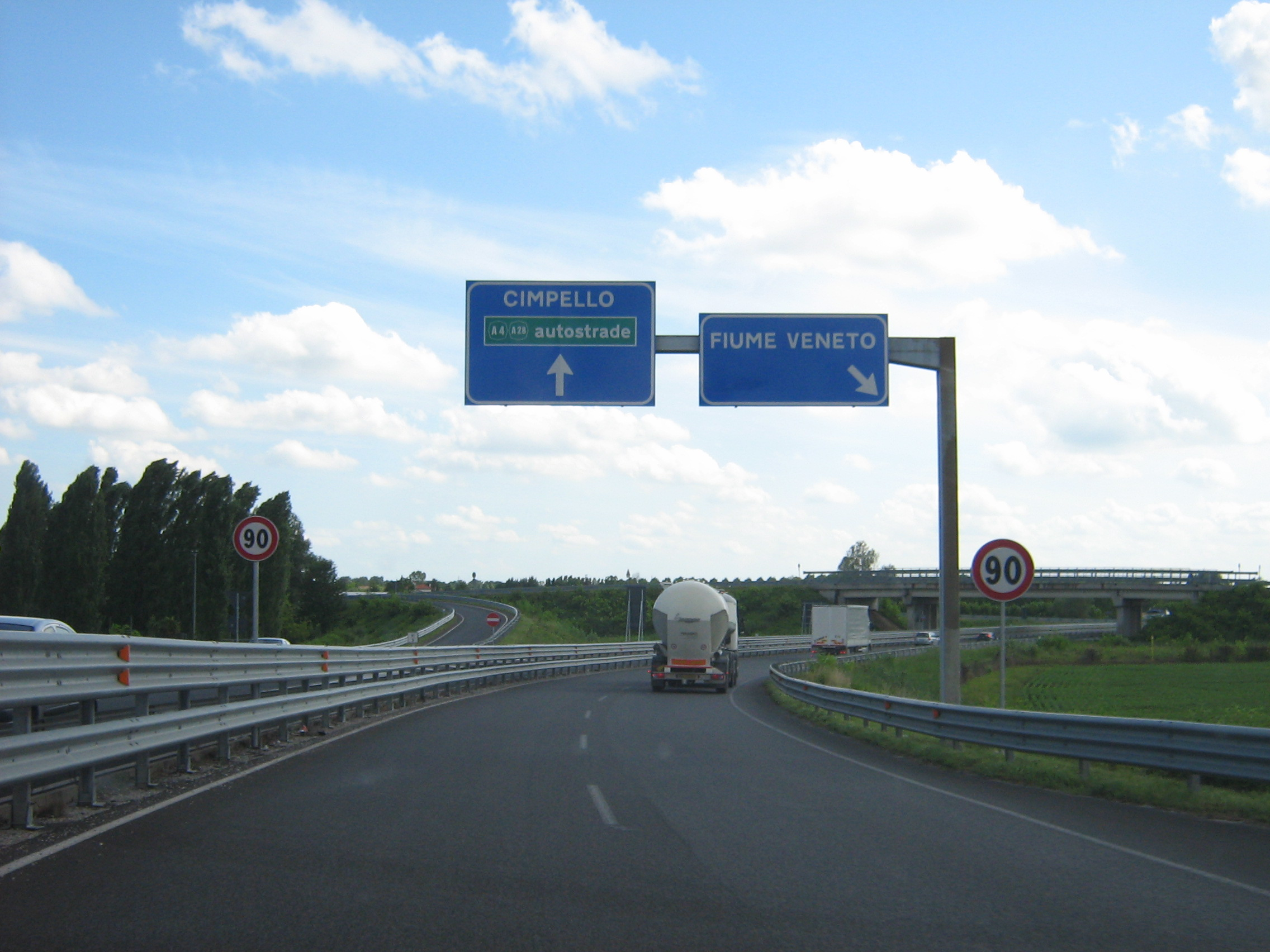
Raccordo autostradale RA16 near Fiume Veneto

RACCORDO AUTOSTRADALE 16; Raccordo autostradale Cimpello-Pian di Pan
Exit	↓km↓	↑km↑	Province	European Route
Portogruaro-Pordenone	0.0 km (0 mi)	2.9 km (1.8 mi)	PN	--
Cimpello	0.3 km (0.19 mi)	2.6 km (1.6 mi)	PN	--
Rest area	0.7 km (0.43 mi)	2.2 km (1.4 mi)	PN	--
Fiume Veneto	2.7 km (1.7 mi)	0.2 km (0.12 mi)	PN	--
Pontebbana	2.9 km (1.8 mi)	0.0 km (0 mi)	PN	--

== See also ==
- Roads in Italy
- State highways (Italy)
- Transport in Italy

=== Other Italian roads ===
- Autostrade of Italy
- Regional road (Italy)
- Provincial road (Italy)
- Municipal road (Italy)
