= European route E848 =

Road in trans-European E-road network

E848

Route information
- Length: 38 km (24 mi)

Major junctions
- From: Lamezia Terme
- To: Catanzaro

Location
- Countries: Italy

Highway system
- International E-road network; A Class; B Class

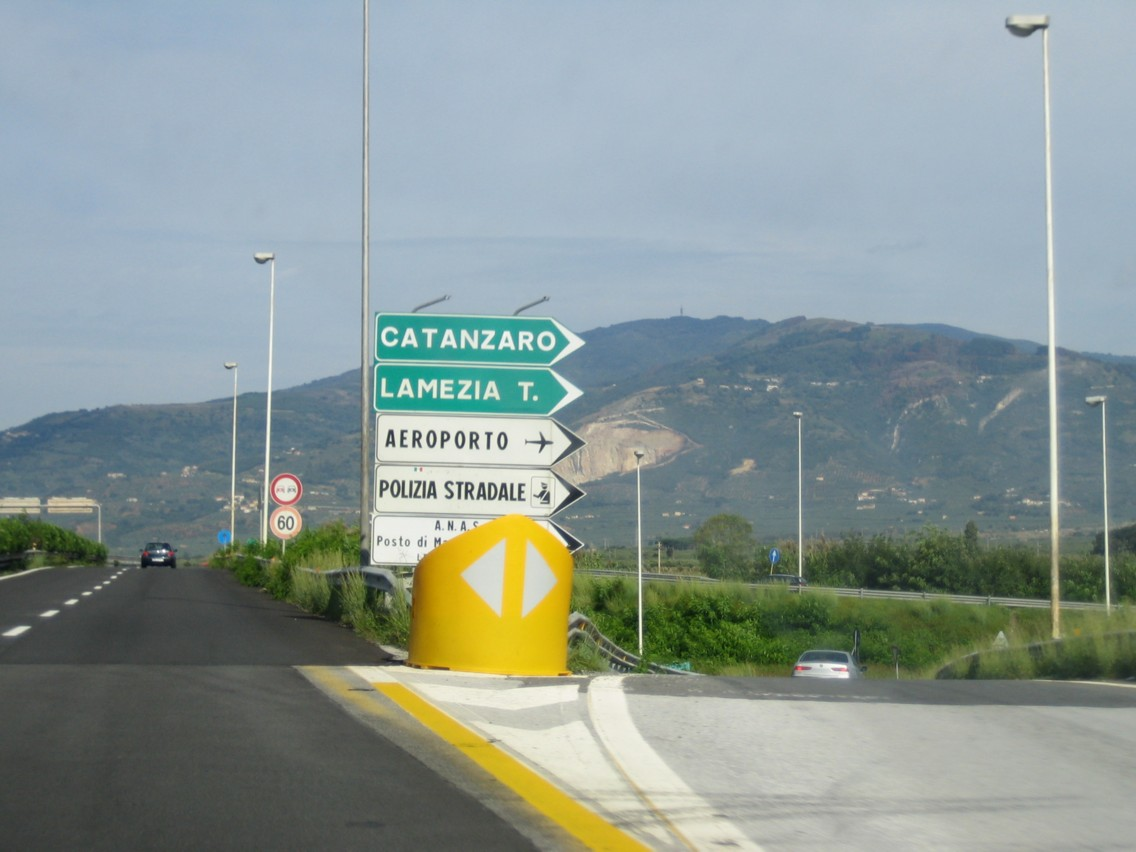
European route 848 near Lamezia Terme.

European route E 848 is a European B class road in Italy, connecting the cities Lamezia Terme – Catanzaro.

== Route ==
- Italy
  - Lamezia Terme
  - E90 Catanzaro
