= European route E846 =

Road in trans-European E-road network

E846

Route information
- Length: 112 km (70 mi)

Major junctions
- From: Cosenza
- To: Crotone

Location
- Countries: Italy

Highway system
- International E-road network; A Class; B Class

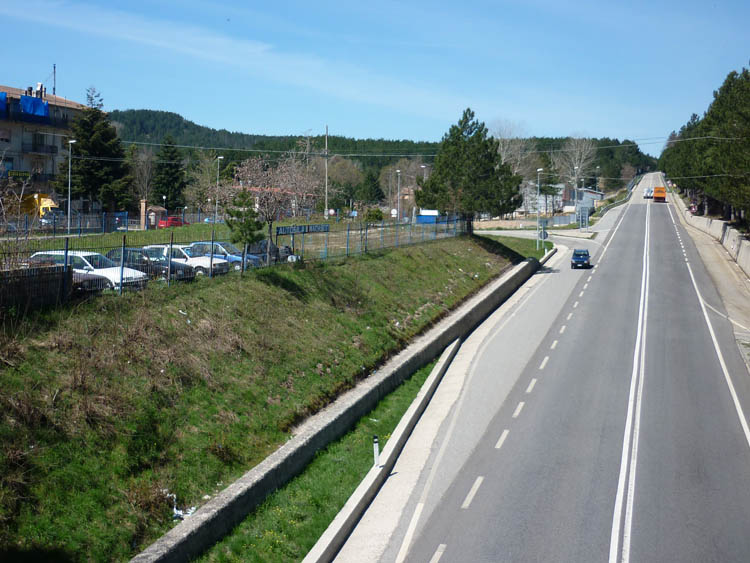
European route 846 near San Giovanni in Fiore.

European route E 846 is a European B class road in Italy, connecting the cities Cosenza – Crotone.

== Route ==
- Italy
  - E45 Cosenza
  - E90 Crotone
