= Autopista AP-2 =

Road in Spain

Autopista AP-2
- Autopista del Nordeste
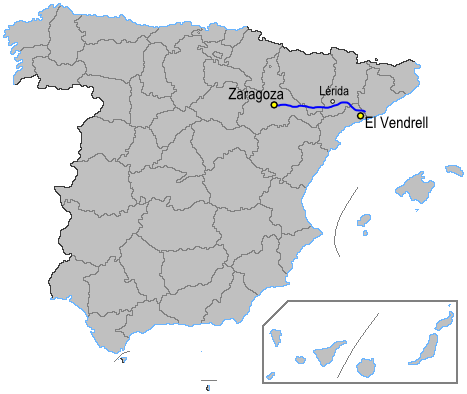

Route information
- Part of
- Length: 215 km (134 mi)

Major junctions
- From: Zaragoza
- To: El Vendrell

Location
- Country: Spain

Highway system
- Highways in Spain; Autopistas and autovías; National Roads

The Autopista AP-2 also known as the Autopista del Nordeste (North-East motorway), is a highway (autopista) in the north of Spain that connects the northern coast with the eastern coast of the country. It starts at the city of Zaragoza, passes Lleida and ends at El Vendrell, 70 kilometers west of Barcelona, where it connects with AP-7. It was a toll road, and forms part of the European route E90.

== Route ==
It is a major motorway in Spain because it is between Barcelona and Madrid. The free state-owned A-2 autovía is available between Madrid and Zaragoza, and between Lleida and Barcelona, but from Zaragoza to Lleida the traffic needs to either transfer to AP-2 or continue to Zaragoza through the standard highway N-II.

It was finished at 1977 and was exploited under a concession agreement operated by Abertis. This concession agreement expired in 2021 and the motorway ownership was transferred to the state, with all tolls throughout the route abolished.

#	From	To	Length	Signal
1	Zaragoza	Fraga	121.49 km	AP-2
2	Fraga	Lleida	29.05 km	AP-2
3	Lleida	El Vendrell	107.17 km	AP-2
