= Autostrada A27 (Italy) =

Controlled-access highway in Italy

Autostrada A27
- Autostrada d'Alemagna; Alemagna motorway

Route information
- Maintained by ANAS
- Length: 82.5 km (51.3 mi)
- Existed: 1972–present

Major junctions
- South end: Venice
- A57 in Venice; A4 in Casale sul Sile; SPV in Treviso
- North end: Pian di Vedoia

Location
- Country: Italy
- Regions: Veneto

Highway system
- Roads in Italy; Autostrade; State; Regional; Provincial; Municipal
← A 26	→ A 28

The Autostrada A27 or Autostrada d'Alemagna ("Alemagna motorway") is an autostrada (Italian for "motorway") 82.5 kilometres (51.3 mi) long in Italy located in the region of Veneto which connects Venice to Pian di Vedoia, a frazione of Ponte nelle Alpi, where it joins the strada statale 51 di Alemagna.

== Route ==
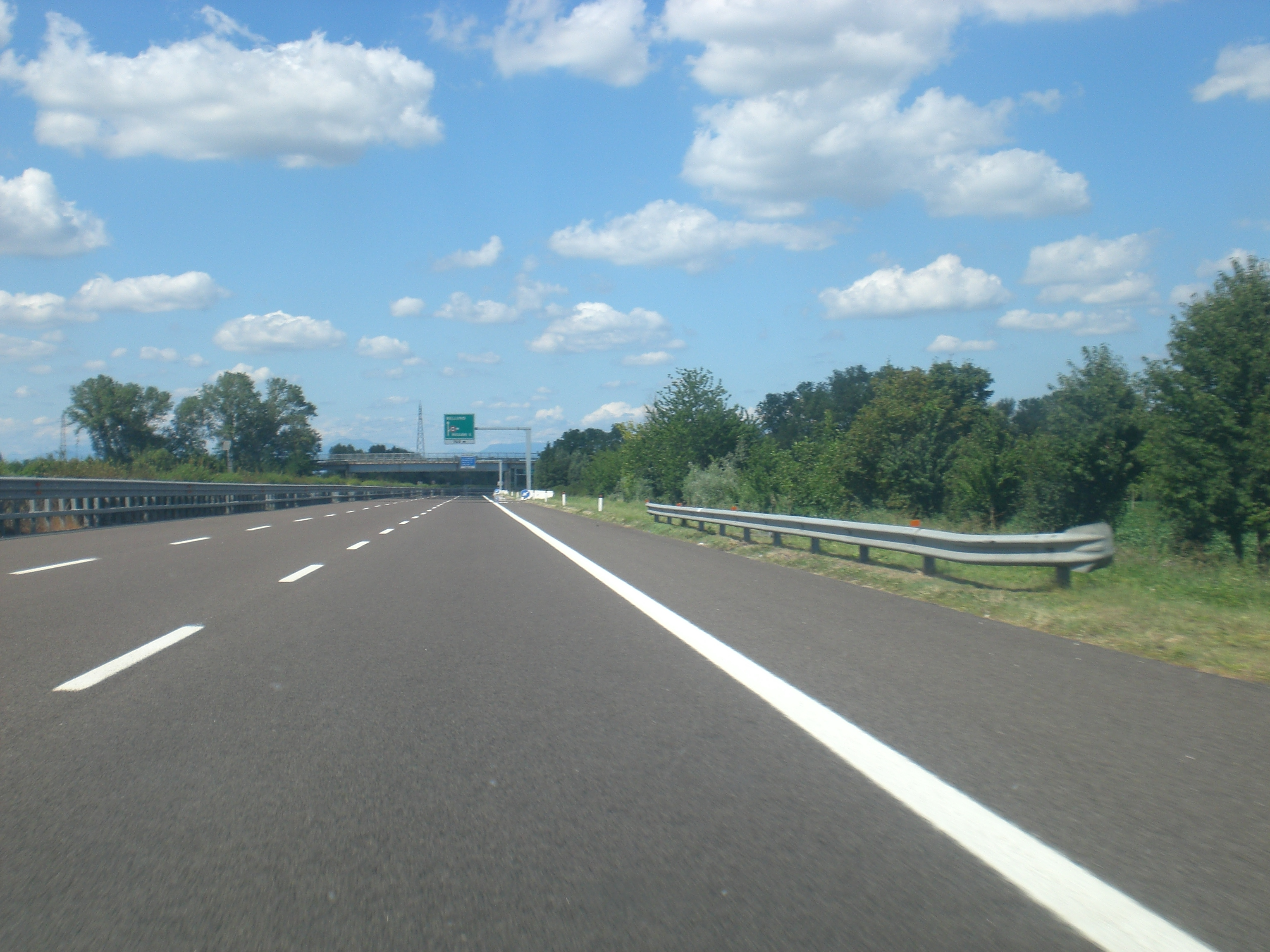
Autostrada A27 near Mogliano Veneto

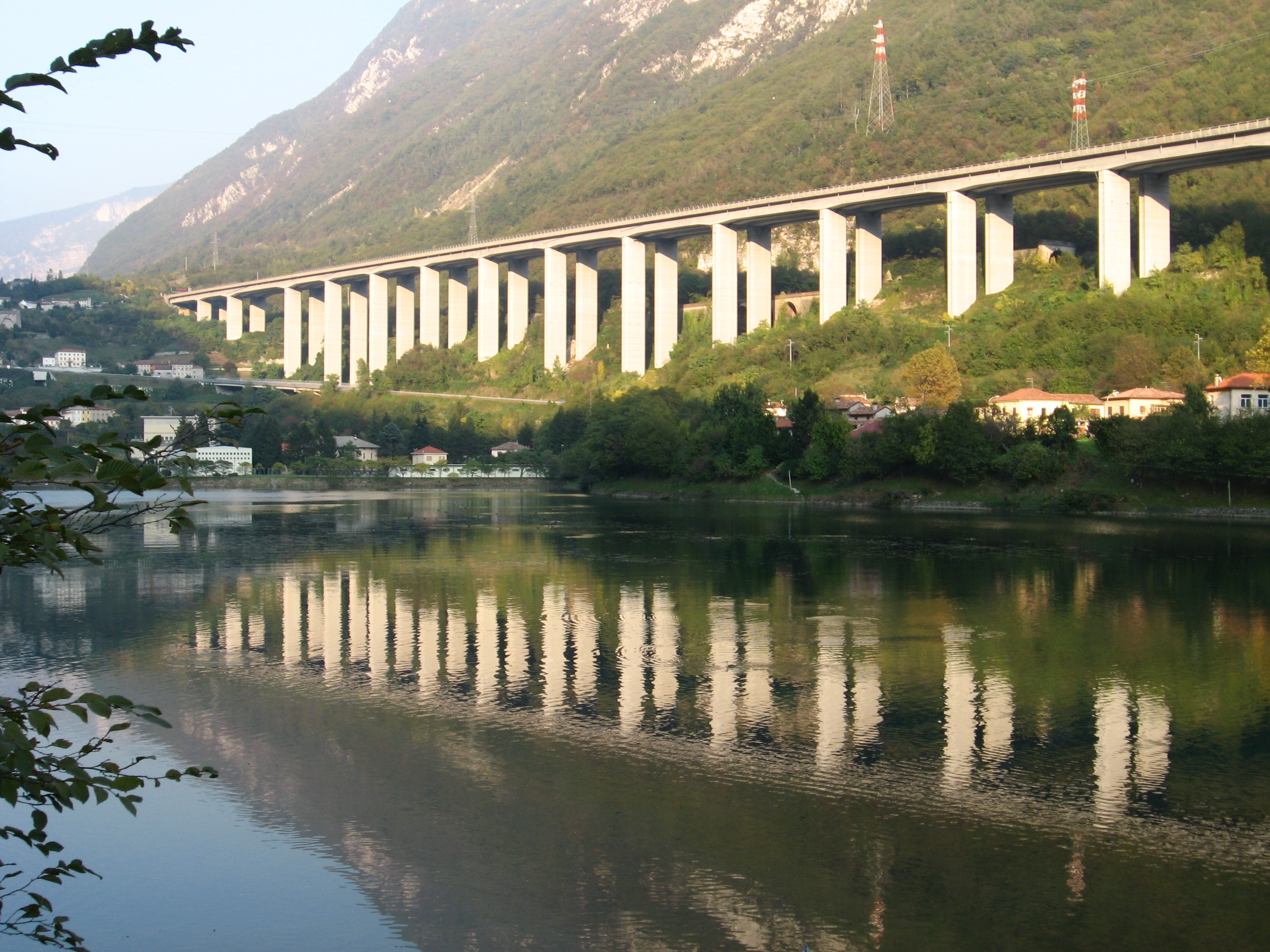
Autostrada A27 near Vittorio Veneto

VENEZIA - BELLUNO; Autostrada d'Alemagna
Exit	↓km↓	↑km↑	Province	European Route
Tangenziale di Mestre; Venice Marco Polo Airport	0.0 km (0 mi)	82.5 km (51.3 mi)	VE	--
Mogliano Veneto	4.0 km (2.5 mi)	78.5 km (48.8 mi)	TV	--
Casale sul Sile (Note: Exit only for the roadway towards Belluno, entry for both routes.)	4.8 km (3.0 mi)	77.3 km (48.0 mi)	TV	--
Toll gate Venezia Nord	5.0 km (3.1 mi)	77.5 km (48.2 mi)	TV	--
Milano – Trieste	6.4 km (4.0 mi)	76.0 km (47.2 mi)	TV	--
Rest area "Sile"	8.0 km (5.0 mi)	74.5 km (46.3 mi)	TV	--
Treviso Sud; Postumia; Treviso Airport	13.4 km (8.3 mi)	70.6 km (43.9 mi)	TV	--
Treviso Nord	22.6 km (14.0 mi)	61.4 km (38.2 mi)	TV	--
Pedemontana Veneta	26.0 km (16.2 mi)	58.0 km (36.0 mi)	TV	--
Conegliano; Portogruaro - Pordenone - Conegliano	41.2 km (25.6 mi)	42.8 km (26.6 mi)	TV	--
Rest area "Cervada" (Note: Only towards Belluno.)	50.0 km (31.1 mi)	34.0 km (21.1 mi)	TV	--
Vittorio Veneto Sud	55.3 km (34.4 mi)	31.7 km (19.7 mi)	TV	--
Vittorio Veneto Nord	60.0 km (37.3 mi)	25.1 km (15.6 mi)	TV	--
Fadalto; Lago di Santa Croce (Note: Accessible only when exiting in the direction of Belluno and entering in the direction of Venice.)	66.9 km (41.6 mi)	17.1 km (10.6 mi)	TV	--
Toll gate Belluno	75.2 km (46.7 mi)	8.8 km (5.5 mi)	BL	--
Belluno	77.2 km (48.0 mi)	6.8 km (4.2 mi)	BL	--
Rest area "Ponte nelle Alpi" (Note: Only towards Venice.)	82.0 km (51.0 mi)	2.0 km (1.2 mi)	BL	--
Pian di Vedoia; Cadore; Dolomiti di Alemagna Cortina d'Ampezzo	82.5 km (51.3 mi)	0.0 km (0 mi)	BL	--

== See also ==
- Autostrade of Italy
- Roads in Italy
- Transport in Italy

=== Other Italian roads ===
- State highways (Italy)
- Regional road (Italy)
- Provincial road (Italy)
- Municipal road (Italy)
