= Federico Barbaro =

Italian missionary in Japan

- Born: 18 February 1913
- Died: 29 February 1996 (aged 83)
- Occupation: Missionary in Japan

Federico Barbaro, S.D.B. (18 February 1913 – 29 February 1996) was an Italian missionary in Japan, of the congregation of the Salesians of Don Bosco, also active as a teacher, translator and essayist.

Barbaro was born on 18 February 1913 in the Cimpello sector of the town of Fiume Veneto, at that time part of the province of Udine. After taking his first religious vows in 1931 and doing philosophical studies at the Pontifical Gregorian University in Rome, he left for Japan in 1935. He finished his theological studies there and in 1941 was ordained as a priest in Tokyo. Afterwards he served as a teacher of philosophy and theology at the Salesian Institute of Misaki and Tokyo as well as various private and public Japanese lecture courses. From 1950 to 1956 he directed the Salesian publisher Don Bosco Sha in Tokyo. There he produced the journal Katorikku Seikatsu (Catholic Life).

Barbaro's bibliography includes over 120 publications and 2000 articles. His name is especially associated with a complete translation of the Bible into modern Japanese.

Barbaro retired to his native country and was stationed at the Don Bosco Center in the city of Pordenone, where he died on 29 February 1996.
