= Montallegro =

- Comune
- Comune di Montallegro
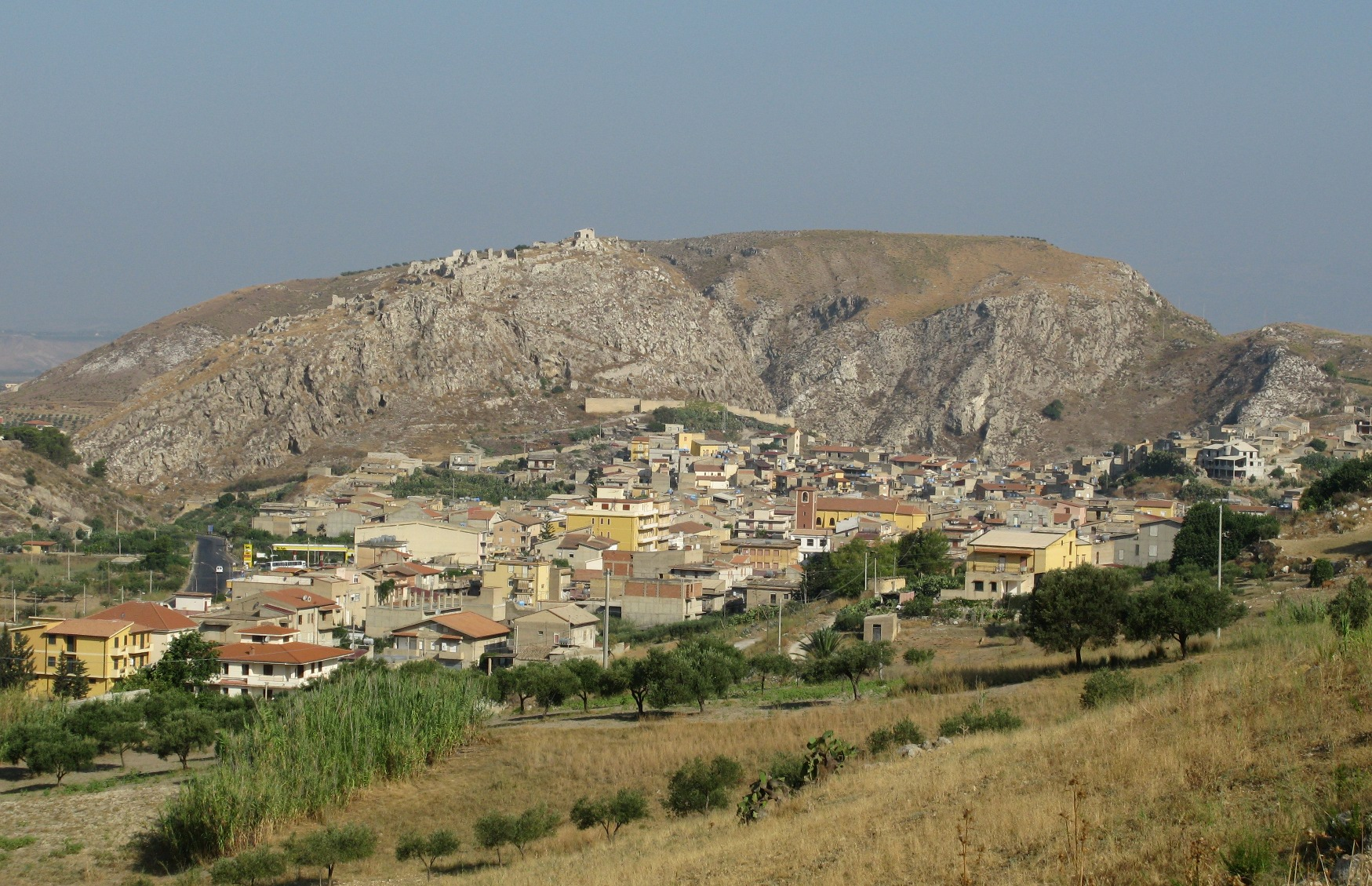
- View of Montallegro

- Coat of arms

- Location within Italy Location within Sicily
- Coordinates: 37°24′N 13°21′E
- Country: Italy
- Region: Sicily
- Province: Agrigento (AG)

Government
  - Mayor: Caterina Scalia

Area
  - Total: 27.41 km^{2} (10.58 sq mi)
- Elevation: 100 m (330 ft)

Population (30 October 2017)
  - Total: 2,498
  - Density: 91.13/km^{2} (236.0/sq mi)
- Demonym: Montallegresi
- Time zone: UTC+1 (CET)
  - Summer (DST): UTC+2 (CEST)
- Postal code: 92010
- Dialing code: 0922

Montallegro (Sicilian: Muntallegru) is a comune (municipality) in the Province of Agrigento in the Italian region Sicily, located about 128 kilometres (80 mi) south of Palermo and about 31 kilometres (19 mi) northwest of Agrigento.

Montallegro borders the following municipalities: Agrigento, Cattolica Eraclea, Siculiana.
