= Tangenziale di Mestre =

Controlled-access highway in Italy

Autostrada A57
- Tangenziale di Mestre; Mestre ring road

Route information
- Part of E55
- Maintained by ANAS
- Length: 26.7 km (16.6 mi)
- Existed: 1972–present

Major junctions
- Beltway around Mestre
- West end: Dolo
- A4 in Dolo; A27 in Marcon; A4 in Quarto d'Altino
- East end: Quarto d'Altino

Location
- Country: Italy
- Regions: Veneto

Highway system
- Roads in Italy; Autostrade; State; Regional; Provincial; Municipal
← A 56	→ A 58

Map of Autostrada A57

The Tangenziale di Mestre ("Mestre ring road") or Autostrada A57 is an autostrada (Italian for "motorway") 26.7 kilometres (16.6 mi) long in Italy located in the region of Veneto bypassing the urban center and suburban developments of Mestre. It was opened to traffic on 3 September 1972 and it is a part of the E55 European route.

== Overview ==
The original design was to have a central dual carriageway as Autostrada A4 (motorway A4), and alongside a separated single carriageway to serve as a local beltway (similar to what was built around Bologna) but it had high costs for a motorway that was not expected to carry much through traffic. East of Venice, it could go only to Udine and Trieste, the latter was at that time the border with the Iron Curtain. The opposition of conservationist groups to a double dual carriageway running inside a city caused the plan to reduce to a single dual carriageway section instead, serving both as Autostrada A4 and local beltway.

== Increased traffic ==
By the 1990s, it became evident that a road designed to cope with a 55,000-vehicle daily traffic level would not be able for traffic levels of up to 150,000–170,000 vehicles (of which 30% were HGVs) by the early 2000s.

A first but temporary solution was to open a "third dynamic lane" on each carriageway: in the most trafficked hours, the emergency lane was suppressed, to be used as a lane for lorries and slow vehicles.

== Passante di Mestre ==
A second definitive solution was to build the Passante di Mestre: opened on 8 February 2009, after about 4 years and a half of construction. It completely bypasses the Tangenziale di Mestre, finally separating Autostrada A4 from the local beltway.

Today, the "third dynamic lane" is still used, but daily traffic has greatly decreased. Speed limit is 90 km/h (56 mph) on faster lanes, 60 km/h (37 mph) on slower ones; a small part, near the interchange with Autostrada A27, has a 50 km/h (31 mph) to 60 km/h (37 mph) speed limit.

The old Tangenziale di Mestre has now to be called, more properly, Tangenziale di Venezia (with new highway identification code: A57): indeed, it is longer than the old Mestre one, because the Passante di Mestre bypasses all the area around Venice, beginning west just after Padua, going north almost to Treviso, and ending east near Quarto d'Altino. So that the old exits of Dolo and Mira, before part of Autostrada A4, are today part of the Tangenziale. Unfortunately, the signage has not been adapted to take account of this development confusing the poor motorist without local knowledge. For example, travelling east, a sign directs the motorist onto the Autostrada A57 and that's the last time you will see any reference to Autostrada A57. The signage quickly reverts to the out-of-date A4 or uses the European route signage.

The beltway is managed by Società delle Autostrade di Venezia e Padova and Autovie Venete S.p.A.

== Route ==
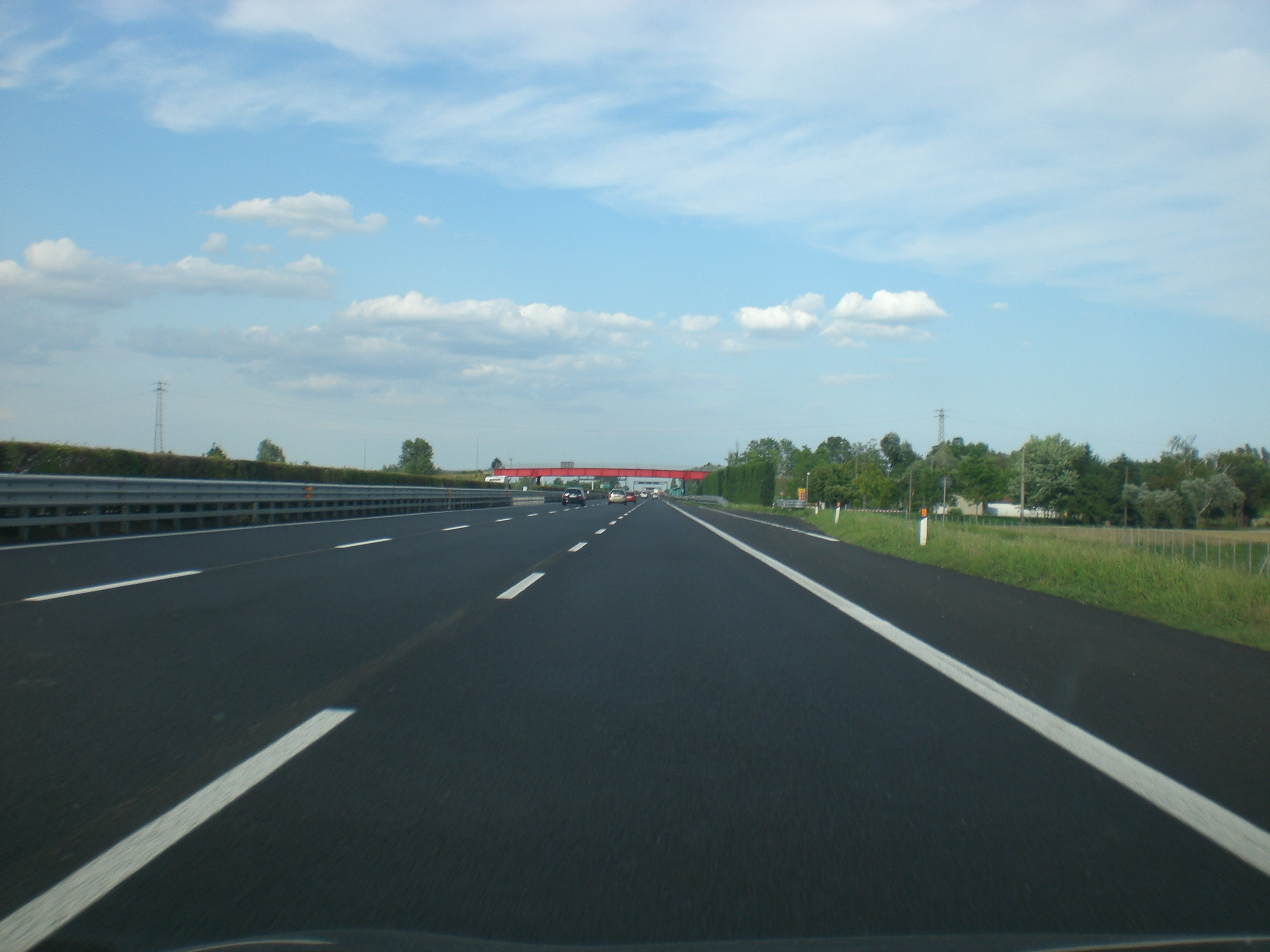
Autostrada A57 near Mira

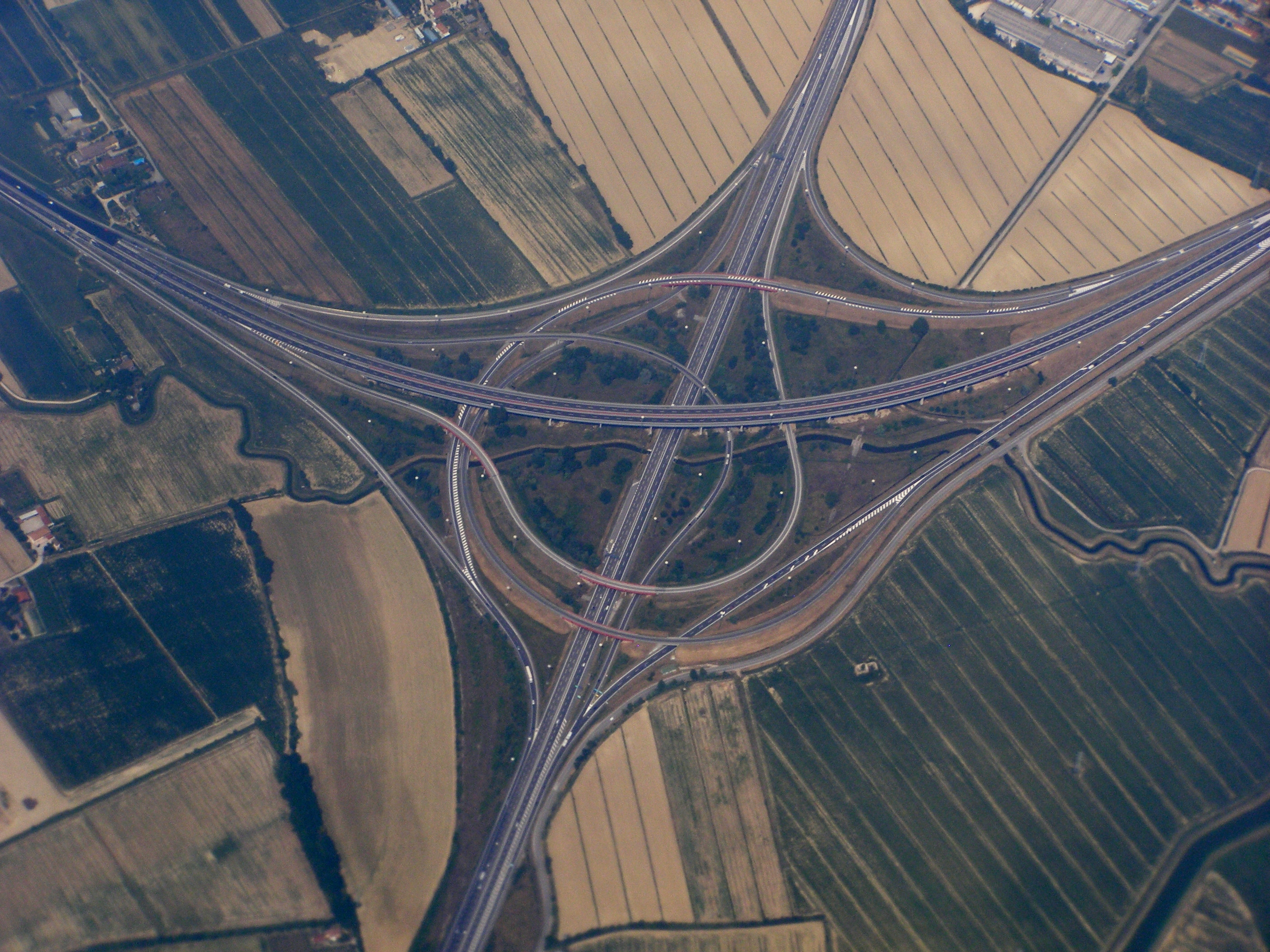
Stack interchange between Autostrada A57 and Autostrada A27

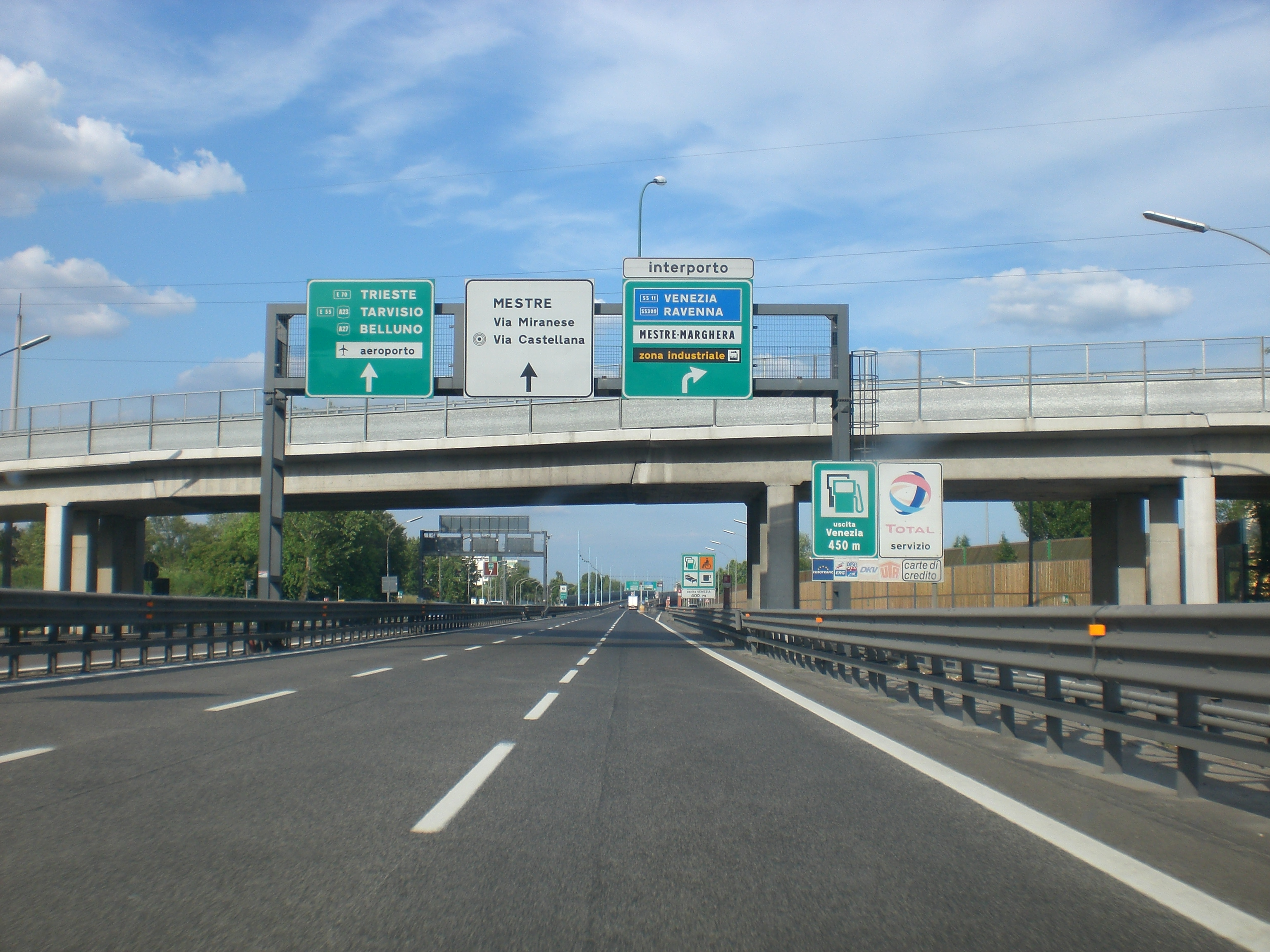
Autostrada A57 near Quarto d'Altino

TANGENZIALE DI MESTRE; Autostrada A57
Exit	↓km↓	↑km↑	Province	European Route
Milano-Trieste	0.0 km (0 mi)	26.7 km (16.6 mi)	VE	--
Mirano - Dolo	2.7 km (1.7 mi)	24.0 km (14.9 mi)	VE	--
Mira - Oriago	7.5 km (4.7 mi)	19.2 km (11.9 mi)	VE	--
Toll gate Venezia Mestre	9.2 km (5.7 mi)	17.5 km (10.9 mi)	VE	--
Venezia - Marghera; Romea	10.3 km (6.4 mi)	15.6 km (9.7 mi)	VE	E55
Rest area "Marghera"	11.1 km (6.9 mi)	15.3 km (9.5 mi)	VE	E55
Venezia (Note: Westbound exit and eastbound entrance; the previous Venezia Marghera junction is used for the east exit and west entrance); Padana Superiore; Port of Marghera	11.6 km (7.2 mi)	15.1 km (9.4 mi)	VE	E55
Venezia - Miranese	12.5 km (7.8 mi)	14.2 km (8.8 mi)	VE	E55
Venezia - Castellana; Castellana	14.5 km (9.0 mi)	12.2 km (7.6 mi)	VE	E55
Venezia - Terraglio di Mestre	16.4 km (10.2 mi)	10.3 km (6.4 mi)	VE	E55
Rest area "Bazzera"	17.7 km (11.0 mi)	9.0 km (5.6 mi)	VE	E55
Belluno; Diramazione aeroporto Marco Polo	19.5 km (12.1 mi)	7.2 km (4.5 mi)	VE	E55
Marcon	21.6 km (13.4 mi)	5.1 km (3.2 mi)	VE	E55
Quarto d'Altino	24.9 km (15.5 mi)	1.8 km (1.1 mi)	TV	E55
Toll gate Venezia est	25.2 km (15.7 mi)	1.5 km (0.93 mi)	TV	E55
Milano-Trieste	26.7 km (16.6 mi)	0.0 km (0 mi)	VE	E55

=== Marco Polo Airport connection ===
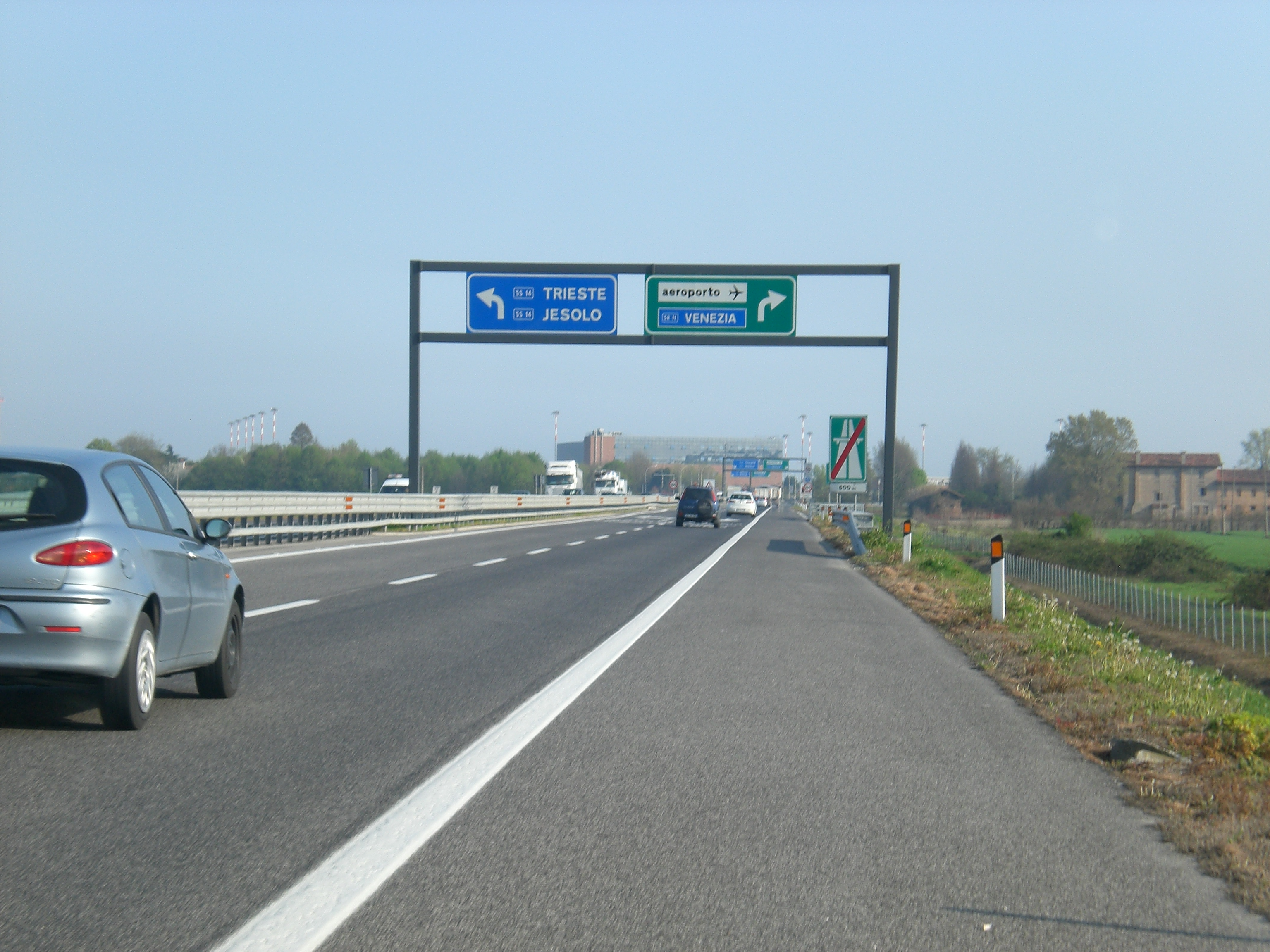
Marco Polo Airport connection

DIRAMAZIONE AEROPORTO MARCO POLO; Marco Polo Airport connection
Exit	↓km↓	↑km↑	Province	European Route
della Venezia Giulia; Venice Marco Polo Airport - Venezia; Trieste - Jesolo	0.0 km (0 mi)	6.5 km (4.0 mi)	VE	--
Dese - Marcon	3.5 km (2.2 mi)	3.0 km (1.9 mi)	VE	--
Tangenziale di Mestre; Milano-Trieste	5.2 km (3.2 mi)	1.3 km (0.81 mi)	VE	--
Belluno	6.5 km (4.0 mi)	0.0 km (0 mi)	VE	--

== See also ==
- Autostrade of Italy
- Roads in Italy
- Transport in Italy

=== Other Italian roads ===
- State highways (Italy)
- Regional road (Italy)
- Provincial road (Italy)
- Municipal road (Italy)
