= Siculiana Marina =

- Frazione
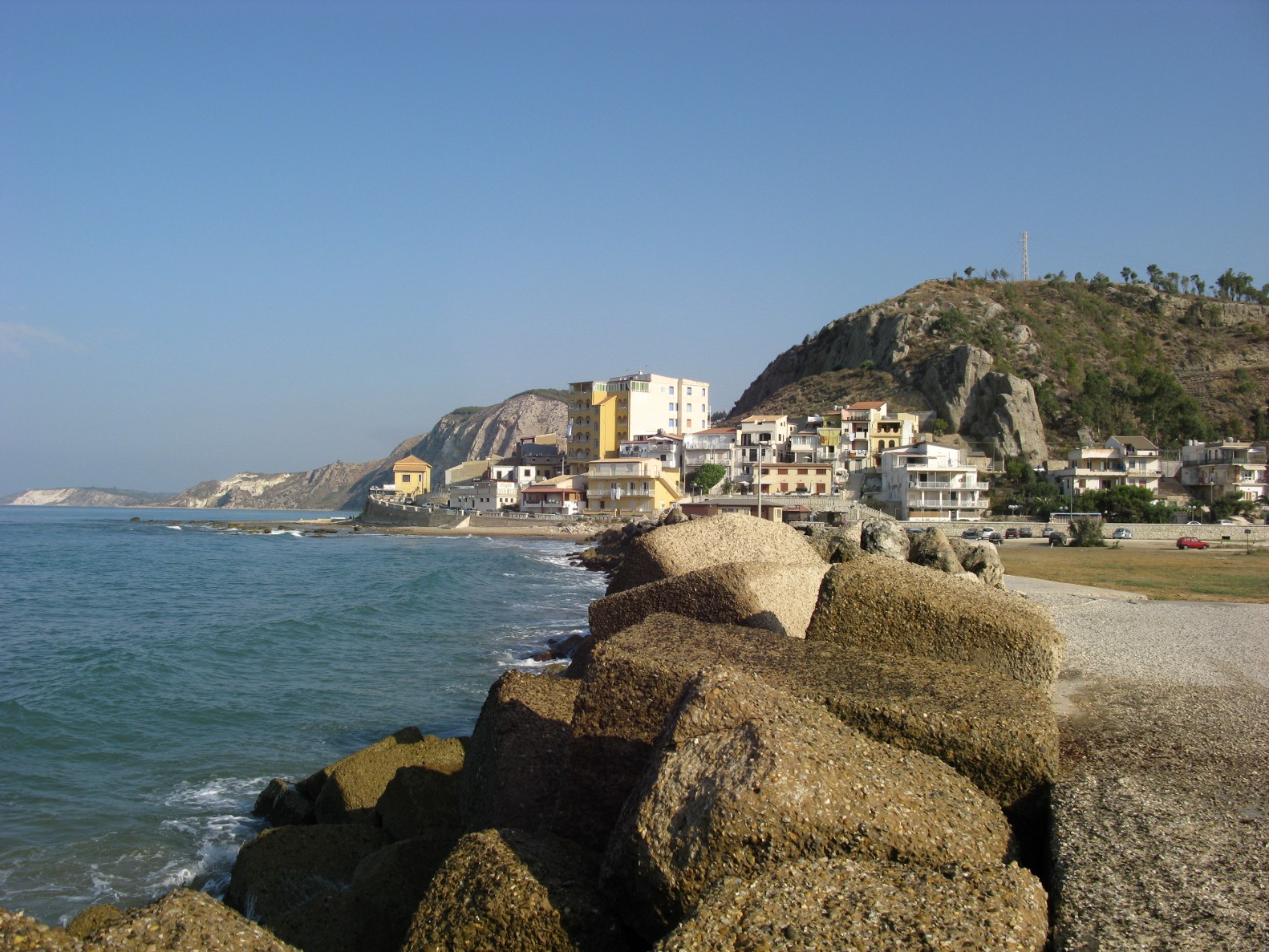
- Beach of Siculiana Marina

- Location of Siculiana Marina in Italy
- Coordinates: 37.335556°N 13.4225°E
- Country: Italy
- Region: Sicily
- Province: Agrigento (AG)
- Comune: Scicli
- Elevation: 12 m (39 ft)

Population
  - Total: 29
- Time zone: UTC+1 (CET)
  - Summer (DST): UTC+2 (CEST)
- Postal code: 92010
- Dialing code: (+39) 0922

Siculiana Marina is a southern Italian seaside village of Siculiana, a municipality part of the Province of Agrigento, Sicily.

It has a population of 29.

== Geography ==
Siculiana Marina is located by the Mediterranean Sea coast of the island of Sicily and is 3.05 kilometres (1.90 mi) from Siculiana, to which it belongs. It rises 12 meters above sea level.
