= European route E933 =

Road in trans-European E-road network

E933

Route information
- Length: 50 km (31 mi)

Major junctions
- From: Alcamo (Italy)
- To: Trapani (Italy)

Location
- Countries: Italy

Highway system
- International E-road network; A Class; B Class

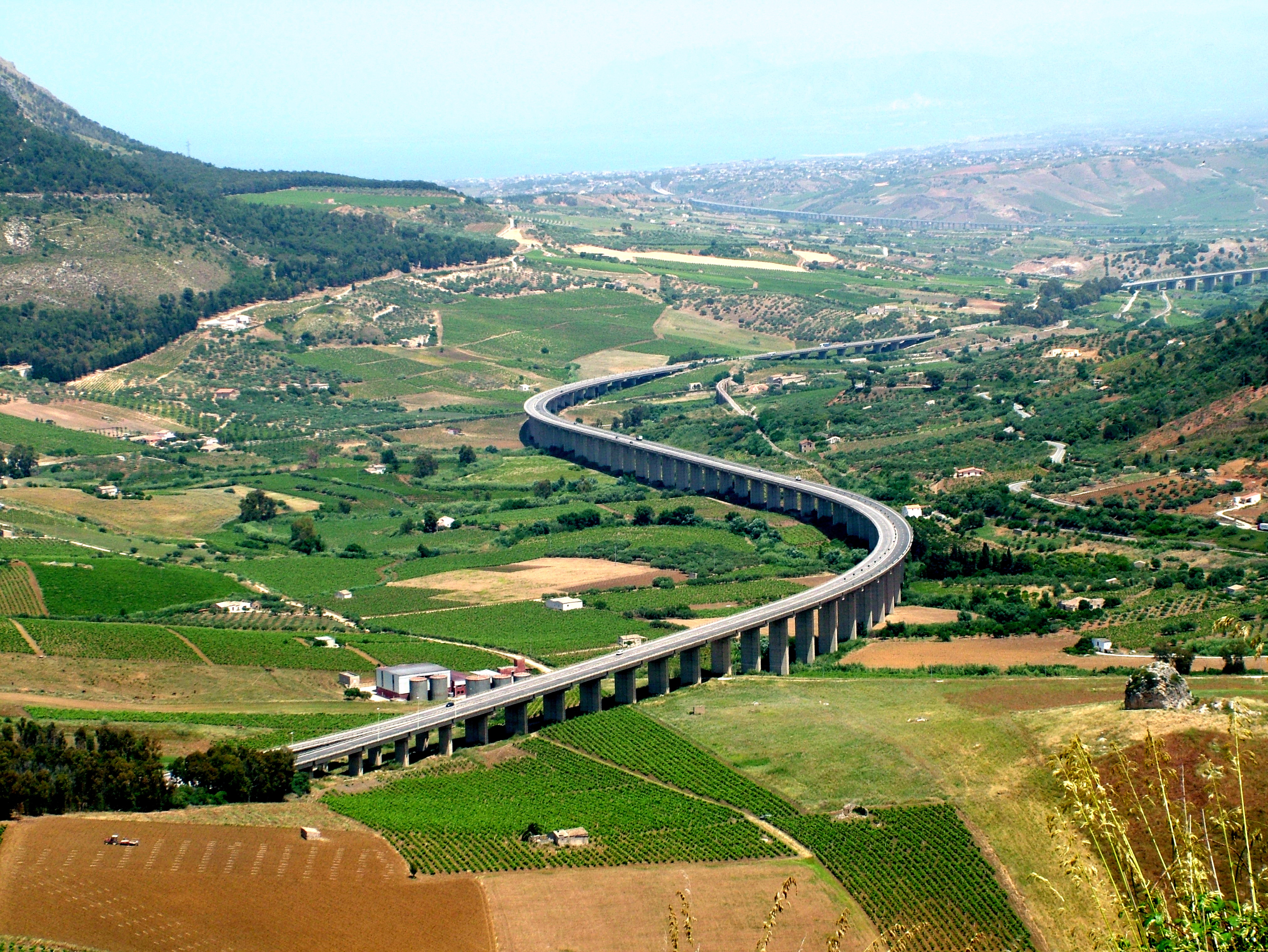
European route 933 near Calatafimi Segesta.

European route E 933 is a European B class road in Italy, connecting the city Alcamo – Trapani.

== Route ==
- Italy
  - E90 Alcamo
  - E45 Trapani
