= Siracusa–Gela–Canicattì railway =

Railway line in Italy

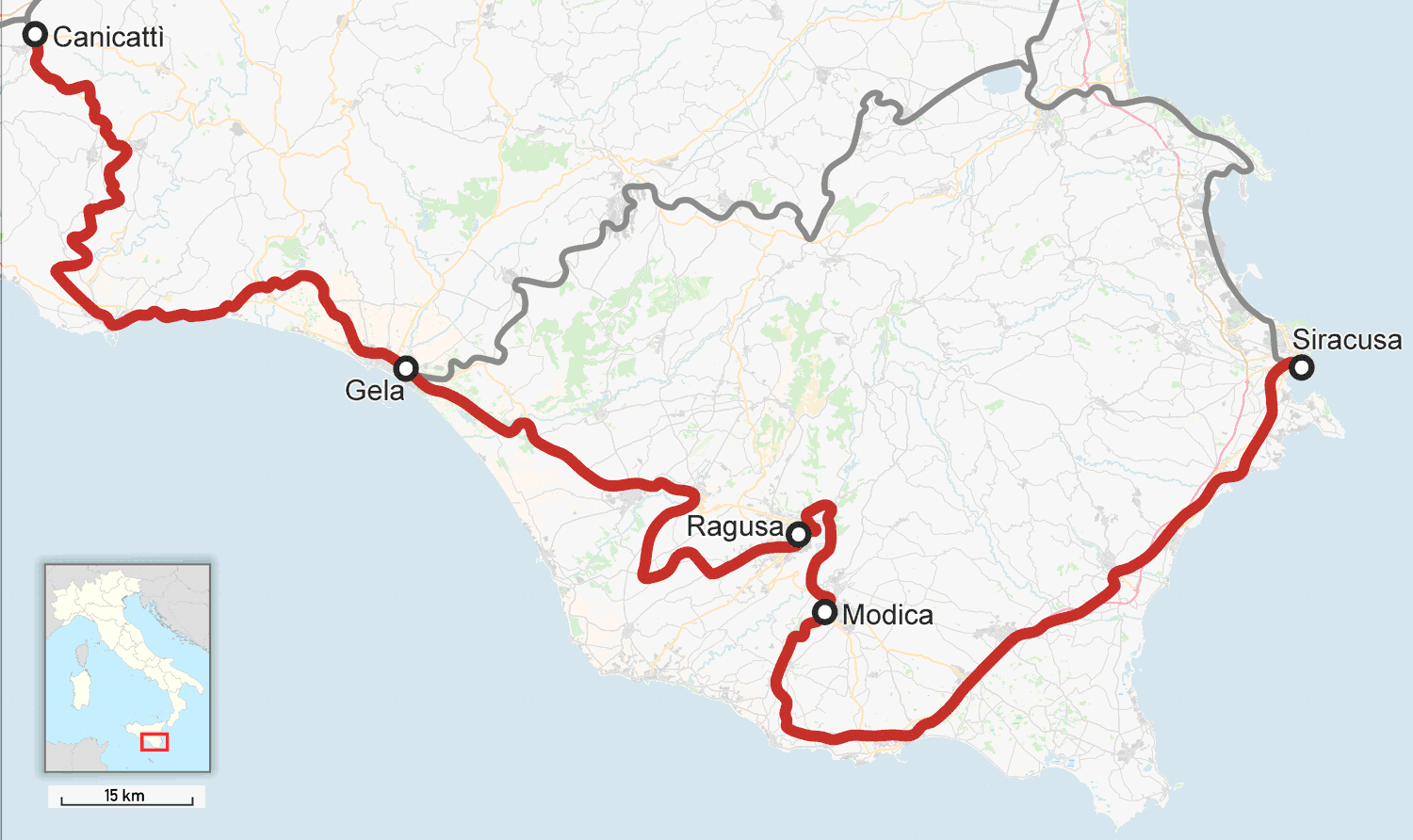

Overview
- Native name: Ferrovia Siracusa–Gela–Canicattì
- Termini: Siracusa railway station; Canicattì railway station
- Stations: Gela railway station

Service
- Type: heavy rail
- Operator(s): Rete Ferroviaria Italiana

Technical
- Number of tracks: Single
- Track gauge: 1,435 mm (4 ft 8 1/2 in)
- Electrification: No

The Siracusa–Gela–Canicattì railway is a single-track line in Sicily, Italy managed by RFI. The route connects Syracuse on the Ionian side of Sicily to the Mediterranean side, crossing, with an east-west route, a number of large urban centers to Canicattì.

== History of route section openings ==
- Canicattì–Campobello di Licata
- Campobello di Licata–Favarotta – 23 May 1880
- Favarotta–Licata – 24 February 1881
- Syracuse–Noto – 5 April 1886
- Licata–Licata jetty – 26 November 1888
- Licata–Gela – 29 March 1891
- Noto–Modica – 23 December 1891
- Syracuse–Stazione di Siracusa Marittima – 13 August 1892
- Gela–Comiso – 14 March 1893
- Comiso–Modica – 18 June 1893

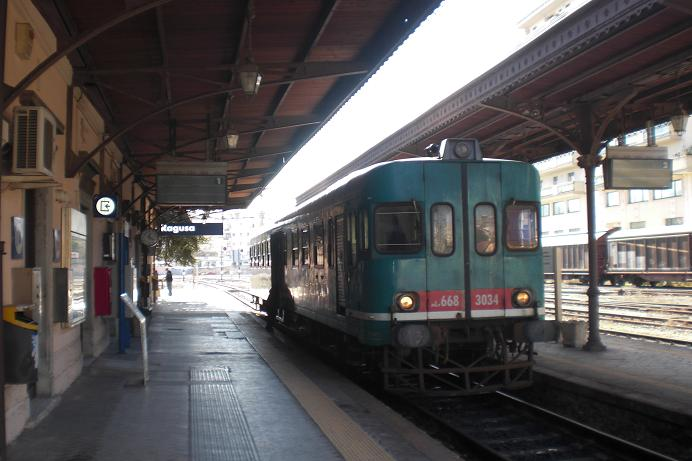
FS Class ALn 668 diesel railcar at Ragusa station

== See also ==
- List of railway lines in Italy
- Sulfur mining in Sicily
