= European route E931 =

Road in trans-European E-road network

E931

Route information
- Length: 187 km (116 mi)

Major junctions
- From: Mazara del Vallo
- Castelvetrano
- To: Gela

Location
- Countries: Italy

Highway system
- International E-road network; A Class; B Class

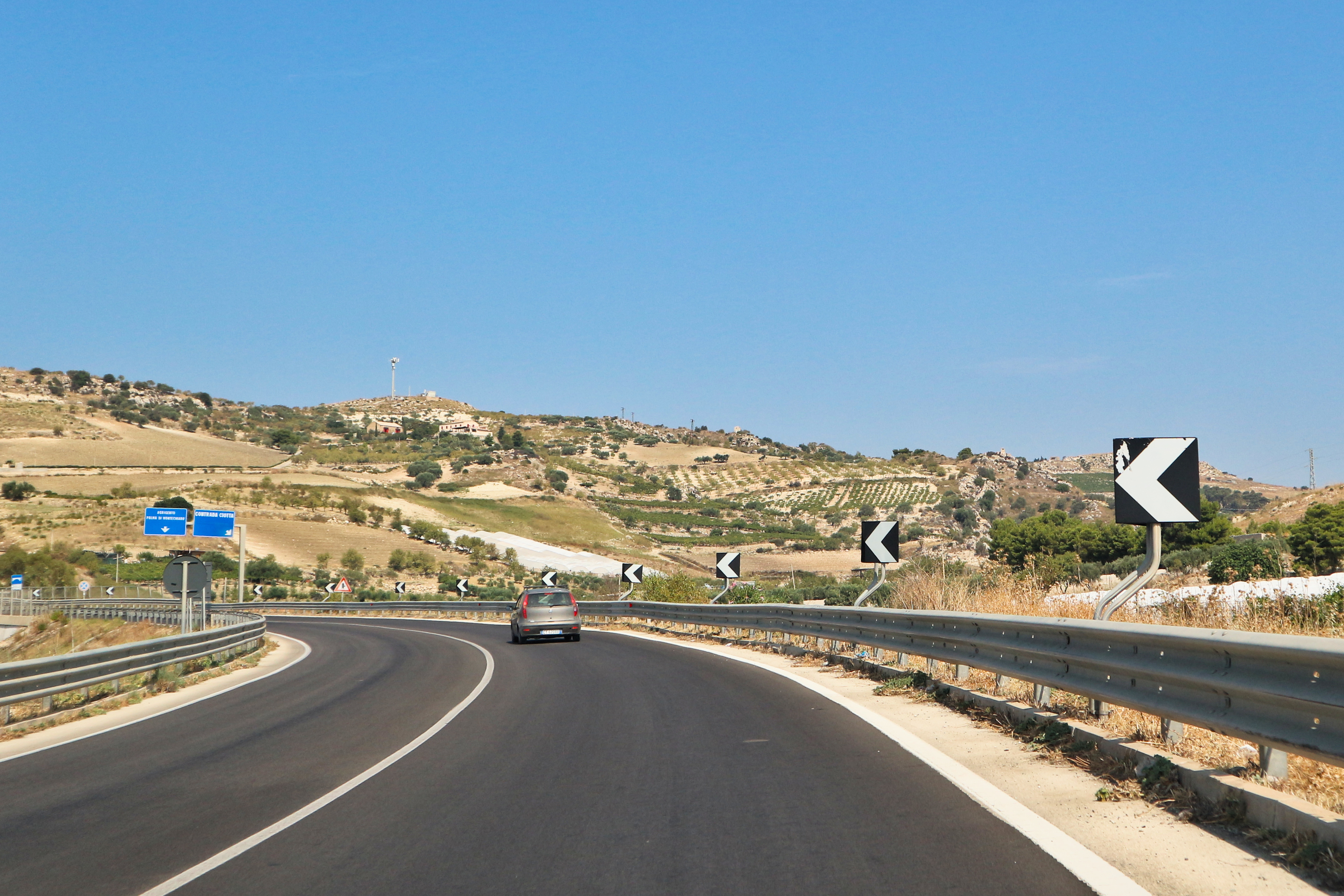
European route 931 near Palma di Montechiaro.

European route E 931 is a European B class road in Italy, connecting the city Mazara del Vallo – Gela.

== Route ==
- Italy
  - Mazara del Vallo
  - Castelvetrano
  - Gela
