= Fiume Veneto =

- Comune
- Comune di Fiume Veneto
- Coat of arms

- Location within Italy Location within Friuli-Venezia Giulia
- Coordinates: 45°56′N 12°44′E
- Country: Italy
- Region: Friuli-Venezia Giulia
- Province: Pordenone (PN)
- Frazioni: Cimpello, Pescincanna, Bannia, Praturlone

Government
  - Mayor: Jessica Canton

Area
  - Total: 35.8 km^{2} (13.8 sq mi)
- Elevation: 20 m (66 ft)

Population (31 December 2012)
  - Total: 11,716
  - Density: 327/km^{2} (848/sq mi)
- Demonym: Fiumani
- Time zone: UTC+1 (CET)
  - Summer (DST): UTC+2 (CEST)
- Postal code: 33080
- Dialing code: 0434
- Patron saint: St. Nicholas of Bari
- Website: Official website

Fiume Veneto (Venetian: Fiume; standard Friulian: Vile di Flum; Western Friulian: Flum or Vildiflùm) is a comune (municipality) in the Regional decentralization entity of Pordenone, in the Italian region of Friuli-Venezia Giulia, located about 90 kilometres (56 miles) northwest of Trieste and about 7 kilometres (4 mi) southeast of Pordenone.

Fiume Veneto borders the following municipalities: Azzano Decimo, Casarsa della Delizia, Chions, Pordenone, San Vito al Tagliamento, Zoppola.

== Twin towns ==
Fiume Veneto is twinned with:

- Sirnitz, Austria, since 5 September 1993
- Hude, Germany, since 6 July 2002
- Castelsarrasin, France, since 22 September 2007

== People ==
- Federico Barbaro (1913–1996), Italian missionary in Japan, teacher, translator and essayist
