= Siculiana =

- Comune
- Comune di Siculiana
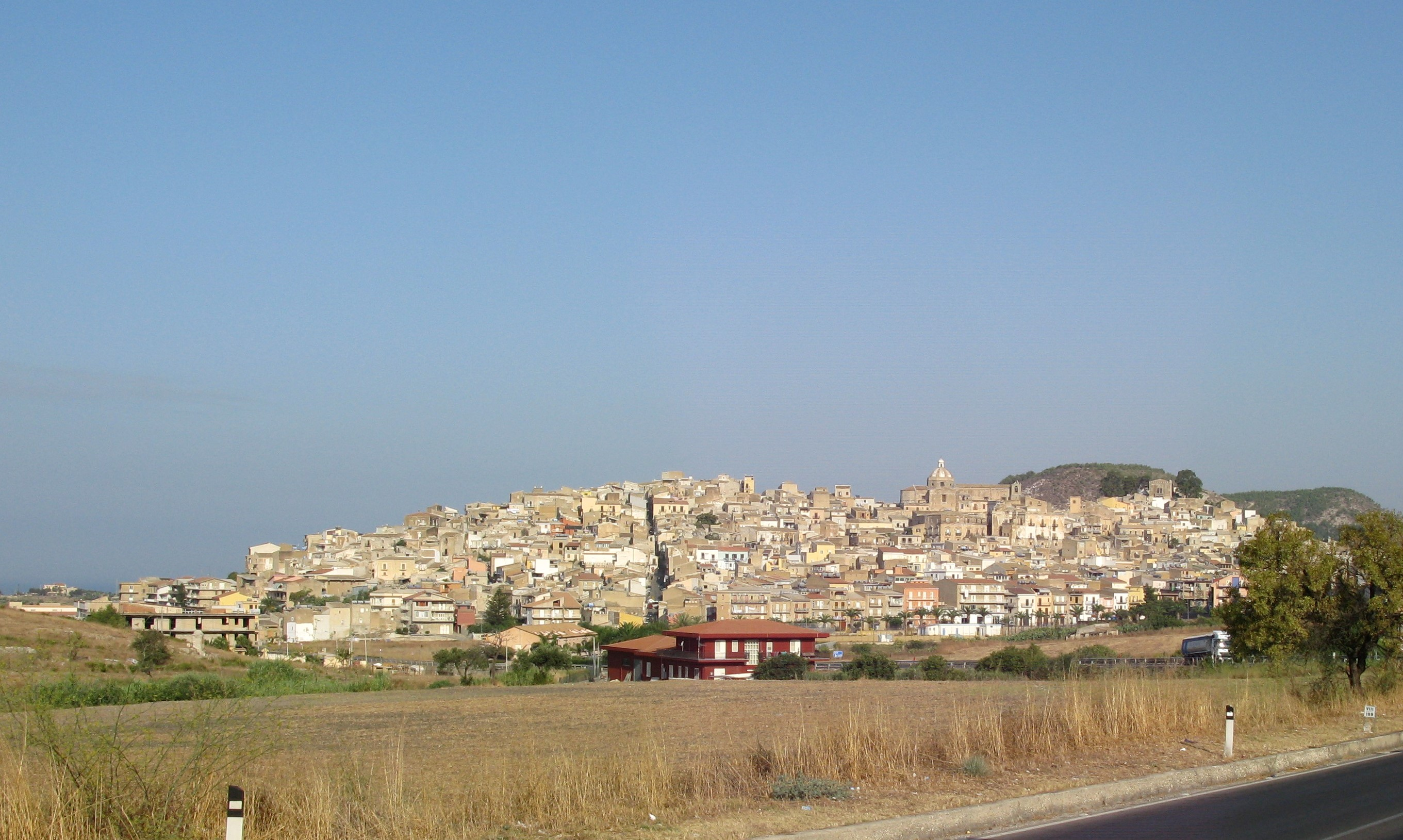
- View of Siculiana

- Coat of arms

- Location within Italy Location within Sicily
- Coordinates: 37°20′N 13°25′E
- Country: Italy
- Region: Sicily
- Province: Agrigento (AG)
- Frazioni: Siculiana Marina

Government
  - Mayor: Giuseppe Zambito

Area
  - Total: 40 km^{2} (15 sq mi)
- Elevation: 120 m (390 ft)

Population (2017)
  - Total: 4,471
  - Density: 110/km^{2} (290/sq mi)
- Demonym: Siculianesi
- Time zone: UTC+1 (CET)
  - Summer (DST): UTC+2 (CEST)
- Postal code: 92010
- Dialing code: 0922
- Patron saint: SS. Crucifix
- Saint day: May 3
- Website: Official website

Siculiana is a town and comune in the province of Agrigento, Sicily, southern Italy, 13 kilometres (8 mi) west of the provincial capital Agrigento.

== History ==
According to some historians, the name derives from the distortion of the Arabic Suq al Jani ("John's market"), while others believe its origin stems from Suqu 'l Yuni or Supu 'l Yunani ("Market of the Greeks").

The medieval hamlet of Siculiana was founded in 1310 by Frederick II Chiaramonte. Frederick constructed a castle, parts of which still exist today, on the ruins of the Arab fortress known as "Kalat Sugul", which had been destroyed in 1087 during the conquest of Sicily by Roger I.

== Geography ==
Siculiana’s 13-kilometre (8 mi) long coast line is largely unspoiled; a protected Regional Nature Reserve has been established in the locality of Torre Salsa for its natural beauty and environmental interest.

Siculiana Marina is a suburban seaside village of Siculiana on the Strait of Sicily. Once an important settlement for maritime trade in the Mediterranean, with a prominent commercial Marketplace emporium, it is now a popular summer resort. The Caricatore (Loading Dock) was still active up to the end of 19th century.

== Monuments and traditions ==
The ruins of the once-embattled Castello Chiaramonte is a prominent feature of the landscape. Within the city, the Baroque church Santuario del Santissimo Crocifisso is a well-known landmark. Inside is revered the Black Crucifix, which was moved to the church in 1611 from the castle in which it was previously kept. Every 3rd of May, the statue is carried in procession with typical abrupt movements and dips of the float, which popular belief attributes to the will of the saint.

== People ==
- Francesco Agnello, Baron of Siculiana, musicologist, president of the Association "Amici della musica" - Palermo
- Frank Sivero, an American character actor
- Giuseppe Basile, Surgeon - Doctor of Garibaldi
- Blasco Isfar e Corillas, Baron of Siculiana
- Alfred Polizzi, mafia boss of the Cleveland crime family
- Nicola Gentile, Sicilian mafioso in New York City
