= SS234 =

SS234, SS 234 or SS-234 may refer to:

== Military ==
- USS Kingfish (SS-234), a Gato-class submarine

== Transportation ==
- Strada statale 234 Codognese (SS 234), a former Italian state highway
