= SS235 =

SS235, SS 235 or SS-235 may refer to:

== Military ==
- USS Shad (SS-235), a Gato-class submarine

== Transportation ==
- Strada statale 235 di Orzinuovi (SS 235), a former Italian state highway
