= SS310 =

SS310, SS 310 or SS-310 may refer to:

== Military ==
- USS Batfish (SS-310)

== Transportation ==
- Strada statale 310 del Bidente (SS 310), a former Italian state highway
