= Strada statale 234 Codognese =

Former state highway in Italy

State Highway 234
- Strada statale 234
- Codognese

Route information
- Maintained by ANAS
- Length: 73.6 km (45.7 mi) Decreto Ministeriale 16-11-1959
- Existed: 1959–2000

Major junctions
- From: Pavia
- To: Cremona

Location
- Country: Italy
- Regions: Lombardy

Highway system
- Roads in Italy; Autostrade; State; Regional; Provincial; Municipal
| ← SS 233 | → SS 235 |

The strada statale 234 "Codognese" (SS 234) was an Italian state highway 73.6 kilometres (45.7 mi) long in Italy in the region of Lombardy, created in 1959 and disestablished in 2000. It began in Pavia and ended in Cremona, going through the Po Valley.

== History ==
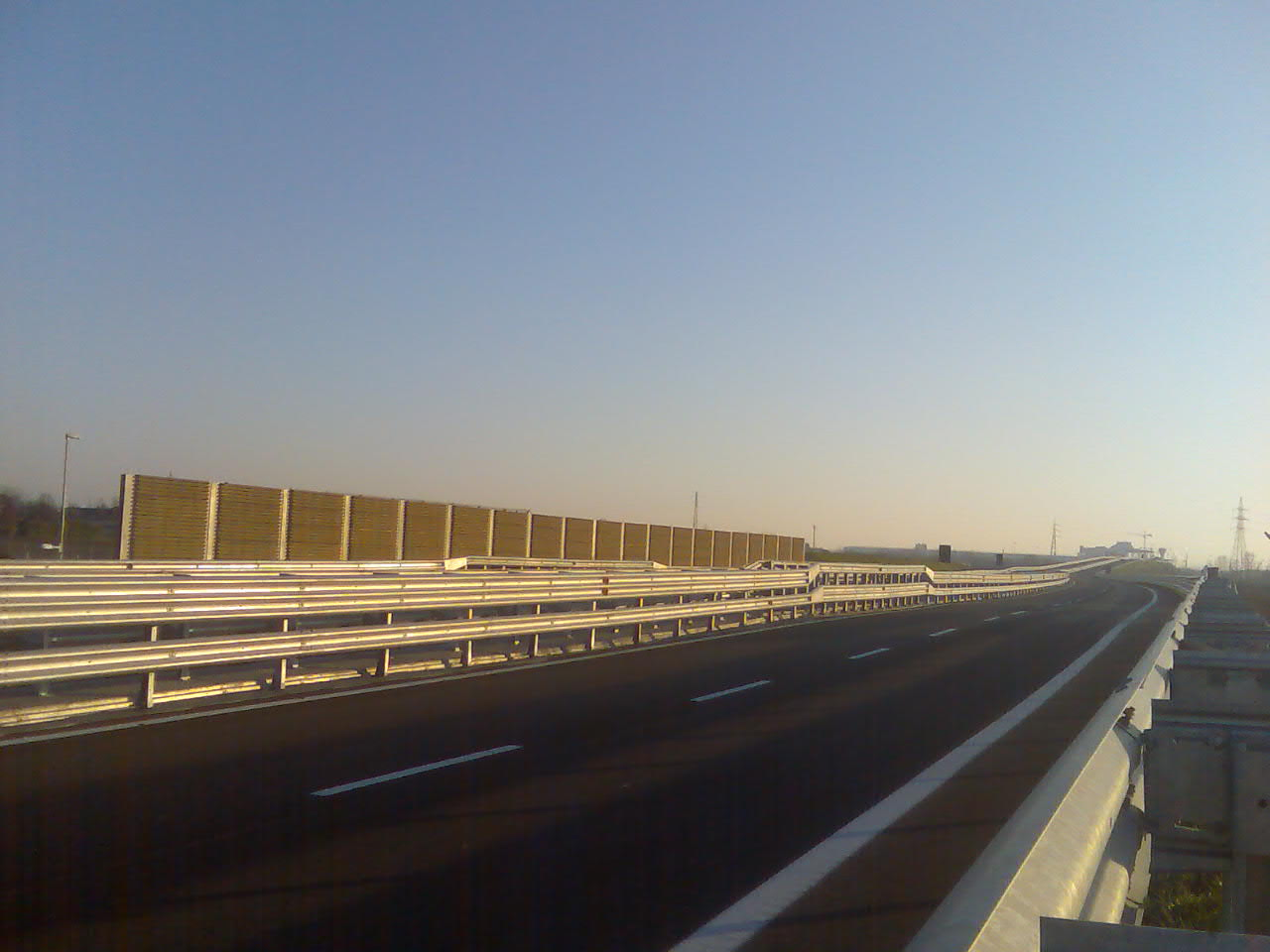
Strada statale 234 Codognese in Cremona

The road was created in 1959 with the following route: "Junction with the state road nr. 35 in Pavia – Codogno – Junction with the state road n. 10 in Cremona." and a length of 73.600 km (45.733 mi). The road was called "Codognese", from the town of Codogno located along it.

In 1998 the government decided to devolve to the Regions all the state roads that were not considered of "national importance". The list of those roads, compiled in 2000, defined the state road nr. 234 of "regional interest", and therefore it was devolved to the Lombardy region. At this time, the road resulted 72.395 km (44.984 mi) long.

== See also ==
- State highways (Italy)
- Roads in Italy
- Transport in Italy

=== Other Italian roads ===
- Autostrade of Italy
- Regional road (Italy)
- Provincial road (Italy)
- Municipal road (Italy)
