= Strada statale 310 del Bidente =

Former state highway in Italy

State Highway 310
- Strada statale 310
- del Bidente
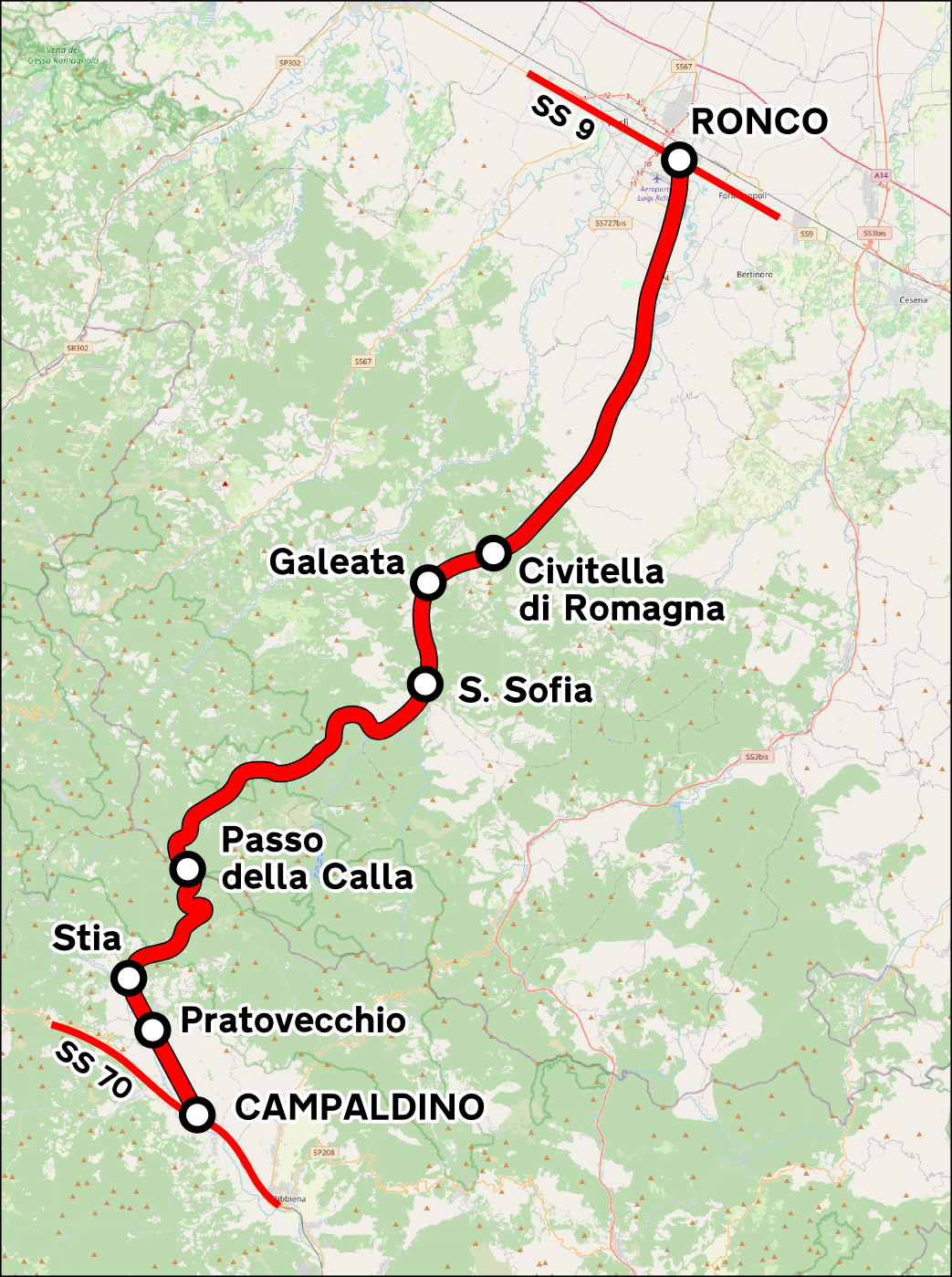

Route information
- Maintained by ANAS
- Length: 89.8 km (55.8 mi)
- Existed: 1962–2000

Major junctions
- From: SS 70 in Campaldino
- To: SS 9 in Ronco

Location
- Country: Italy
- Regions: Tuscany and Emilia-Romagna

Highway system
- Roads in Italy; Autostrade; State; Regional; Provincial; Municipal
← SS 309	→ SS 311

The strada statale 310 "del Bidente" (SS 310) was an Italian state highway 89.8 kilometres (55.8 mi) long in Italy in the regions of Tuscany and Emilia-Romagna, created in 1962 and disestablished in 2000. It began in Campaldino and ended in Ronco by Forlì, going through the Apennine Mountains between Tuscany and Emilia-Romagna.

== History ==
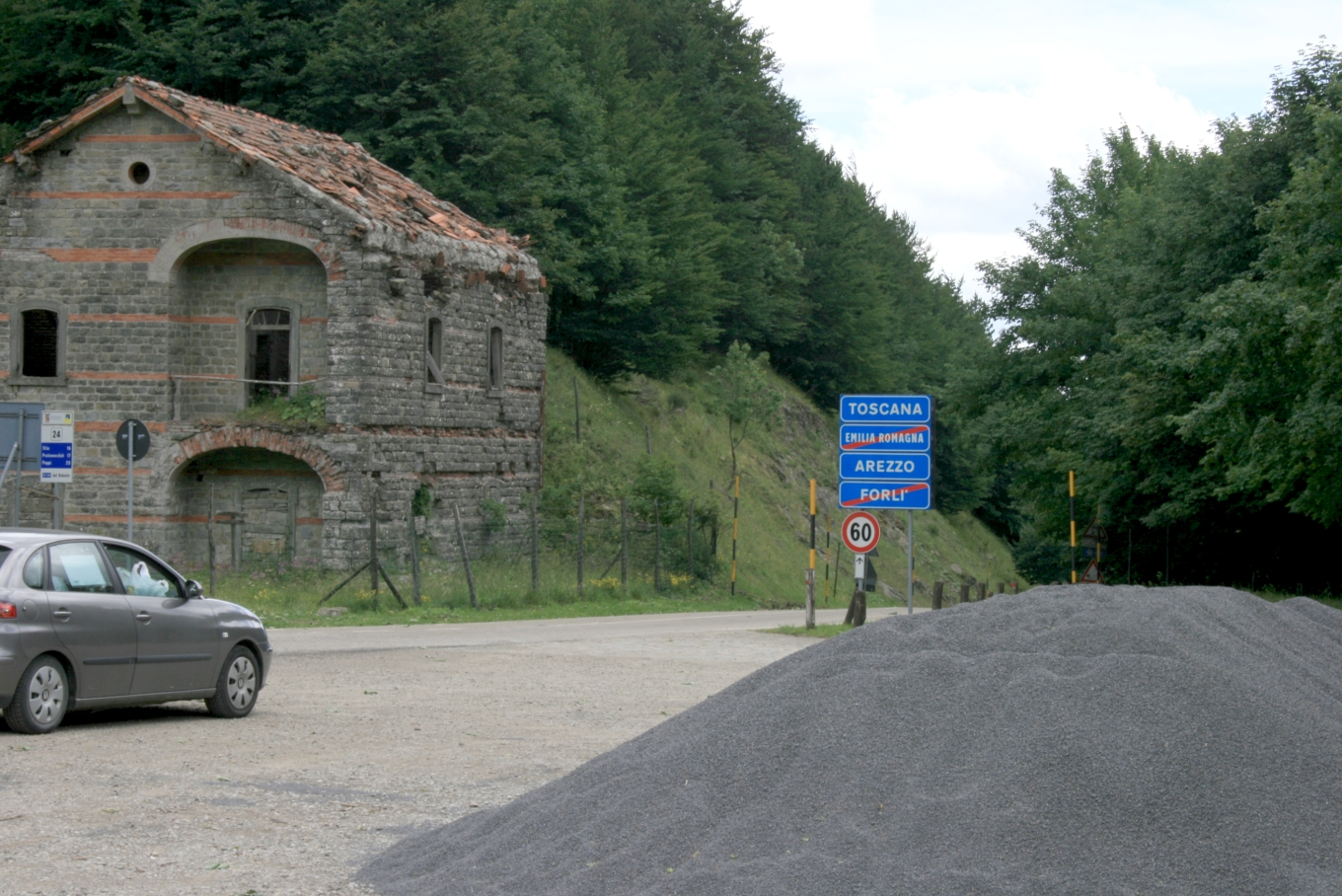
Strada statale 310 del Bidente near the Tuscany-Emilia-Romagna border

The road was created in 1959 with the following route: "Junction with the state road nr. 70 in Campaldino – Pratovecchio - Stia - Passo della Calla - Santa Sofia - Galeata - Civitella di Romagna – Junction with the state road n. 9 in Ronco." The road was called "del Bidente", from the name of the parallel river.

In 1998 the government decided to devolve to the Regions all the state roads that were not considered of "national importance". The list of those roads, compiled in 2000, defined the state road nr. 310 of "regional interest", and therefore it was devolved to the Tuscany and Emilia-Romagna region.

== See also ==
- State highways (Italy)
- Roads in Italy
- Transport in Italy

=== Other Italian roads ===
- Autostrade of Italy
- Regional road (Italy)
- Provincial road (Italy)
- Municipal road (Italy)
