= Strada statale 125 Orientale Sarda =

State highway in Italy

State Highway 125
- Strada statale 125
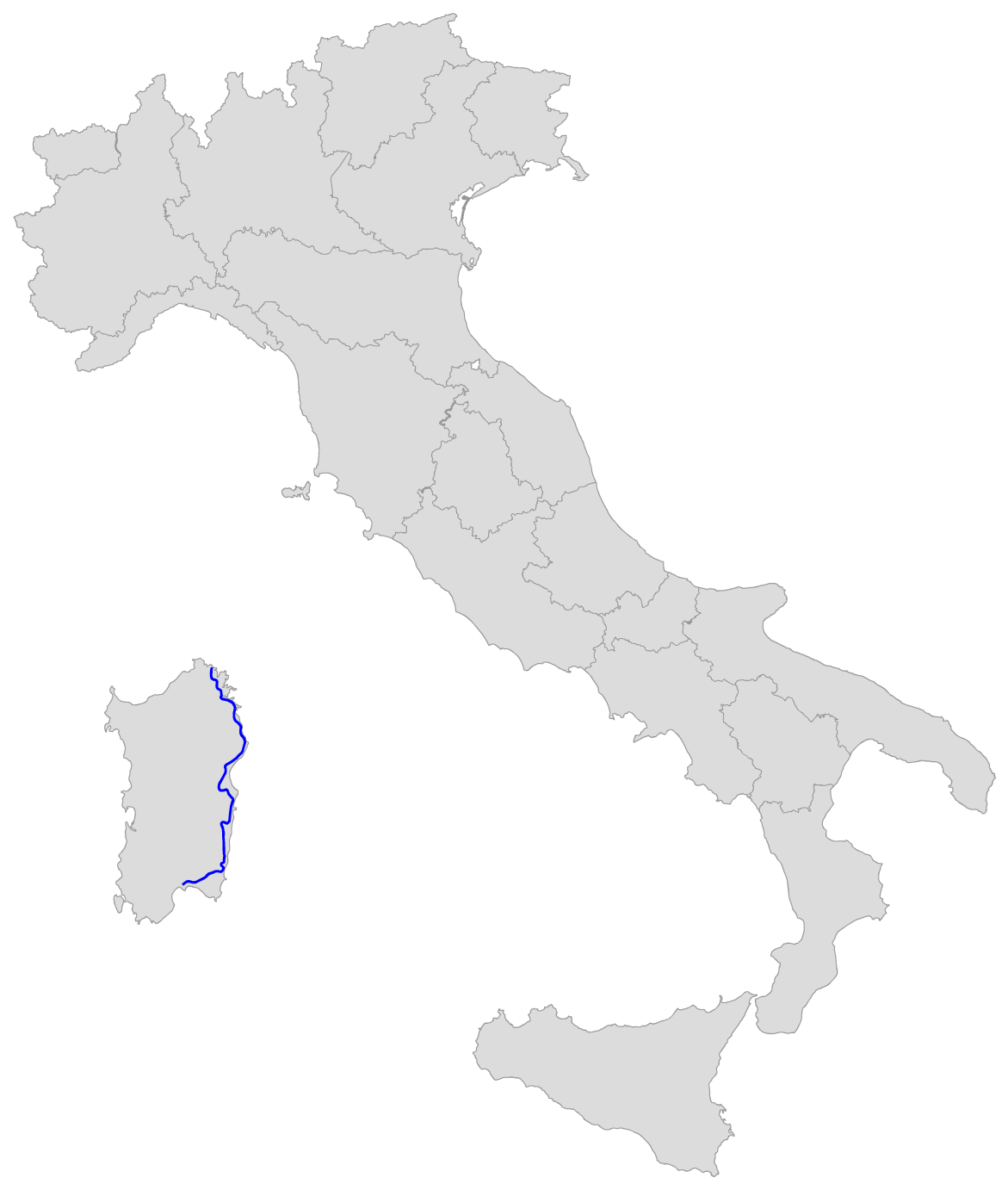

Route information
- Maintained by ANAS
- Length: 354.25 km (220.12 mi)
- Existed: 1928–present

Major junctions
- From: SS 554 at Quartucciu
- To: SS 133 at Palau

Location
- Country: Italy
- Regions: Sardinia

Highway system
- Roads in Italy; Autostrade; State; Regional; Provincial; Municipal
← SS 124	→ SS 125 dir

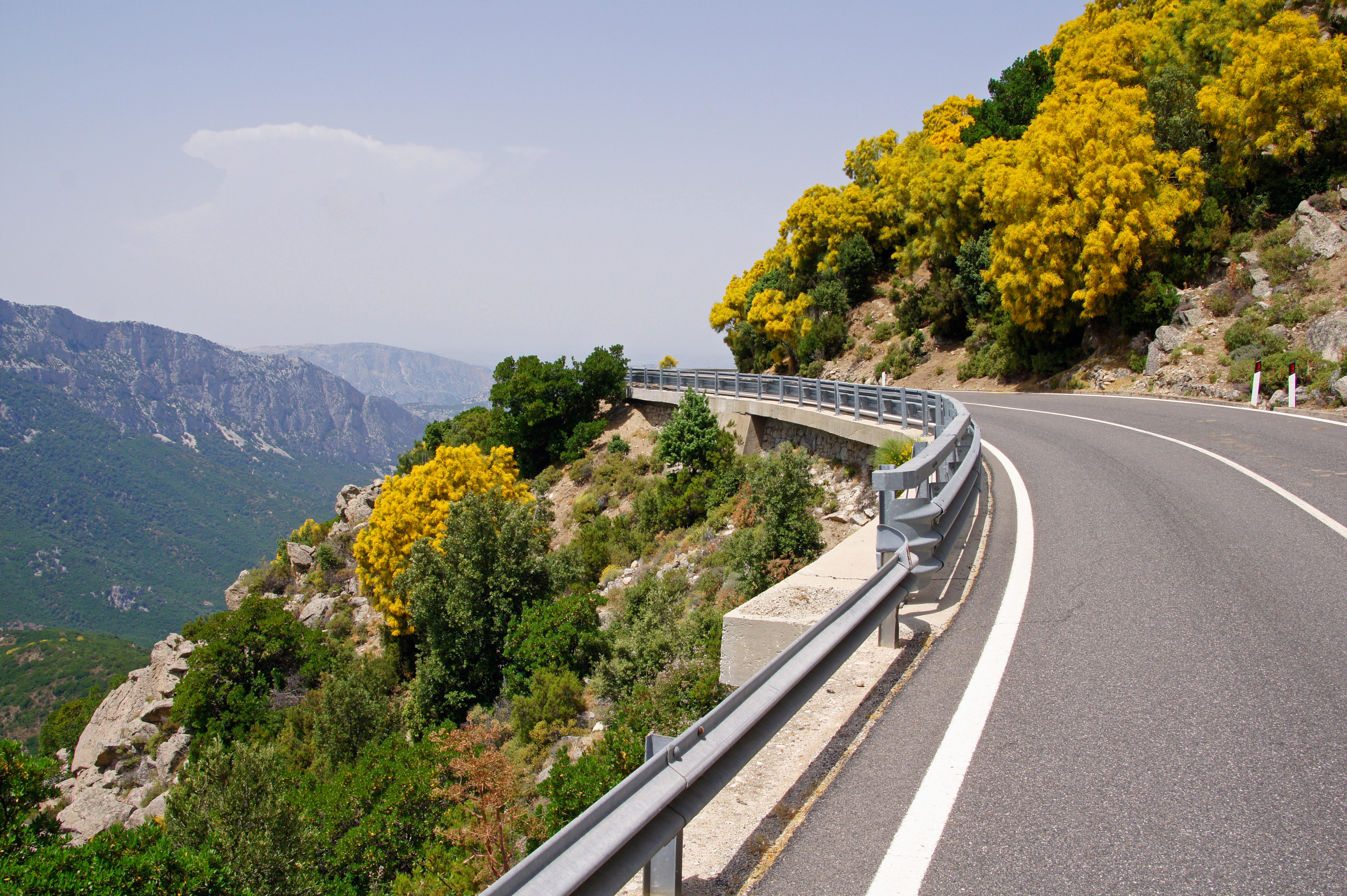
Strada statale 125 Orientale Sarda in Dorgali

Strada statale 125 Orientale Sarda (SS 125) is an Italian state highway 354.25 kilometres (220.12 mi) long in Italy located in the region of Sardinia. It is the fastest and oldest connecting road in eastern Sardinia connecting Quartucciu with Palau.

== See also ==
- State highways (Italy)
- Roads in Italy
- Transport in Italy

=== Other Italian roads ===
- Autostrade of Italy
- Regional road (Italy)
- Provincial road (Italy)
- Municipal road (Italy)
