= Strada statale 37 del Maloja =

State highway in Italy

State Highway 37
- Strada statale 37

Route information
- Maintained by ANAS
- Length: 10.01 km (6.22 mi)
- Existed: 1928–present

Major junctions
- From: Connection with the SS 36 in Chiavenna
- To: State border with Switzerland near Castasegna

Location
- Country: Italy
- Regions: Lombardy

Highway system
- Roads in Italy; Autostrade; State; Regional; Provincial; Municipal
← SS 36	→ SS 38

Strada statale 37 del Maloja is an Italian state highway 10.01 kilometres (6.22 mi) long in Italy located in the region of Lombardy.

The state road was established in 1928 with the name "del Maloia" and with the following route: "Chiavenna - Swiss border near Castasegna".

== See also ==
- State highways (Italy)
- Roads in Italy
- Transport in Italy

=== Other Italian roads ===
- Autostrade of Italy
- Regional road (Italy)
- Provincial road (Italy)
- Municipal road (Italy)
