= SS-48 =

SS-48, SS 48 or SS48 may refer to:

- BAP Pacocha (SS-48), a submarine of the Peruvian Navy which was received from the United States Navy in 1974, formerly known as the USS Atule (SS-403)
- USS L-8 (SS-48), a submarine of the United States Navy which saw service during World War I
- Strada statale 48 delle Dolomiti, the SS48 in Italy
