= Strada statale 235 di Orzinuovi =

Former state highway in Italy

State Highway 235
- Strada statale 235
- di Orzinuovi

Route information
- Maintained by ANAS
- Length: 99.89 km (62.07 mi) Decreto Ministeriale 16-11-1959
- Existed: 1959–2000

Major junctions
- From: Pavia
- To: Brescia

Location
- Country: Italy
- Regions: Lombardy

Highway system
- Roads in Italy; Autostrade; State; Regional; Provincial; Municipal
← SS 234	→ SS 236

The strada statale 235 "di Orzinuovi" (SS 235) was an Italian state highway 99.89 kilometres (62.07 mi) long in Italy in the region of Lombardy, created in 1959 and disestablished in 2000. It began in Pavia and ended in Brescia, going through the Po Valley.

== History ==
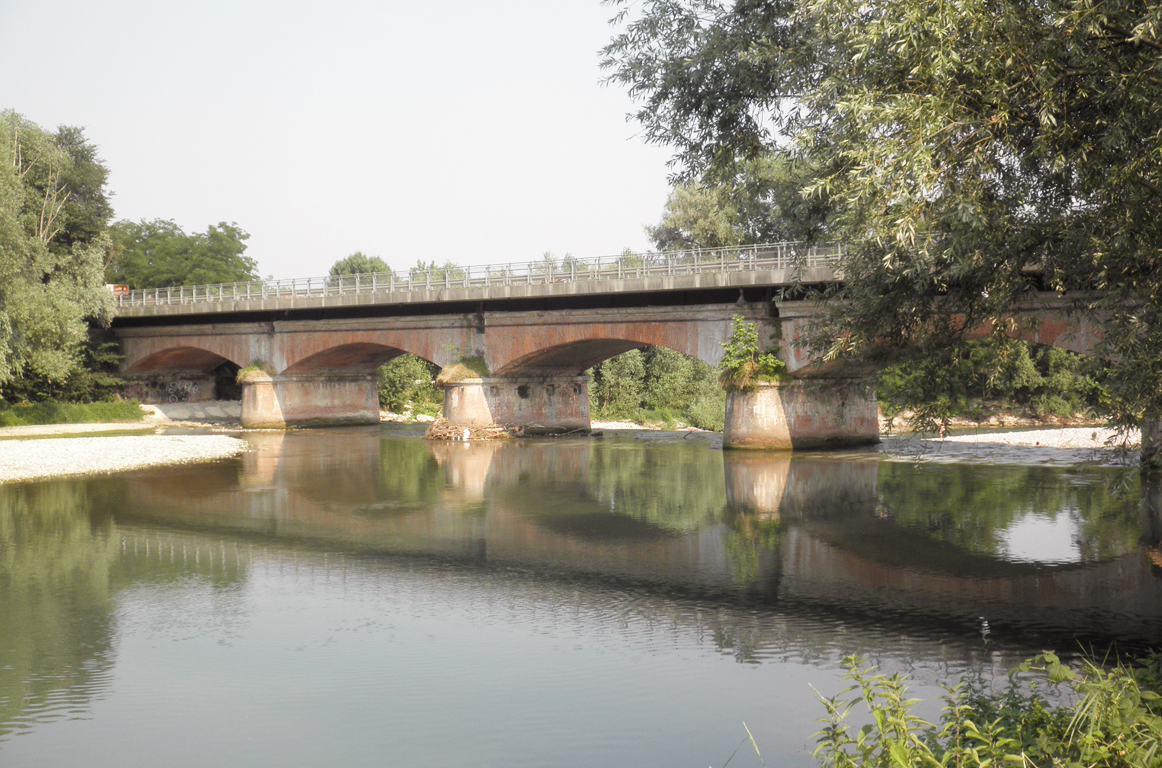
Bridge over the Oglio river by Orzinuovi

The road was created in 1959 with the following route: "Junction with the state road nr. 35 in Pavia – Crema – Junction with the state road n. 11 in Brescia." and a length of 99.889 km (62.068 mi). The road was called "di Orzinuovi", from the name of a town located along it.

In 1998 the government decided to devolve to the Regions all the state roads that were not considered of "national importance". The list of those roads, compiled in 2000, defined the state road nr. 235 of "regional interest", and therefore it was devolved to the Lombardy region. At this time, the road resulted 98.790 km (61.385 mi) long.

== See also ==
- State highways (Italy)
- Roads in Italy
- Transport in Italy

=== Other Italian roads ===
- Autostrade of Italy
- Regional road (Italy)
- Provincial road (Italy)
- Municipal road (Italy)
