= Strada statale 163 Amalfitana =

State highway in Italy

State Highway 163
- Strada statale 163
- Amalfitana

Route information
- Maintained by ANAS
- Length: 50.36 km (31.29 mi)
- Existed: 1953–present

Major junctions
- From: Sorrento
- To: Amalfi

Location
- Country: Italy
- Regions: Campania

Highway system
- Roads in Italy; Autostrade; State; Regional; Provincial; Municipal
← SS 158	→ SS 166

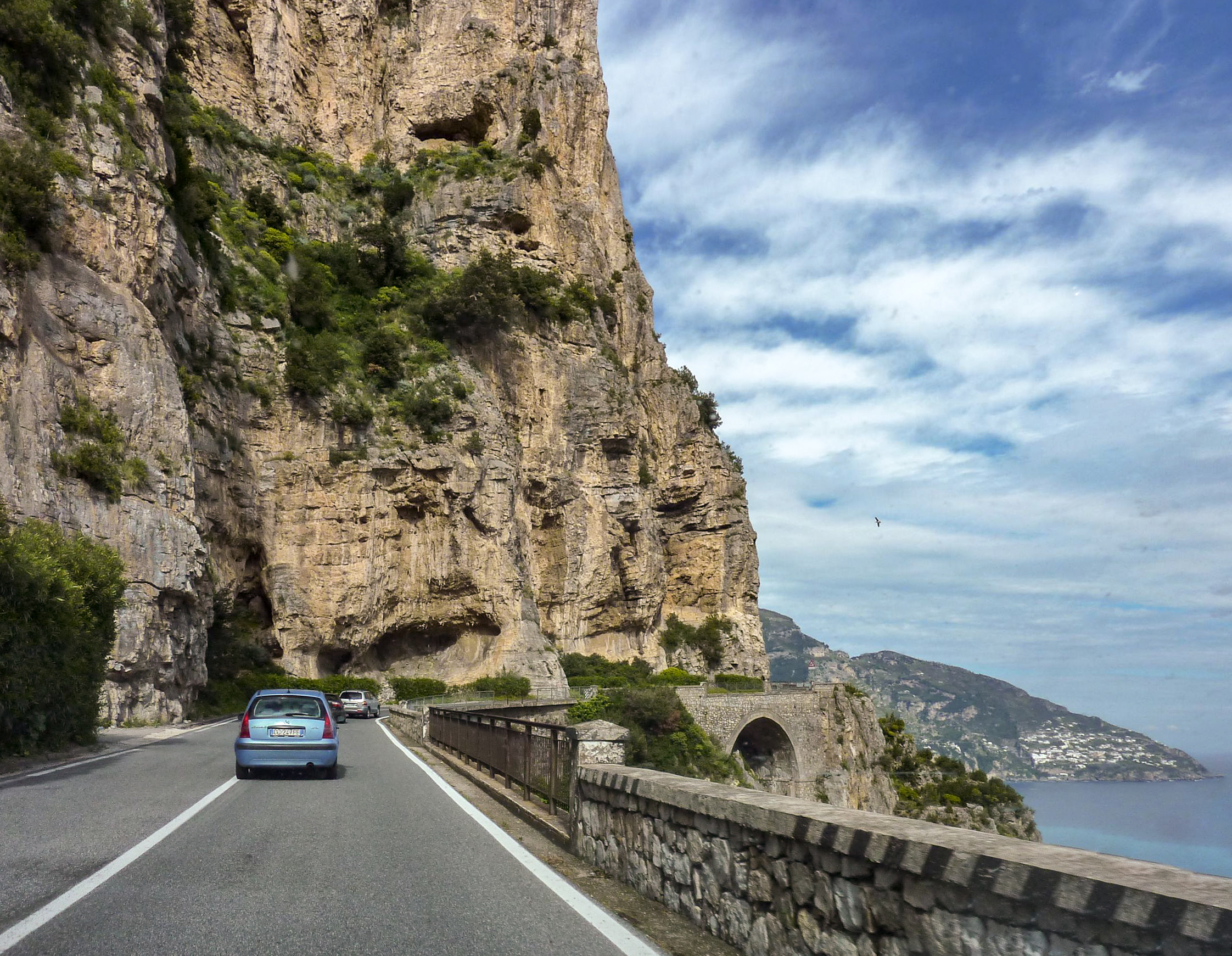
Strada statale 163 Amalfitana along the Amalfi Coast

The strada statale 163 Amalfitana (SS163), also known as Amalfi Drive, is an Italian state highway 50.36 kilometres (31.29 mi) long in Italy located in the region of Campania which runs along the stretch of the Amalfi Coast between the southern Italian towns of Sorrento and Amalfi. The drive between Salerno, at the southern base of the peninsula, and Positano follows the coast for about 80 km (50 mi).

For the greater part of its route, the road is carved out of the side of the coastal cliffs, giving views down to the Tyrrhenian Sea and on the other side up to the cliffs above. The road passes through the village of Positano, which is built on the side of the hill.

== See also ==
- State highways (Italy)
- Roads in Italy
- Transport in Italy

=== Other Italian roads ===
- Autostrade of Italy
- Regional road (Italy)
- Provincial road (Italy)
- Municipal road (Italy)
