= Strada statale 48 delle Dolomiti =

State highway in Italy

State Highway 48
- Strada statale 48
- delle Dolomiti
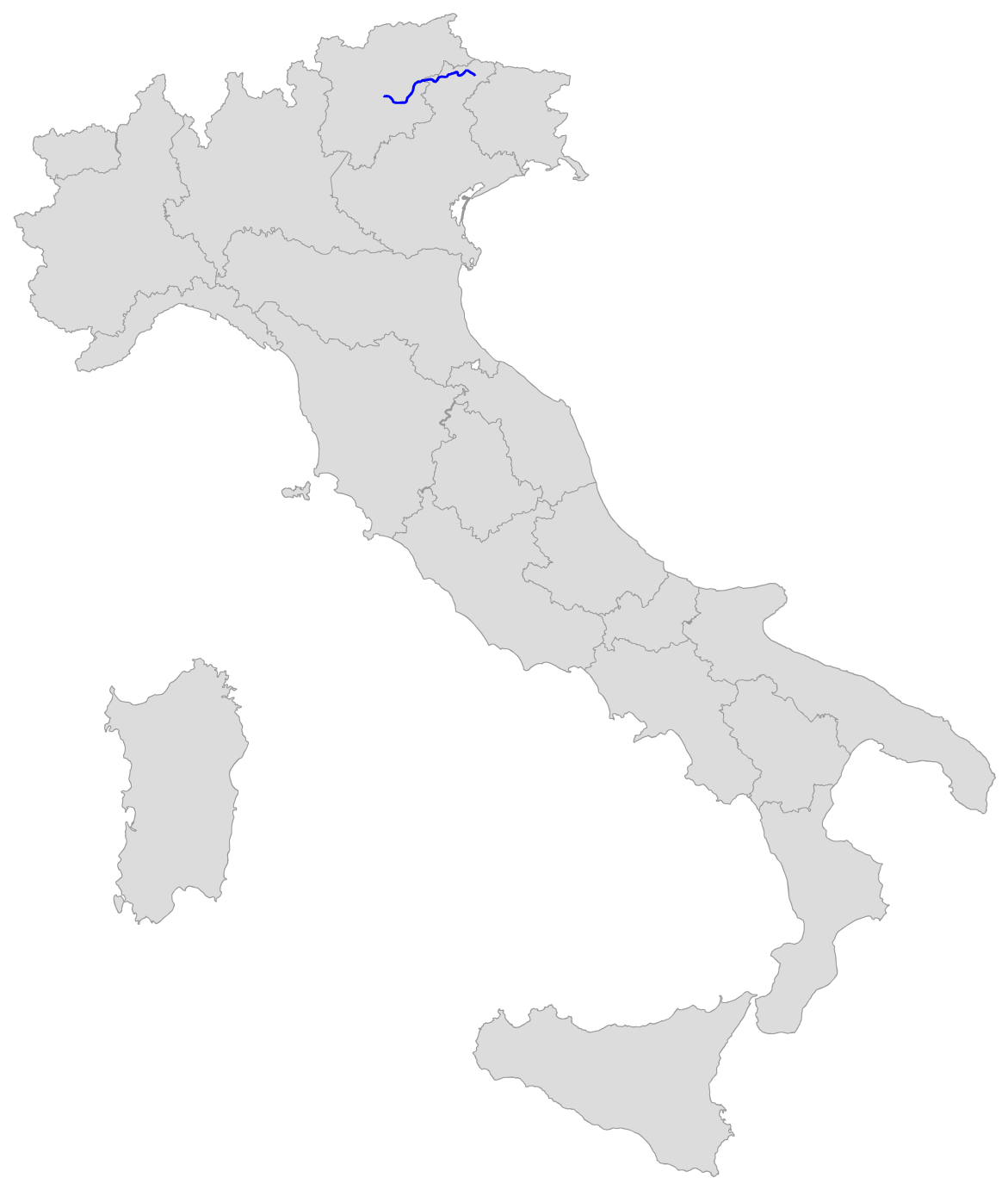

Route information
- Maintained by ANAS
- Length: 182.1 km (113.2 mi)
- Existed: 1928–present

Major junctions
- From: Auer
- To: Auronzo di Cadore

Location
- Country: Italy
- Regions: Trentino-Alto Adige/Südtirol, Veneto

Highway system
- Roads in Italy; Autostrade; State; Regional; Provincial; Municipal
| ← SS 47 | → SS 48 bis |

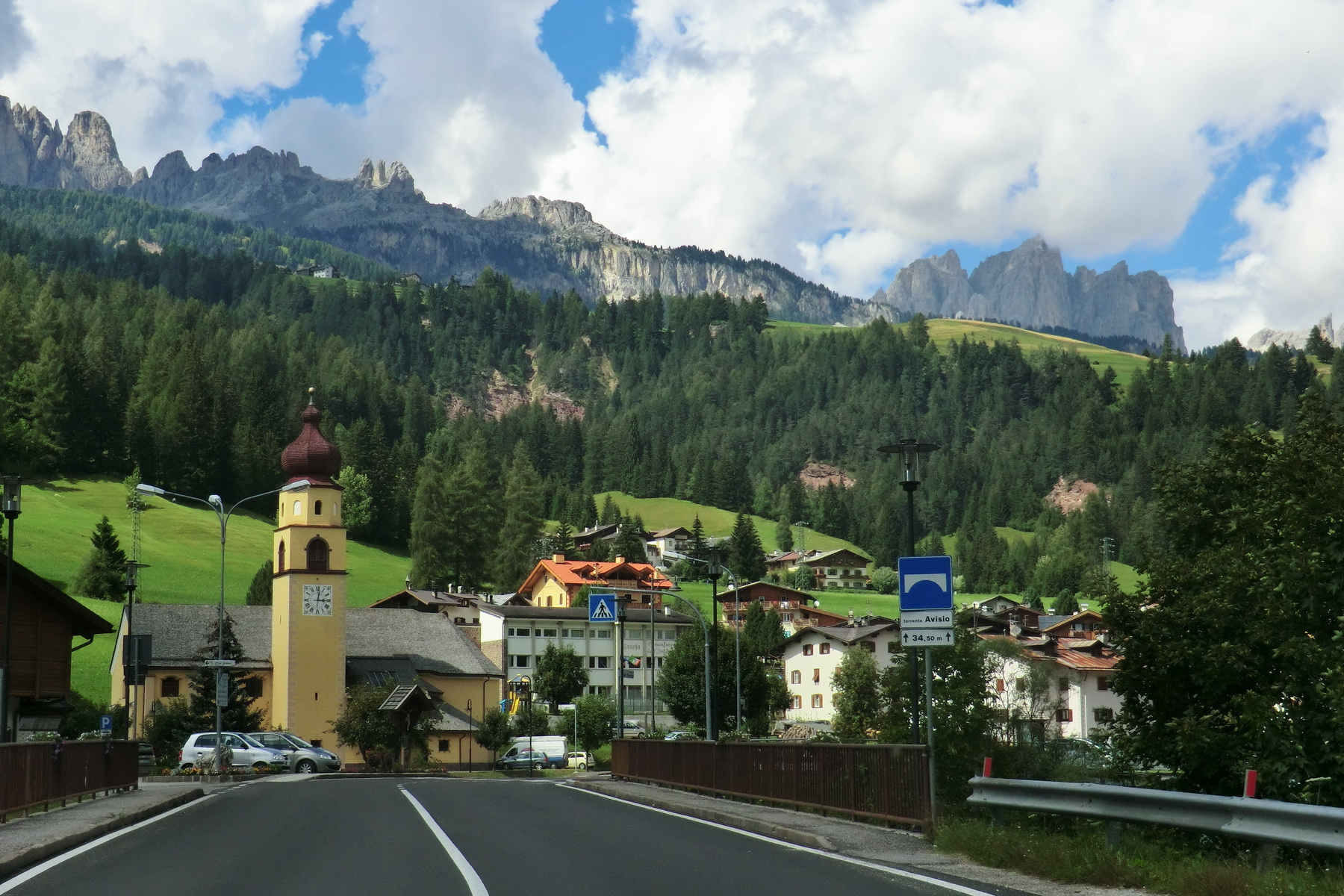
Strada statale 48 delle Dolomiti in Soraga

The strada statale 48 delle Dolomiti (SS 48), declassified as strada regionale 48 delle Dolomiti (SR 48) in Veneto is an Italian state highway 182.1 kilometres (113.2 mi) long in Italy located in the regions of Trentino-Alto Adige/Südtirol and Veneto. It is a mountainous road that runs through the Dolomites area from South Tyrol, through Trentino to Cadore (province of Belluno), crossing very suggestive mountain scenery.

== See also ==
- State highways (Italy)
- Roads in Italy
- Transport in Italy

=== Other Italian roads ===
- Autostrade of Italy
- Regional road (Italy)
- Provincial road (Italy)
- Municipal road (Italy)
