= Strada statale 70 della Consuma =

Former state highway in Italy

State Highway 70
- Strada statale 70
- della Consuma

Route information
- Maintained by ANAS
- Length: 39.4 km (24.5 mi)
- Existed: 1928–2000

Major junctions
- From: SS 69 in Pontassieve
- To: SS 71 in Bibbiena

Location
- Country: Italy
- Regions: Tuscany

Highway system
- Roads in Italy; Autostrade; State; Regional; Provincial; Municipal
← SS 69	→ SS 71

The strada statale 70 "della Consuma" (SS 70) was an Italian state highway 39.4 kilometres (24.5 mi) long in Italy in the region of Tuscany created in 1928 and disestablished in 2000. It began in Pontassieve and ended in Bibbiena.

== History ==
The road was created in 1928 with the following route: "Junction with the state road nr. 69 in Pontassieve – Passo della Consuma – Junction with the state road n. 71 in Bibbiena." The road was called "della Consuma", from the name of a pass in the Apennine Mountains.

In 1998 the government decided to devolve to the Regions all the state roads that were not considered of "national importance". The list of those roads, compiled in 2000, defined the state road nr. 70 of "regional interest", and therefore it was devolved to the Tuscany region.

== See also ==
- State highways (Italy)
- Roads in Italy
- Transport in Italy

=== Other Italian roads ===
- Autostrade of Italy
- Regional road (Italy)
- Provincial road (Italy)
- Municipal road (Italy)
