= Strada statale 35 dei Giovi =

State highway in Italy

State Highway 35
- Strada statale 35
- Giovi
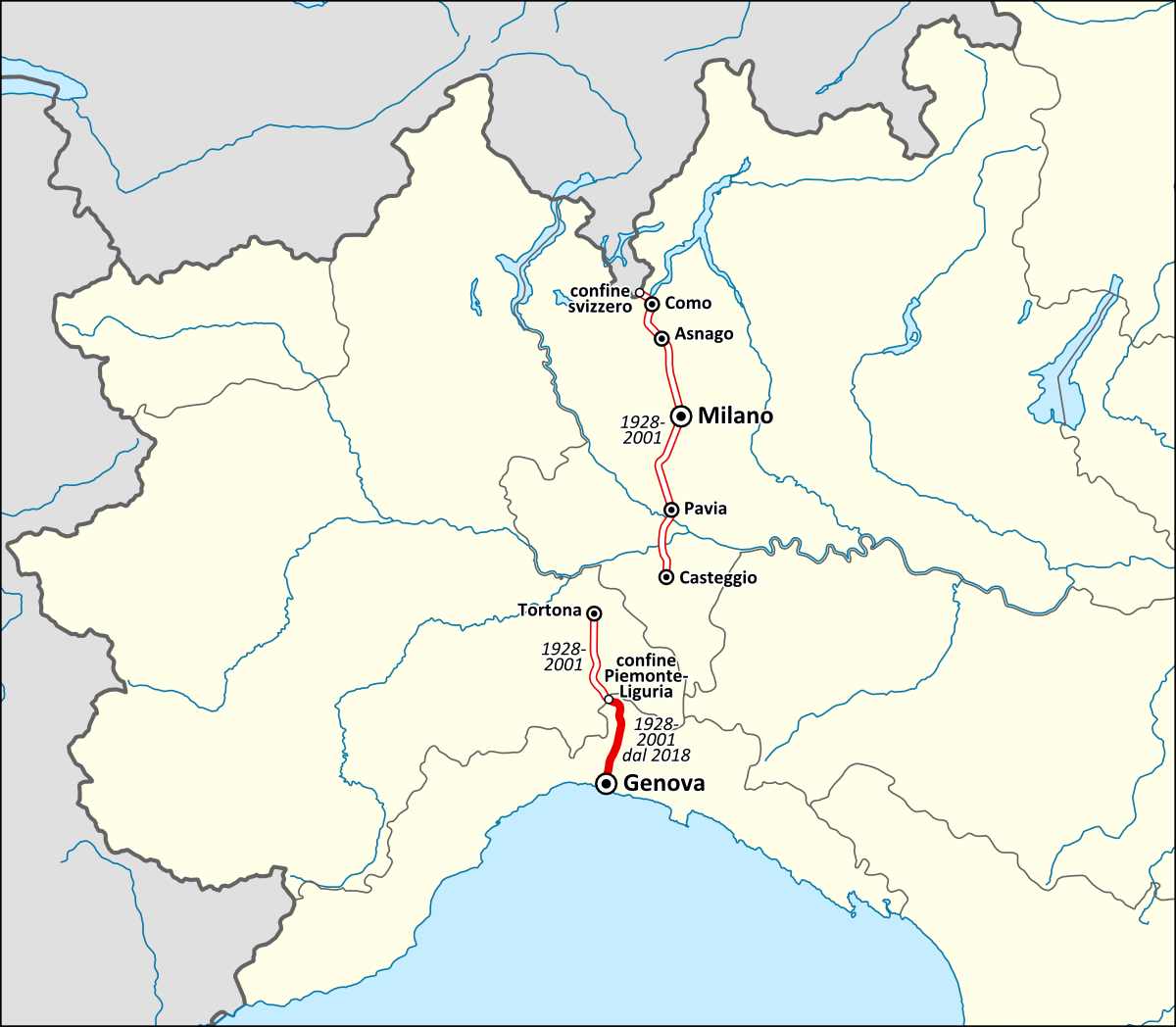

Route information
- Maintained by ANAS
- Length: 172.8 km (107.4 mi)
- Existed: 1928–present

Major junctions
- From: Genoa
- A4 at Cormano; A52 at Paderno Dugnano
- To: Como

Location
- Country: Italy
- Regions: Liguria, Piedmont, Lombardy

Highway system
- Roads in Italy; Autostrade; State; Regional; Provincial; Municipal
← SS 34	→ SS 36

Strada statale 35 dei Giovi is an Italian state highway 172.8 kilometres (107.4 mi) long in Italy located in the regions of Liguria, Piedmont and Lombardy, which connects Genoa and the Italian Riviera with Como and the Canton of Ticino, passing through Pavia and Milan. The road begins in Genoa in the Sampierdarena district where it constitutes an important urban crossing artery with the Reti and Fillak streets, and then ends in Como more precisely at the Customs House in Ponte Chiasso on the border with Switzerland. Between Tortona and Casteggio the SS 35 is in common with the strada statale 10, while the Milan-Cermenate section is a Superstrada, built around the 1960s known as Superstrada Milano-Meda.

== History ==
Strada statale 35 dei Giovi was established in 1928 with the following route: "From Genoa to Ronco Scrivia - Serravalle to Tortona, with a branch from Serravalle to Spinetta Marengo near Alessandria and from Casteggio to Pavia - Milan - Asnago - Como on the Swiss border towards Chiasso".

Following the legislative decree n. 112 of 1998, in 2001, the management passed from ANAS to the regional governments of Liguria, Piedmont and Lombardy Region, which have further devolved the competences to their respective provinces, as there is no regional road classification in these regions.

In 2018, the Ligurian section of the road was once again included in the road network of national interest, thus restoring its classification as a state road. In 2021, the same happened to the Piemontese section and a little section in Lombardy.

In the Milanese area, the road follows two historic arteries: in the northern section, in fact, the road already existed in the Middle Ages as the backbone of the communications of the Duchy of Milan, where it was known as the Dergano road, which in modern times became the Comasina.

== Route ==
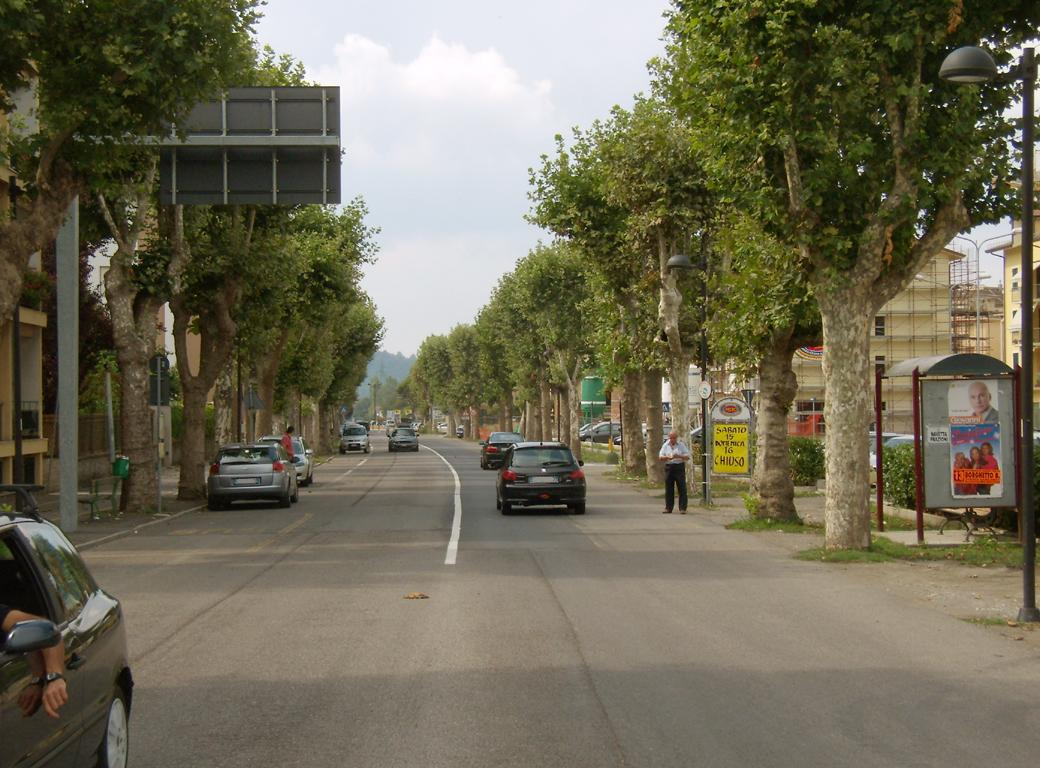
Strada statale 35 dei Giovi in Arquata Scrivia

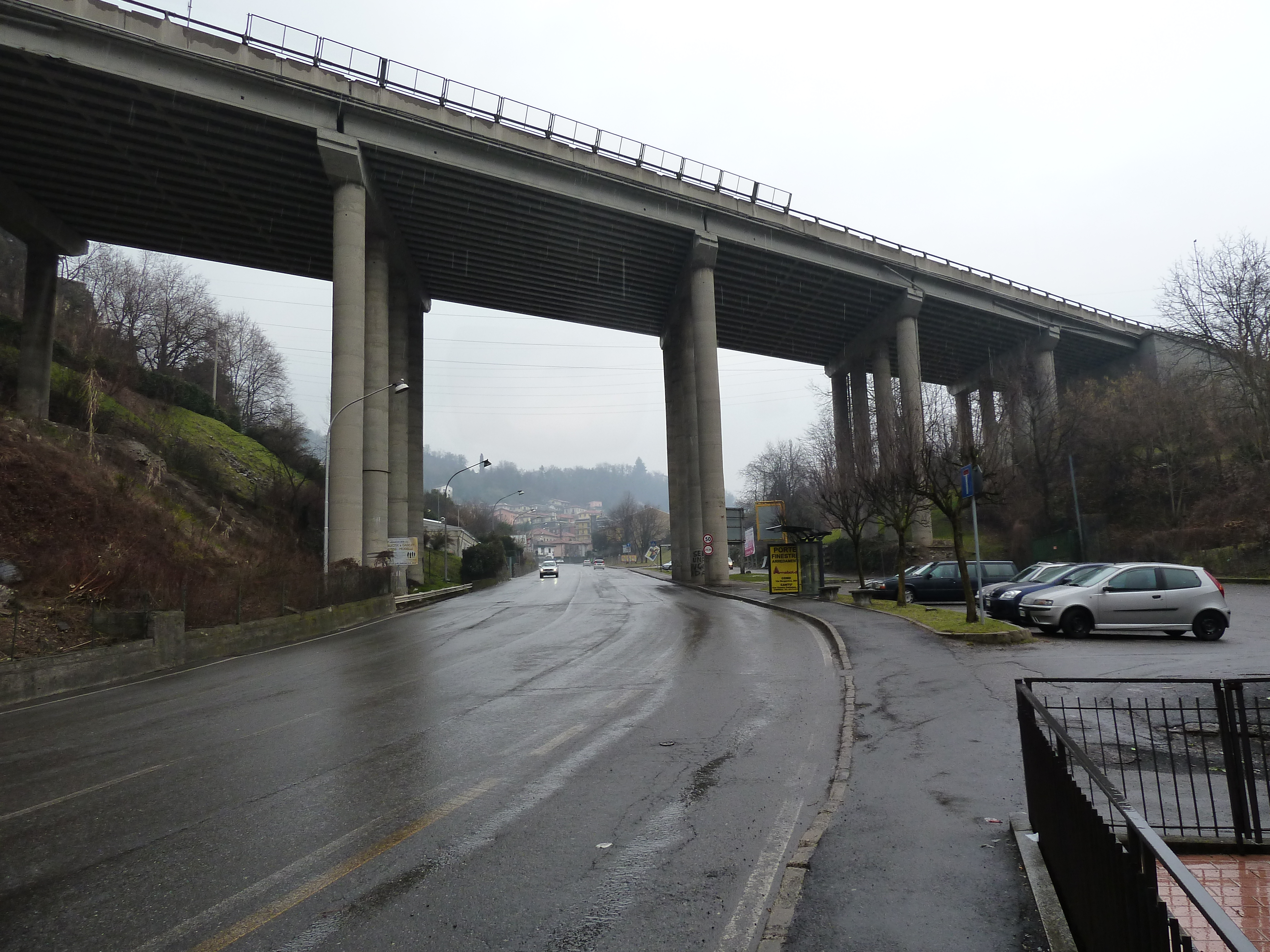
Strada statale 35 dei Giovi in Como

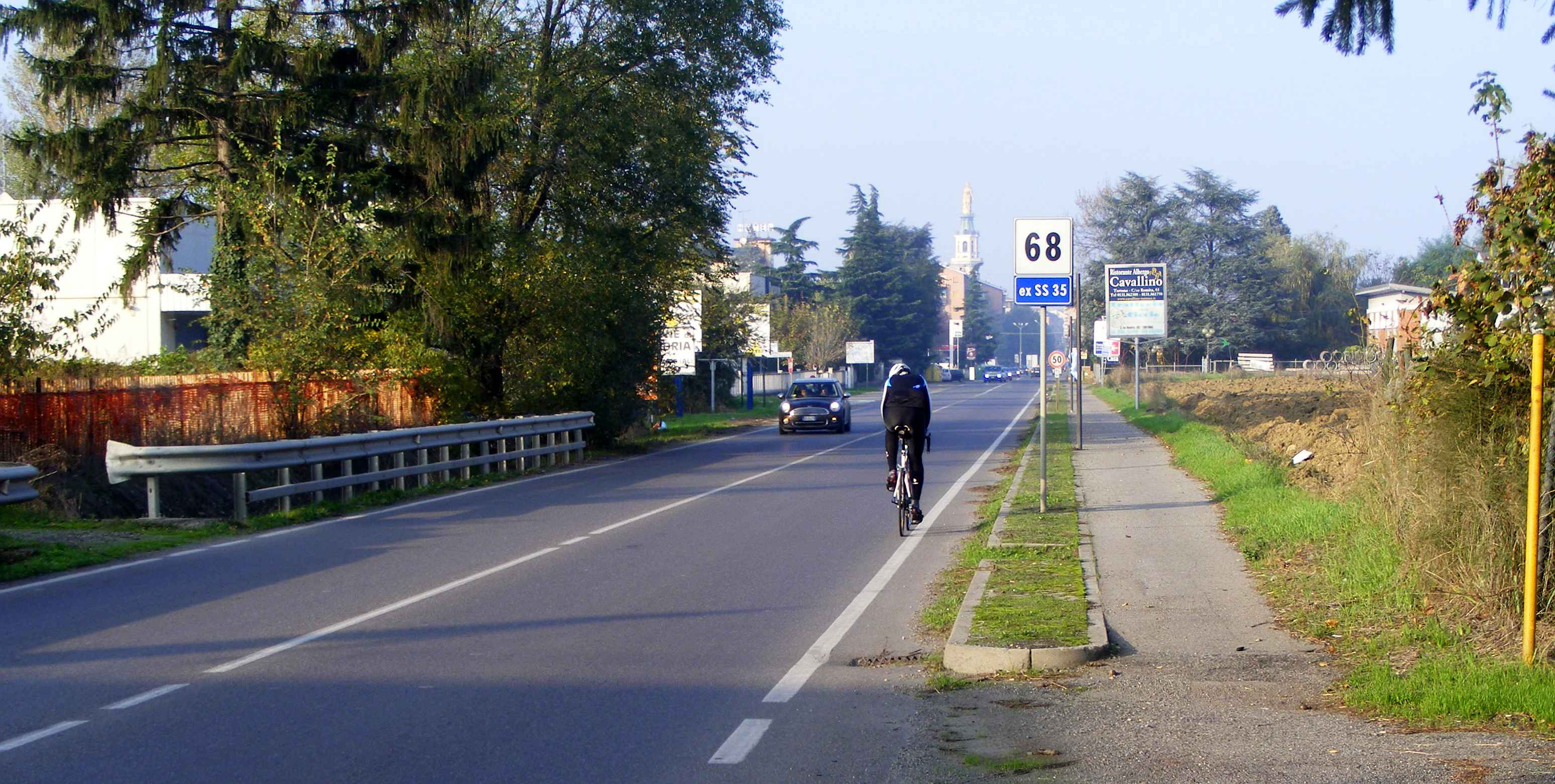
Strada statale 35 dei Giovi in Tortona

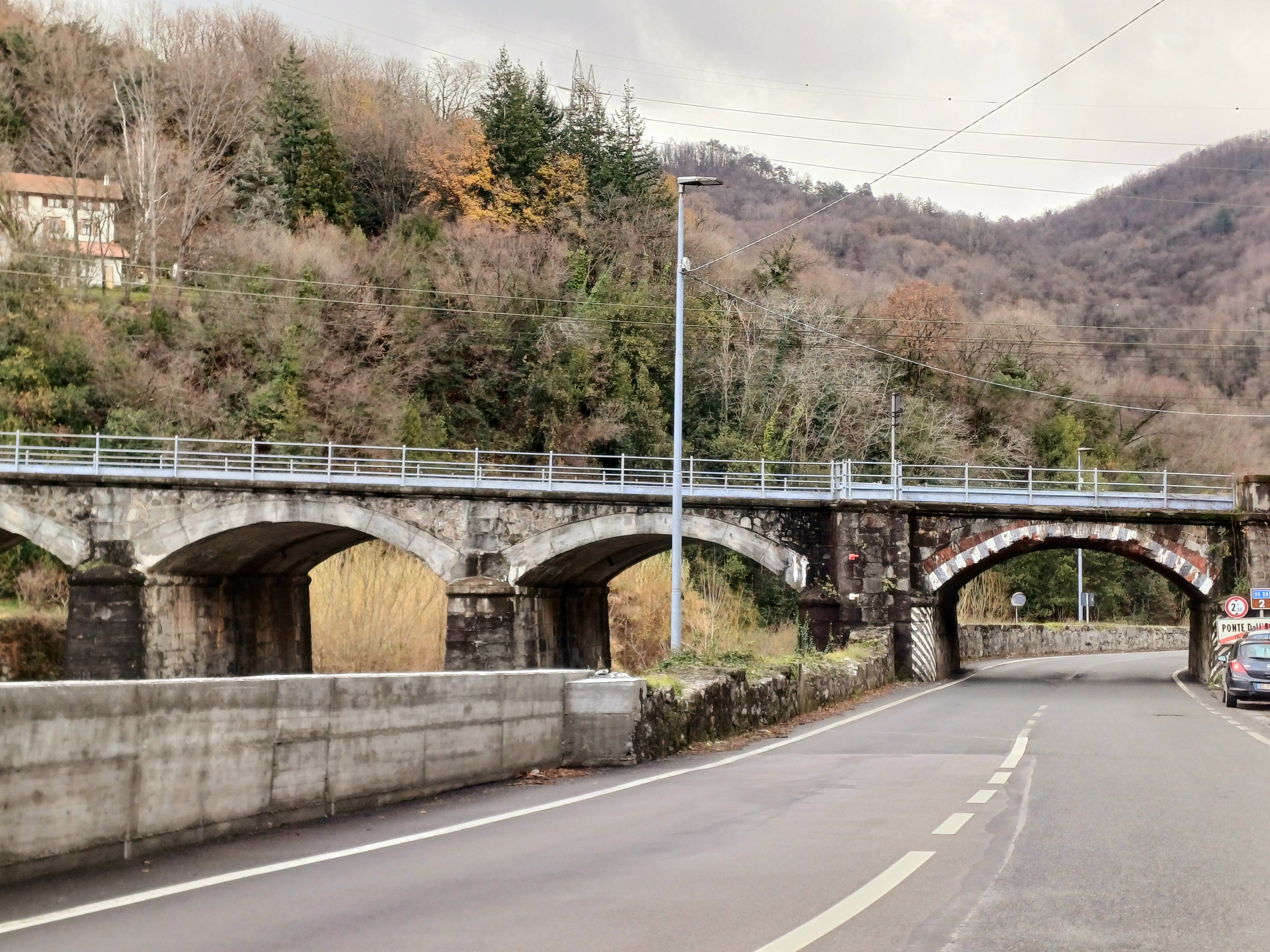
Strada statale 35 dei Giovi in Mignanego

dei Giovi
Exit	↓km↓	Province
Milano Viale Enrico Fermi, Viale Rubicone	127.0 km (78.9 mi)	MI
Affori - Bruzzano Comasina	127.5 km (79.2 mi)	MI
Cormano - Bresso; A4 Torino-Venezia	128.5 km (79.8 mi)	MI
Cormano - Cusano Milanino	130.5 km (81.1 mi)	MI
Cormano - Bollate - Rho; Paderno Dugnano	131.5 km (81.7 mi)	MI
Tangenziale Nord	132.5 km (82.3 mi)	MI
Paderno Dugnano	133.5 km (83.0 mi)	MI
Incirano - Nova Milanese	134.5 km (83.6 mi)	MI
Palazzolo Milanese	135.0 km (83.9 mi)	MI
Varedo; Monza-Saronno	136.5 km (84.8 mi)	MB
Bovisio Masciago - Desio	138.5 km (86.1 mi)	MB
Binzago	139.5 km (86.7 mi)	MB
Cesano Maderno centro	140.0 km (87.0 mi)	MB
Seveso-Cesano Maderno nord	141.0 km (87.6 mi)	MB
Meda	143.0 km (88.9 mi)	MB
Barlassina	145.0 km (90.1 mi)	MB
Lentate sul Seveso sud	145.5 km (90.4 mi)	MB
A36 Autostrada Pedemontana	149.0 km (92.6 mi)	MB
Lentate sul Seveso nord	150.5 km (93.5 mi)	MB
Cermenate - Como	150.6 km (93.6 mi)	CO

== See also ==
- State highways (Italy)
- Roads in Italy
- Transport in Italy

=== Other Italian roads ===
- Autostrade of Italy
- Regional road (Italy)
- Provincial road (Italy)
- Municipal road (Italy)
