= State highway (Italy) =

State highway system of Italy

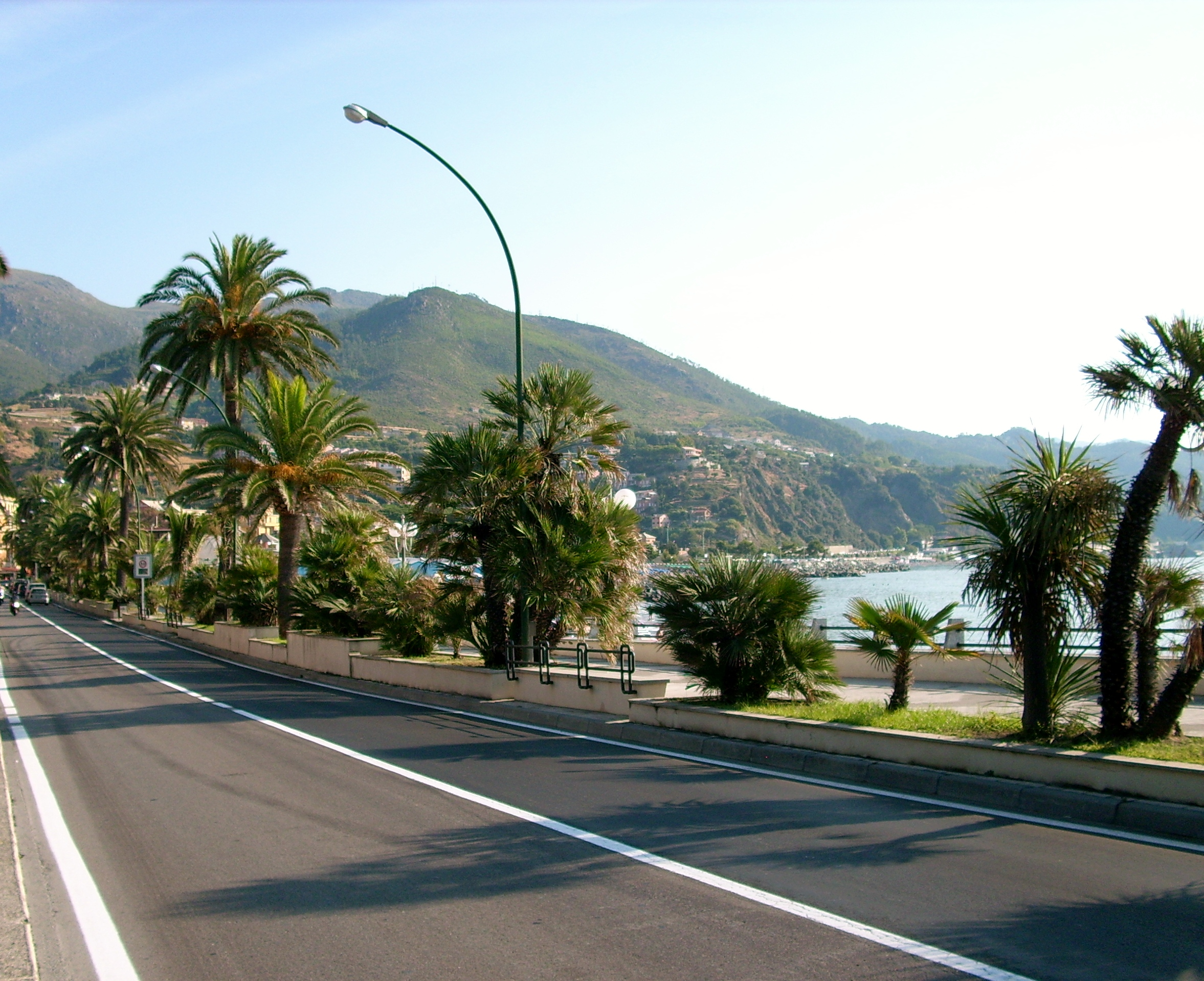
Strada statale 1 Via Aurelia

The Strade Statali (Italian: [ˈstraːde staˈtaːli]; sing. Strada Statale [ˈstraːda staˈtaːle]), abbreviated SS, are the Italian national network of state highways. The total length of the network is about 25,000 km (16,000 mi).

The Italian state highway network is maintained by ANAS. From 1928 until 1946, state highways were maintained by the Azienda Autonoma Statale della Strada (AASS).

The routes of some Italian state highways derive from ancient Roman roads, such as the Strada statale 7 Via Appia, which broadly follows the route of the Appian Way. Other examples are the Strada statale 1 Via Aurelia (Via Aurelia) and the Strada statale 4 Via Salaria (Via Salaria).

== History ==
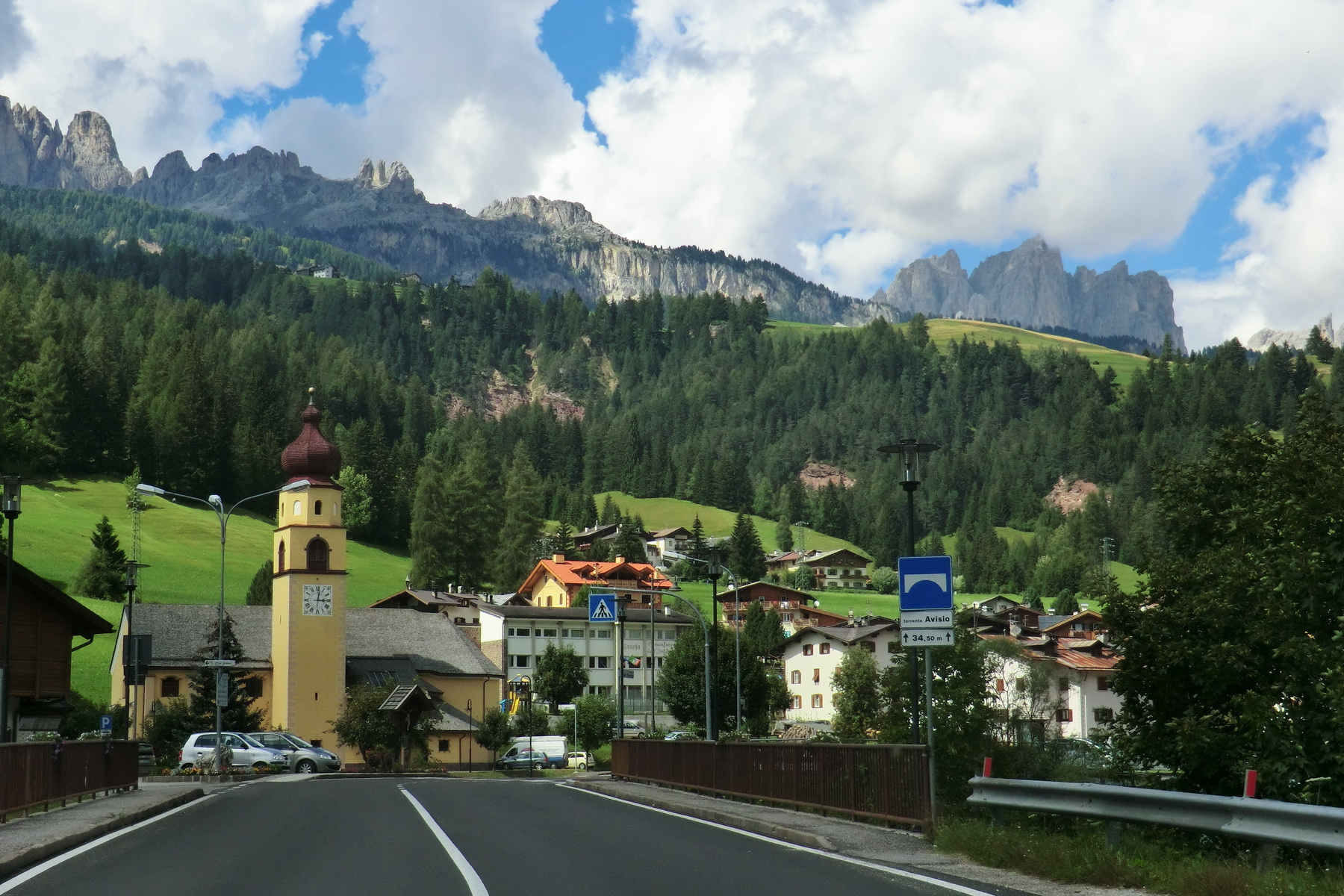
Strada statale 48 delle Dolomiti

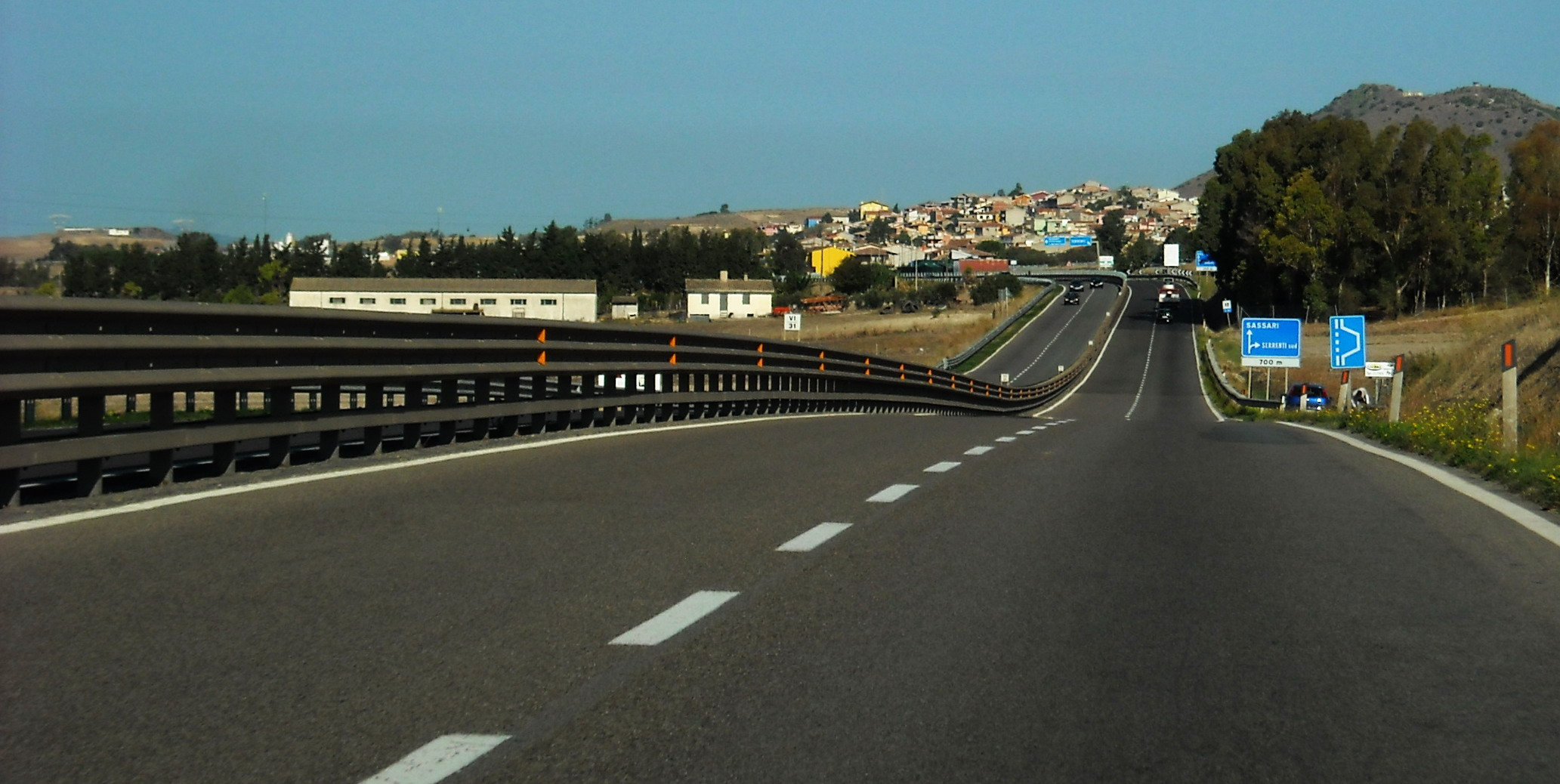
Strada statale 131 Carlo Felice

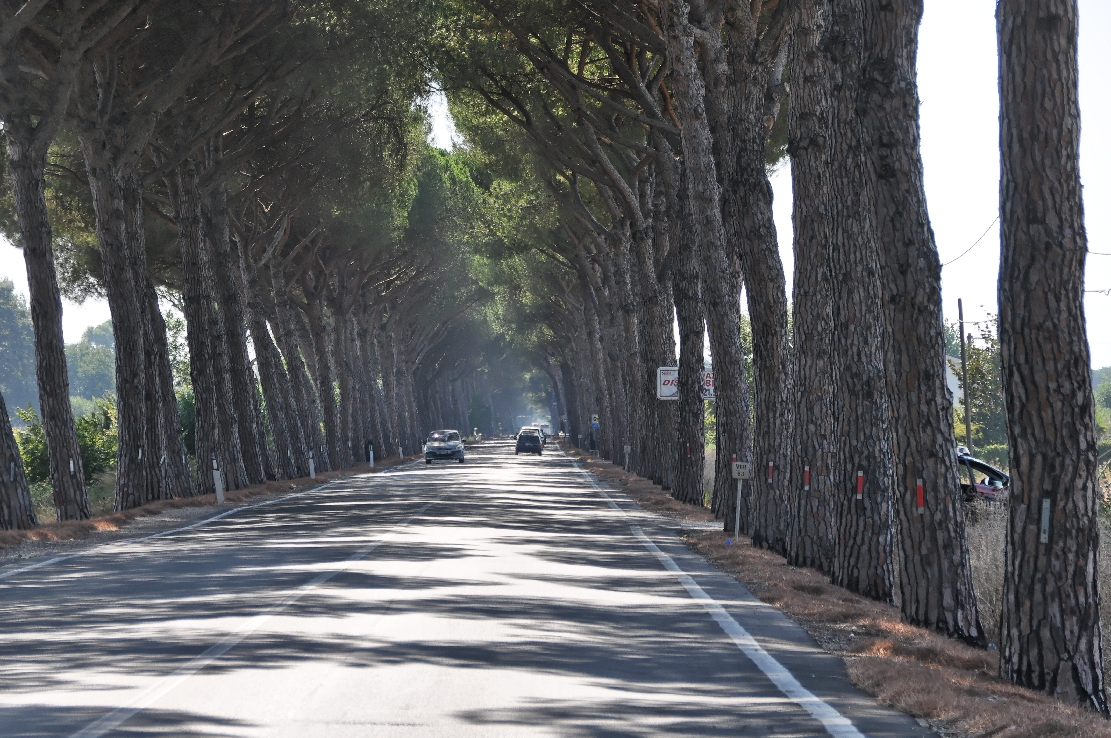
Strada statale 7 Via Appia

Since the reforms following the birth of the Kingdom of Italy in 1861, the State took charge of the construction and maintenance of a primary network of roads for connections between the main cities; in 1865 the Lanza law introduced the classification of roads as national, provincial or municipal (see Annex F, art.10) and the Royal Decree of 17 November 1865, n. 2633 listed the first 38 national roads.

Following the works to extend the road network, the first revision of the list took place in 1884 with Royal Decree no. 2197 which now listed 90 national roads.

In the following decades the State significantly invested in the construction of roads, particularly in the Southern regions, but these roads were progressively delegated to the provinces, causing a reduction of the extension of the national road network and a strong increase of the provincial road network. Furthermore, the road network was considered complementary to the railway network, on which long-distance traffic travelled, and for a long time there was a ban on classifying roads on routes already served by the railway as national roads.

The extension of the road network was necessary in 1911 to update the list drawn up almost 30 years earlier, formalized with Royal Decree no. 221 which now included 84 national roads. The advent of the automobile, which required the availability of fast and well-paved roads, changed the situation, and in the immediate post-war period it was decided to revisit the issue. Two opposing theories faced each other, linked to the expansion desires of competing public bodies. The provinces were pushing to receive management of all the remaining national roads, while the engineers proposed a reinvestment in a network of roads directly managed by the state.

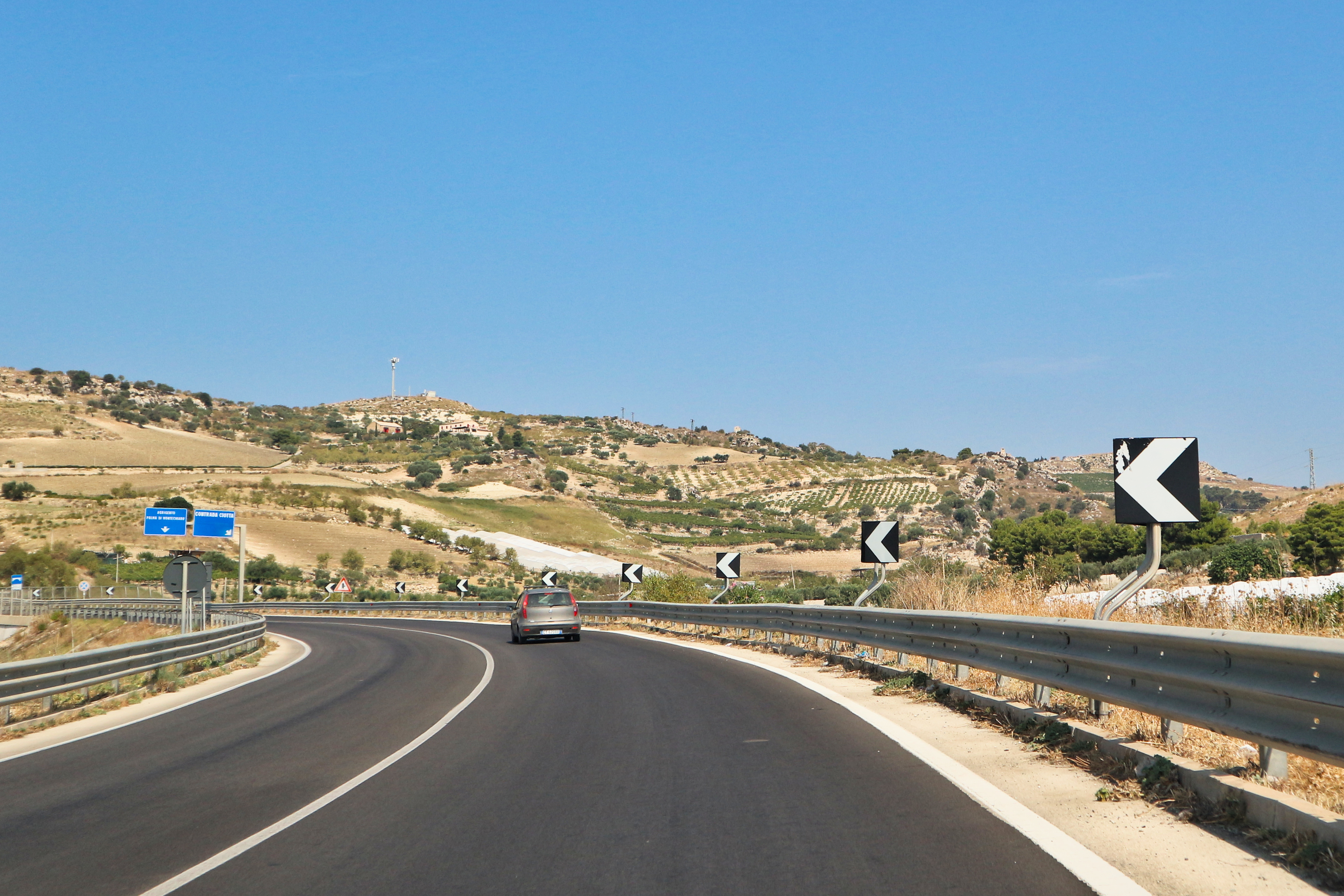
Strada statale 115 Sud Occidentale Sicula

A first step was taken with Royal Decree no. 2056 of 15 November 1923, which further reorganized the classification of roads. The list of 118 roads began with the national road 1 Padana Superiore and ended with the national road 118 in Sardinia. The ban on overlapping with railway routes also fell, giving rise to the progressive replacement of rail transport with road transport.

However, the 1923 reform did not resolve the issue of competences, and was in fact not implemented. The growing centralization of power of the fascist regime however led to the definitive affirmation of the centralist management model, which culminated in 1928 with the foundation of the Azienda Autonoma Statale della Strada (AASS) (law 17 May 1928, n. 1094, Official Gazette n. 127 of 05/31/1928); it then became ANAS in 1946.

With the establishment of the AASS, for the first time there was a body that dealt exclusively with the state's highways; at the same time, 137 state highways were established, mostly taking up and renumbering the 118 roads of the previous decree, from SS 1 (Via Aurelia) to SS 137 (in the province of Zara, Dalmatia, in present-day Croatia). This numbering is still in use, except for modifications due to changes in route or national borders.

For these first numbered roads, they always began and ended in city centers (the numbers of the state highways starting from Milan begins in Piazza Duomo), following the ancient routes. Seven of these roads were ceded to Yugoslavia under the Treaty of Paris between Italy and the Allied Powers in 1947.

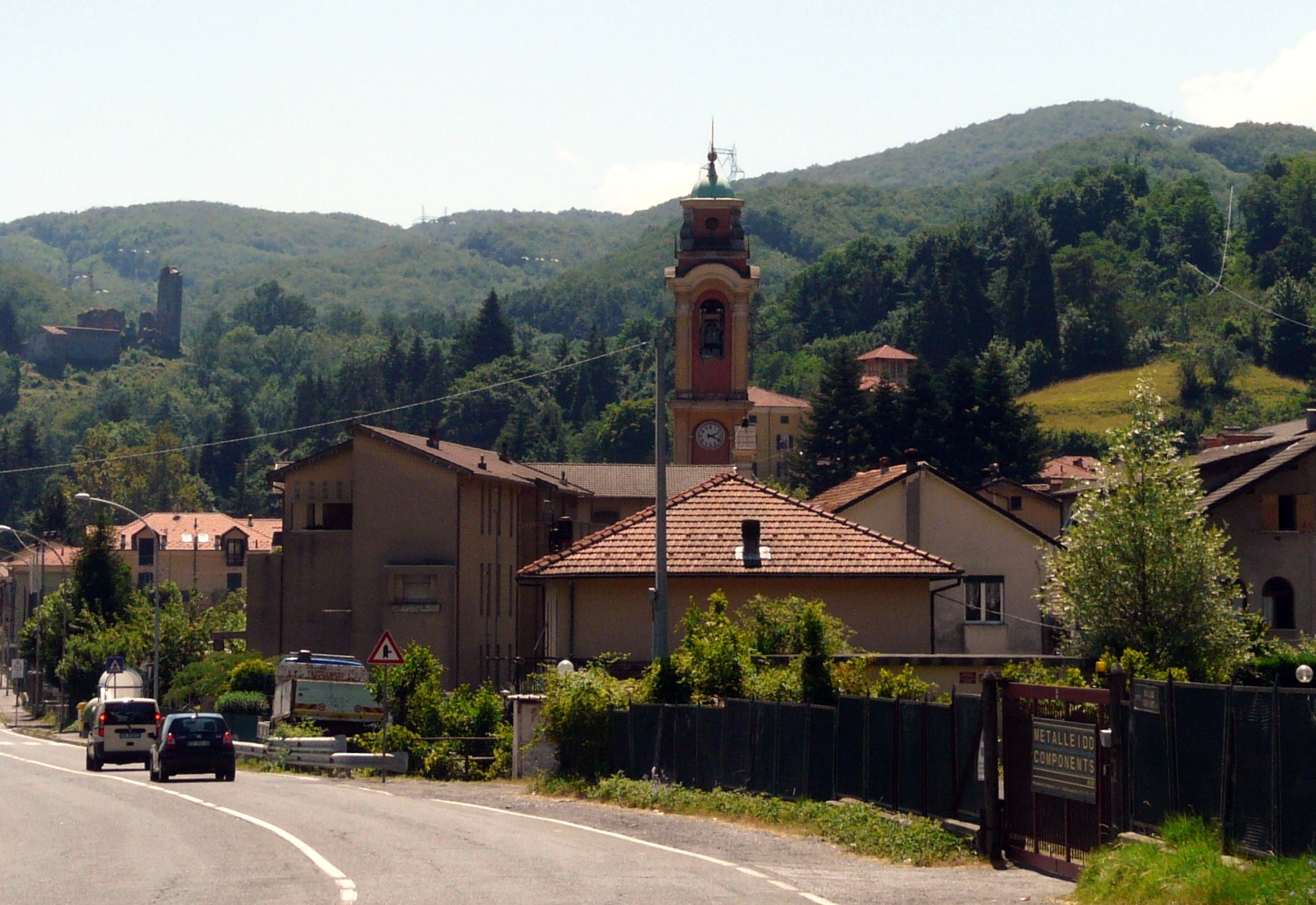
Strada statale 35 dei Giovi

In 1942, with the annexation of new territories (the areas constituting the province of Ljubljana, the area merged with the province of Fiume and the areas making up the Governorate of Dalmatia), two new roads were classified in the province of Cattaro (SS 138 and SS 139), in addition to the extension of the network in the province of Ljubljana (SS 56, SS 57 bis, SS 58 with branches, SS 58 bis and SS 58 ter), in the province of Fiume (SS 14 and SS 14 bis), and in the province of Zara and in the province of Spalato (SS 135, SS 136 and SS 137 with branches). These roads were also ceded to Yugoslavia with the Treaty of Paris in 1947.

On the basis of law 126 of 1958 on public roads, the State began to classify many others, even of lesser importance, guaranteeing investments and maintenance at the expense of the State in every corner of Italy; to date, the numbering of state highways has exceeded 750. For these latter roads, the numbered roads were made to begin at the end of the town from which they started.

Starting from the mid-1960s, ANAS also began to build a network of dual carriageways which often flanked or completed the routes of the state highways, but did not formally replace them. These roads, initially called in the most disparate ways, were subsequently cataloged under the name of new road ANAS (NSA), also followed by a progressive number. Over time, many of the new ANAS roads were then reclassified as state highways, either as a new route of an existing state highway, or as a new state highway in its own right with a new number.

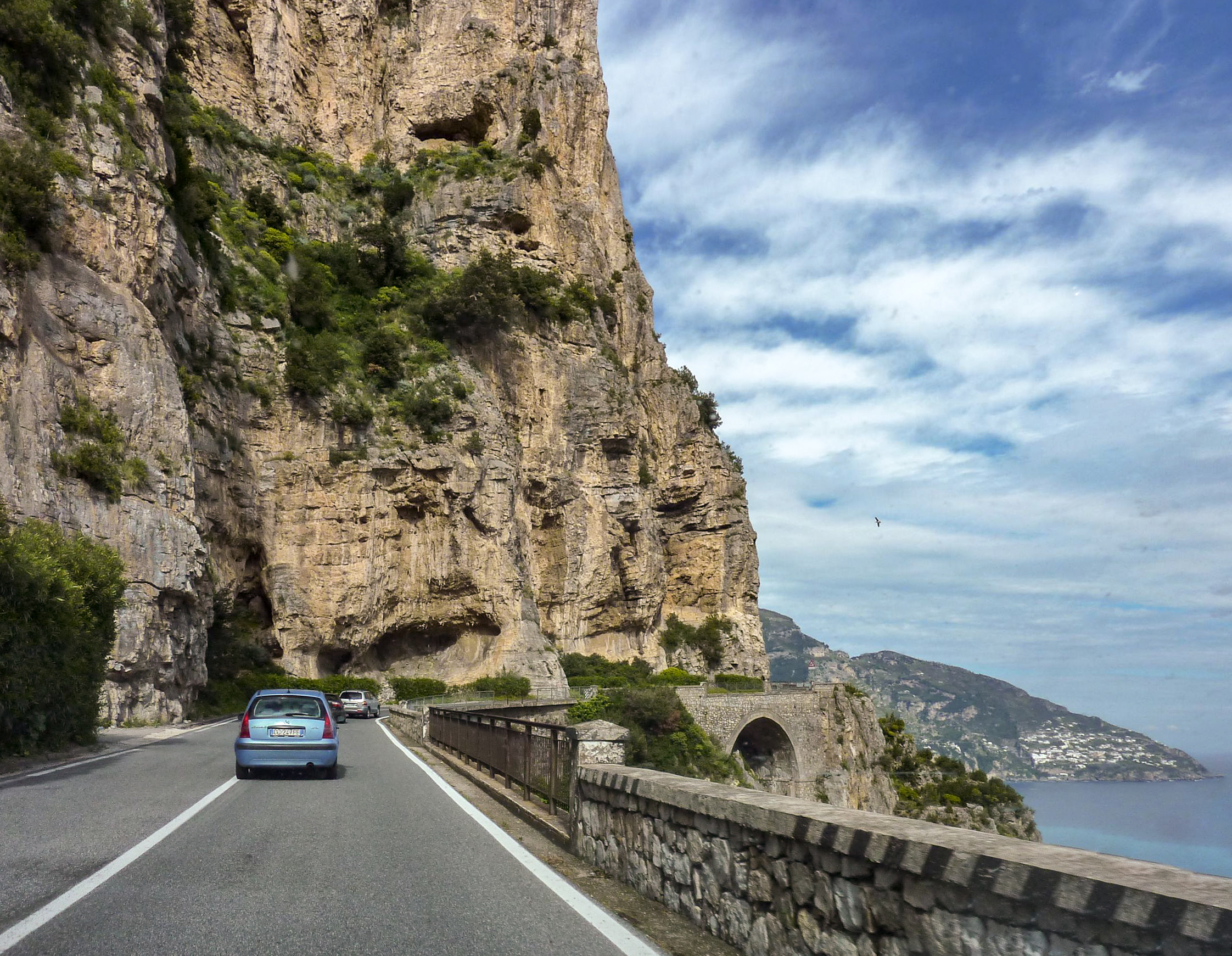
Strada statale 163 Amalfitana

In 2001, as a consequence of the autonomist reforms of the late 1990s, many state highways were handed over to the regions, and from them to the provinces; the State kept for itself only a skeleton of fundamental roads, as well as those leading to the main border posts with other States. From a classification point of view, this has led to an extreme and confusing variety of new acronyms and street numbers, carried out independently by each local authority without a common criterion; consequently, in common usage the roads have often continued to be identified as "former state highway number...".

Since 2018, faced with the difficulty of many local authorities in guaranteeing the maintenance of former state highways, a "road return" project was launched which involves the return of almost 7,000 km of roads to ANAS, staggered in two phases. Consequently, these roads have once again assumed the pre-existing state highway numbering already removed in 2001.

== Nomenclature ==
Italian state highways are identified by a number and a name. In road signs and maps the number is preceded by the acronym SS, an acronym for strada statale ("state road"). The nomenclature of the state highways managed by ANAS generally follows the SS n scheme, where n is a number ranging from 1 (Aurelia) up to 700 (of the Royal Palace of Caserta) depending on the date of establishment of the state highway. Newly built ANAS roads, not yet classified, are identified by the acronym NSA, an acronym for nuova strada ANAS ("new ANAS road"). In road signs the alphanumeric acronym is enclosed in a blue rectangle with a white acronym.

== General information ==
Road sign in use since 1992

Road sign in use from 1979 to 1992

Road sign in use from 1959 to 1979

State highway classification is an administrative classification. The Italian traffic code defines roads as such that:

- they constitute the major routes of national traffic;
- they connect the main road network of the State with those of neighboring States;
- they connect regional capitals or provincial capitals located in different regions, or constitute direct and important connections between state highways;
- they connect sea ports, airports and centers of particular industrial, tourist and climatic importance to the state highway network;
- they serve interregional traffic or are of particular interest for the economy of vast areas of the national territory.

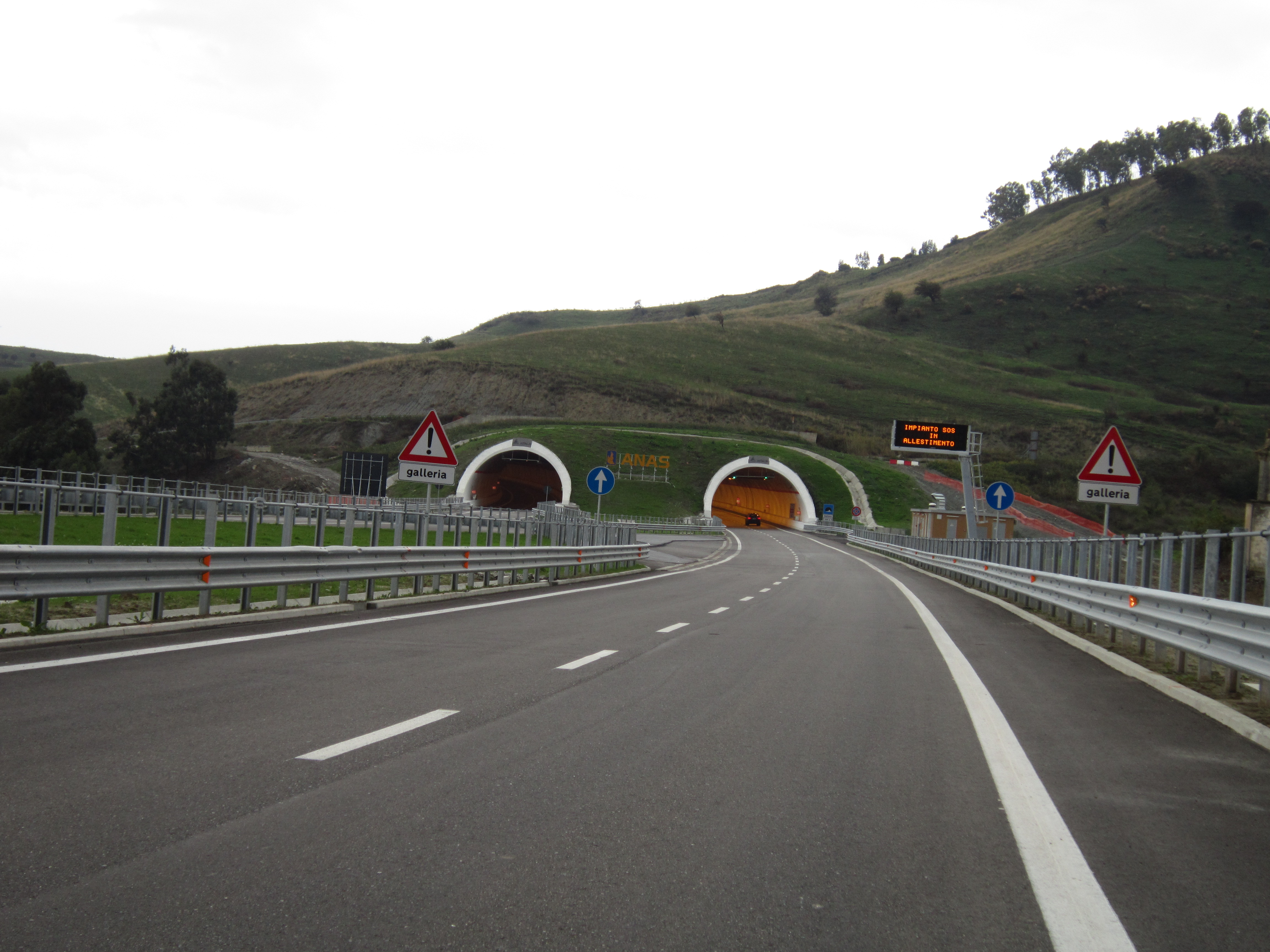
Strada statale 106 Jonica

State highways can be technically defined as main extra-urban roads (type B road) or as secondary extra-urban roads (type C road). State highways that cross towns with a population of at least 10,000 inhabitants are urban roads (type D and E) under the jurisdiction of the relevant comuni. The state highway that cross towns or villages with a population of less than 10,000 inhabitants are urban roads (type D and E) under the jurisdiction of the comune, subject to authorization from ANAS.

The routes of some state highways derive from ancient Roman roads, such as the Strada statale 7 Via Appia, which broadly follows the route of the Roman road of the same name.

The roads identified by the acronym NSA are also state highway as they are managed by ANAS.

== Types of highway ==
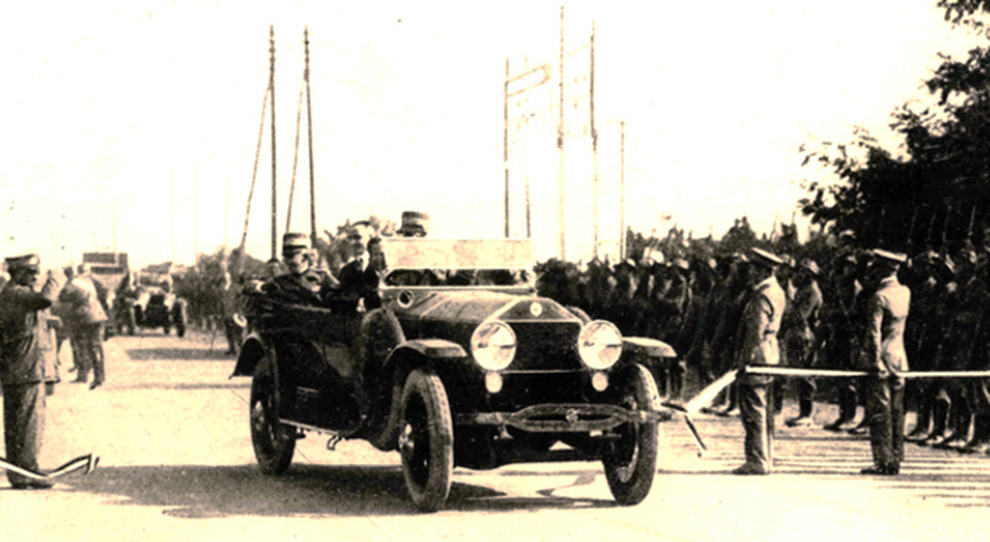
The King Victor Emmanuel III of Italy inaugurated the Autostrada dei Laghi ('Lakes Motorway'; now parts of the Autostrada A8 and Autostrada A9), the first motorway built in the world, on 21 September 1924, aboard the royal Lancia Trikappa

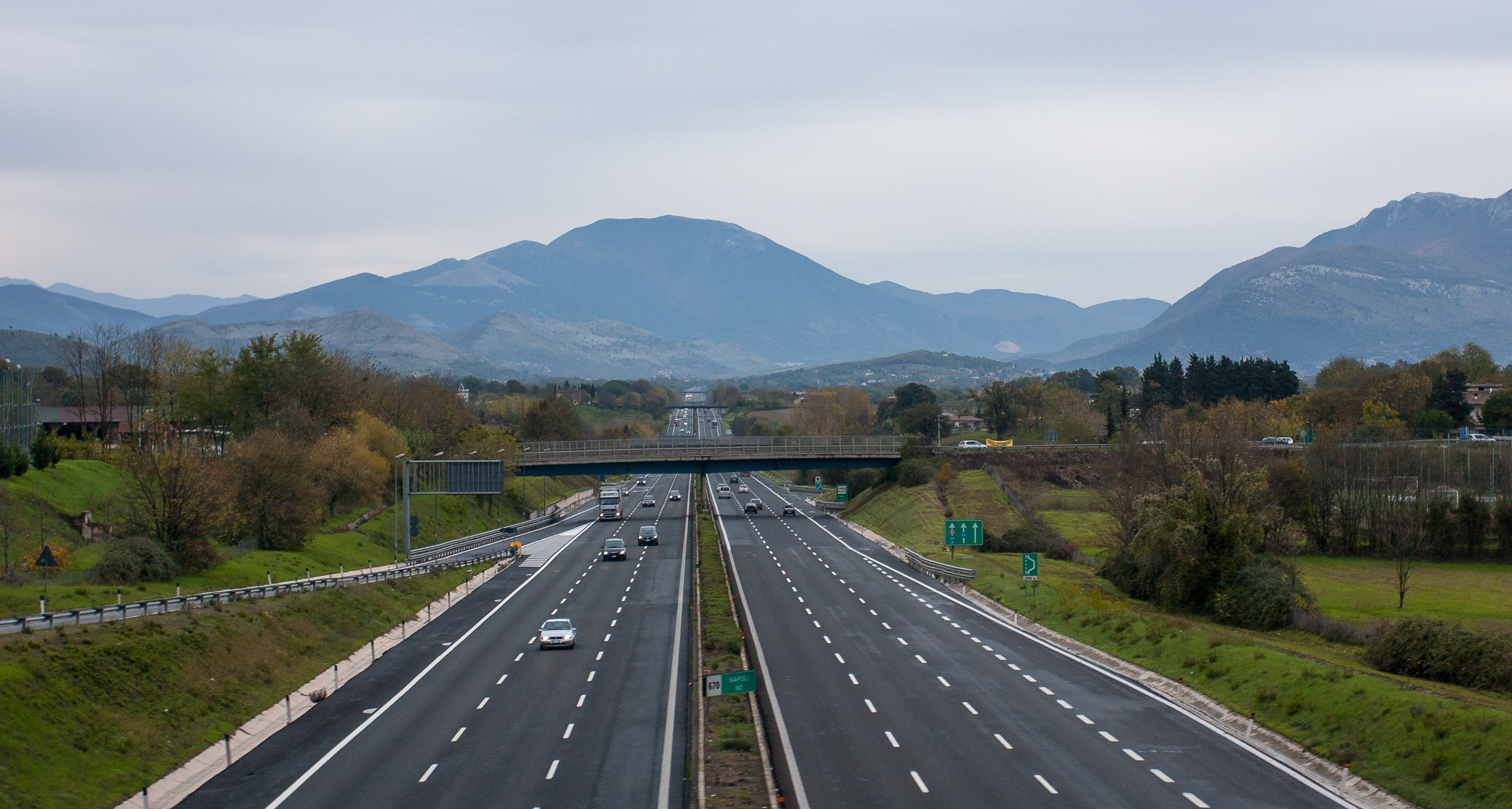
Autostrada A1 runs through Italy linking some of the largest cities of the country: Milan, Bologna, Florence, Rome and Naples

Nowadays, a state highway can be classified in more types, except Type A highway, which is reserved to motorways, called autostrade. The same types also are used for regional roads, provincial roads and municipal roads.

Italy was the first country in the world to build motorways reserved for fast traffic and for motor vehicles only. The Autostrada dei Laghi ("Lakes Motorway"), the first built in the world, connecting Milan to Lake Como and Lake Maggiore, and now parts of the Autostrada A8 and the Autostrada A9, was devised by Piero Puricelli and was inaugurated in 1924.

=== Type B ===
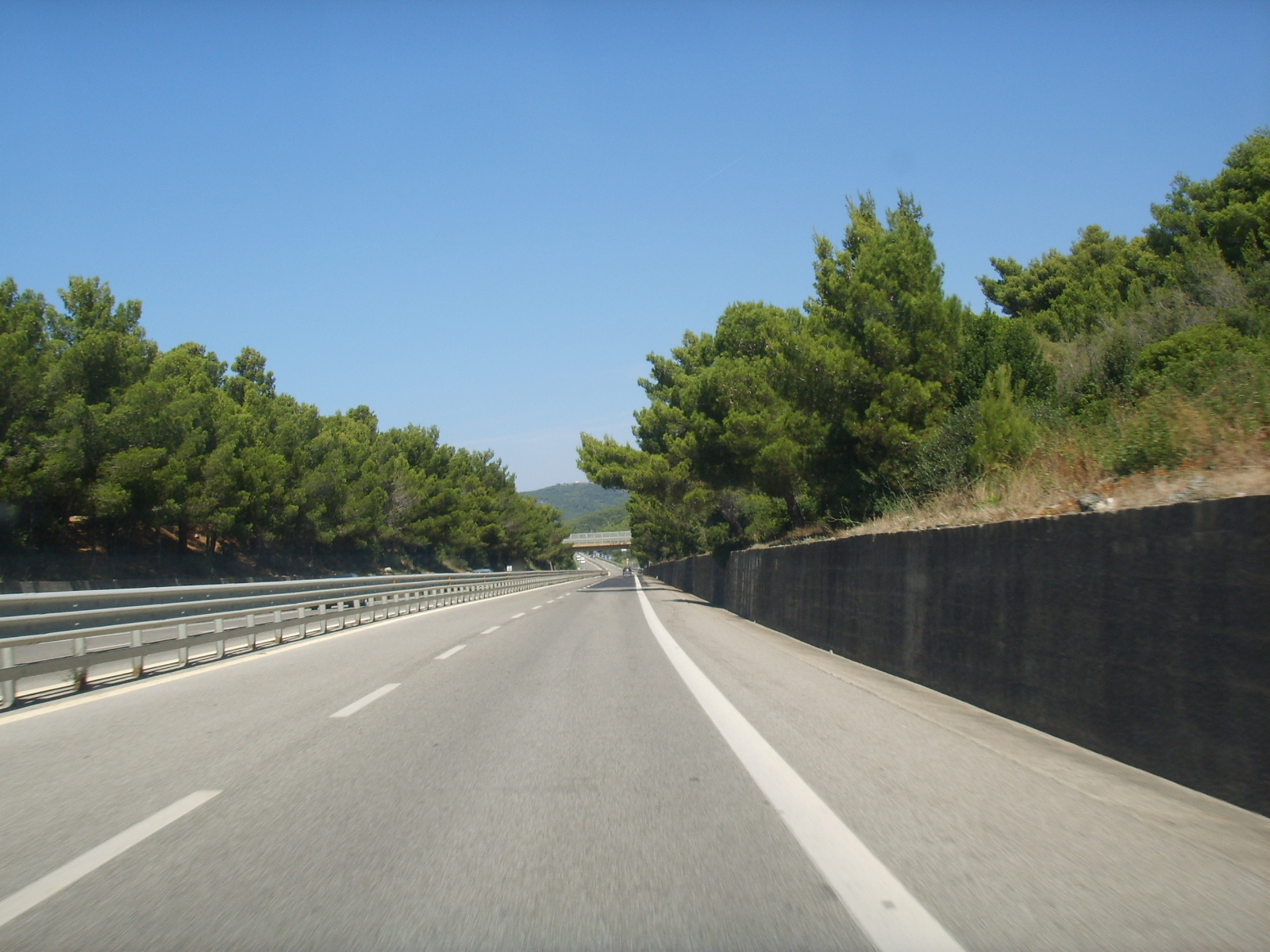
The stretch from Grosseto to Livorno of the Strada statale 1 Via Aurelia is classified as strada extraurbana principale.

Type B highway is a dual carriageway with at least two lanes for each direction, paved shoulder on the right, no cross-traffic and no at-grade intersections. In Italy are called strade extraurbane principali. Beginning of Type B highway is marked by a traffic sign.

Speed limit in Type B highways is 110 km/h (68 mph).

=== Type C ===
Type C highway is a single carriageway road. In Italy are called strade extraurbane secondarie.

Speed limit in Type C highways is 90 km/h (56 mph).

=== Type D ===
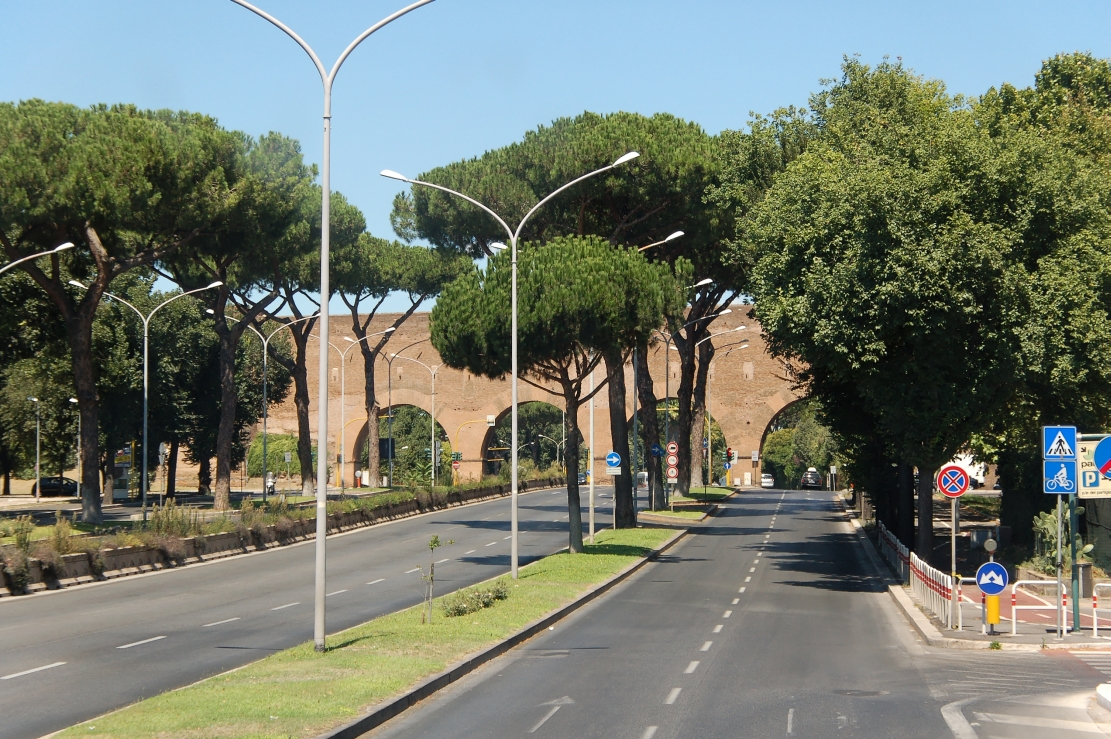
Via Cristoforo Colombo at Porta Ardeatina in Rome, classified as strada urbana di scorrimento.

Type D highway is a dual carriageway urban road with sidewalk. In Italy are called strade urbane di scorrimento.

If Type D highway travels across an urban area with more than 10,000 people, it is maintained by comuni, instead of ANAS.

Speed limit in Type D highways is 70 km/h (43 mph).

=== Type E ===
Type E highway is a single carriageway urban road with sidewalk. In Italy are called strade urbane di quartiere.

If Type E highway travels across an urban area with more than 10,000 people, it is maintained by comuni, instead of ANAS.

Speed limit in Type E highways is 50 km/h (31 mph).

=== Type F ===
Type F highway is a road, which it cannot be classified as Type B, Type C, Type D and Type E. In Italy are called strade locali.

An example of Type F highway is an urban road without sidewalk.

If Type F highway travels across an urban area with more than 10,000 people, it is maintained by comuni, instead of ANAS.

Speed limit in Type F highways is 90 km/h (56 mph). If Type F highway is an urban road, speed limit is 50 km/h (31 mph).

== Extent and management ==
The Italian state highway network has approximately 25,000 km (16,000 mi) of roads identified with the acronym SS. The body that manages these roads, with full state participation, is ANAS (National Autonomous Roads Company), founded in 1946, on the ashes of the old AASS (Autonomous State Roads Company) which in turn was established in 1928. Due to urbanization processes, it has abandoned some sections of state highways, following their acquisition by the interested comuni, who now take care of their maintenance.

== Downgrading of state highways ==
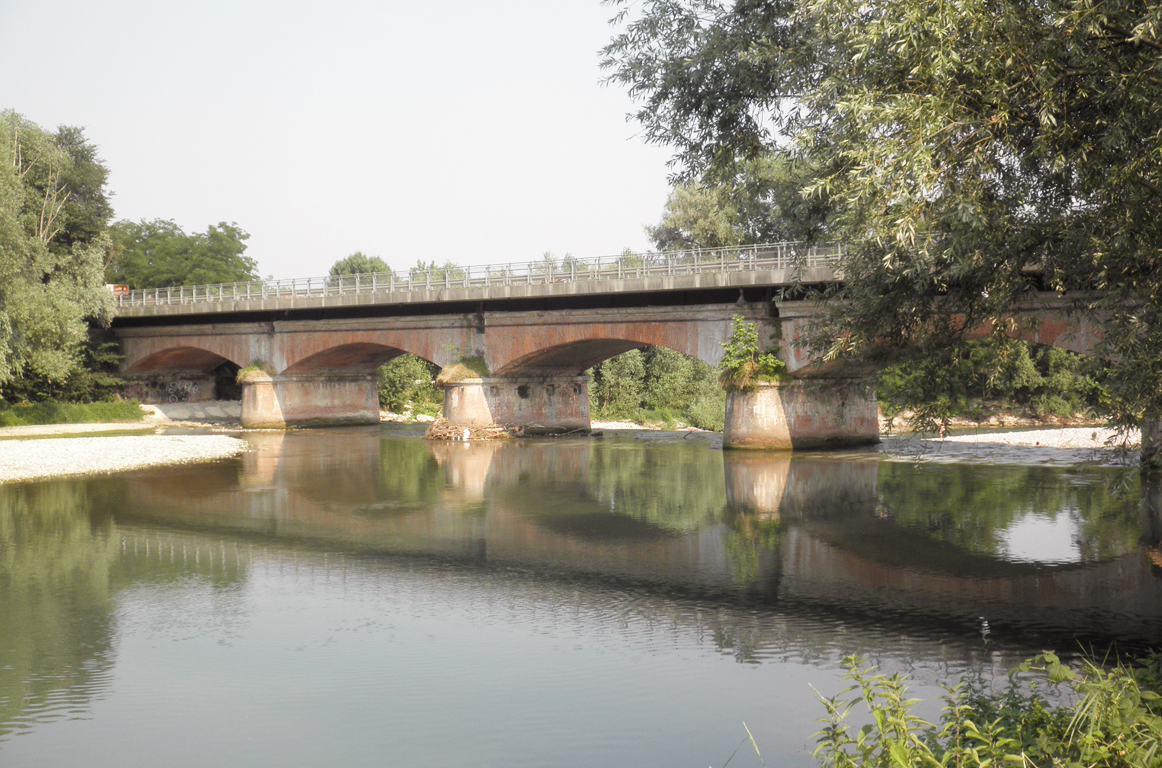
Former Strada statale 235 di Orzinuovi

In Trentino-Alto Adige, the management of state highways has been delegated to the autonomous provinces of Trento and Bolzano since 1998 in application of the changes made by the legislative decree of 2 September 1997, n. 320.

With the legislative decree of 31 March 1998, n. 112, implemented by the Prime Ministerial Decree. of 21 February 2000, many roads, or sections of road, were transferred from the national road property to the regional property, relieving ANAS of their management. Most regions have handed over the management of downgraded state highways to the provinces. Friuli-Venezia Giulia, Lazio and Veneto have created their own companies for the management of former state highways (Friuli-Venezia Giulia Strade, ASTRAL and Veneto Strade respectively).

Having acquired the former state highways, the provinces and regions proceeded to change their numbering, sometimes limiting themselves to replacing SS with SR (regional roads) or with SP (provincial roads), maintaining the number when this did not create numbering conflicts with the existing regional or provincial roads; other times they also changed their number.

== List of notable Italian state highways ==
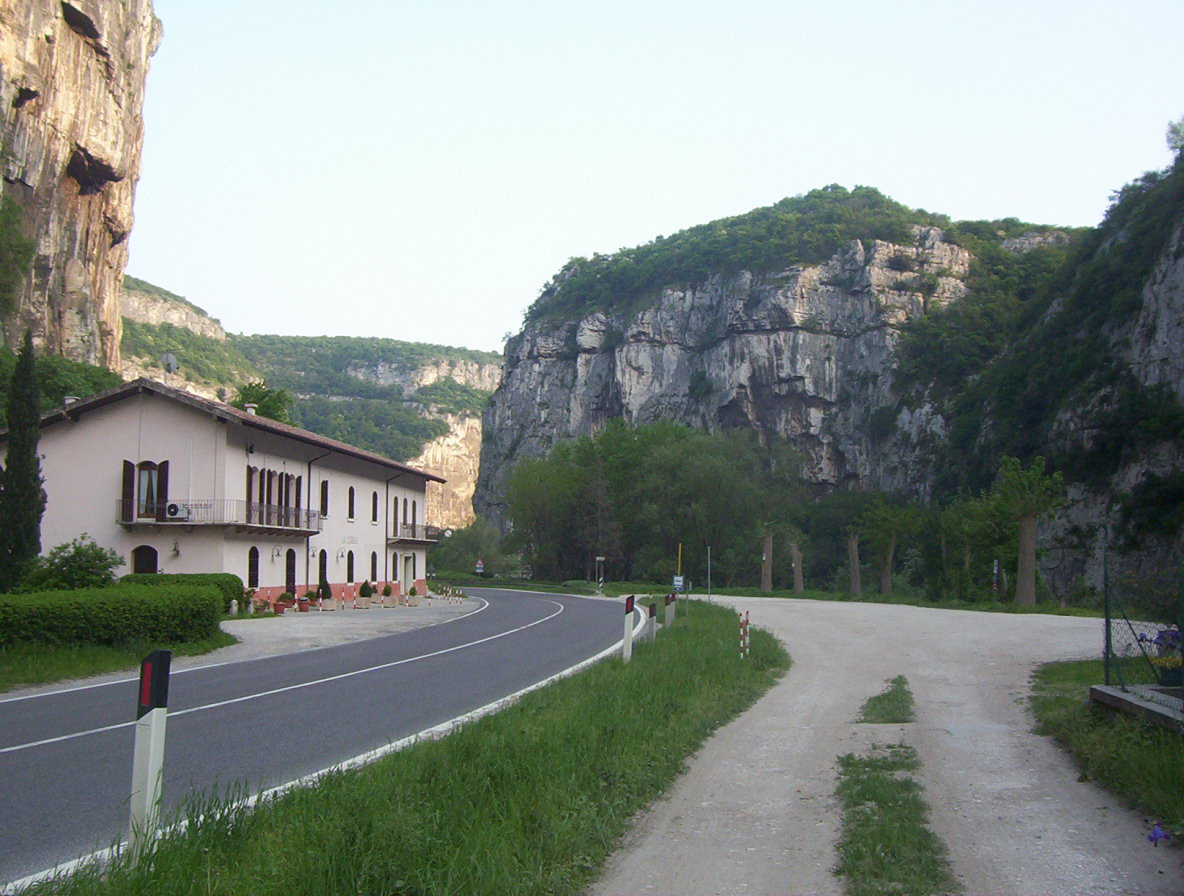
Strada statale 12 dell'Abetone e del Brennero in Dolcè

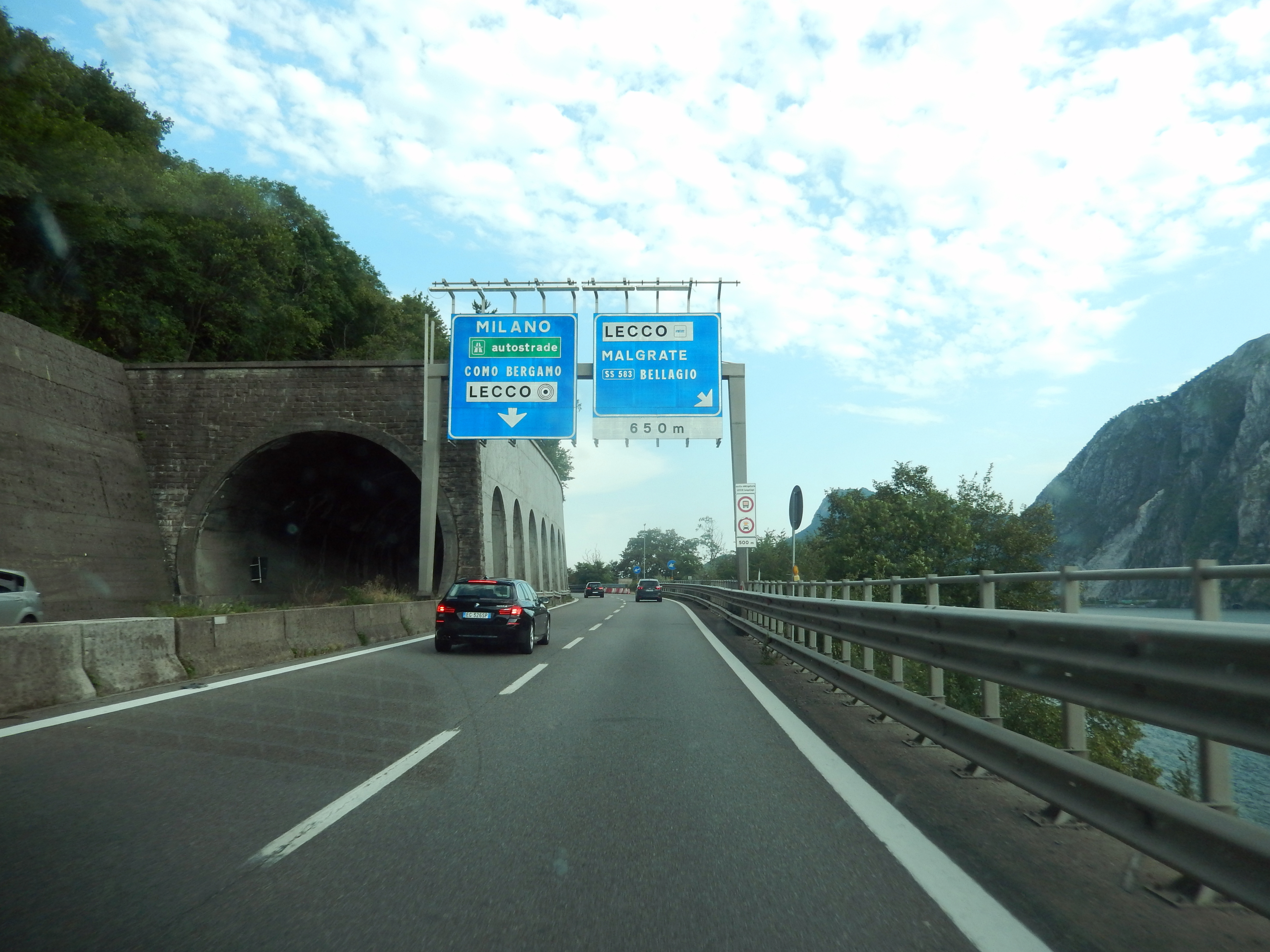
Strada statale 36 del Lago di Como e dello Spluga in Lecco

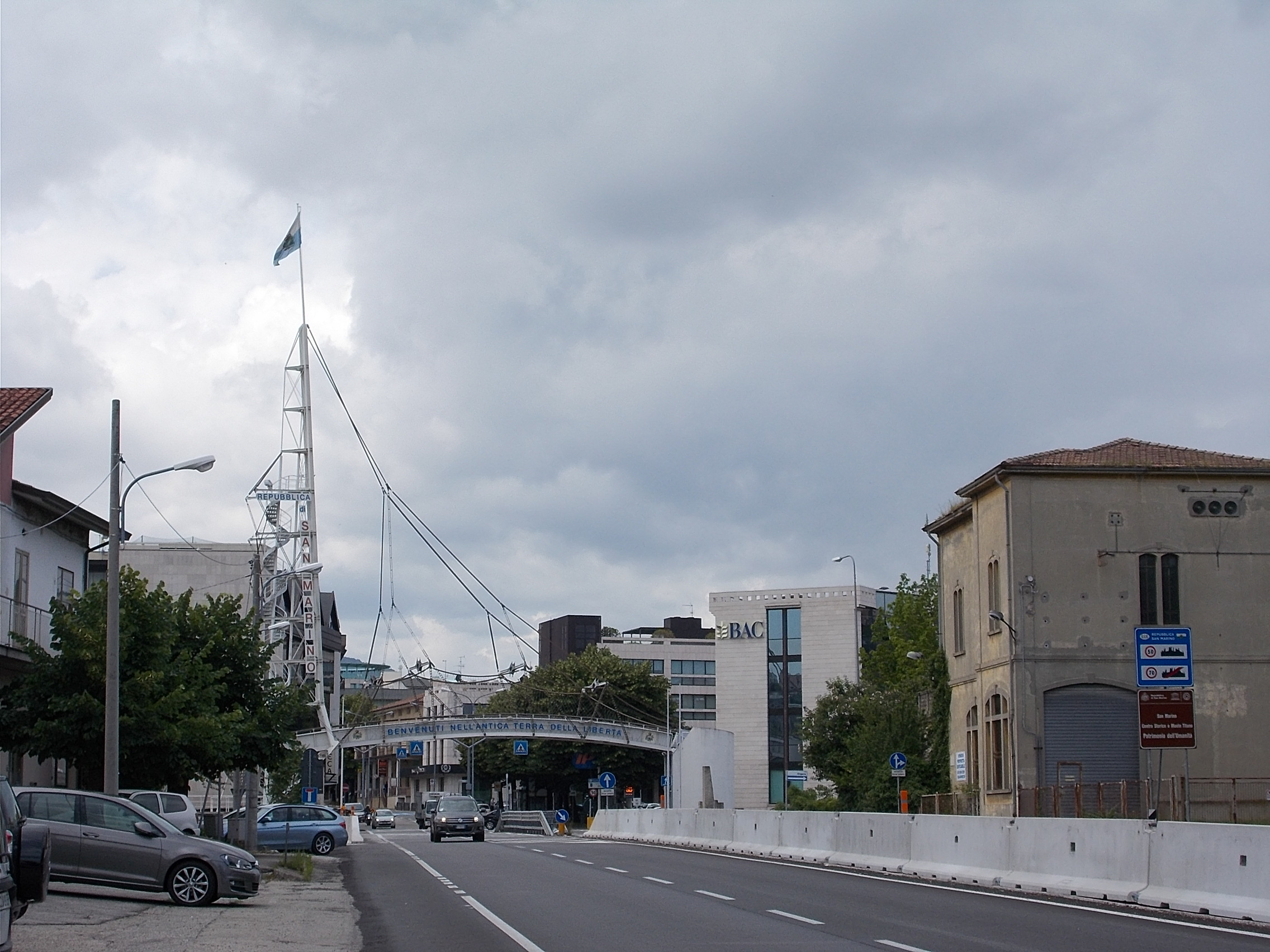
Strada statale 72 di San Marino in Rimini

- Strada statale 1 Via Aurelia
- Strada statale 4 Via Salaria
- Strada statale 4 dir
- Strada statale 7 Via Appia
- Strada statale 12 dell'Abetone e del Brennero
- Strada statale 18 Tirrena Inferiore
- Strada statale 35 dei Giovi
- Strada statale 36 del Lago di Como e dello Spluga
- Strada statale 37 del Maloja
- Strada statale 38 dello Stelvio
- Strada statale 44 del Passo di Giovo
- Strada statale 44 bis Passo del Rombo
- Strada statale 48 delle Dolomiti
- Strada statale 72 di San Marino
- Strada statale 106 Jonica
- Strada statale 115 Sud Occidentale Sicula
- Strada statale 125 Orientale Sarda
- Strada statale 131 Carlo Felice
- Strada statale 131 Diramazione Centrale Nuorese
- Strada statale 148 Pontina
- Strada statale 163 Amalfitana
- Strada statale 336 dell'Aeroporto della Malpensa
- Strada statale 407 Basentana

=== Former ===
- Strada statale 70 della Consuma
- Strada statale 234 Codognese
- Strada statale 235 di Orzinuovi
- Strada statale 310 del Bidente

== See also ==
- Transport in Italy
- Roads in Italy

=== Other Italian roads ===
- Autostrade of Italy
- Regional road (Italy)
- Provincial road (Italy)
- Municipal road (Italy)
