= Municipal road (Italy) =

Municipal road system of Italy

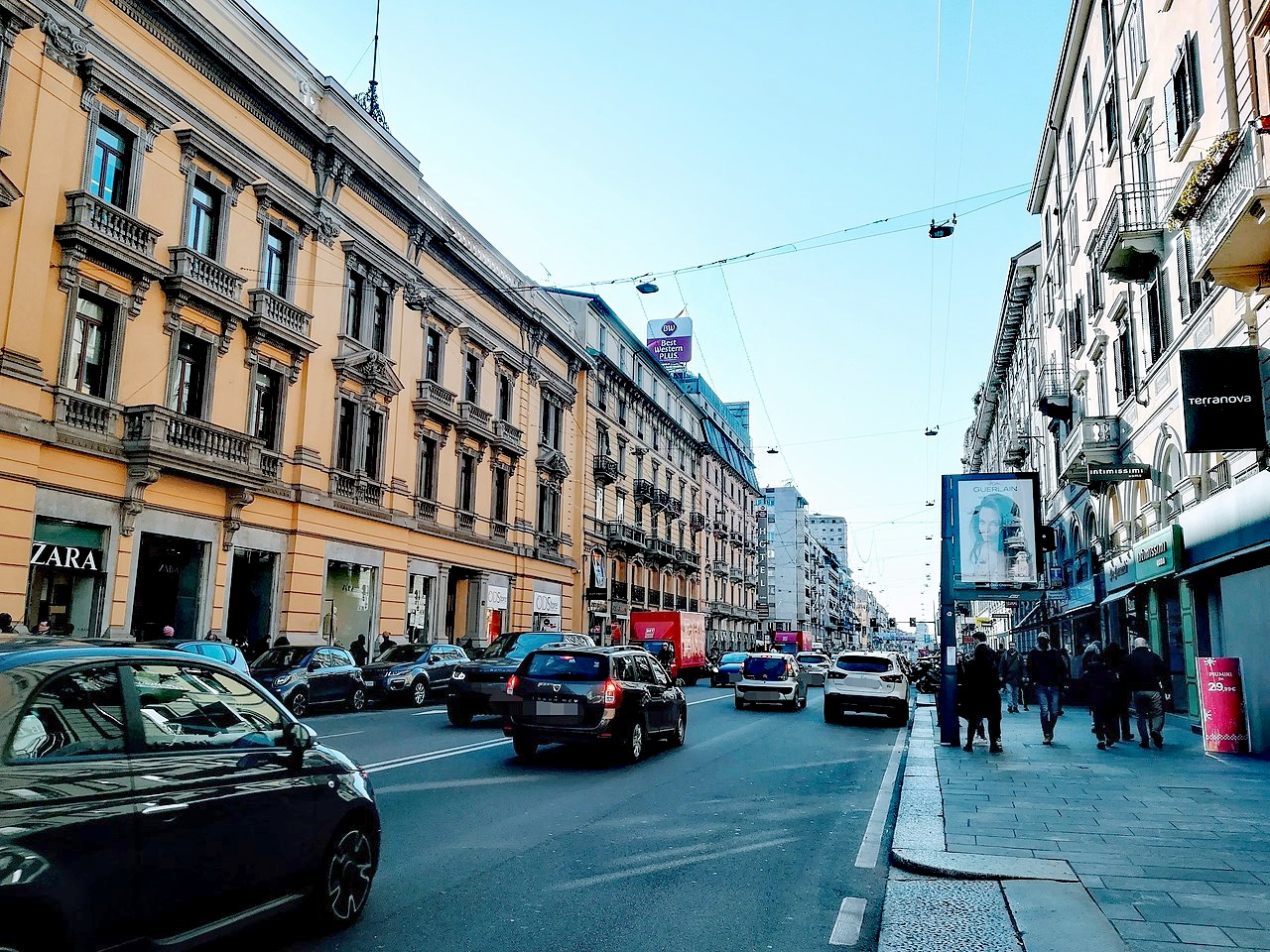
Corso Buenos Aires in Milan, an urban strada comunale classified as strada locale.

A strada comunale (Italian for municipal road; pl. "strade comunali"), abbreviated SC, is an Italian road that is maintained by comune, hence the name. They can be roads owned by comune (inside population centers) or roads managed by the comune (outside population centers). A municipal road is less important than a provincial road.

== Description ==
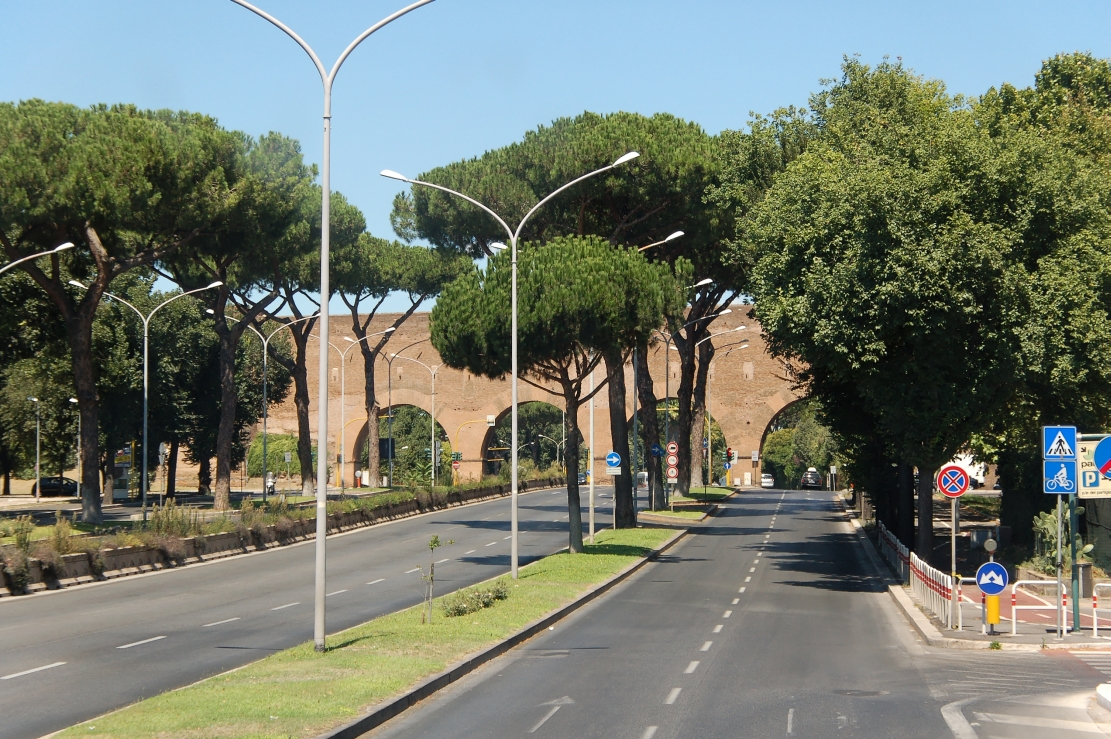
Via Cristoforo Colombo at Porta Ardeatina in Rome, an urban strada comunale classified as strada urbana di scorrimento.

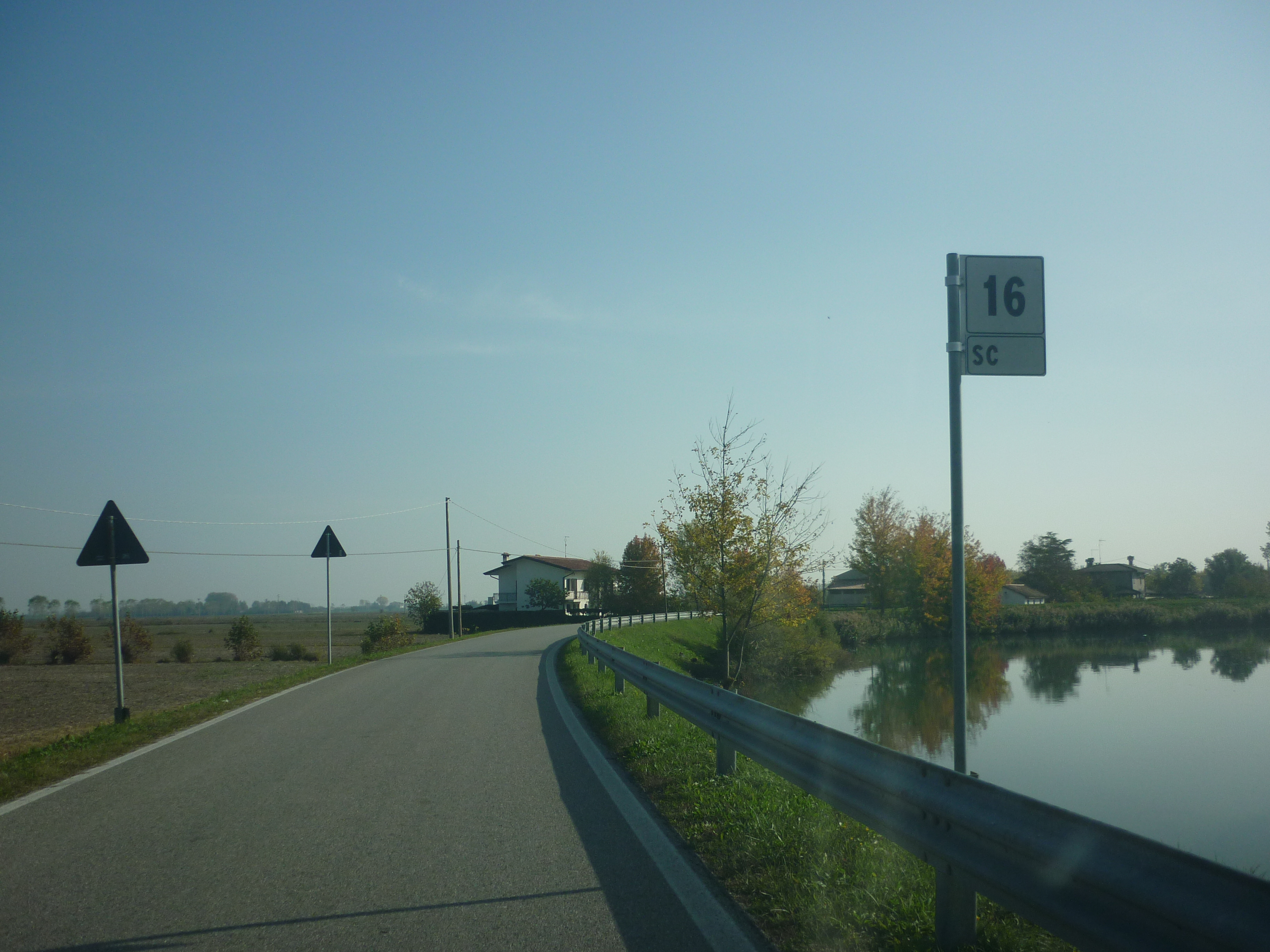
Extra-urban strada comunale in Veneto region marked with a number and with the abbreviation SC. Very rarely extra-urban strade comunali are marked with a number and with the abbreviation SC.

The category of strade comunali includes extra-urban roads considered to be of municipal importance, all urban roads as well as the urban sections of state, regional or provincial roads, which pass through centers with 10,000 or more inhabitants. The urban sections of state, regional or provincial roads that pass through towns with fewer than 10,000 inhabitants are not municipal.

Strade comunali within inhabited centers can be classified from a construction-technical point of view either as urban roads (type D and E) or as local roads (type F). Extra-urban municipal roads (outside inhabited centers) can be technically classified as strade extraurbane principali (type B; "main extra-urban roads"), strade extraurbane secondarie (type C; "secondary extra-urban roads"), strade urbane di scorrimento (type D; "urban traffic roads") or strada locale (type F; local roads).

Assuming that the urban roads within the inhabited centers are all owned by the municipality (with the exception of the internal sections of state, regional or provincial roads that pass through inhabited centers with a population not exceeding 10,000 inhabitants), it is understood that the extra-urban roads outside the inhabited centers are to be considered municipal when:

- they connect the capital of the municipality with its hamlets or join the hamlets together;
- they connect the capital of the municipality with the railway, tram or car station, with an airport or sea, lake or river port, with interports or intermodal exchange nodes or with the localities that are home to essential services of interest to the municipal community;
- they belong to state property (see State Archive of State Property) or if acquired with an act of expropriation of private land (see City Council Resolution).

The useful elements to assume that a road is municipal property are: its location within the inhabited centres, its name in the toponymy and consequently in the cadastral maps, its house numbering, presence of lighting and water collection, be constantly maintained by the municipal body.

== Nomenclature ==
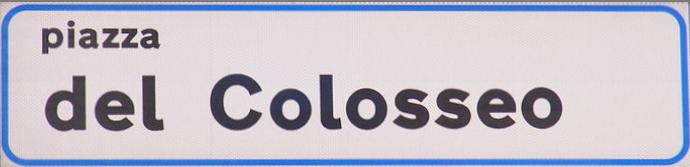
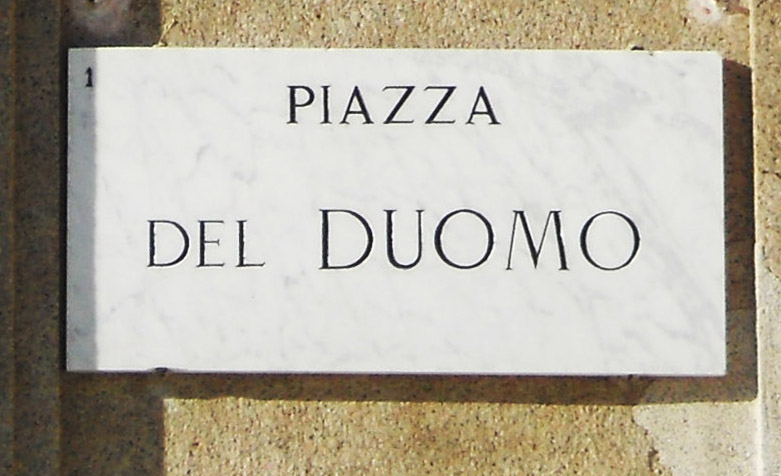
Road signs for a strada comunale within an inhabited center

Road sign for extra-urban strade comunali in use since 1992

Road sign for extra-urban strade comunali in use from 1979 to 1992

Road sign for extra-urban strade comunali in use until 1979

The municipal roads within the inhabited centers are named as via, viale, corso, piazza, piazzetta, etc. followed by a name (for example via Adige). The names of municipal roads within inhabited centers are shown on rectangles, standardized by the Italian Highway Code, with a white background (except for local specificities, such as the Venetian nizioleti).

Extra-urban strade comunali may be identified by a number. In road signs and maps the number is preceded by the acronym SC, an acronym for strada comunale ("municipal road"). In road signs the alphanumeric acronym is enclosed in a white rectangle with a black acronym. Very rarely extra-urban strade comunali are marked with a number and with the abbreviation SC.

== See also ==
- Transport in Italy
- Roads in Italy

=== Other Italian roads ===
- Autostrade of Italy
- State highways (Italy)
- Regional road (Italy)
- Provincial road (Italy)
