= Marconi Express =

Monorail line in Bologna, Italy

Coordinates: 44.5179°N 11.3183°E

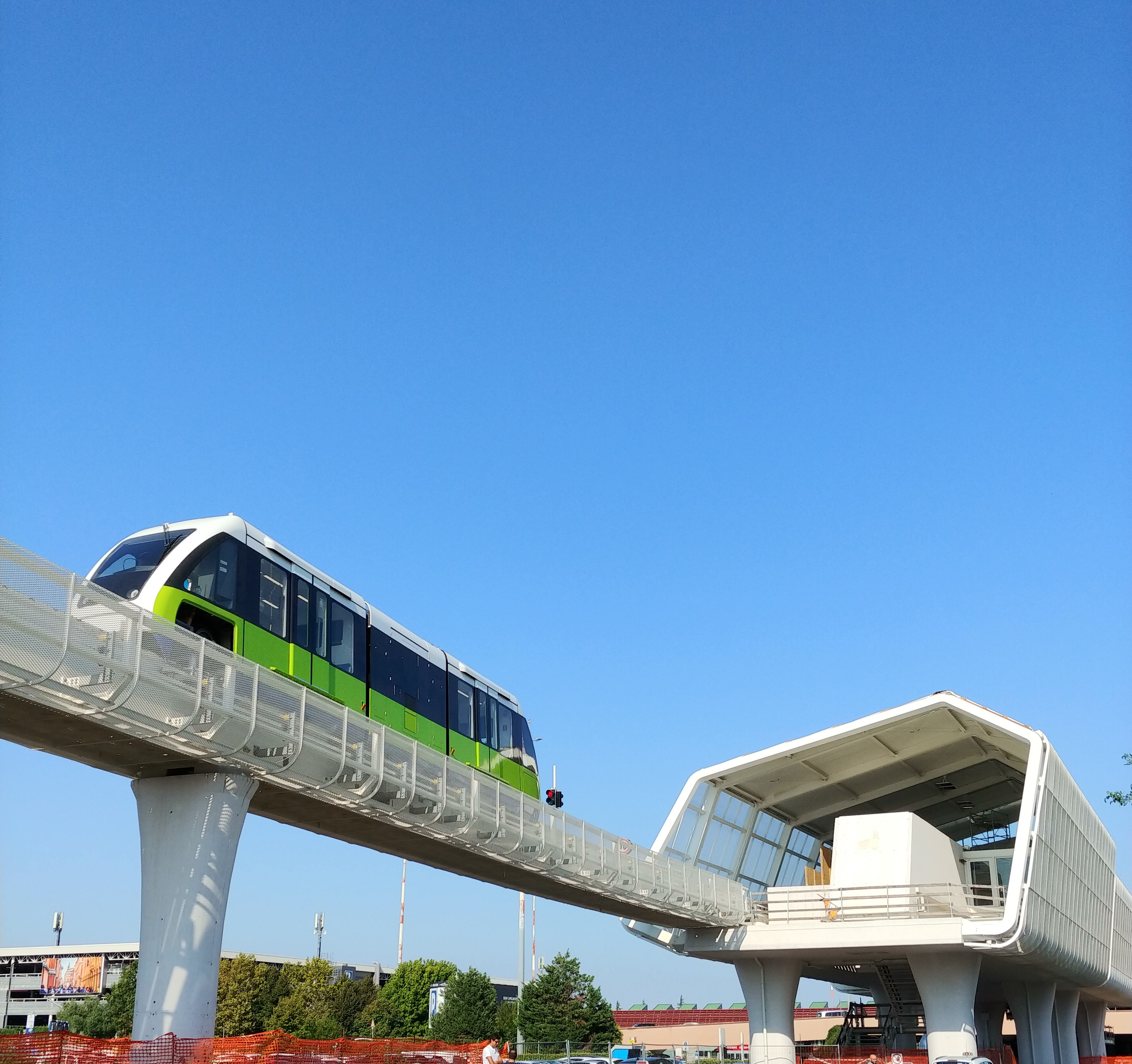
- Marconi Express in Bologna Airport terminal

Overview
- Locale: Bologna, Italy
- Transit type: People mover
- Number of lines: 1
- Number of stations: 3
- Chief executive: Rita Finzi
- Website: www.marconiexpress.it

Operation
- Began operation: 18 November 2020
- Operator: Marconi Express
- Number of vehicles: 3
- Train length: 17 m

Technical
- System length: 5.095 kilometres (3.2 mi)
- No. of tracks: 1
- Average speed: 40 km/h (25 mph)
- Top speed: 70 km/h (43 mph)
System map
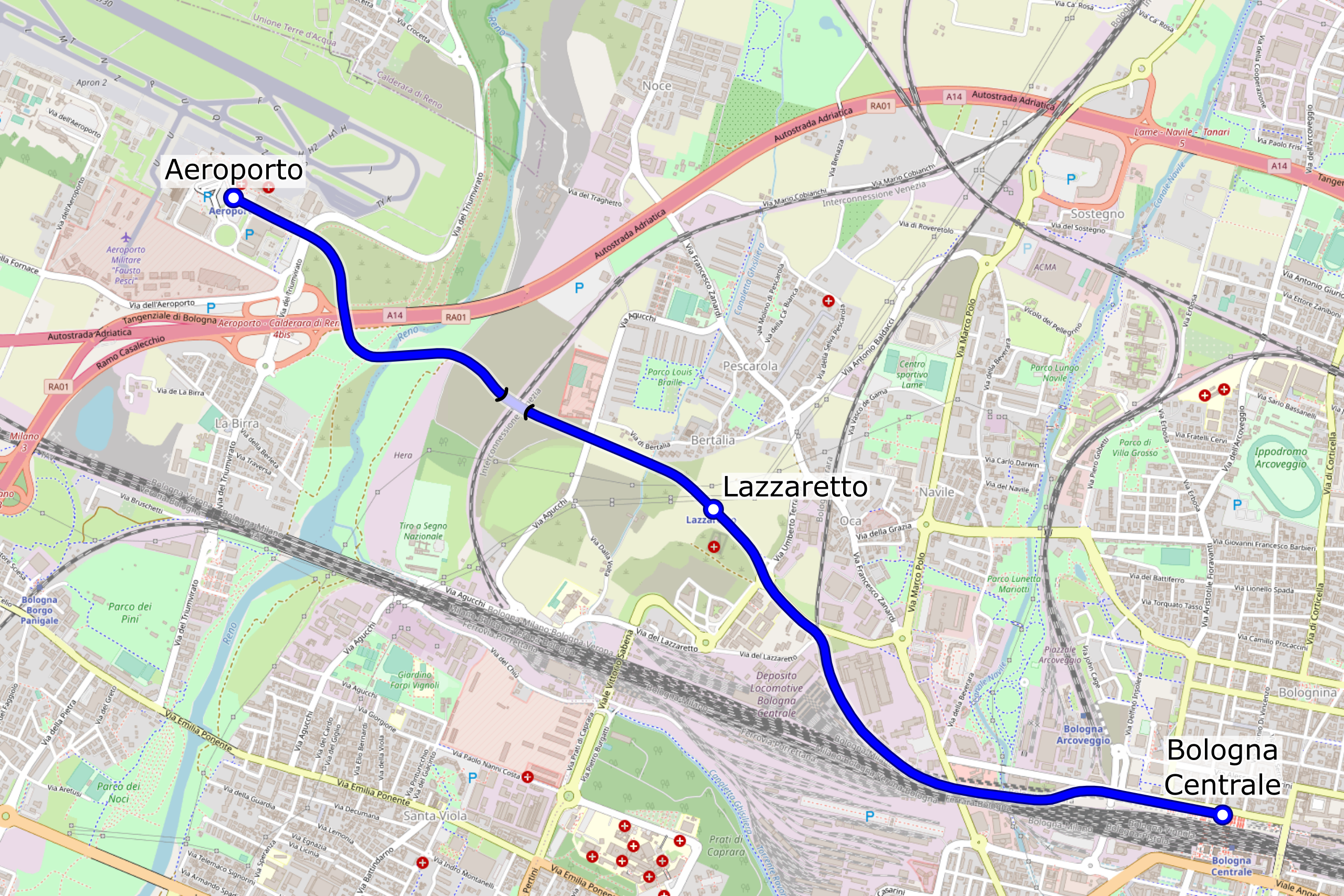

The Marconi Express is a monorail line in Bologna, Italy. At 5.095 kilometres (3.2 mi) in length, it links Bologna Guglielmo Marconi Airport to Bologna Centrale railway station, with an intermediate station and depot at Lazzaretto and a travel time of 7 minutes and 20 seconds.

The monorail trains have been provided by Intamin Transportation. The three trainsets are each capable of carrying up to 48 passengers. The coordinated design of the infrastructure was carried out by the engineering companies MATE Engineering and STS of Bologna, while the architectural design is by Massimo Iosa Ghini.

Building works were completed in 2018 and the line was scheduled to start operating on 7 March 2020. However, the date of inauguration was subsequently postponed. The line has been open to public service since 18 November 2020.

However, soon after its inauguration, the service started suffering significant disruptions, culminating in its suspension between November 2021 and February 2022, with surreptitious substitution via normal buses, despite customers paying the full fare.

The three trainsets currently operating on Marconi Express can transport a maximum of 576 passengers per hour per direction. The design of the infrastructure allows for up to four trainsets to operate on the line at the same time.

== Route ==
The system consists of an elevated monorail, supported by 125 pre-made concrete pylons, 5,2 to 18 meters high, 35–40 meters apart from each other.

The monorail overpasses Autostrada A14 and Tangenziale di Bologna with a 90–100 meters-long, single-span bridge. It also overpasses the Reno river and the Padua–Bologna railway, while it overpasses the high speed railway link from the Padua-Bologna railway to Bologna's underground high speed railway station.

The route starts from Bologna Centrale railway station, where the former platforms 12-15 were located, next to via dei Carracci; after 5.095 km it reaches the opposite terminus, at Bologna Guglielmo Marconi Airport. The total travel time is about 7 minutes and 20 seconds, while the former Aerobus shuttle bus required 18–23 minutes.

The intermediate station of Lazzaretto is double tracked, allowing cars traveling to opposite directions to cross each other. The Lazzaretto station also acts as a warehouse-workshop and centralized command post. In the immediate vicinities of such station, there are the Trenitalia Regional Directorate for Emilia-Romagna and the "Deposito Locomotive Bologna Centrale", one of the two railway maintenance depots in Bologna, alongside Bologna Ravone.

Contrary to the other Italian people movers, which are cableways (horizontal funicular), the one in Bologna is powered by a 750 V direct current (converters are supplied by the multinational ABB); this is the same voltage as trolleybuses in Bologna, as well as the Bologna tramway, which is under construction as of 2025.

== Stations ==
The three stations (Aeroporto, Lazzaretto and Bologna Centrale) are equipped with lifts and escalators. The access route has no steps, and the route from Bologna Centrale station to the Marconi airport terminal is fully sheltered.

All three stations are protected by entrance and exit turnstiles.

There are automatic ticket machines in the stations. It is also possible to open the turnstiles directly by contactless card (Pay & Go mode): the system charges the correct rate based on the entrance and exit turnstiles, allowing passengers to automatically take advantage of the return rate if the return journey takes place within 30 days, or the reduced rate if only traveling on the Bologna Centrale to Lazzaretto stretch.

== Service ==
The service runs daily from 5:40 to midnight. Trains run every 15 minutes, or every 7:30 minutes at peak times.

When service is interrupted, TPER operates a bus replacement service from Bologna Centrale railway station to the airport calling at Lazzaretto. The buses used for this service were those previously used for the BLQ route and currently used on routes 944 and 945 (now route Q). TPER's replacement bus is currently numbered 943.

== Trainsets ==
The Marconi Express trainsets are bidirectional and consist of two separate wagons each. Each shuttle can carry up to 48 passengers and can reach a top speed of 70 km/h.

In the first weeks of operation of the Marconi Express, due to regulations linked to the COVID-19 pandemic in Italy, the capacity of each trainset was reduced to 50%, limiting the capacity to 24 passengers per trainset (12 passengers per wagon).

Trainsets are equipped with onboard monitors and free WiFi.

== See also ==
- Bologna
- List of monorail systems
