= Raccordo autostradale RA8 =

Controlled-access highway in Italy

Raccordo autostradale 8
- Motorway connection 8
- Raccordo autostradale Ferrara-Porto Garibaldi; Ferrara-Porto Garibaldi motorway connection

Route information
- Maintained by ANAS
- Length: 49.0 km (30.4 mi)
- Existed: 1973–present

Major junctions
- West end: Ferrara
- A13 in Ferrara
- East end: Comacchio

Location
- Country: Italy
- Regions: Emilia-Romagna

Highway system
- Roads in Italy; Autostrade; State; Regional; Provincial; Municipal
← RA 6	→ RA 9

Raccordo autostradale 8 (RA 8; "Motorway connection 8") or Raccordo autostradale Ferrara-Porto Garibaldi ("Ferrara-Porto Garibaldi motorway connection") is an autostrada (Italian for "motorway") 49.0 kilometres (30.4 mi) long in Italy located in the region of Emilia-Romagna and managed by ANAS, which connects the Autostrada A13 in Ferrara to the Adriatic Sea in the comune of Comacchio, near Porto Garibaldi.

== Route ==
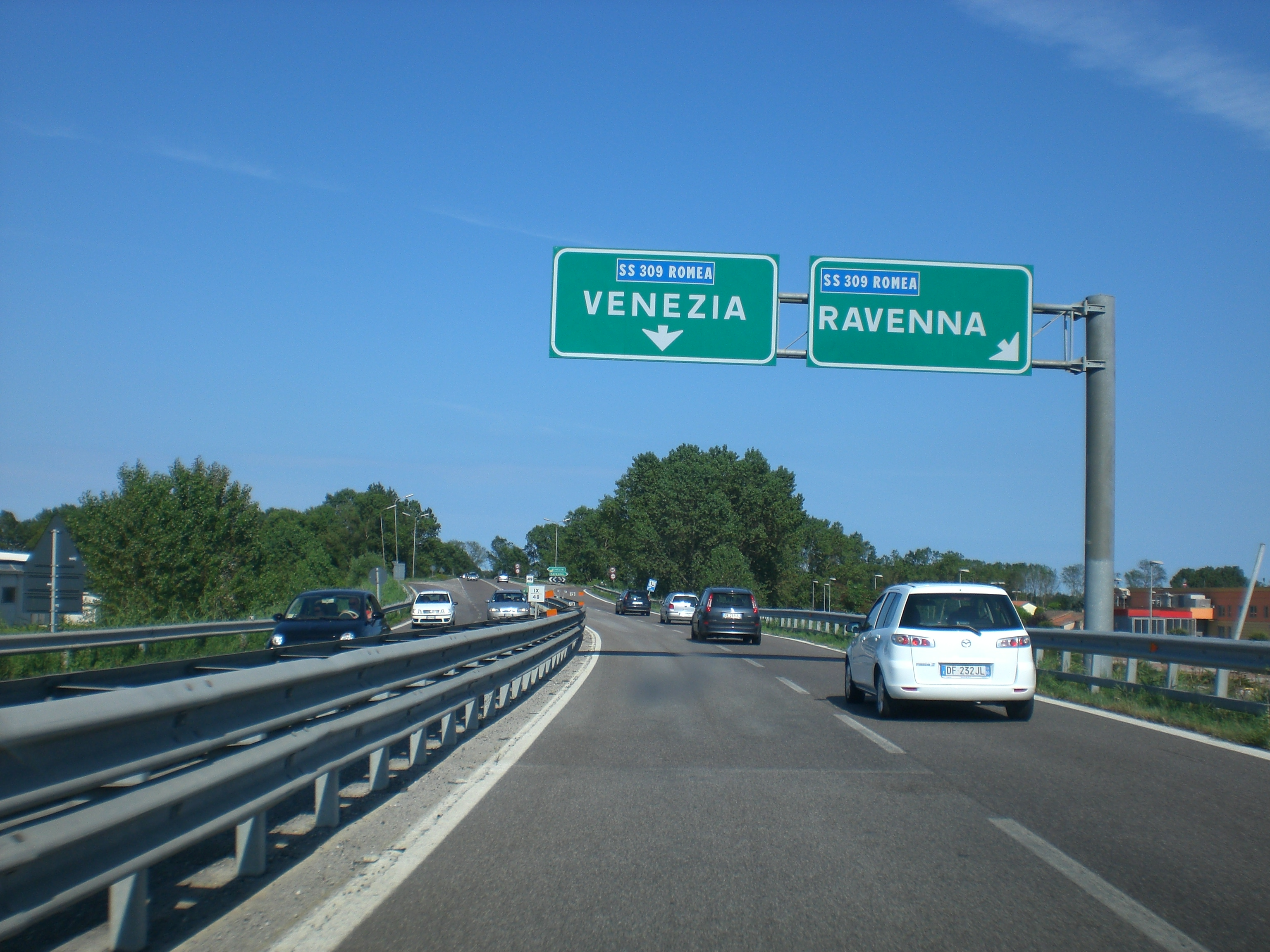
Raccordo autostradale RA8 near Comacchio

RACCORDO AUTOSTRADALE 8 Raccordo autostradale Ferrara-Porto Garibaldi
Exit	↓km↓	↑km↑	Province	European Route
Diramazione per Ferrara; Bologna; Padova	−6.3 km (−3.9 mi)	55.3 km (34.4 mi)	FE	--
Ferrara; Adriatica	0.0 km (0 mi)	49.0 km (30.4 mi)	FE	--
Cona	5.7 km (3.5 mi)	42.6 km (26.5 mi)	FE	--
Gualdo	8.2 km (5.1 mi)	40.1 km (24.9 mi)	FE	--
Masi San Giacomo - Masi Torello	13.3 km (8.3 mi)	34.5 km (21.4 mi)	FE	--
Rovereto	19.8 km (12.3 mi)	28.6 km (17.8 mi)	FE	--
Portomaggiore - Migliarino	23.3 km (14.5 mi)	25.1 km (15.6 mi)	FE	--
Ostellato	24.7 km (15.3 mi)	23.7 km (14.7 mi)	FE	--
Corte Centrale	32.1 km (19.9 mi)	16.3 km (10.1 mi)	FE	--
Comacchio	43.4 km (27.0 mi)	5.5 km (3.4 mi)	FE	--
Romea; Venezia; Ravenna	49.0 km (30.4 mi)	0.0 km (0 mi)	FE	--

== See also ==
- Autostrade of Italy
- Roads in Italy
- Transport in Italy

=== Other Italian roads ===
- State highways (Italy)
- Regional road (Italy)
- Provincial road (Italy)
- Municipal road (Italy)
