= Tangenziale di Bologna =

Controlled-access highway in Italy

Raccordo autostradale 1
- Motorway connection 1
- Tangenziale di Bologna

Route information
- Maintained by ANAS
- Length: 22.2 km (13.8 mi)
- Existed: 1967–present

Major junctions
- Beltway around Bologna
- West end: Casalecchio di Reno
- A1 in Casalecchio di Reno; A14 in Casalecchio di Reno; A13 in Castel Maggiore; A14 in Castel Maggiore; A14 in San Lazzaro di Savena
- East end: San Lazzaro di Savena

Location
- Country: Italy
- Regions: Emilia-Romagna

Highway system
- Roads in Italy; Autostrade; State; Regional; Provincial; Municipal
→ RA 2

Map of Bologna's motorway system

The Tangenziale di Bologna ("Bologna ring road") or Raccordo autostradale 1 (RA 1; "Motorway connection 1") is an autostrada (Italian for "motorway") 22.2 kilometres (13.8 mi) long in Italy located in the region of Emilia-Romagna serving the urban area of Bologna.

It runs parallel to Autostrada A14 from Casalecchio di Reno, west of Bologna, to San Lazzaro di Savena, east of Bologna.

It was projected by engineers Francesco Fantoni and Giorgio Mondini; construction works lasted three years, and the infrastructure was inaugurated on 12 July 1967.

== Route ==
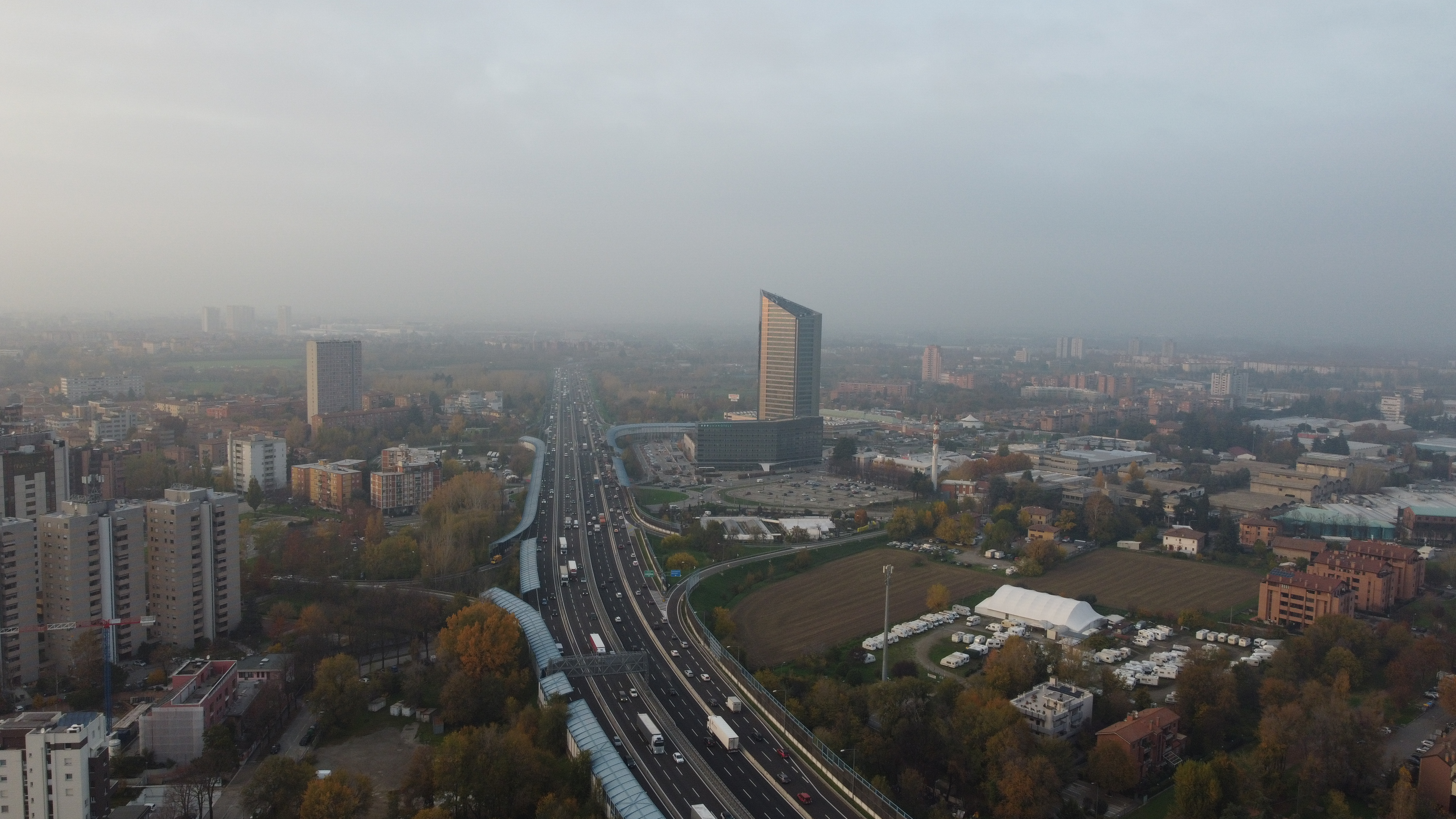
Tangenziale di Bologna from the Unipol Tower

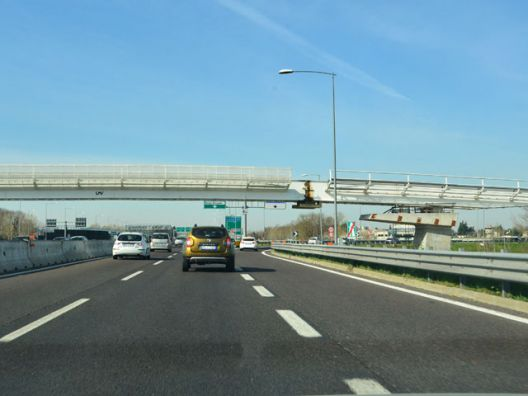
Tangenziale di Bologna near Calderara di Reno

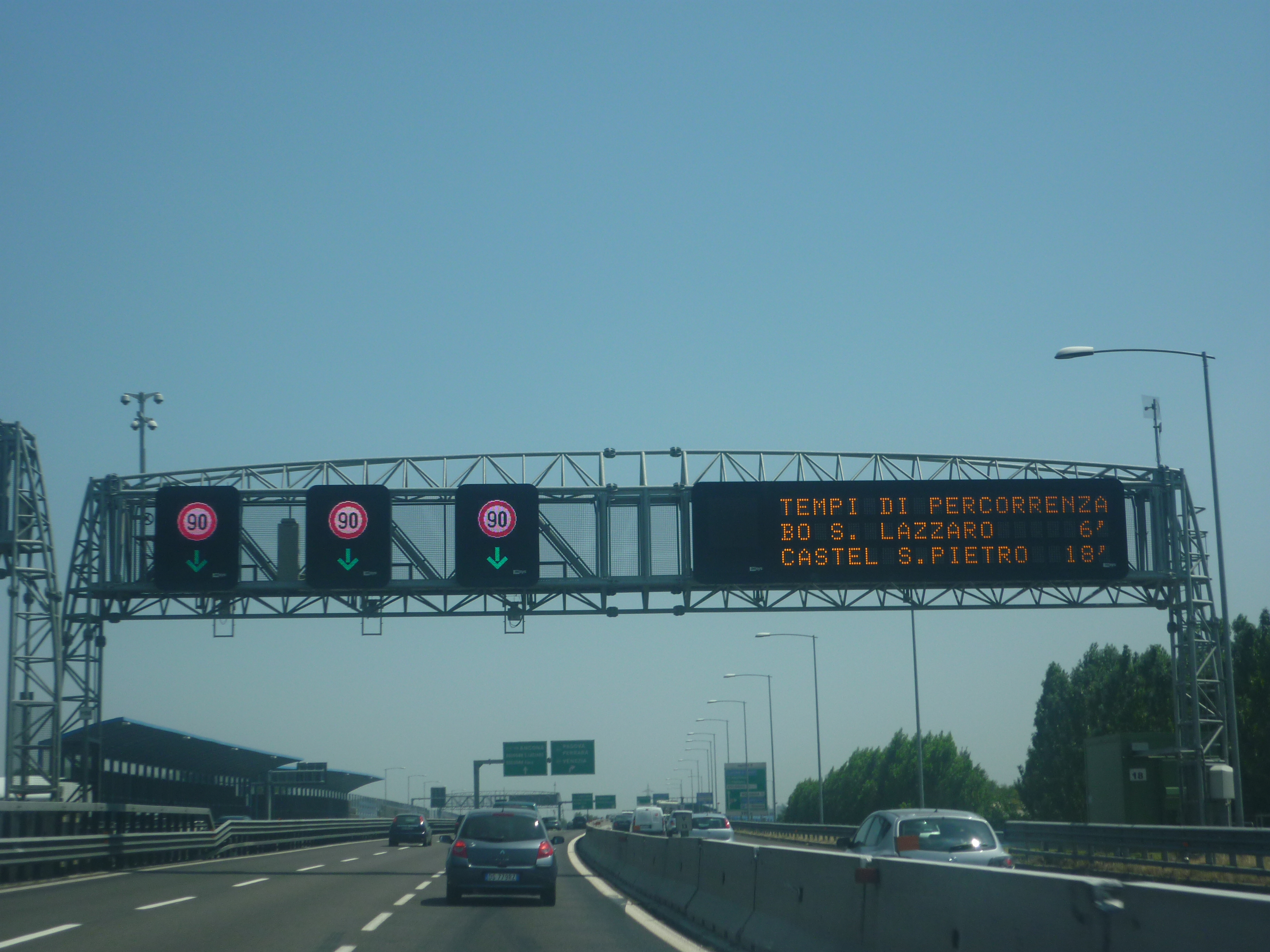
Tangenziale di Bologna near San Lazzaro di Savena

TANGENZIALE DI BOLOGNA; Raccordo autostradale 1
Exit	↓km↓	↑km↑	Province	European Route
Milan – Florence; Taranto	0.0 km (0 mi)	19.0 km (11.8 mi)	BO	--
Toll gate Bologna Casalecchio	0.45 km (0.28 mi)	18.6 km (11.6 mi)	BO	--
Casalecchio di Reno; Porrettana; Bologna Saragozza; Certosa di Bologna; Sanctuary of the Madonna of San Luca; Stadio Renato Dall'Ara - Ospedale Maggiore; Shopping center Meridiana	0.5 km (0.31 mi)	18.1 km (11.2 mi)	BO	--
Maranello - Vignola - Bazzano - Zola Predosa; Bazzanese; Monte San Pietro - Vergato; Palasport Casalecchio	0.75 km (0.47 mi)	18.1 km (11.2 mi)	BO	--
Bologna; Borgo Panigale; Reno	2.6 km (1.6 mi)	15.7 km (9.8 mi)	BO	--
Ramo Verde; Milan; Barriera di Bologna Borgo Panigale; Via Emilia; San Giovanni in Persiceto	4.0 km (2.5 mi)	14.8 km (9.2 mi)	BO	--
Via del Triumvirato; Via Emilia Ponente	5.0 km (3.1 mi)	13.6 km (8.5 mi)	BO	--
Bologna Guglielmo Marconi Airport; Calderara di Reno	5.5 km (3.4 mi)	13.2 km (8.2 mi)	BO	--
Bologna; Navile; National Research Council; Museo d'Arte Moderna di Bologna + Tanari parking Trebbo di Reno	8.8 km (5.5 mi)	9.8 km (6.1 mi)	BO	--
Castel Maggiore; Bologna; Corticella; Arcoveggio; Bolognina; Industrial Heritage Museum of Bologna; Town hall of Bologna	10.0 km (6.2 mi)	9.0 km (5.6 mi)	BO	--
Ferrara - Padova; Barriera di Bologna Arcoveggio	10.5 km (6.5 mi)	8.0 km (5.0 mi)	BO	--
Fiera di Bologna via Stalingrado; University of Bologna	11.0 km (6.8 mi)	7.8 km (4.8 mi)	BO	--
Porrettana; Ferrara	11.2 km (7.0 mi)	7.5 km (4.7 mi)	BO	--
Fiera di Bologna via Michelino; Headquarters of the Emilia-Romagna Region; Camping	12.3 km (7.6 mi)	6.4 km (4.0 mi)	BO	--
Granarolo dell'Emilia viale Europa; Agro-Food Center of Bologna Ortomercato; University of Bologna	12.6 km (7.8 mi)	6.0 km (3.7 mi)	BO	--
Bologna; San Donato; Bologna San Donato railway test circuit	13.0 km (8.1 mi)	5.4 km (3.4 mi)	BO	--
Roveri Industrial Area; Vehicle registration	13.6 km (8.5 mi)	4.7 km (2.9 mi)	BO	--
Bologna; San Vitale via Massarenti via Lenin via Larga; Policlinico Sant'Orsola-Malpighi	15.0 km (9.3 mi)	3.9 km (2.4 mi)	BO	--
San Vitale; Castenaso; Ravenna	15.4 km (9.6 mi)	3.4 km (2.1 mi)	BO	--
Bologna; Mazzini; Bellaria Hospital	16.5 km (10.3 mi)	1.8 km (1.1 mi)	BO	--
San Lazzaro di Savena; Via Emilia della Futa; San Ruffillo; Pianoro; Florence	17.7 km (11.0 mi)	1.0 km (0.62 mi)	BO	--
della Croce dell'Idice; Complanare Sud; Idice; Ozzano dell'Emilia; University of Bologna	18.2 km (11.3 mi)	0.85 km (0.53 mi)	BO	--
Toll gate Bologna San Lazzaro	18.5 km (11.5 mi)	0.55 km (0.34 mi)	BO	--
Bologna - Taranto	19.0 km (11.8 mi)	0.0 km (0 mi)	BO	--

=== Green connection ===
RAMO VERDE; Green connection
Exit	↓km↓	↑km↑	Province	European Route
Taranto; Milan	0.0 km (0 mi)	3.3 km (2.1 mi)	BO	--
Toll gate Borgo Panigale	0.0 km (0 mi)	3.3 km (2.1 mi)	BO	--
Borgo Panigale; Via Emilia Ponente - via Marco Emilio Lepido - Anzola dell'Emilia	0.3 km (0.19 mi)	3.0 km (1.9 mi)	BO	--
Modena	1.5 km (0.93 mi)	1.8 km (1.1 mi)	BO	--
Tangenziale di Bologna	3.3 km (2.1 mi)	0.0 km (0 mi)	BO	--

== See also ==
- Autostrade of Italy
- Roads in Italy
- Transport in Italy

=== Other Italian roads ===
- State highways (Italy)
- Regional road (Italy)
- Provincial road (Italy)
- Municipal road (Italy)
