= Altedo =

Frazione of Italy

- Frazione
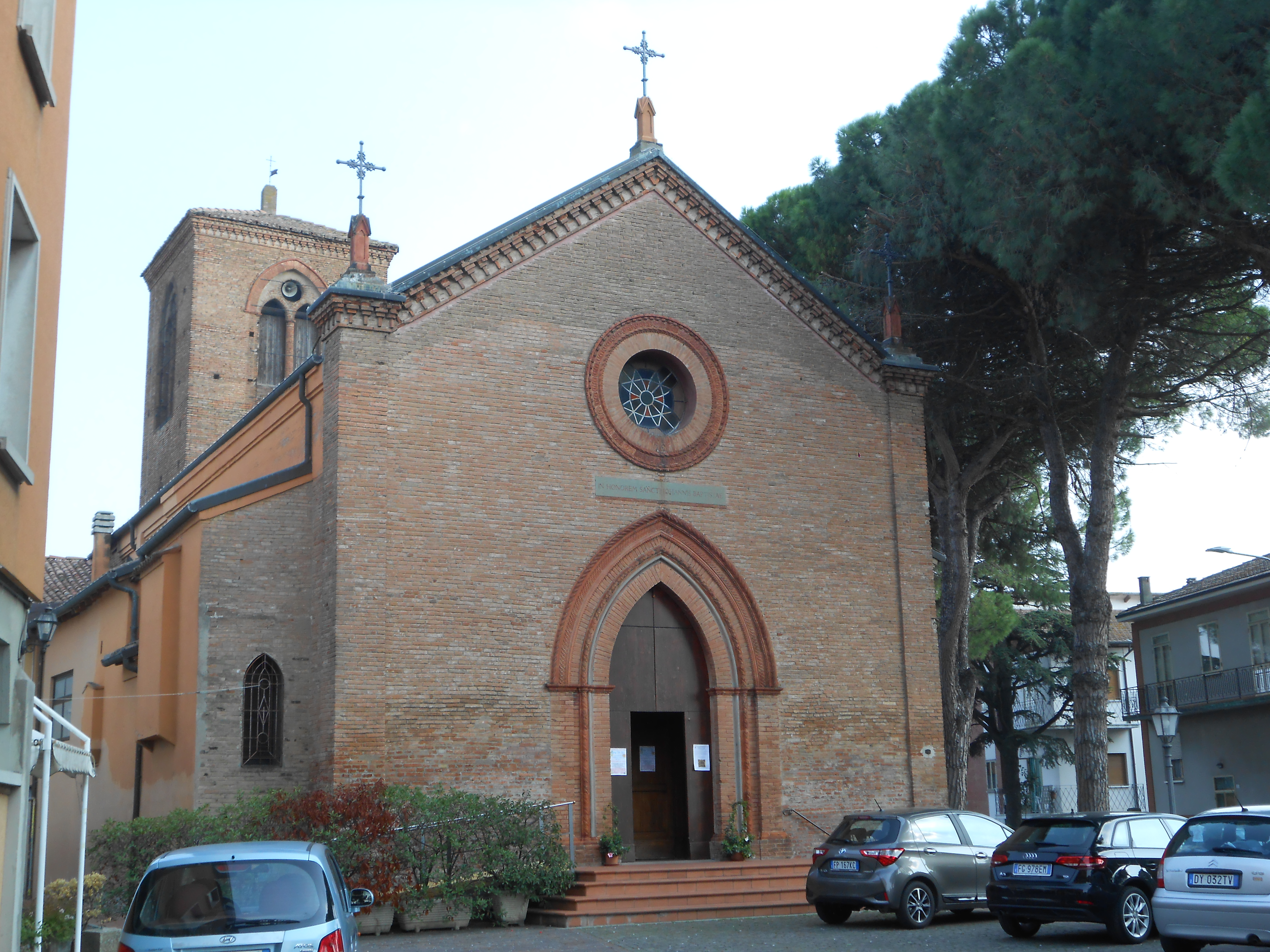
- Parish church of St. John the Baptist

- Location of Altedo in Italy
- Coordinates: 44°39′50″N 11°29′20″E
- Country: Italy
- Region: Emilia-Romagna
- Metropolitan city: Metropolitan City of Bologna
- Comune: Malalbergo
- Elevation: 11 m (36 ft)
- Demonym: Altedesi
- Time zone: UTC+1 (CET)
  - Summer (DST): UTC+2 (CEST)
- Postal code: 40051
- Dialing code: 051
- Patron saint: St. John the Baptist
- Saint day: June 24

Altedo is a frazione of the comune of Malalbergo in the Metropolitan City of Bologna in the Emilia-Romagna region of Italy.

== Geography ==
Altedo is 8 kilometres (5.0 mi) Malalbergo in the direction of Bologna. Bologna is 20 kilometres (12 mi) away. The State Road 64 Porrettana crosses the frazione. In the immediate vicinity of Altedo is the same-named exit of the Autostrada A13.

Being located in the Po Valley, Altedo has an altitude of only 11 metres (36 ft) above sea level.

== Monuments and places of interest ==
=== Religious architecture ===
- Church of St. John the Baptist, parish church

== Economy ==
Altedo is known for the green asparagus of Altedo (Protected Geographical Indication). The Altedo asparagus must be produced exclusively in the Metropolitan City of Bologna and the province of Ferrara. Every year, on the third and fourth Sunday of May, the green asparagus festival is held in Altedo.
