= Autostrada A13 (Italy) =

Controlled-access highway in Italy

Autostrada A13

Route information
- Maintained by ANAS
- Length: 116.7 km (72.5 mi)
- Existed: 1970–present

Major junctions
- South end: Bologna
- A1, A14 and RA 1 in Bologna; RA 8 in Ferrara; A31 in Villamarzana; A4 in Padua
- North end: Padua

Location
- Country: Italy
- Regions: Veneto, Emilia-Romagna

Highway system
- Roads in Italy; Autostrade; State; Regional; Provincial; Municipal
← A 12	→ A 14

Autostrada A13 is an autostrada (Italian for "motorway") 116.7 kilometres (72.5 mi) long in Italy located in the regions of Veneto and Emilia-Romagna which connects Bologna to Padua, passing through Ferrara and Rovigo. Near the two extremities of the track are situated two of the biggest Italian freight villages, in Bologna and Padua. Snow tyres are compulsory from 15 November to 15 April on the whole highway track, according to the Italian directives.

== History ==
The first section of the motorway, from Bologna to Ferrara South, was opened to traffic on 22 December 1966.

On 10 August 1968 the segment from Ferrara South to Ferrara North was opened. On 7 August 1969 the section from Boara to Padua was inaugurated.

Furthermore, it was the first highway on which anti-fog signage has been implemented.

In 1964 it was proposed to lengthen the motorway from Padua to Treviso (another city in Veneto, Italy), and then up to Tarvisio (a small village along the borders between Italy, Austria, and Slovenia), but this was never done.

== The highway today ==
The track begins from the orbital road around Bologna, that connects the three important highways in Bologna: A13 towards Padua, A1 (Milan-Naples), and A14 (Bologna-Taranto). The highway ends in Padua, at the junction with A4 (Turin-Trieste).

The whole route is in the Po Valley and passes through Emilia-Romagna and Veneto. The only uplands in the surroundings are Colli Euganei, the famous thermal area with Abano Terme in the middle. Due to these kinds of morphological features of the territory that the highway crosses, during the winter-like season the presence of fog is frequent, leading to a poor and reduced visibility.

Its management is assigned to the Italian society Autostrade per l'Italia.

By the exit Ferrara South there is a beltway leading to Porto Garibaldi, a town on the Adriatic Sea, whose first segment (between Ferrara South and the junction with state road SS16) is owned by Autostrade per l'Italia, while from this junction up to SS309 "Romea" it is owned by ANAS. The entire beltway is called Beltway 8 and is about 49 kilometres (30 mi) long.

== Tutor ==
This motorway has been chosen, along with A4 and A14, to experiment new devices (called Safety Tutor) to measure vehicles average speed, working since 2005. Those are metal constructions built on the two sides of the highway and above it. The first tutor, heading Bologna, is situated just before the highway exit for Occhiobello. The second tutor, which calculates the average speed basing on the data collected by the previous one, is located just before the highway exit to Ferrara North.

== Route ==
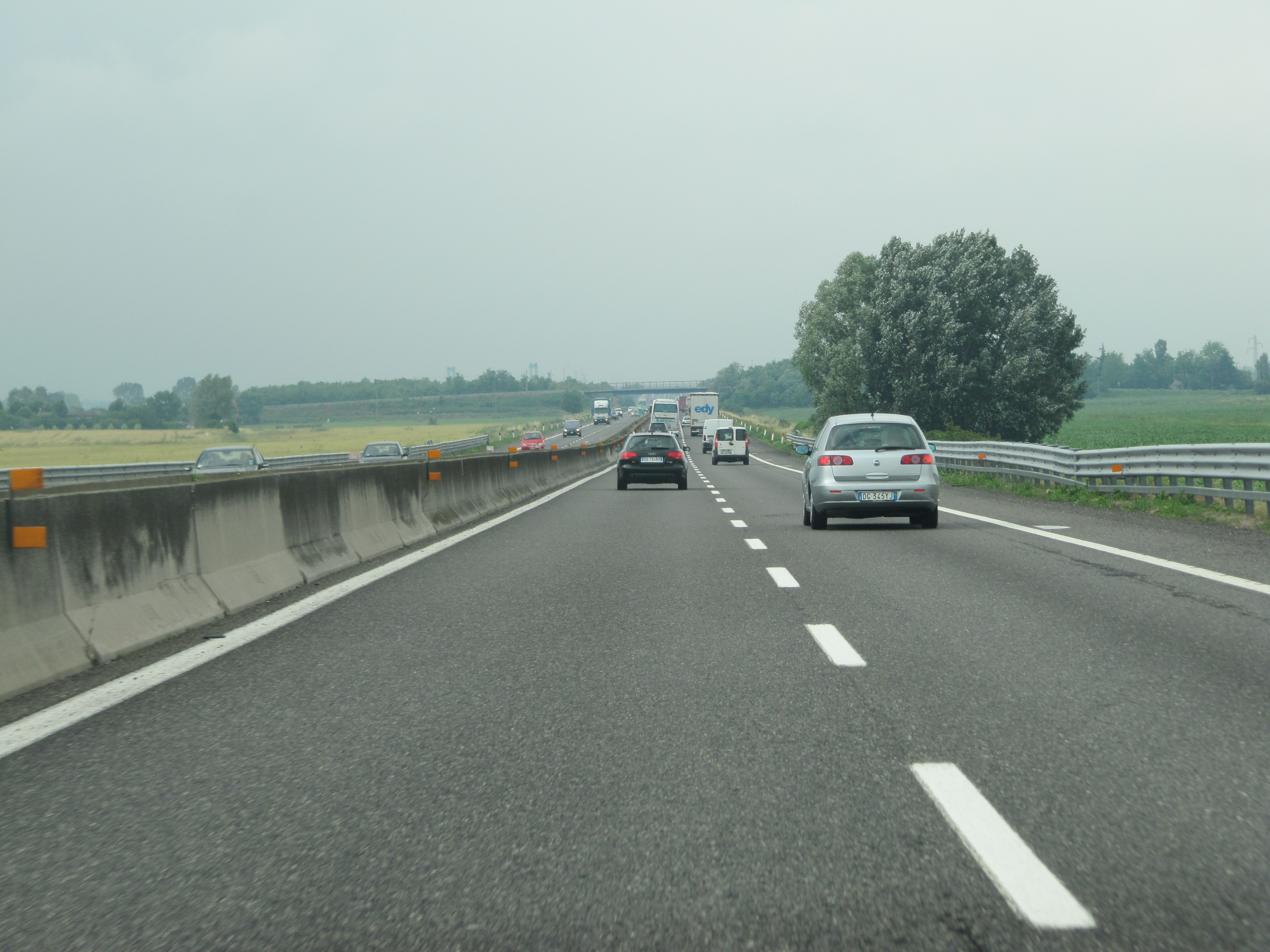
Autostrada A13 near Rovigo

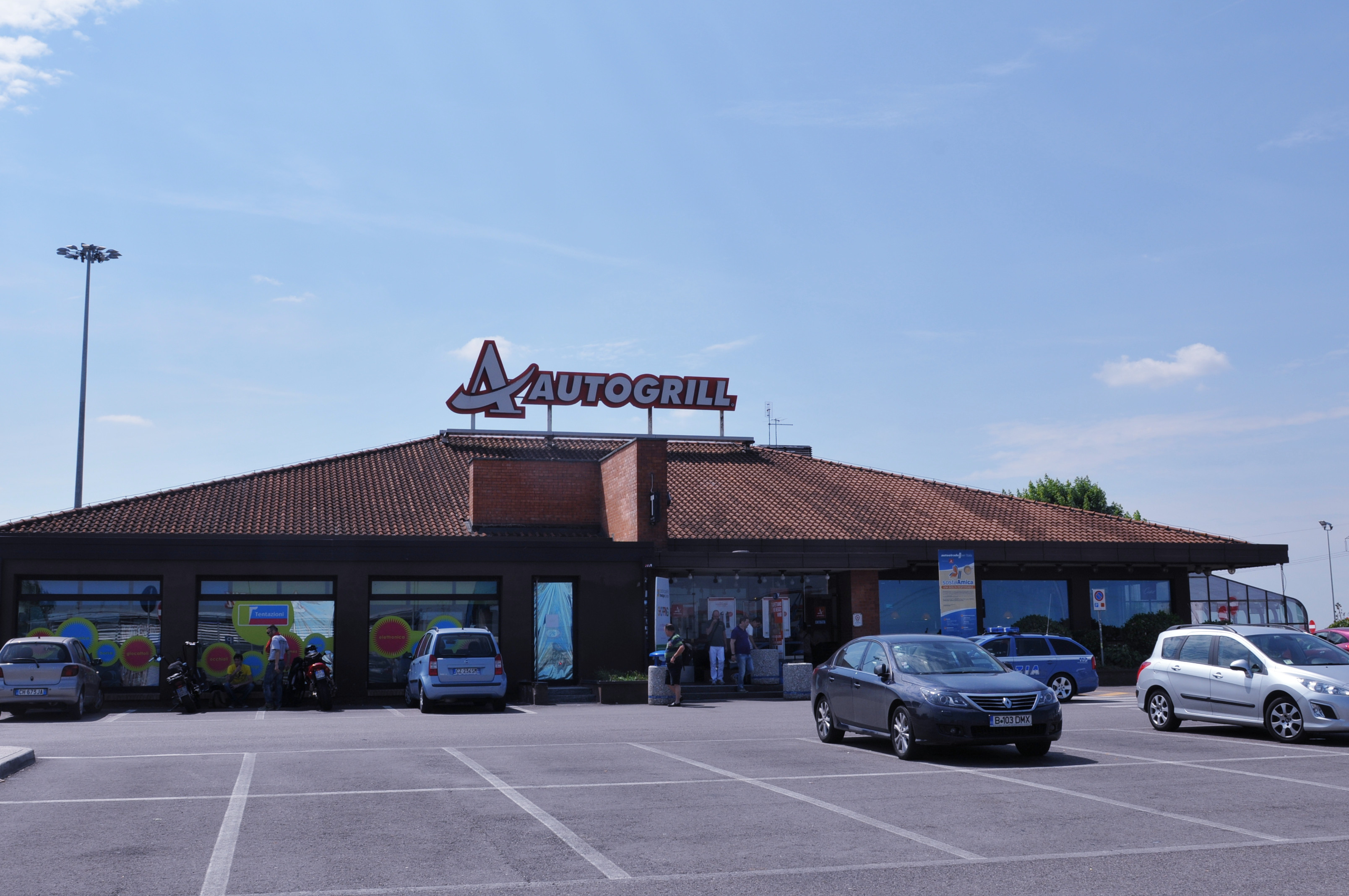
Rest area "Po"

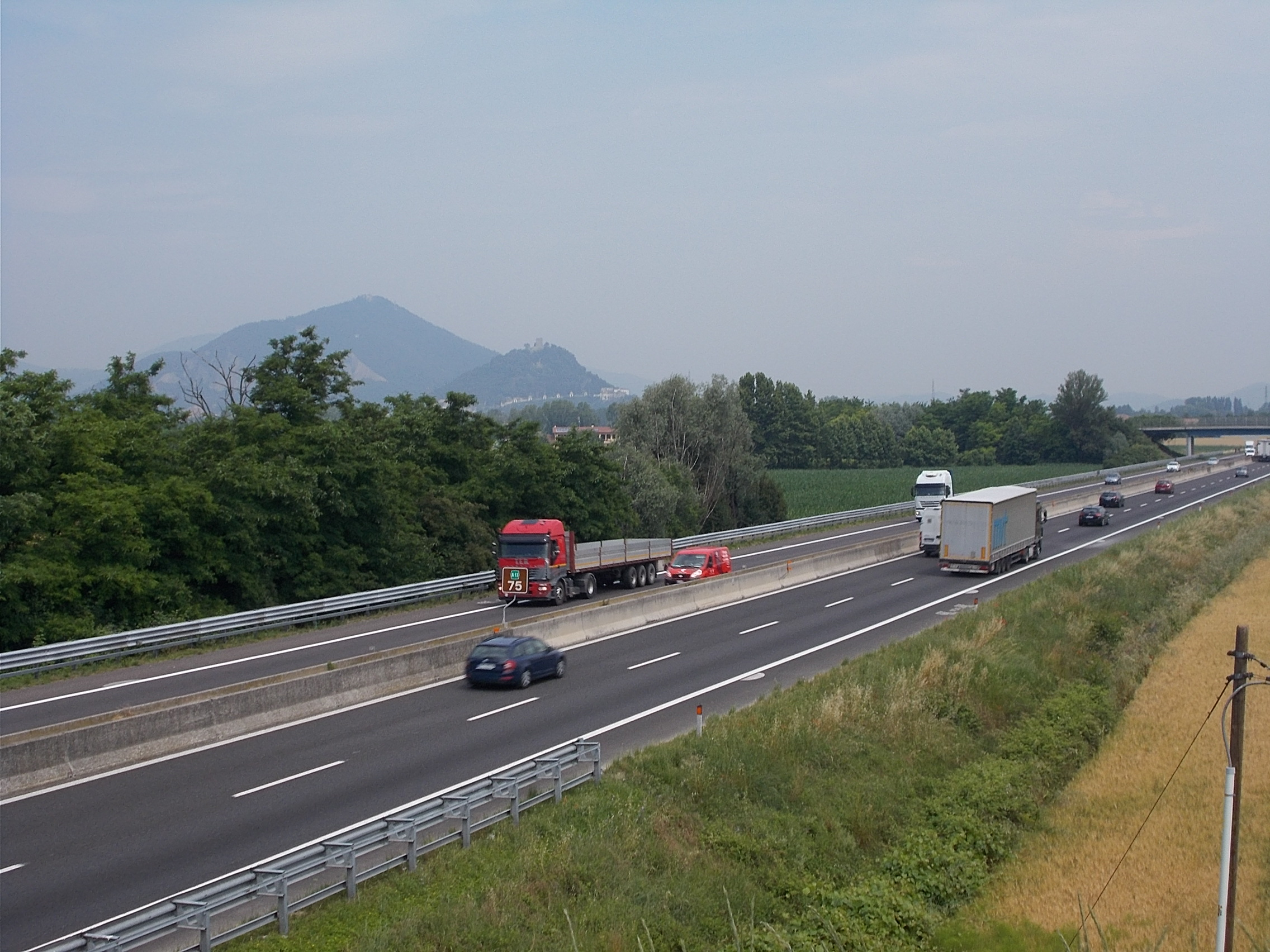
Autostrada A13 near Monselice

BOLOGNA - PADOVA
Exit	↓km↓	↑km↑	Province
Bologna Borgo Panigale - Bologna Casalecchio; Bologna Borgo Panigale Airport; Milano - Firenze; Bologna Fiera - Bologna San Lazzaro - Ancona; Tangenziale di Bologna	0.0 km (0 mi)	116.7 km (72.5 mi)	BO
Bologna Arcoveggio; Tangenziale di Bologna	0.6 km (0.37 mi)	116.1 km (72.1 mi)	BO
Bologna Interporto	7.9 km (4.9 mi)	108.8 km (67.6 mi)	BO
Rest area "Castel Bentivoglio"	11.7 km (7.3 mi)	105.0 km (65.2 mi)	BO
Altedo	20.5 km (12.7 mi)	96.2 km (59.8 mi)	BO
Ferrara sud Porto Garibaldi	33.7 km (20.9 mi)	83.0 km (51.6 mi)	FE
Ferrara nord	41.9 km (26.0 mi)	74.8 km (46.5 mi)	FE
Rest area "Po"	43.4 km (27.0 mi)	73.3 km (45.5 mi)	FE
Occhiobello	49.1 km (30.5 mi)	67.6 km (42.0 mi)	RO
Villamarzana - Rovigo sud Transpolesana; Piovene Rocchette - Badia Polesine	63.0 km (39.1 mi)	53.7 km (33.4 mi)	RO
Rest area "Adige"	65.3 km (40.6 mi)	51.4 km (31.9 mi)	RO
Rovigo	70.4 km (43.7 mi)	46.3 km (28.8 mi)	RO
Boara - Rovigo nord	74.8 km (46.5 mi)	41.9 km (26.0 mi)	PD
Monselice	88.6 km (55.1 mi)	28.1 km (17.5 mi)	PD
Terme Euganee	95.0 km (59.0 mi)	21.7 km (13.5 mi)	PD
Rest area "San Pelagio"	98.2 km (61.0 mi)	18.5 km (11.5 mi)	PD
Padova sud Diramazione Padova sud	101.0 km (62.8 mi)	15.0 km (9.3 mi)	PD
Padova Industrial area	112.4 km (69.8 mi)	4.3 km (2.7 mi)	PD
Milano - Venezia	116.7 km (72.5 mi)	0.0 km (0 mi)	PD

=== A13 Branch Padua South ===
The branch to Padua South links the motorway A13, west of Padua, with the orbital road around Padua itself. The track is flat, with two lanes for each direction of traffic.

At first the branch used to make up the A13 ending segment. When the section which leads to A4 was built, the junction created was lacking: actually it was not possible neither getting that branch from A13 heading Bologna, nor getting A13 from the branch heading A4. In 2013 the construction site to build the complete interchange (with the remaining ramps) was opened; the work-in-progress finished in April 2017: the new beltway has been opened to traffic on 20 September 2017.

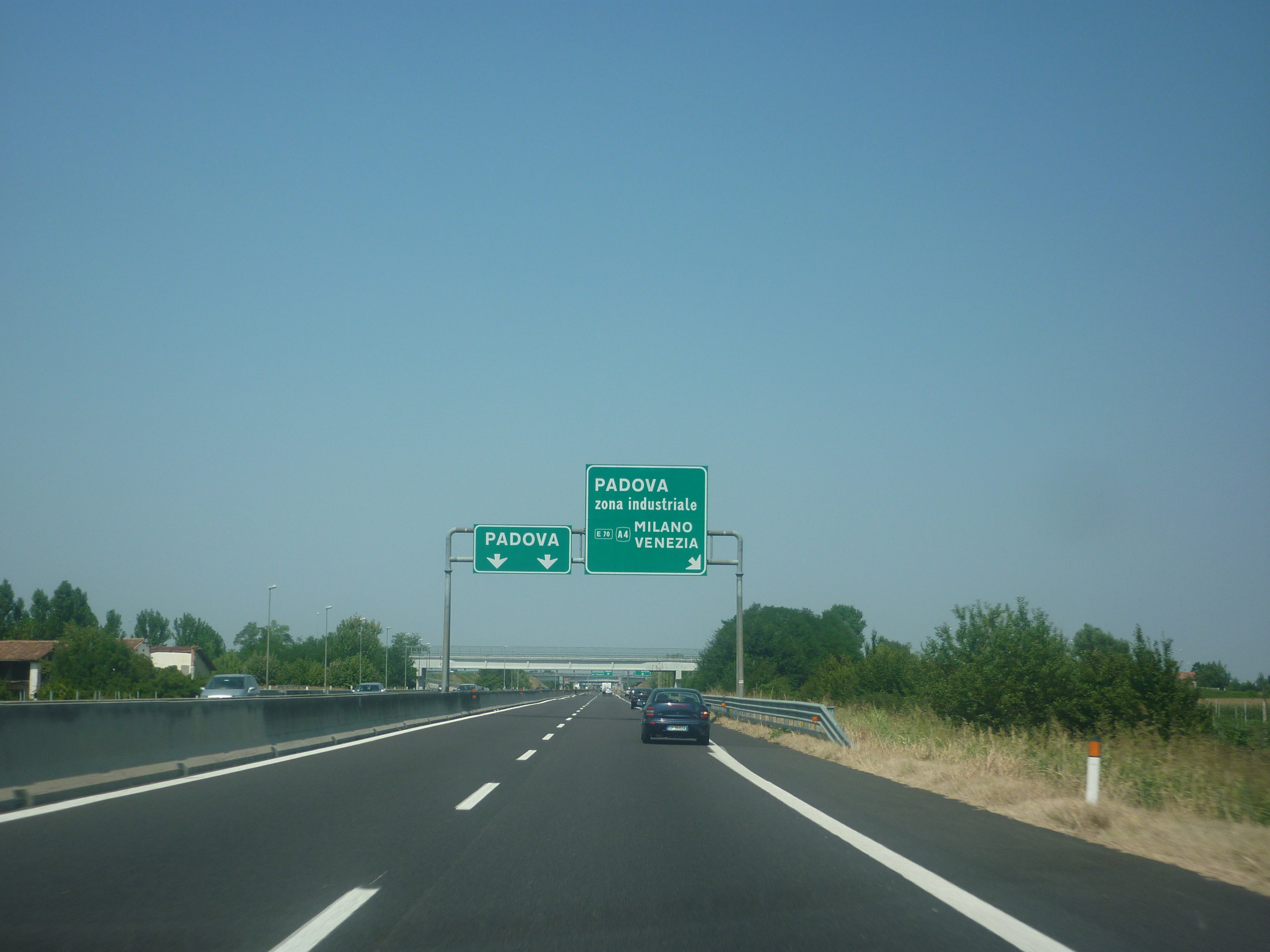
A13 Branch Padua South

DIRAMAZIONE PADOVA SUD; A13 Branch Padua South
Exit	↓km↓	↑km↑	Province
Bologna - Padova	0.0 km (0 mi)	4.3 km (2.7 mi)	PD
Toll gate Padova Sud	0.7 km (0.43 mi)	2.9 km (1.8 mi)	PD
Southern ring road of Padua; Eastern ring road of Padua	2.9 km (1.8 mi)	0.5 km (0.31 mi)	PD
Western ring road of Padua Valsugana	4.3 km (2.7 mi)	0.0 km (0 mi)	PD

=== A13 Branch to Ferrara ===
The branch to Ferrara is 6.3 kilometres (3.9 mi) long and it begins from the A13 interchange Ferrara South. Then it proceeds heading toward Porto Garibaldi uninterruptedly as Beltway 8 for other 49 km.

It was opened to traffic on 22 December 1966.

This branch is internally-classified as D23 by Autostrade per l'Italia.

Furthermore, it is planned an extension (heading west) as far as Rolo-Reggiolo toll booth, on highway A22, realizing the "Autostrada regionale Cispadana" ("Cispadana regional Highway").

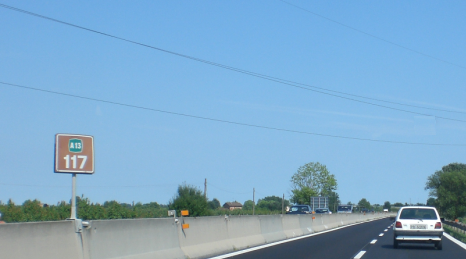
A13 Branch to Ferrara

DIRAMAZIONE FERRARA SUD; A13 Branch to Ferrara
Exit	↓km↓	↑km↑	Province
Bologna - Padova	0.0 km (0 mi)	6.3 km (3.9 mi)	FE
Toll gate Ferrara Sud	0.2 km (0.12 mi)	6.1 km (3.8 mi)	FE
Ferrara Sud - Fiera di Ferrara; Porrettana	0.9 km (0.56 mi)	5.2 km (3.2 mi)	FE
Ferrara Centro; Adriatica	6.0 km (3.7 mi)	0.3 km (0.19 mi)	FE
Porto Garibaldi	6.3 km (3.9 mi)	0.0 km (0 mi)	FE

== See also ==
- Autostrade of Italy
- Roads in Italy
- Transport in Italy

=== Other Italian roads ===
- State highways (Italy)
- Regional road (Italy)
- Provincial road (Italy)
- Municipal road (Italy)
