= Autostrada A14 (Italy) =

Controlled-access highway in Italy

Autostrada A14
- Autostrada Adriatica; Adriatic motorway

Route information
- Part of E45, E55 and E843
- Maintained by ANAS
- Length: 743.4 km (461.9 mi)
- Existed: 1965–present

Major junctions
- North end: Bologna
- A1 in Bologna; RA 1 in Bologna; A13 in Bologna; RA 11 in Ascoli Piceno; A25 in Pescara; RA 12 in Pescara; A16 in Cerignola
- South end: Taranto

Location
- Country: Italy
- Regions: Emilia-Romagna, Marche, Abruzzo, Molise, Apulia

Highway system
- Roads in Italy; Autostrade; State; Regional; Provincial; Municipal
← A 13	→ A 15

The Autostrada A14 or Autostrada Adriatica ("Adriatic motorway") is the second-longest (743.4 kilometres (461.9 mi)) autostrada (Italian for "motorway") in Italy located in the regions of Emilia-Romagna, Marche, Abruzzo, Molise and Apulia. It is a part of the E45, E55 and E843 European routes.

Its northern end is Bologna (where it branches off the Autostrada A1) and its southern ending is at Taranto. The motorway stretches along the entire Adriatic coast. Inaugurated in 1965, it connects to Rimini, Riccione, Cattolica, Pesaro, Ancona, Civitanova Marche, San Benedetto del Tronto, Pescara, Vasto, Termoli, Foggia and Bari.

== History ==
The first part of the A14 opened to traffic was Bologna–Forlì (73 km) in 1966. The A14 reached the Rimini Sud junction on 13 August 1966; Riccione on 15 May 1968; and Cattolica on 22 July 1968.

In 1969, it reached Ancona, and the approximately 50-km section in Abruzzo was also opened. In 1973 the motorway was completed from Bologna to Bari (absorbing parts of A17), as well as the spur towards Ravenna. The final extension towards Taranto was opened in 1975.

== Route ==
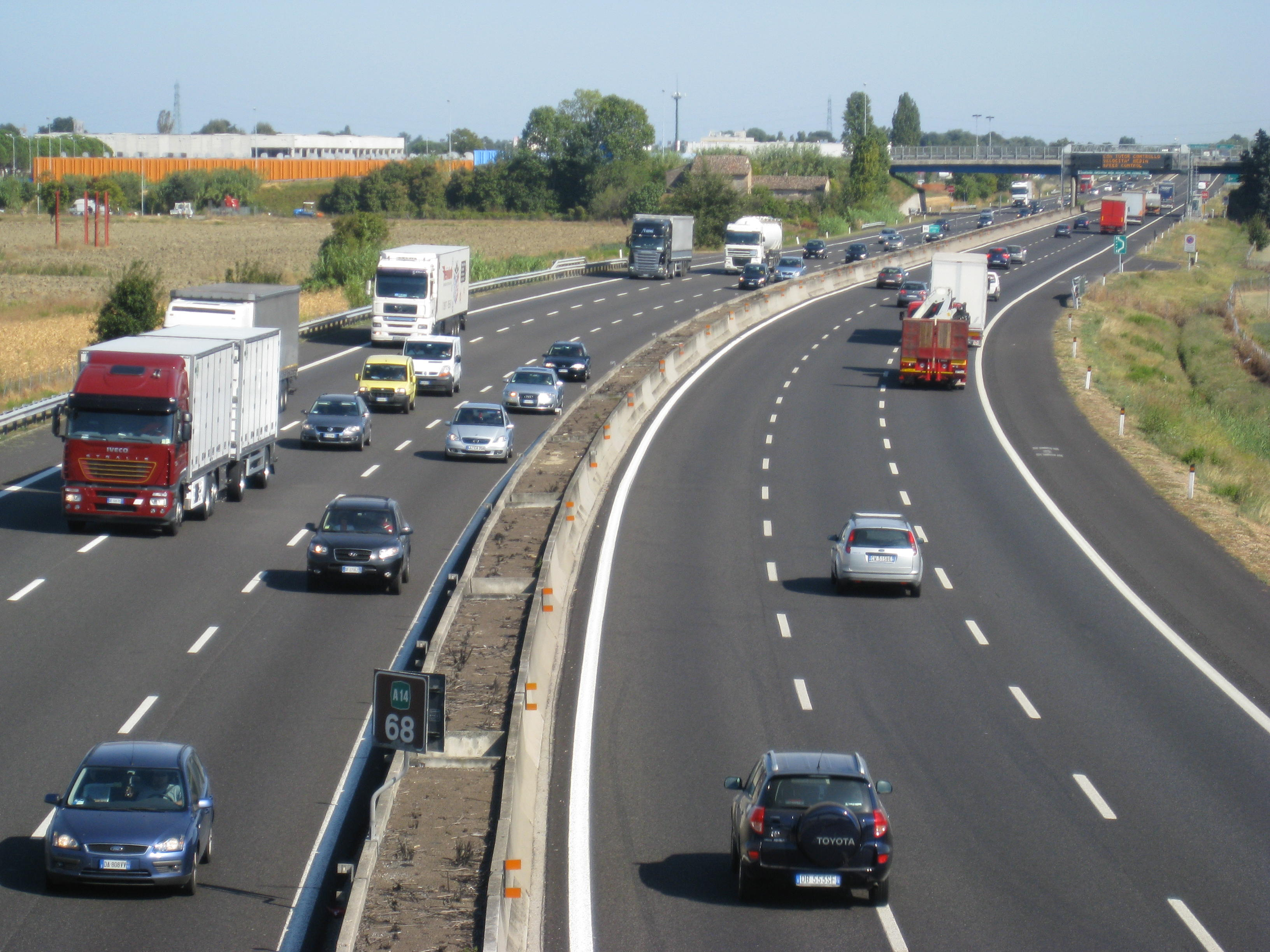
Autostrada A14 near Forlì

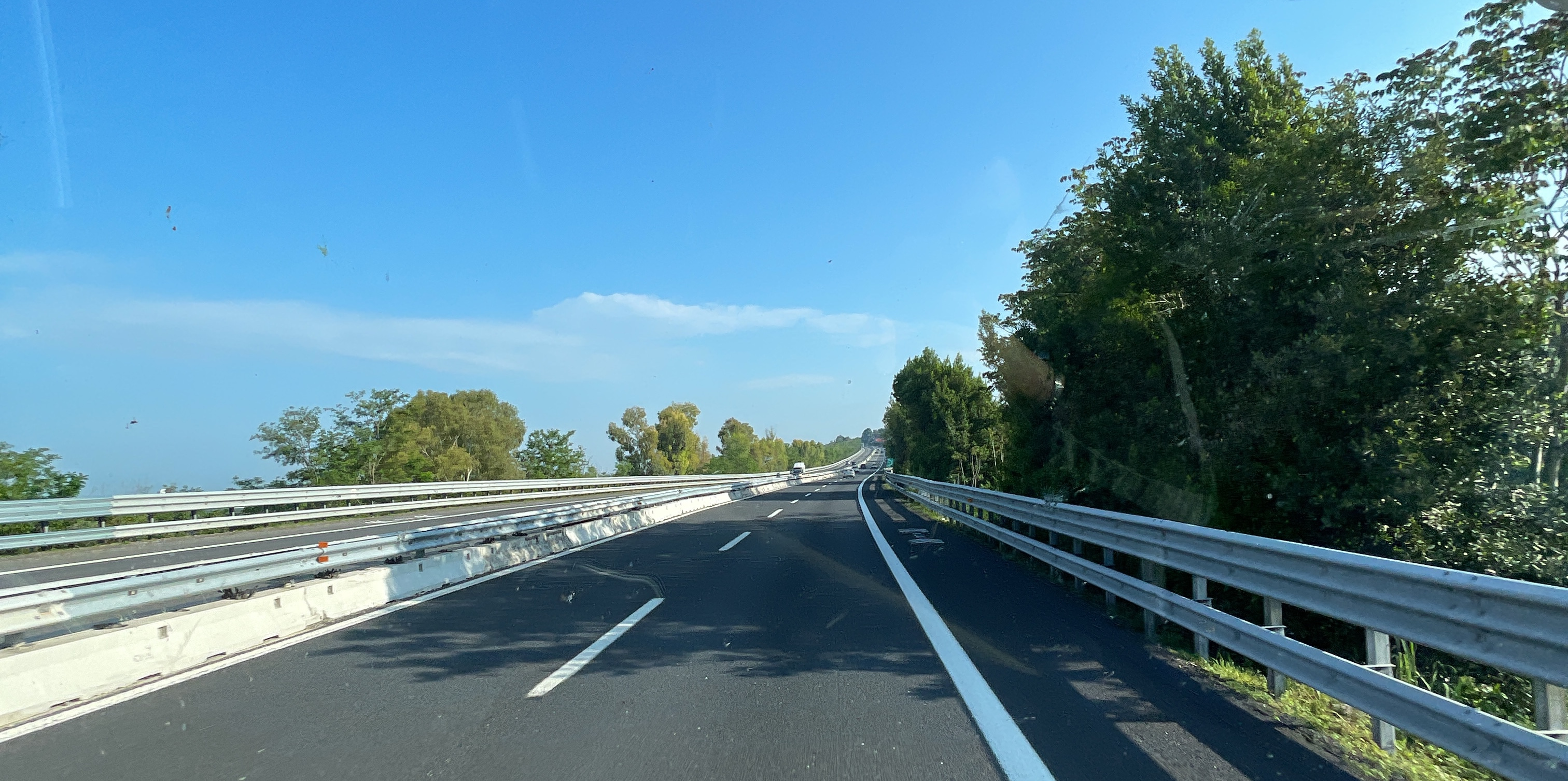
Autostrada A14 near Ascoli Piceno

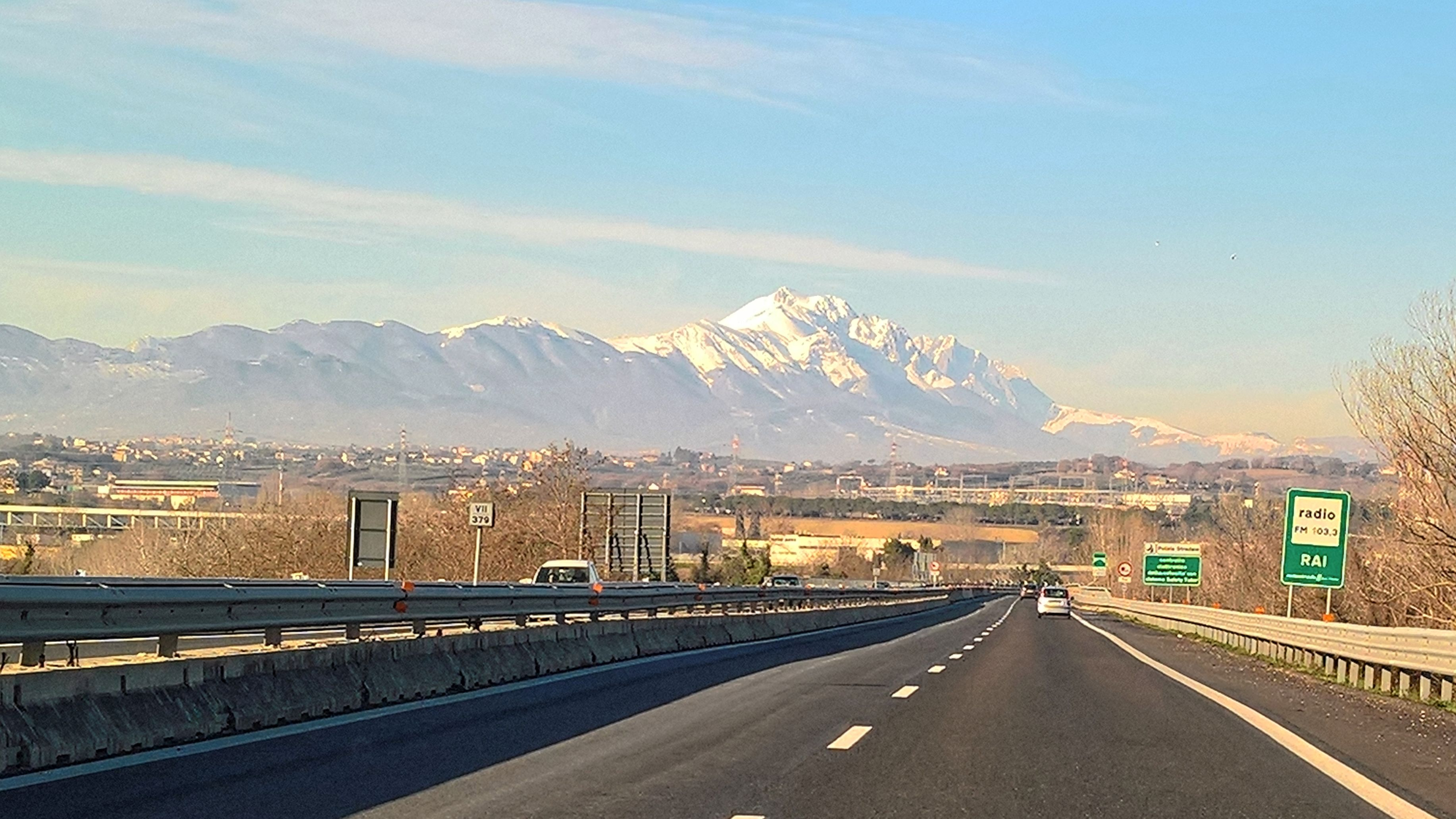
Autostrada A14 near Pescara

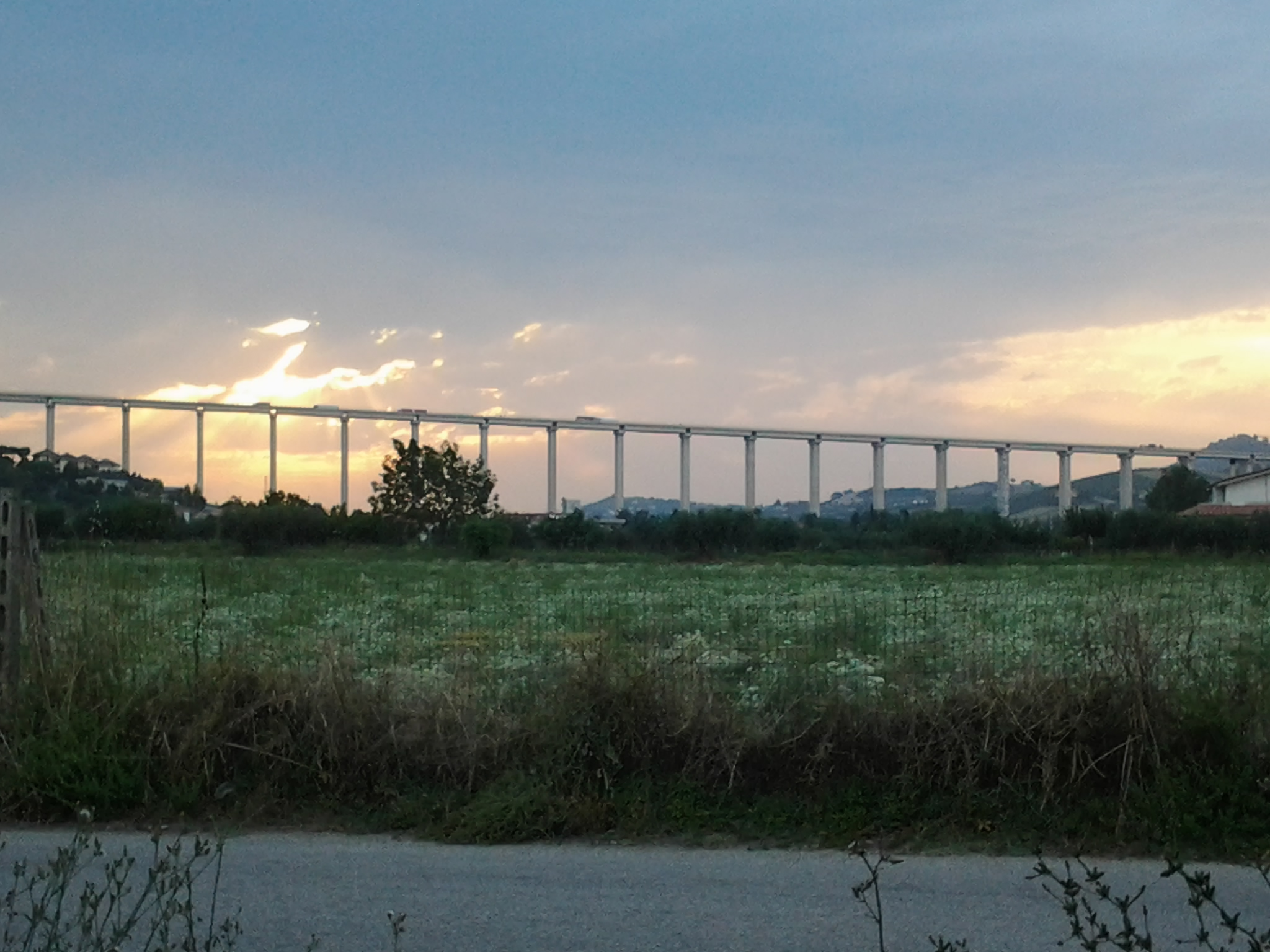
Autostrada A14 near Tortoreto

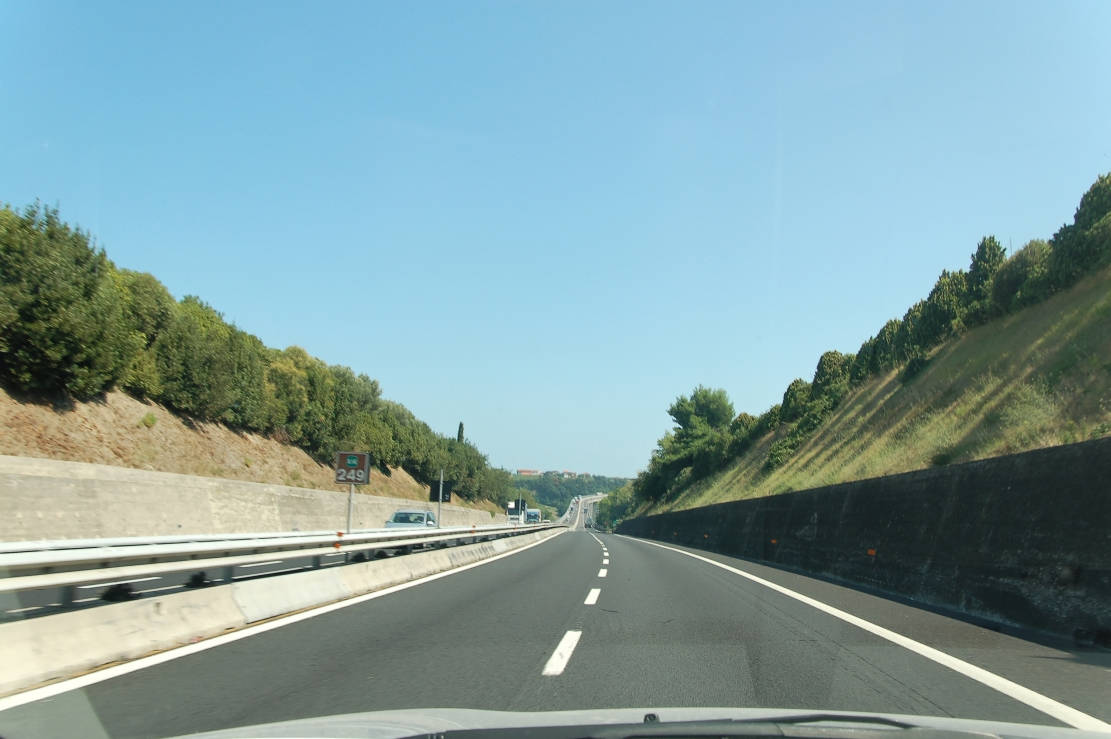
Autostrada A14 near Ortona

BOLOGNA – TARANTO; Autostrada Adriatica
Exit	↓km↓	↑km↑	Province	European route
Milano	0.0 km (0 mi)	743.4 km (461.9 mi)	BO	E45
Rest area "La Pioppa"	2.3 km (1.4 mi)	741.1 km (460.5 mi)	BO	E45
Bologna Borgo Panigale	4.8 km (3.0 mi)	738.6 km (458.9 mi)	BO	E45
Ramo Casalecchio - Bologna Casalecchio; Tangenziale di Bologna; Bologna Guglielmo Marconi Airport; Firenze	8.5 km (5.3 mi)	734.9 km (456.6 mi)	BO	E45
Padova	14.3 km (8.9 mi)	729.1 km (453.0 mi)	BO	E45
Bologna Fiera	15.5 km (9.6 mi)	727.9 km (452.3 mi)	BO	E45
Bologna San Lazzaro; Tangenziale di Bologna	22.2 km (13.8 mi)	721.2 km (448.1 mi)	BO	E45
Rest area "Sillaro"	37.5 km (23.3 mi)	705.9 km (438.6 mi)	BO	E45
Castel San Pietro Terme	38.1 km (23.7 mi)	705.3 km (438.3 mi)	BO	E45
Imola	50.1 km (31.1 mi)	693.3 km (430.8 mi)	BO	E45
Ravenna; Romea Venezia	56.7 km (35.2 mi)	686.7 km (426.7 mi)	RA	E45
Rest area "Santerno"	59.5 km (37.0 mi)	683.9 km (425.0 mi)	RA	E45
Faenza	64.5 km (40.1 mi)	678.9 km (421.8 mi)	RA	E45
Forlì; Castrocaro Terme	81.6 km (50.7 mi)	661.8 km (411.2 mi)	FC	E45
Rest area "Bevano"	89.5 km (55.6 mi)	653.9 km (406.3 mi)	FC	E45
Cesena nord Tiberina Sansepolcro - Perugia - Terni; Umbro-Laziale Orte - Viterbo - Roma	93.6 km (58.2 mi)	649.8 km (403.8 mi)	FC	E55
Cesena	99.7 km (62.0 mi)	643.7 km (400.0 mi)	FC	E55
Valle del Rubicone	110.1 km (68.4 mi)	631.3 km (392.3 mi)	FC	E55
Rest area "Rubicone"	111.3 km (69.2 mi)	630.1 km (391.5 mi)	FC	E55
Rimini nord - Bellaria - Santarcangelo	117.3 km (72.9 mi)	626.1 km (389.0 mi)	RN	E55
Rimini sud	127.4 km (79.2 mi)	616.0 km (382.8 mi)	RN	E55
Rest area "Montefeltro"	133.5 km (83.0 mi)	609.9 km (379.0 mi)	RN	E55
Riccione	135.4 km (84.1 mi)	608.0 km (377.8 mi)	RN	E55
Cattolica - San Giovanni in Marignano - Gabicce	143.9 km (89.4 mi)	599.5 km (372.5 mi)	RN	E55
Pesaro - Urbino	155.9 km (96.9 mi)	587.5 km (365.1 mi)	PU	E55
Rest area "Foglia"	158.9 km (98.7 mi)	584.5 km (363.2 mi)	PU	E55
Fano di Bocca Trabaria Fossombrone - Sansepolcro - Arezzo	173.3 km (107.7 mi)	570.1 km (354.2 mi)	PU	E55
Marotta - Mondolfo	184.9 km (114.9 mi)	558.5 km (347.0 mi)	PU	E55
Rest area "Metauro"	186.2 km (115.7 mi)	557.2 km (346.2 mi)	PU	E55
Senigallia; Spiaggia di Velluto	194.5 km (120.9 mi)	548.9 km (341.1 mi)	AN	E55
Montemarciano	207.9 km (129.2 mi)	535.3 km (332.6 mi)	AN	E55
Rest area "Esino"	208.7 km (129.7 mi)	534.7 km (332.2 mi)	AN	E55
Ancona nord Ancona Falconara Airport della Val d'Esino - Frasassi Caves - Fabriano - Gubbio - Perugia; Ferries to Zadar and Split (Croatia) - Patras (Greece)	213.5 km (132.7 mi)	529.9 km (329.3 mi)	AN	E55
Ancona sud - OsimoCastelfidardo; Riviera del Conero	230.4 km (143.2 mi)	513.0 km (318.8 mi)	AN	E55
Rest area "Conero"	239.0 km (148.5 mi)	504.4 km (313.4 mi)	AN	E55
Loreto - Porto Recanati; Basilica della Santa Casa - Recanati	245.5 km (152.5 mi)	497.9 km (309.4 mi)	AN	E55
Civitanova Marche - Macerata della Val di Chienti Tolentino - Foligno; Flaminia Spoleto - Terni; Centrale Umbra Assisi - Perugia - Valdichiana	262.6 km (163.2 mi)	480.8 km (298.8 mi)	MC	E55
Porto Sant'Elpidio	270.8 km (168.3 mi)	472.6 km (293.7 mi)	FM	E55
Rest area "Chienti"	263.9 km (164.0 mi)	479.5 km (297.9 mi)	FM	E55
Fermo - Porto San Giorgio	280.0 km (174.0 mi)	463.4 km (287.9 mi)	FM	E55
Pedaso	288.0 km (179.0 mi)	455.4 km (283.0 mi)	FM	E55
Rest area "Piceno"	290.8 km (180.7 mi)	452.6 km (281.2 mi)	FM	E55
Grottammare; Riviera delle Palme	302.0 km (187.7 mi)	441.4 km (274.3 mi)	AP	E55
Ascoli Piceno - San Benedetto del Tronto; Ascoli Piceno; Salaria Rieti - Roma; Monti Sibillini National Park - Norcia - Cascia - Spoleto	311.7 km (193.7 mi)	431.7 km (268.2 mi)	AP	E55
Val Vibrata	319.5 km (198.5 mi)	423.9 km (263.4 mi)	TE	E55
Rest area "Tortoreto"	323.6 km (201.1 mi)	419.8 km (260.9 mi)	TE	E55
Teramo - Giulianova - Mosciano Sant'Angelo; Teramo; L'Aquila - Roma	334.4 km (207.8 mi)	409.0 km (254.1 mi)	TE	E55
Rest area "Vomano"	340.3 km (211.5 mi)	403.1 km (250.5 mi)	TE	E55
Roseto; Gran Sasso e Monti della Laga National Park - Castelli	344.0 km (213.8 mi)	399.4 km (248.2 mi)	TE	E55
Atri - Pineto	351.8 km (218.6 mi)	391.6 km (243.3 mi)	TE	E55
Rest area "Torre Cerrano"	363.1 km (225.6 mi)	380.3 km (236.3 mi)	TE	E55
Pescara nord - Città Sant'Angelo; Montesilvano	364.5 km (226.5 mi)	378.9 km (235.4 mi)	PE	E55
Sulmona - Avezzano; L'Aquila - Roma	365.0 km (226.8 mi)	377.4 km (234.5 mi)	PE	E55
Pescara ovest - Chieti; Via Tiburtina Valeria Sulmona; Chieti scalo - Pescara centro Pescara Airport; Ferries to Split e Hvar (Croatia)	380.8 km (236.6 mi)	362.6 km (225.3 mi)	CH	E55
Pescara sud - Francavilla al Mare; Maiella National Park	392.6 km (244.0 mi)	350.8 km (218.0 mi)	CH	E55
Rest area "Alento"	393.9 km (244.8 mi)	349.5 km (217.2 mi)	CH	E55
Ortona	404.6 km (251.4 mi)	338.8 km (210.5 mi)	CH	E55
Lanciano; Trabocchi Coast	413.8 km (257.1 mi)	329.6 km (204.8 mi)	CH	E55
Val di Sangro di Fondovalle del Sangro Casoli - Castel di Sangro - Agnone; Ski facilities of Roccaraso	422.0 km (262.2 mi)	321.4 km (199.7 mi)	CH	E55
Rest area "Sangro"	428.8 km (266.4 mi)	314.6 km (195.5 mi)	CH	E55
Casalbordino - Vasto nord	437.3 km (271.7 mi)	306.1 km (190.2 mi)	CH	E55
Montenero di Bisaccia - Vasto sud - San Salvo; Istonia Cupello - Castiglione Messer Marino - Agnone di Fondovalle del Trigno Trivento - Isernia	454.6 km (282.5 mi)	288.8 km (179.5 mi)	CB	E55
Rest area "Trigno"	458.6 km (285.0 mi)	284.8 km (177.0 mi)	CB	E55
Rest area "Rio Vivo"	473.6 km (294.3 mi)	269.8 km (167.6 mi)	CB	E55
Termoli di Fondovalle del Biferno Larino - Campobasso - Campomarino - Guglionesi; Ferries to Tremiti Islands	477.0 km (296.4 mi)	266.4 km (165.5 mi)	CB	E55
Rest area "Torre Fantine"	493.5 km (306.6 mi)	249.9 km (155.3 mi)	FG	E55
Poggio Imperiale; Lesina; Lake Lesina and Lake Varano; Gargano National Park; Peschici	507.0 km (315.0 mi)	236.4 km (146.9 mi)	FG	E55
Rest area "San Trifone"	517.5 km (321.6 mi)	225.9 km (140.4 mi)	FG	E55
San Severo di San Giovanni Rotondo San Giovanni Rotondo - Monte Sant'Angelo	528.6 km (328.5 mi)	214.8 km (133.5 mi)	FG	E55
Rest area "Gargano Est"	542.2 km (336.9 mi)	201.2 km (125.0 mi)	FG	E55
Foggia dell'Appennino Abruzzese Lucera - Campobasso; Garganica Manfredonia - Vieste delle Puglie Ariano Irpino; Bradanica Candela - Melfi	554.1 km (344.3 mi)	189.3 km (117.6 mi)	FG	E55
Foggia industrial area	584.8 km (363.4 mi)	158.6 km (98.5 mi)	FG	E55
Rest area "Le Saline"	587.3 km (364.9 mi)	156.1 km (97.0 mi)	FG	E55
Cerignola est	589.2 km (366.1 mi)	154.2 km (95.8 mi)	FG	E55
Napoli - Benevento - Avellino	602.7 km (374.5 mi)	140.7 km (87.4 mi)	FG	E55
Canosa; Cannae	610.5 km (379.3 mi)	132.9 km (82.6 mi)	BT	E55
Rest area "Canne della Battaglia"	620.4 km (385.5 mi)	123.0 km (76.4 mi)	BT	E55
Andria - Barletta; Ferries to Durrës (Albania); Castel del Monte	626.9 km (389.5 mi)	116.5 km (72.4 mi)	BT	E55
Trani ex di Altamura Corato - Gravina - Altamura di Matera - Matera	638.1 km (396.5 mi)	105.3 km (65.4 mi)	BT	E55
Rest area "Dolmen di Bisceglie"	644.4 km (400.4 mi)	99.0 km (61.5 mi)	BT	E55
Molfetta	652.4 km (405.4 mi)	91.0 km (56.5 mi)	BA	E55
Bitonto; Bari Palese Airport	663.0 km (412.0 mi)	80.4 km (50.0 mi)	BA	E55
Rest area "Murge"	671.4 km (417.2 mi)	72.0 km (44.7 mi)	BA	E55
Bari nord Raccordo - Tangenziale di Bari; Adriatica Brindisi - Lecce - Otranto; Barese Gravina - Altamura di Matera Matera; Ferries to Dubrovnik (Croatia), Igoumenitsa and Patras (Greece) (Note: Only entering the northbound carriageway and only exiting the southbound carriageway)	672.2 km (417.7 mi)	71.2 km (44.2 mi)	BA	E843
Bari sud Stadio San Nicola (Note: Only exit for Bari on the northbound carriageway)	677.8 km (421.2 mi)	65.6 km (40.8 mi)	BA	E843
Acquaviva delle Fonti	698.4 km (434.0 mi)	45.0 km (28.0 mi)	BA	E843
Rest area "Le Fonti est"	701.4 km (435.8 mi)	42.0 km (26.1 mi)	BA	E843
Gioia del Colle; Gioia del Colle Air Base; Alberobello - Itria Valley	709.6 km (440.9 mi)	33.8 km (21.0 mi)	BA	E843
Mottola - Castellaneta	723.9 km (449.8 mi)	19.5 km (12.1 mi)	TA	E843
Toll gate Taranto nord	735.2 km (456.8 mi)	8.2 km (5.1 mi)	TA	E843
Palagianello; Via Appia Matera - Taranto; Jonica Sibari - Catanzaro - Reggio Calabria (Note: Exit only towards Taranto, entry only towards Bologna.)	736.4 km (457.6 mi)	7.0 km (4.3 mi)	TA	E843
Taranto nord Via Appia - Massafra - Taranto - Lecce di Gioia del Colle Mottola - Gioia del Colle - Bari; Jonica Metaponto - Sibari - Reggio Calabria	743.4 km (461.9 mi)	0.0 km (0 mi)	TA	E843

=== A14 Ravenna connection ===
DIRAMAZIONE RAVENNA; A14 Ravenna connection
Exit	↓km↓	↑km↑	Province	European route
Bologna - Taranto	0.0 km (0 mi)	29.8 km (18.5 mi)	RA	--
Toll gate Ravenna	9.3 km (5.8 mi)	20.5 km (12.7 mi)	RA	--
Cotignola	9.8 km (6.1 mi)	20.0 km (12.4 mi)	RA	--
Lugo	9.9 km (6.2 mi)	19.8 km (12.3 mi)	RA	--
Bagnacavallo	13.9 km (8.6 mi)	15.9 km (9.9 mi)	RA	--
Rest area "Sant'Eufemia"	19.9 km (12.4 mi)	9.9 km (6.2 mi)	RA	--
Fornace Zarattini; San Vitale	26.5 km (16.5 mi)	3.3 km (2.1 mi)	RA	--
Adriatica Ravenna - Alfonsine	29.7 km (18.5 mi)	0.1 km (0.062 mi)	RA	--
dir Romea Port of Ravenna	29.8 km (18.5 mi)	0.0 km (0 mi)	RA	--

=== A14-Bari ring road connection ===
RACCORDO A14-TANGENZIALE DI BARI; A14-Bari ring road connection
Exit	↓km↓	↑km↑	Province	European route
Bologna; Napoli	0.0 km (0 mi)	4.6 km (2.9 mi)	BA	E55
Toll gate Bari nord	0.1 km (0.062 mi)	4.5 km (2.8 mi)	BA	E55
Bari industrial area Barese - Altamura - Gravina, Potenza di Matera - Matera	0.4 km (0.25 mi)	4.2 km (2.6 mi)	BA	E55
Modugno	1.4 km (0.87 mi)	3.2 km (2.0 mi)	BA	E55
Tangenziale di Bari; Adriatica - Brindisi - Lecce - Foggia; Taranto - di Gioia del Colle - Taranto	4.6 km (2.9 mi)	0.0 km (0 mi)	BA	E55

=== Casalecchio connection ===
RAMO CASALECCHIO; Casalecchio connection
Exit	↓km↓	↑km↑	Province	European route
Milano - Firenze	0.0 km (0 mi)	5.5 km (3.4 mi)	BO	--
Bologna Casalecchio; Tangenziale di Bologna	1.0 km (0.62 mi)	4.5 km (2.8 mi)	BO	--
Ancona; Padova	5.5 km (3.4 mi)	0.0 km (0 mi)	BO	--

== See also ==
- Autostrade of Italy
- Roads in Italy
- Transport in Italy

=== Other Italian roads ===
- State highways (Italy)
- Regional road (Italy)
- Provincial road (Italy)
- Municipal road (Italy)
