= European route E843 =

Road in trans-European E-road network

E843

Route information
- Length: 96 km (60 mi)

Major junctions
- From: Bari
- To: Taranto

Location
- Countries: Italy

Highway system
- International E-road network; A Class; B Class

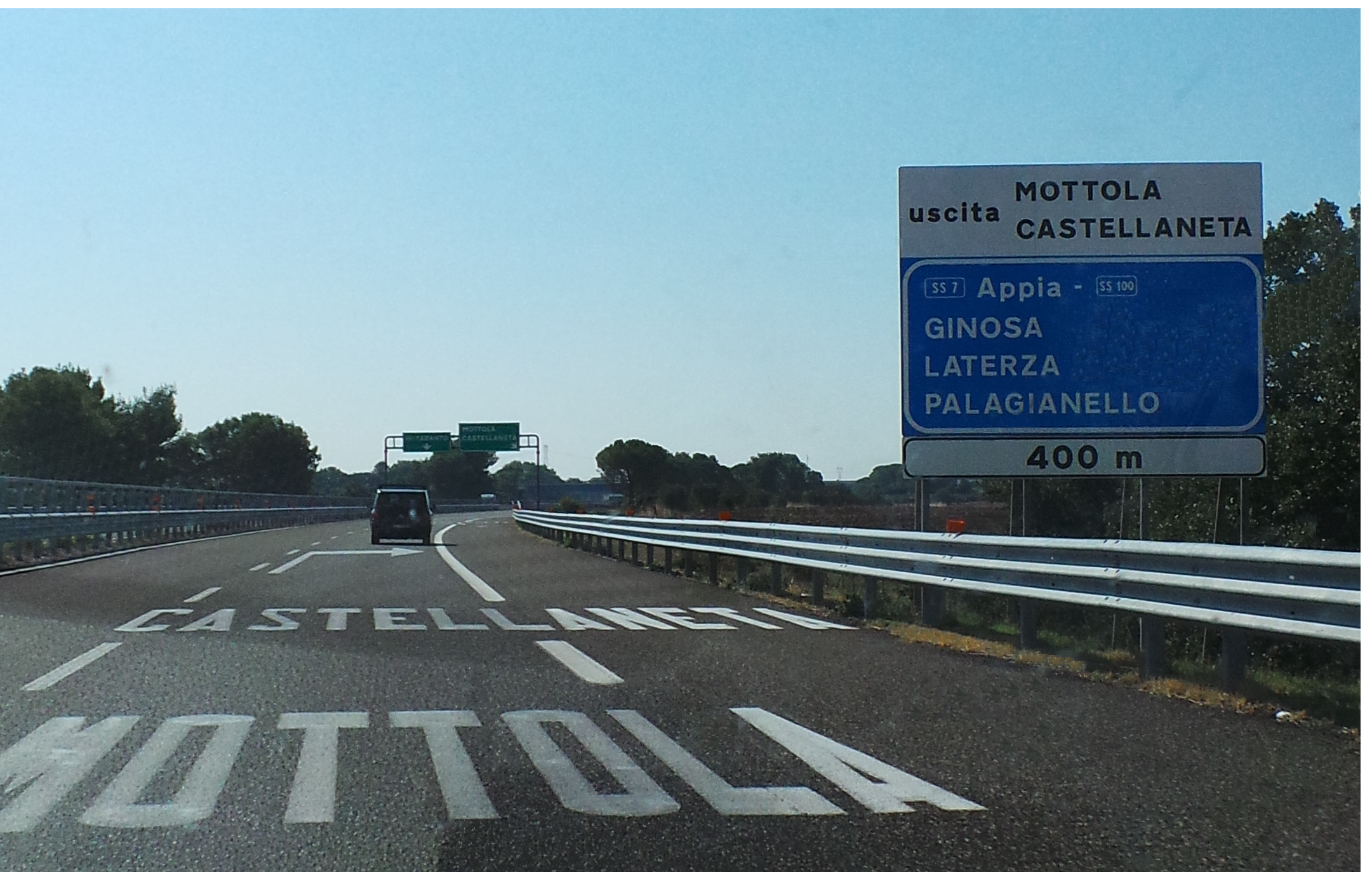
European route 843 near Mottola.

European route E 843 is a European B class road in Italy, connecting the cities Bari – Taranto.

== Route ==
- Italy
  - E55 Bari
  - E90 Taranto
