= Bologna Guglielmo Marconi Airport =

International airport in Bologna, Italy

Bologna Guglielmo Marconi Airport Aeroporto di Bologna-Guglielmo Marconi

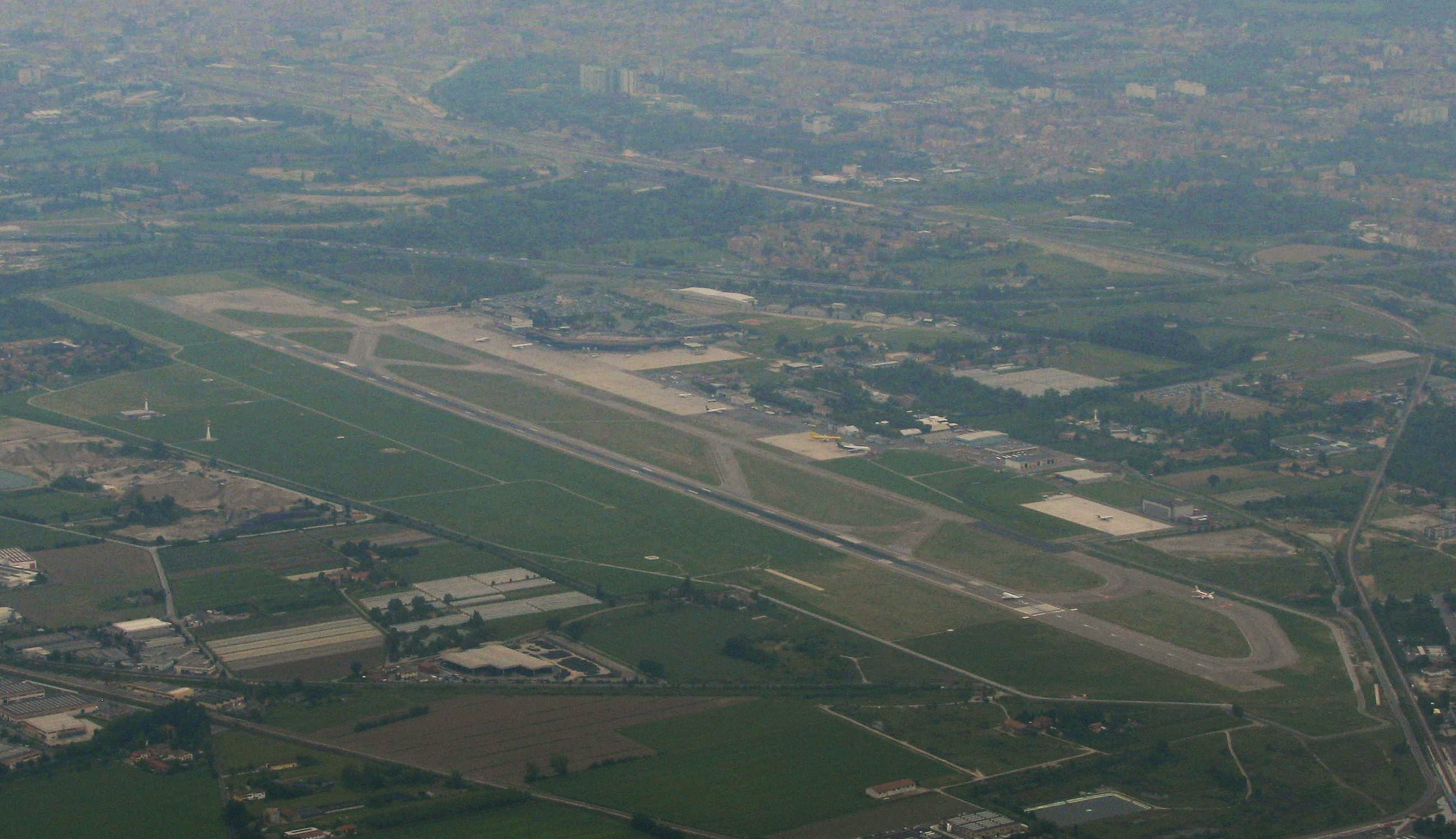
- IATA: BLQ; ICAO: LIPE

Summary
- Airport type: Public
- Operator: Aeroporto di Bologna S.p.A.
- Serves: Bologna, Italy
- Hub for: Ryanair; Neos
- Elevation AMSL: 123 ft (37 m)
- Coordinates: 44°32′07.6″N 11°17′19.2″E
- Website: www.bologna-airport.it

Map
- Location of the airport in Italy BLQ (Italy)

Runways
Direction	Length		Surface
Direction	ft	m	Surface
12/30	9,196	2,800	Asphalt

Statistics (2024)
- Passengers: 10,775,972
- Passenger change 23–24: ▲8.1%
- Aircraft movements: 83,264
- Movements change 23–24: ▲5.9%
- Cargo (tons): 56,371
- Cargo change 23–24: ▲10.5%
- Source: Assaeroporti

Bologna Guglielmo Marconi Airport (Italian: Aeroporto di Bologna-Guglielmo Marconi) (IATA: BLQ, ICAO: LIPE) is an international airport serving the city of Bologna in Italy. It is approximately 6 km (3.7 mi) northwest of the city centre in the Emilia-Romagna region of Italy. The airport is named after Bologna native Guglielmo Marconi (1874–1937), an Italian electrical engineer and Nobel laureate.

== History ==
The original Bologna airport was opened in 1933 some 500 metres to the west of the present building. This airport was used until the 1970s, by which time it had become impractically small for passenger numbers and was replaced by the present airport.

In June 2005, Eurofly began a nonstop flight from Bologna to New York City. It operated the route on a seasonal basis with Airbus A330s. The link lasted until 2008. In June 2019, American Airlines introduced seasonal service to Philadelphia on a Boeing 767. Given Bologna's proximity to Tuscany, the company anticipated that tourists bound for the region would take the flight. However, it had difficulty attracting them and discontinued the route in September 2019.

== Facilities ==
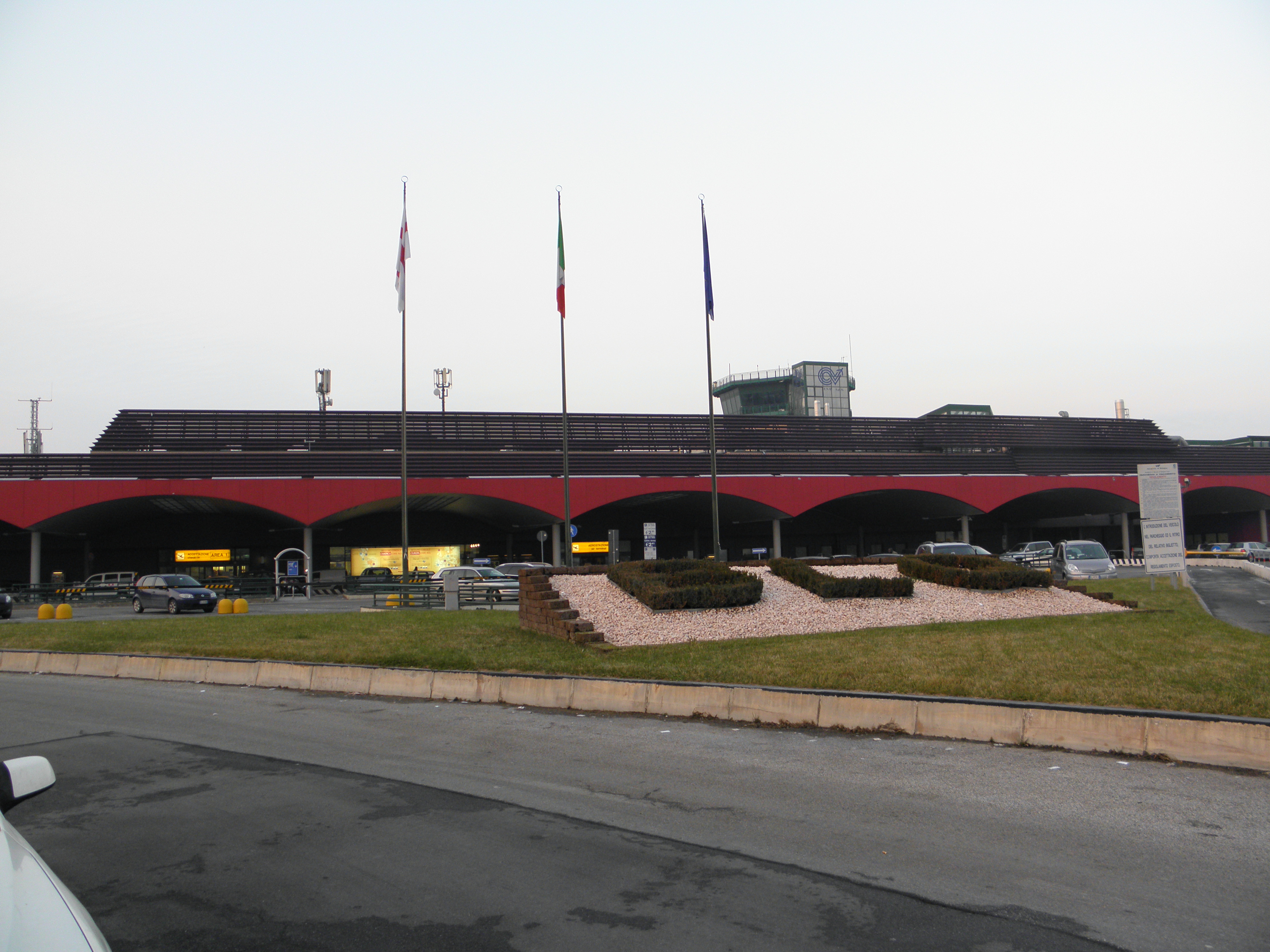
Terminal building

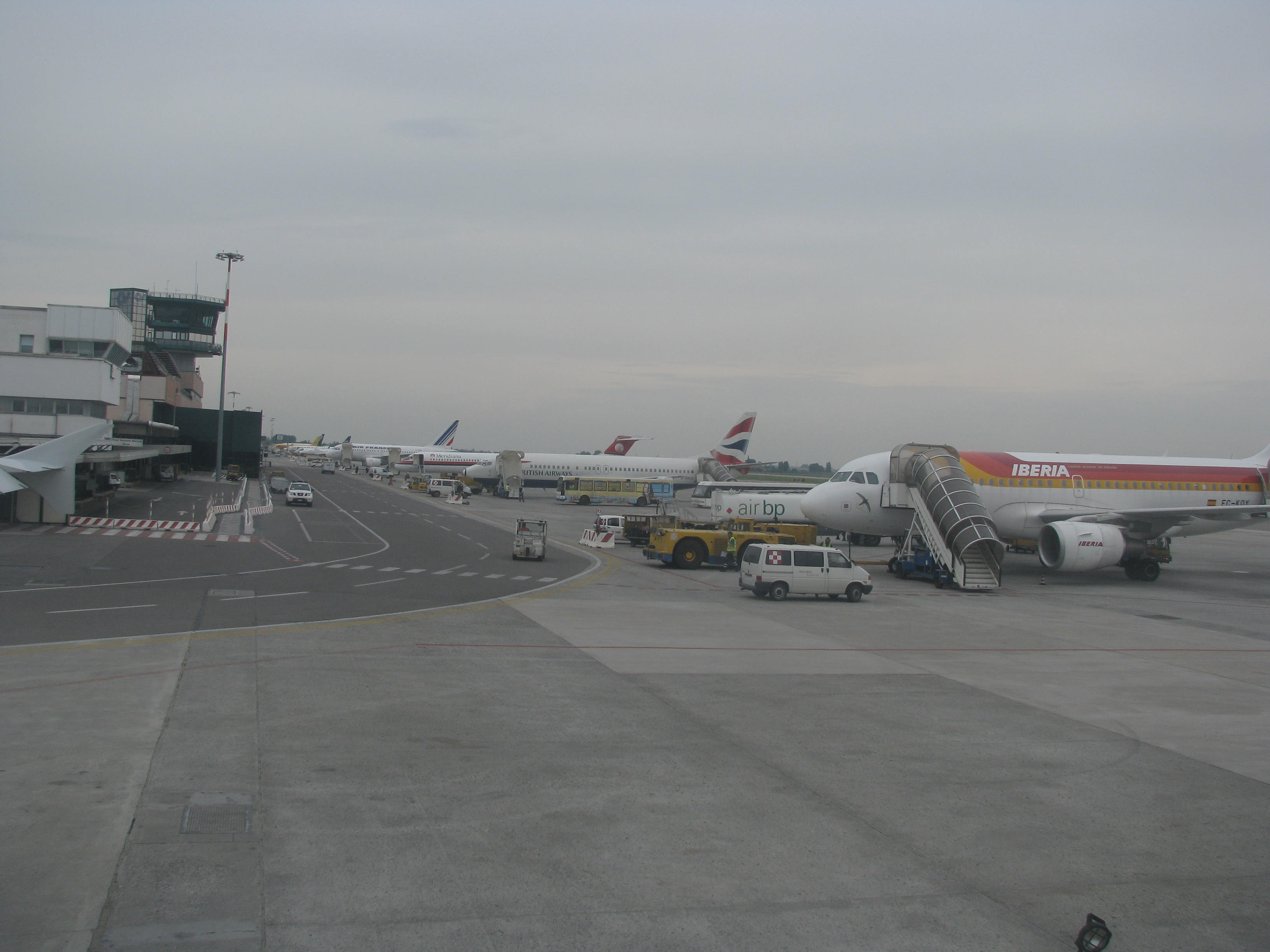
Main apron

=== Terminal ===
There is one terminal, which underwent an expansion during 2011–2013. It now has a total area of 36,100 m^{2} (389,000 ft^{2}), of which 5,500 m^{2} (59,000 ft^{2}) is shopping areas. A new baggage handling system was installed and there are now 24 departure gates, all are bus gates since there are not yet any jetways at the airport.

=== Runway ===
Bologna airport has one runway, 12/30, made of asphalt; its dimensions are 2,800 by 45 metres (9,186 by 148 ft).

== Airlines and destinations ==
The following airlines operate regular scheduled and charter flights at Bologna Airport:

Airlines	Destinations
Aegean Airlines	Athens
AeroItalia	Seasonal: Cagliari, Comiso
Air Arabia Maroc	Casablanca
Air Cairo	Cairo, Luxor, Sharm El Sheikh
Air Dolomiti	Munich; Seasonal: Frankfurt
Air France	Paris–Charles de Gaulle
Air Nostrum	Seasonal charter: Palma de Mallorca
Air Serbia	Belgrade
Austrian Airlines	Vienna
British Airways	London–Heathrow
Bluebird Airways	Tel Aviv
Brussels Airlines	Brussels
Dan Air	Seasonal: Bacău
Emirates	Dubai–International
Eurowings	Berlin, Cologne/Bonn, Düsseldorf
Finnair	Seasonal: Helsinki
FlyOne	Chișinău
Georgian Airways	Tbilisi
HiSky	Chișinău
Iberia	Madrid
Israir	Tel Aviv
ITA Airways	Rome–Fiumicino
KLM	Amsterdam
LOT Polish Airlines	Warsaw–Chopin
Lufthansa	Frankfurt
Luxair	Luxembourg
Neos	Marsa Alam, Sharm El Sheikh, Tenerife–South; Seasonal: Cagliari, Fuerteventura, Heraklion, Ibiza, Karpathos, Kos, Menorca, Mykonos, Olbia, Rhodes
Norwegian Air Shuttle	Seasonal: Copenhagen, Oslo
Nouvelair	Tunis
Pegasus Airlines	Istanbul–Sabiha Gökçen
Royal Air Maroc	Casablanca
Ryanair	Alghero, Athens, Barcelona, Bari, Beauvais, Brindisi, Bucharest–Otopeni, Budapest, Cagliari, Catania, Charleroi, Cologne/Bonn, Copenhagen, Crotone, Dublin, Edinburgh, Eindhoven, Fès, Fuerteventura, Gran Canaria, Kraków, Lamezia Terme, Lanzarote, Lisbon, London–Luton, London–Stansted, Madrid, Málaga, Malta, Manchester, Marseille, Olbia, Palermo, Porto, Reggio Calabria, Santander, Seville, Sofia, Stockholm–Arlanda, Tenerife–South,Tirana, Trapani, Valencia, Vienna, Warsaw–Chopin, Wrocław; Seasonal: Alicante, Berlin, Castellón, Chania, Corfu, Heraklion, Ibiza, Kos, Menorca, Mykonos, Palma de Mallorca, Prague, Preveza/Lefkada Rhodes, Thessaloniki, Zadar
Scandinavian Airlines	Copenhagen; Seasonal: Stockholm–Arlanda
Swiss International Air Lines	Zurich
TAP Air Portugal	Lisbon
Transavia	Seasonal: Eindhoven
TUI fly Belgium	Marrakech
TUS Airways	Tel Aviv
Tunisair	Tunis
Turkish Airlines	Istanbul
Twin Jet	Lyon
Volotea	Seasonal: Olbia
Vueling	Barcelona
Wizz Air	Bucharest–Otopeni, Catania, Chișinău, Cluj-Napoca, Craiova, Iași, Kraków, Skopje, Palermo, Suceava, Timișoara, Tirana, Warsaw–Chopin

== Statistics ==
Passenger numbers at Bologna-Borgo Panigale
Year	Passengers Handled	Change %	Aircraft Movements	Change %	Cargo (tonnes)	Change %
2000	3,524,789	▲6.1%	61,909	▲2.0%	25,034	▲2.3%
2001	3,440,051	▼ −2.2%	56,746	▼ −0.8%	26,197	▲4.7%
2002	3,414,475	▼ −0.7%	54,956	▼ −3.2%	24,959	▼ −4.7%
2003	3,562,010	▲4.3%	56,738	▲3.2%	28,211	▲13.0%
2004	2,908,271	▼ −18.4%	44,804	▼ −21.0%	21,106	▼ −25.2%
2005	3,690,953	▲26.9%	54,157	▲20.9%	25,469	▲20.7%
2006	4,001,436	▲8.4%	63,585	▲17.4%	32,465	▲27.5%
2007	4,361,951	▲9.0%	66,698	▲4.9%	18,700	▼ −42.4%
2008	4,225,446	▼ −3.1%	62,042	▼ −7.0%	26,497	▲41.7%
2009	4,782,284	▲13.2%	64,925	▲4.7%	27,329	▲3.1%
2010	5,511,669	▲15.3%	70,269	▲8.2%	37,800	▲38.3%
2011	5,885,884	▲6.8%	69,153	▼ −1.6%	43,788	▲15.8%
2012	5,958,648	▲1.2%	67,529	▼ −2.4%	40,645	▼ −7.2%
2013	6,193,783	▲4.0%	65,392	▼ −3.2%	44,150	▲8.6%
2014	6,580,481	▲6.2%	65,058	▼ −0.5%	41,789	▼ −5.4%
2015	6,889,742	▲4.7%	64,571	▼ −0.7%	40,999	▼ −1.9%
2016	7,680,992	▲11.5%	69,697	▲7.9%	47,709	▲16.4%
2017	8,198,156	▲6.7%	71,878	▲3.1%	56,132	▲11.8%
2018	8,506,658	▲3.8%	71,503	▼ −0.2%	52,681	▼6.1%
2019	9,405,920	▲10.6%	77,126	▲7.9%	48,832	▼ −7.3%
2020	3,833,063	▼ −72.3%	30,139	▼ −60.9%	43,378	▼ −11.2%
2021	4,103,816	▲63.7%	42,477	▲40.9%	50,121	▲15.5%
2022	8,496,000	▲107%	70,871	▲66.8%	55,194	▲10.1%
2023	9,970,284	▲17.4%	78,658	▲11%	50,994	▼ −7.6%
2024	10,775,972	▲8.1%	83,264	▲5.9%	56,371	▲10.5%
2025	11,138,013	▲3.4%	84,658	▲1.7%	53,720	▲4.7%
2026 (Jan-Sep)	8,813,662	▲3.2%	66,494	▲2.6%	41,225	▲3.4%

Domestic destinations by passenger traffic (2025)
Position	City	Passengers
1	Catania, Sicily	597.627
2	Palermo, Sicily	333.406
3	Cagliari, Sardinia	268.484
4	Brindisi, Apulia	257.729

International destinations by passenger traffic (2025)
Position	City	Passengers
1	Tirana, Albania	506.206
2	Barcelona, Spain	453.310
3	Paris, France (Charles de Gaulle)	321.045
4	Istanbul, Turkey	316,297
5	Madrid, Spain	304.104
6	Bucharest, Romania	295.099
7	London, United Kingdom (Heathrow)	275.986
8	Amsterdam, Netherlands	248.519
9	Frankfurt, Germany	232.729
10	Casablanca, Morocco	218.055

== Ground transportation ==
=== By monorail ===
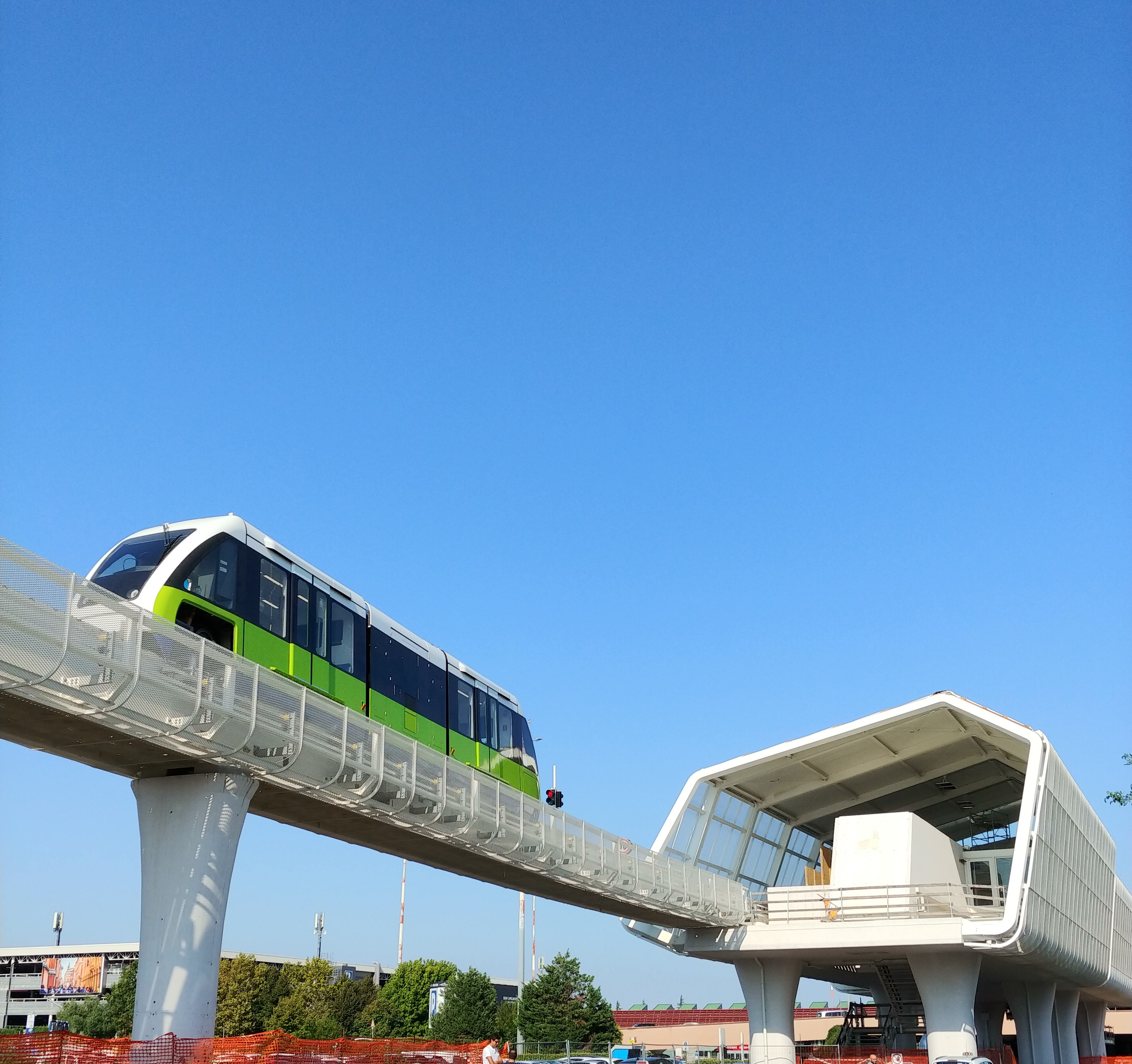
Marconi Express monorail

The airport is about 5 kilometres (3 mi) from Bologna Centrale railway station. Opened in 2020, the Marconi Express monorail connects the airport to Bologna Centrale railway station with a travel time of approximately 7.5 minutes.

=== By car ===
Motorways:

- A1 from Milan
- A13 from Padova
- A14 from Ancona

=== By bus ===
A shuttle bus service, route Aerobus (BLQ), used to run between the station and the airport before the advent of Marconi Express. In case of events at the Bologna Fiere trade fair venue, BLQ operated a direct connection between the Airport and the bus terminus Fiera Viale Aldo Moro. Route BLQ has been withdrawn as of 18 November 2020, with the introduction of the Marconi Express.

The only TPER bus connections available to and from the airport are routes 54, between the Airport and Borgo Panigale; and 944, between the Airport and the Maggiore Hospital, calling at Via della Birra, Via del Triumvirato, Pontelungo, and Santa Viola. Route 944 is extended to Bologna Centrale railway station in its last two departures at 00.15 and 00.45, while its first two departures from the railway station are at 5.20 and 5.30; due to the people mover being yet to begin service.

From the nearby Via della Birra and Via del Triumvirato, it is possible to board suburban routes (also operated by TPER), 81, 81A, 91 and 91A to Longara, Padulle, Bagno di Piano and Calderara di Reno.

The airport has daily direct bus connections with Ferrara, Florence, Modena, Cervia, Ravenna, and Rimini, and three times a week with Ascoli Piceno.

=== By train ===
The nearest railway station is Calderara-Bargellino railway station, about 4 kilometres (2.5 mi) from the airport. However, there is no public transport connection between the two. Passengers coming by rail are expected to change for the Monorail at Bologna Central Station.

== See also ==
- List of the busiest airports in Italy
- List of airports in Italy
