= Autostrade of Italy =

National motorway system of Italy

Map of the autostrade of Italy

The autostrade (Italian: [ˌautosˈtraːde]; sing.: autostrada, [ˌautosˈtraːda]) are roads forming the Italian national system of motorways. The total length of the system is about 7,016 kilometres (4,360 mi), as of 30 July 2022. There are also 13 motorway spur routes, which extend for 355 kilometres (221 mi).

Most of the Italian motorways have two lanes per direction/carriageway, but 1,870.2 kilometres (1,162.1 mi) of the Italian motorway network have three lanes per direction/carriageway, 129 kilometres (80 mi) have four lanes per carriageway, and only 1.8 kilometres (1.1 mi) have five lanes per carriageway. The density is of 22.4 kilometres (13.9 mi) of motorway for every 1,000 square kilometres (390 sq mi) of Italian territory.

Italy was the first country in the world to build motorways reserved for fast traffic and motor vehicles only. The Autostrada dei Laghi ('Lakes Motorway'), the first built in the world, connecting Milan to Lake Como and Lake Maggiore, and now forms the A8 and A9 motorways, was devised by Piero Puricelli and inaugurated in 1924.

In northern and central Italy and in the southern regions of Campania and Apulia, the autostrade mainly consist of tollways managed by Autostrade per l'Italia, a holding company controlled by Cassa Depositi e Prestiti. Other operators include ASTM, ATP, and Autostrade Lombarde in the north-west; Autostrada del Brennero, A4 Holding, Concessioni Autostradali Venete, and Autovie Venete in the north-east; Strada dei Parchi, SALT, SAT, and Autocisa in the center; and CAS in Sicily.

On Italian motorways, the toll applies to almost all motorways not managed by Anas. There are two types of toll systems used on the autostrade: the "closed motorway system" (toll based on the kilometres travelled) or the "open motorway system" (flat-rate toll). Since a motorway could be managed by numerous operators, the toll is only requested when exiting the motorway and not when the motorway operator changes. This system was made possible following Article 14 of Law 531 of 12 August 1982.

== History ==
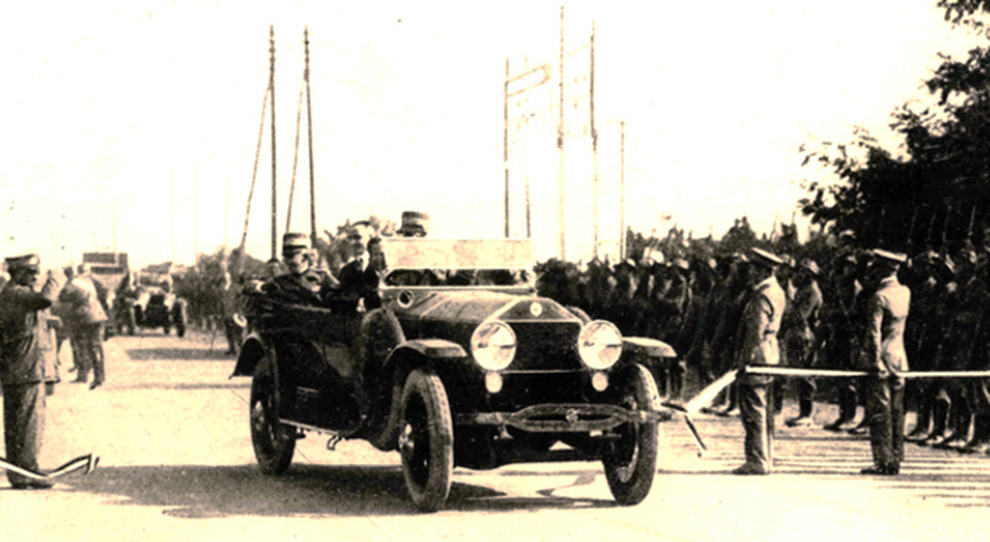
The King Victor Emmanuel III of Italy inaugurated the Autostrada dei Laghi ('Lakes Motorway'; now parts of the Autostrada A8 and Autostrada A9), the first motorway built in the world, on 21 September 1924, aboard the royal Lancia Trikappa

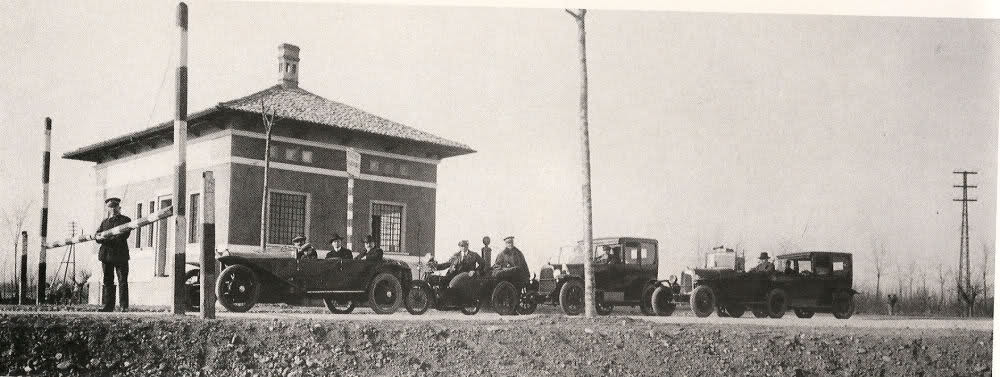
Toll gate of the Autostrada dei Laghi ('Lakes Motorway') in Milan in 1924

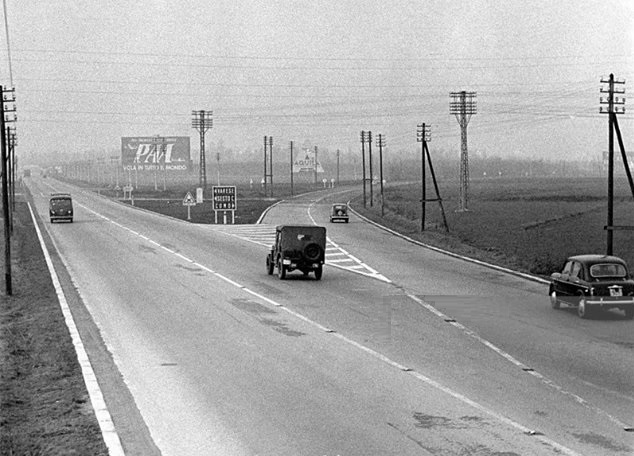
Autostrada dei Laghi ('Lakes Motorway') in the 1950s

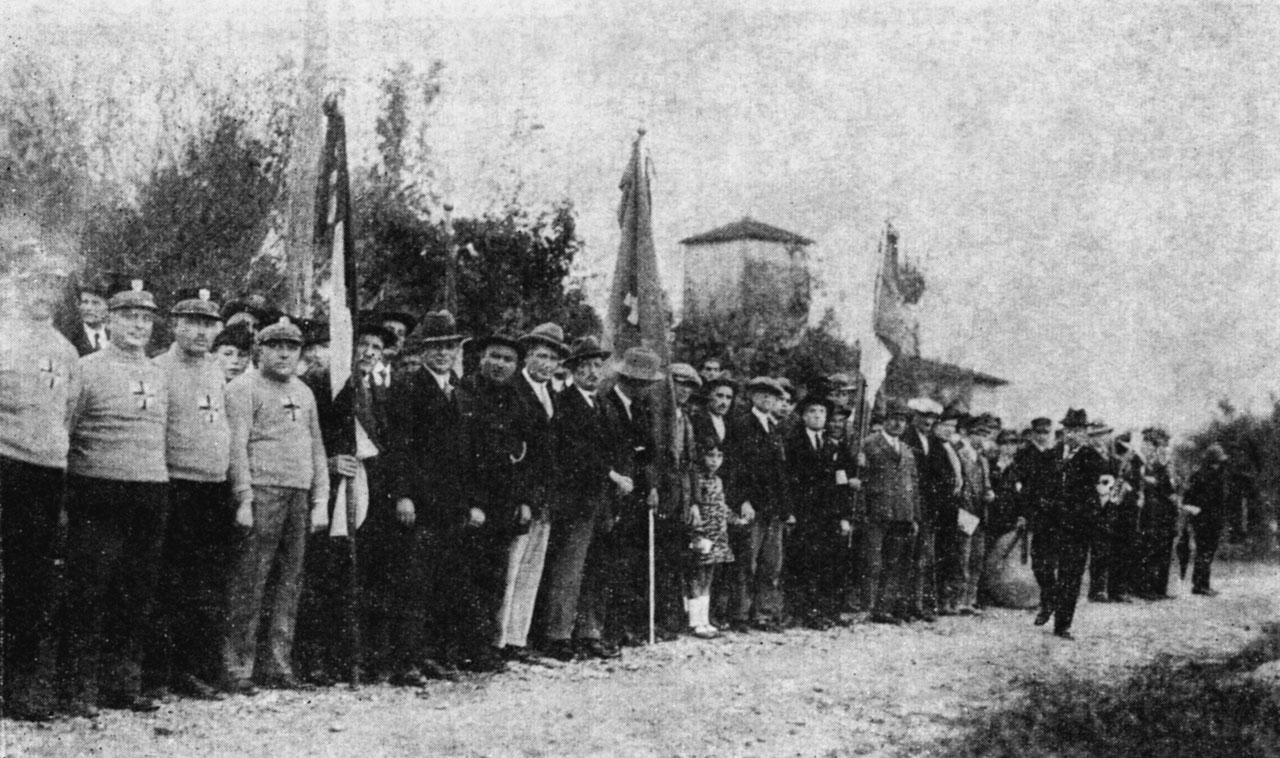
Foundation stone laying ceremony for the Florence-Mare motorway (the current Autostrada A11) in 1927

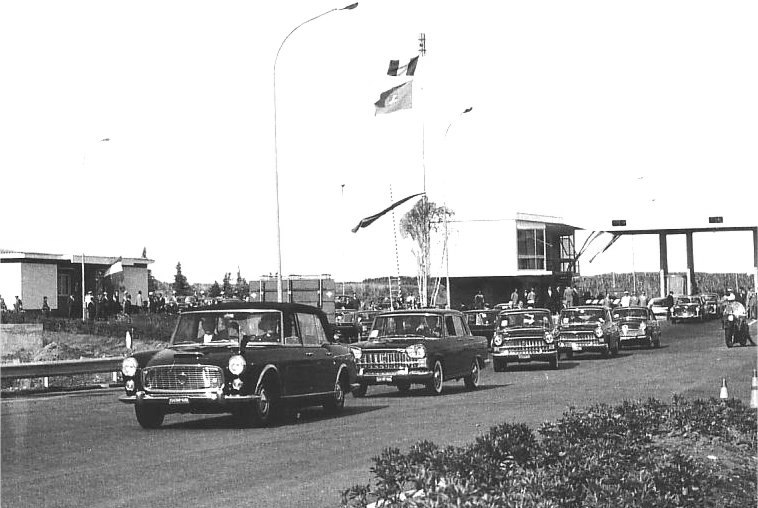
The President of Italy Antonio Segni inaugurated the Autostrada del Sole ('Sun Motorway'; now called Autostrada A1), on 4 October 1964, aboard the presidential Lancia Flaminia.

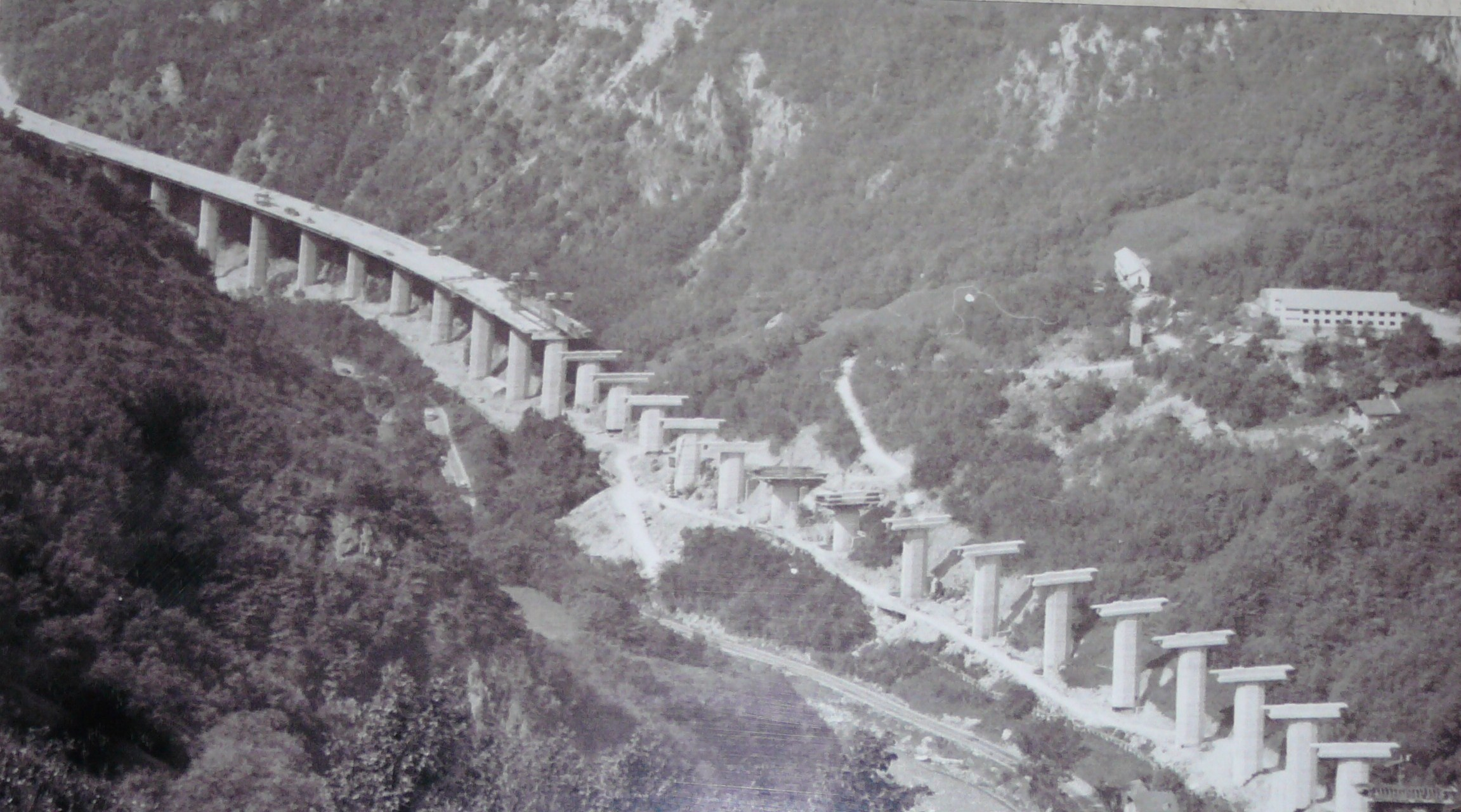
The construction of one of the many viaducts of the Autostrada A22 ("Brenner motorway") in the 1970s

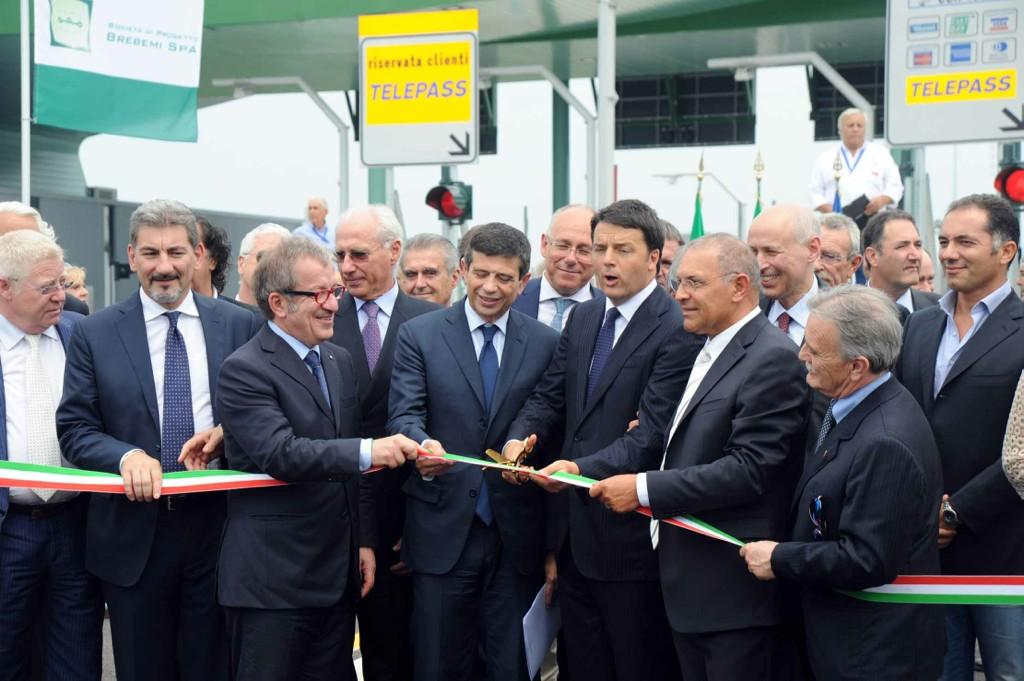
Inauguration ceremony of the Autostrada A35 on 23 July 2014

The term autostrada was used for the first time in an official document from 1922 in which the engineer Piero Puricelli presented the project for the Autostrada dei Laghi ('Lakes Motorway'); with that term, it indicated those roads characterized by a straight path (as far as possible), without obstacles, characterized by a high achievable speed, passable only by motor vehicles (Italian: autoveicoli, hence the name) aimed at the rapid transport of goods and people.

Italy was the first country in the world to build motorways reserved for fast traffic and for motor vehicles only. The Autostrada dei Laghi ('Lakes Motorway'), the first built in the world, connecting Milan to Lake Como and Lake Maggiore, and now parts of the Autostrada A8 and Autostrada A9, was devised by Piero Puricelli and was inaugurated in 1924. Piero Puricelli, a civil engineer and entrepreneur, received the first authorization to build a public-utility fast road in 1921, and completed the construction (one lane in each direction) between 1924 and 1926. Piero Puricelli decided to cover the expenses by introducing a toll.

It was a futuristic project, because there were few cars in circulation in Italy at that time. In 1923 there were a total of 53,000 cars circulating on Italian roads (between 1928 and 1929 there was a significant increase, as they went from 142,000 cars in circulation to 173,000 respectively). In 1927 there were 135,900 cars circulating in Italy, corresponding to one vehicle for every 230 inhabitants, while today the ratio is 1 car for every 1.6 inhabitants. The most motorized Italian regions were those of northern Italy and central Italy, with Lombardy at the top of the list with over 38,700 cars in 1923, while at the bottom of the list was Basilicata with 502 cars. Milan was the Italian city in which the most car licenses were issued annually (12,000 in 1928), while the Italian region where the fewest licenses were issued was Sardinia, with only 632 new licenses.

In 1927 the Milan-Bergamo motorway was opened (part of the current Autostrada A4) whose concessionary company was owned by Piero Puricelli. In 1929 the Naples-Pompei motorway (part of the current Autostrada A3) was inaugurated, while in 1931 the Brescia-Bergamo motorway (part of the current Autostrada A4) was inaugurated. In 1932 the Turin-Milan motorway (part of the current Autostrada A4) was opened. In 1933 the Florence-Mare motorway (the current Autostrada A11) and the Padua-Venice motorway (part of the current Autostrada A4) were opened. In 1935, after 3 years of work, the Genoa-Serravalle Scrivia (the current Autostrada A7) was opened. However, the first regulatory definition dates back only to 1933 with Royal Decree no. 1740 of 1933 which defined autostrade as roads reserved for motor vehicles only. In 1939, a year before Italy entered into the World War II, the construction of the Genoa-Savona motorway (the current Autostrada A10) was approved.

Legislative decree 17 April 1948, n. 547 defines motorways "as those communication routes reserved for paid transit of motor vehicles, built and operated by the A.N.A.S. or by private individuals, with or without State contributions". In 1955 the Romita law was promulgated which provided that the motorway network must be present in all regions, work began on the Genoa-Savona and the doubling of single carriageway motorways began with financing law no. 1328/1955. The law of 7 February 1961, n. 59 defines motorways "as those communication routes exclusively reserved for the selected transit, usually for a fee, of motor vehicles and motorbikes, without level crossings or in any case unattended, which are recognized as such by decree of the Minister for Public Works".

In 1961, by Law 24 July 1961 n. 729, the construction of the Adriatica (Autostrada A14), Naples-Canosa (Autostrada A16) and Caserta-Salerno (Autostrada A30) motorways was approved. The same law provided for the construction of motorway junctions. Also in the 1960s, the first automatic pay stations were introduced for paying tolls only with coins. In 1964, the Autostrada A1 Milan-Rome was completed, the first dual carriageway motorway in the world with sections also in the mountains. In 1973 the first motorway in Sicily (the Autostrada A18) was inaugurated. In the 1970s the Grande Raccordo Anulare was classified as a motorway.

In 1975, law 492 was promulgated (in force until the 1990s) which provides for the blocking of motorway construction due to the oil crisis. Since 1981, toll tickets with mechanical perforation have been replaced with tickets with a magnetic stripe. Meanwhile, construction work continues on the motorways already under construction, which had not been affected by law 492. In 1984 the Viacard began to spread, followed in the following years by the Telepass introduced in 1990.

In 1997 work began on the modernization of the Salerno-Reggio Calabria motorway. Completed in 2017, it was then renamed Autostrada A2, to replace the old name which then remained only for the Naples-Salerno section. In 2001, with the doubling of the Autostrada A6, all motorways in Italy are dual carriageways. In 2009 the Mestre bypass was opened (classified as Autostrada A4). Between 2014 and 2015, the Autostrada A35, Autostrada A36, Autostrada A58, Autostrada A59, and Autostrada A60 motorways were opened. In March 2022, the 3-lane section of the Autostrada A1 southbound between Barberino di Mugello and Calenzano was opened, which—although not officially—constitutes the natural continuation of the Variante di Valico; in this stretch the Santa Lucia tunnel is crossed which, at 7.724 kilometres (4.799 mi), is the longest 3-lane tunnel in Europe.

== Characteristics ==
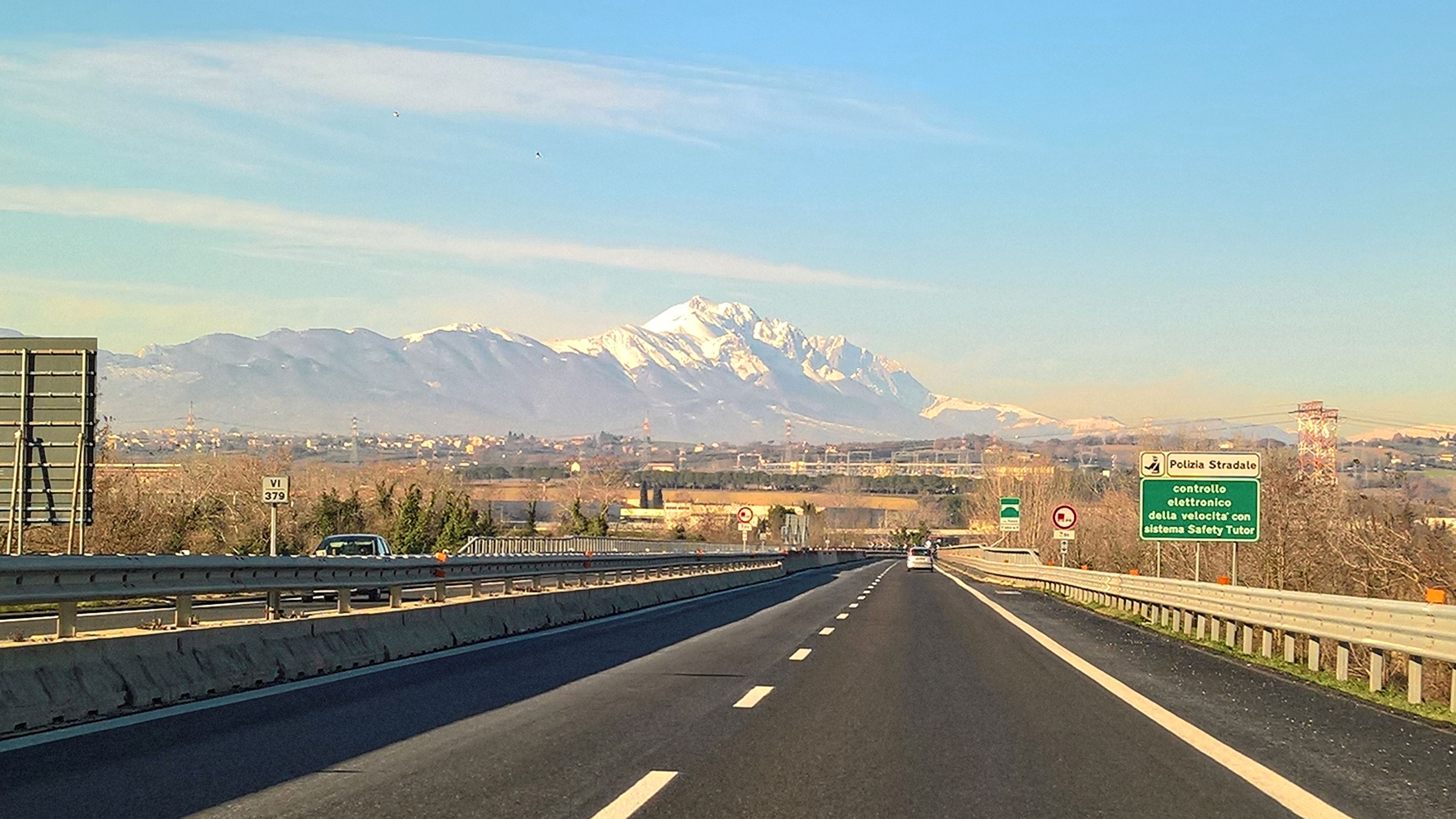
Autostrada A14

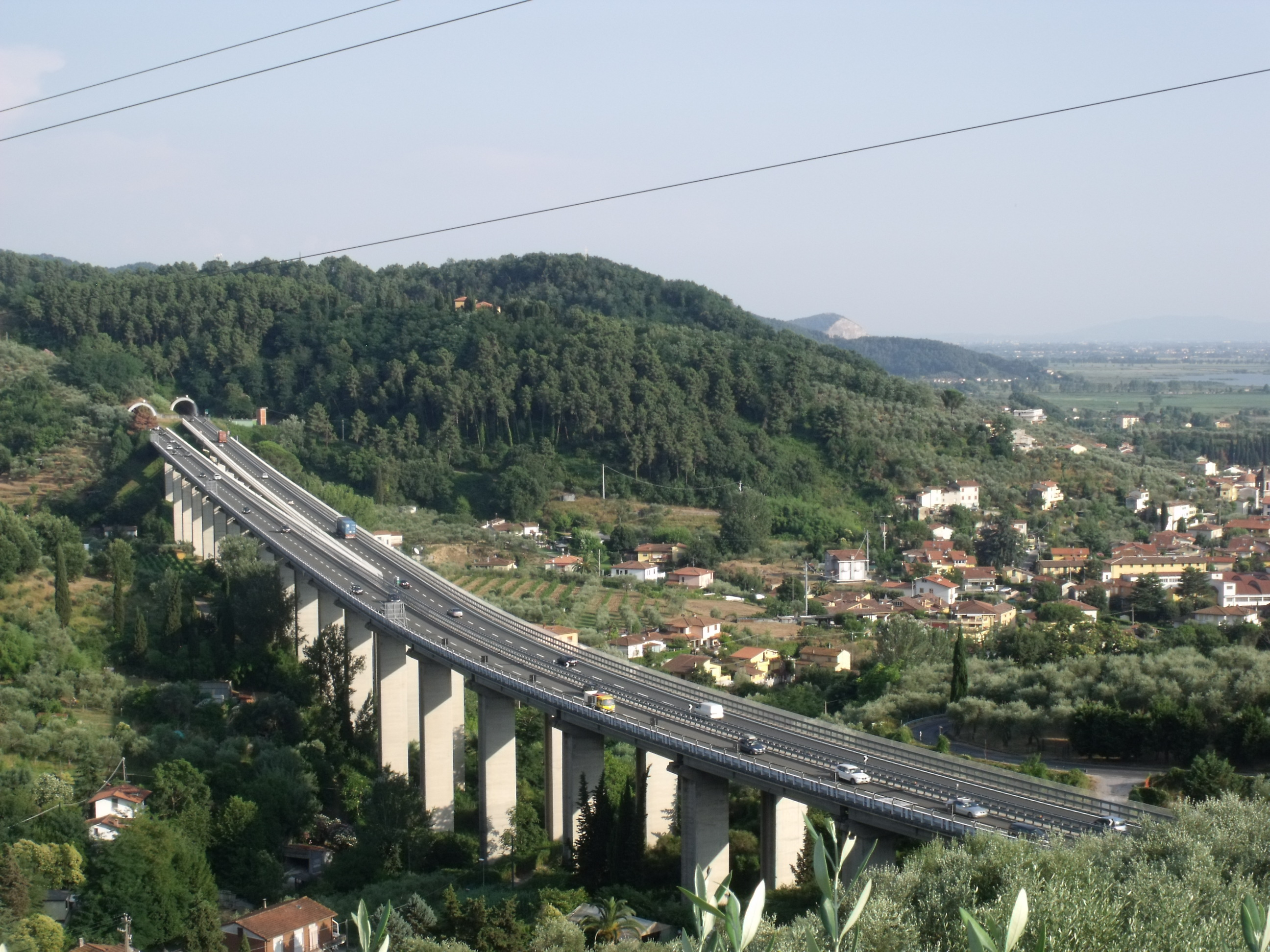
Autostrada A11

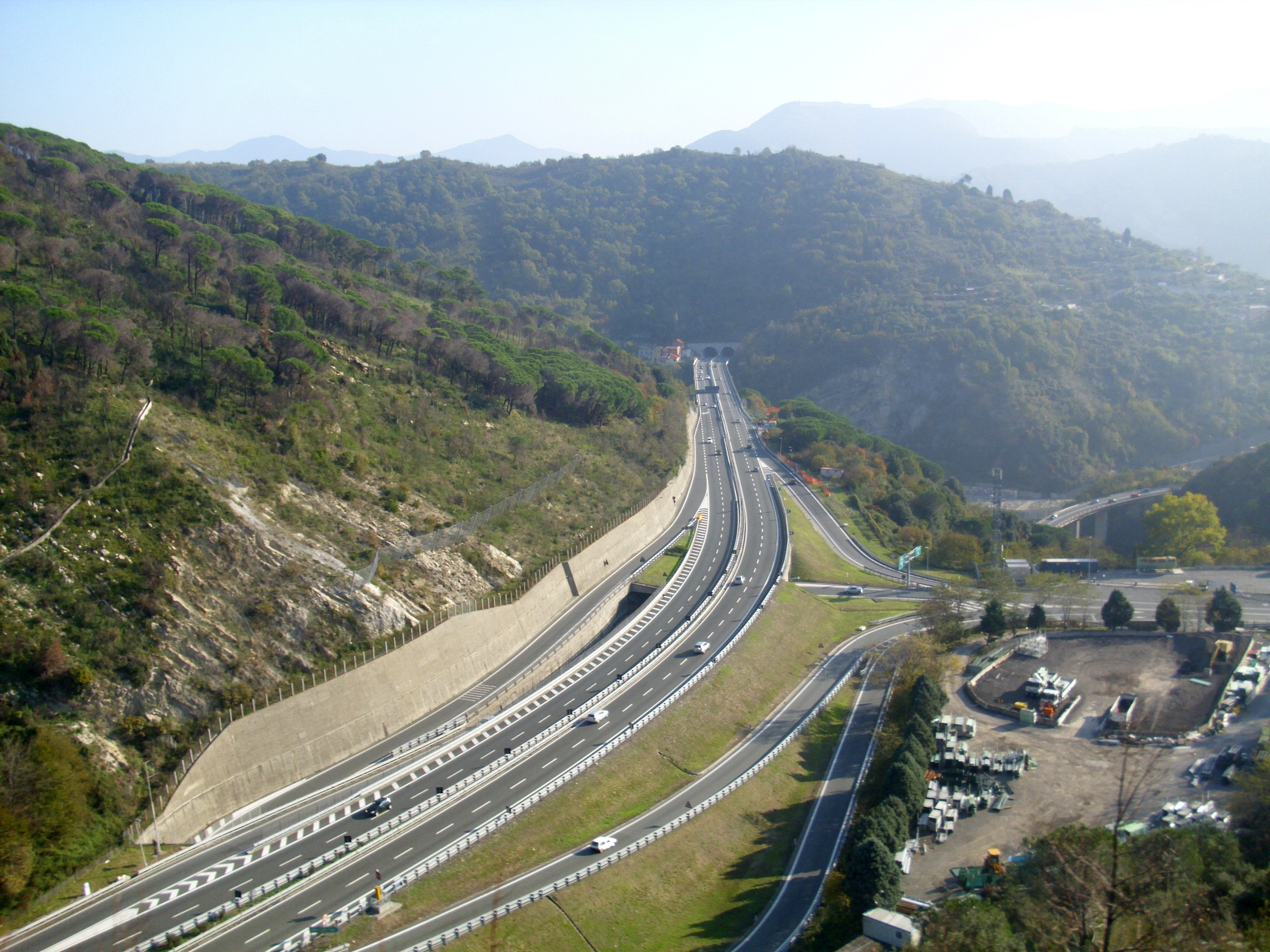
Autostrada A12

In order for a road to be classified as a motorway, various geometric and construction conditions must be satisfied and these, although very similar in basis (for example the width of the travel lanes must be 3.75 metres (12.3 ft)) are not constant: there are different technical-legal regulations for motorways built in urban or extra-urban areas.

The Italian traffic code defines the motorway as follows:

extra-urban or urban road with independent carriageways or separated by an impassable traffic island, each with at least two lanes, possible paved shoulder on the left and emergency lane or paved shoulder on the right, without at-grade intersections and private accesses, equipped with a fence and user assistance systems along the entire route, reserved for the circulation of certain categories of motor vehicles and characterized by specific start and end signs; must be equipped with special rest areas and parking areas, both with accesses equipped with deceleration and acceleration lanes.

— Art. 2 Italian traffic code

These characteristics, however, may not be respected (for example in the application of the dynamic lane) by virtue of the exceptions provided for by the Italian traffic code itself:

when particular local, environmental, landscape, archaeological and economic conditions do not allow adaptation, provided that road safety is ensured and pollution is in any case avoided.

— Art. 13 paragraph 2 Italian traffic code

In the event that, [...], particular local, environmental, landscape, archaeological and economic conditions do not allow full compliance with these regulations, different design solutions may be adopted provided that they are supported by specific safety analyses and subject to the favourable opinion of the Superior Council of Public Works for motorways, main extra-urban roads and urban thoroughfares, and of the Regional Authority for Public Works for other roads.

— Art. 3 "Functional rules for the construction of roads provided for by the Italian traffic code"

In any case, some standards are applied in all newly built motorways. For example, the interchanges must be accessible by ramps (acceleration and deceleration lanes) set aside from the main traffic flow, the carriageways separated by continuous median strips. There may be traffic lights intended only for emergencies, while emergency telephones (SOS columns) must be positioned with a certain frequency in emergency parking spaces. The beginning and end of a motorway must be marked with appropriate signs.

== Extent ==
The total length of the Italian motorway system is about 7,016 kilometres (4,360 mi), as of 30 July 2022. To these data are added 13 motorway spur routes, which extend for 355 kilometres (221 mi). In particular, 1,870.2 kilometres (1,162.1 mi) of the Italian motorway network have three lanes per direction/carriageway, 129 kilometres (80 mi) km have four lanes per direction/carriageway, 1.8 kilometres (1.1 mi) have five lanes per carriageway, while the remaining are two lanes per direction/carriageway. The density is 22.4 kilometres (13.9 mi) of motorway for every 1,000 square kilometres (390 sq mi) of Italian territory.

== Nomenclature ==
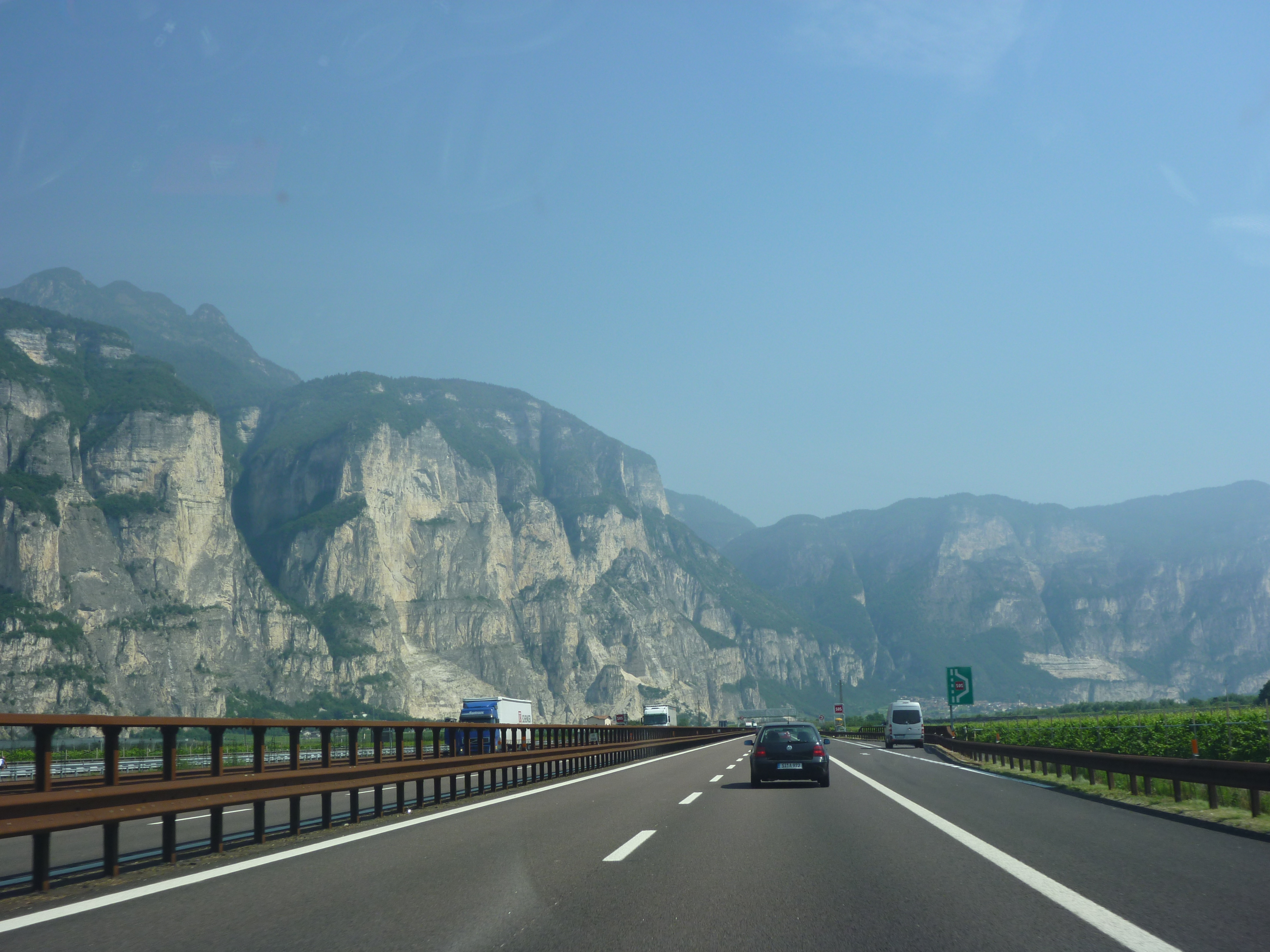
Autostrada A22

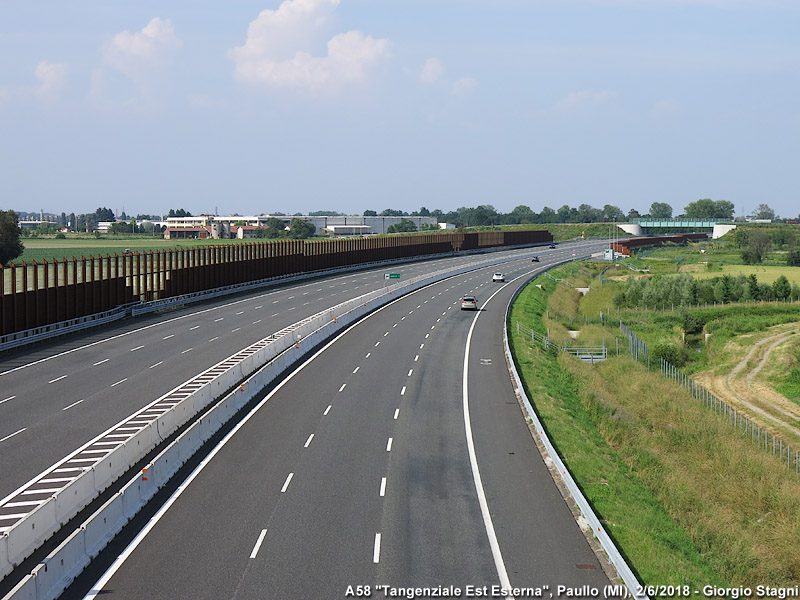
Autostrada A58

Italian motorways follow a single numbering, even if managed by different concessionaire companies: they are all marked with the letter "A" ("RA" in the case of motorway junctions, with the exception of the Bereguardo-Pavia junction numbered on the signs as Autostrada A53, and "T" for the international Alpine tunnels) followed by a number. Therefore, a motorway with the same numbering can be managed by different concessionaire companies (for example the Autostrada A23 is managed for a stretch by Società Autostrade Alto Adriatico and for the remaining stretch by Autostrade per l'Italia).

In road signs the alphanumeric acronym is enclosed (not in the case of the 16 junctions) in a green octagon with a white acronym. The numbers of motorways and tunnels are assigned with a circular from the Minister of Infrastructure and Transport to be published in the Gazzetta Ufficiale.

== Motorway concessions ==
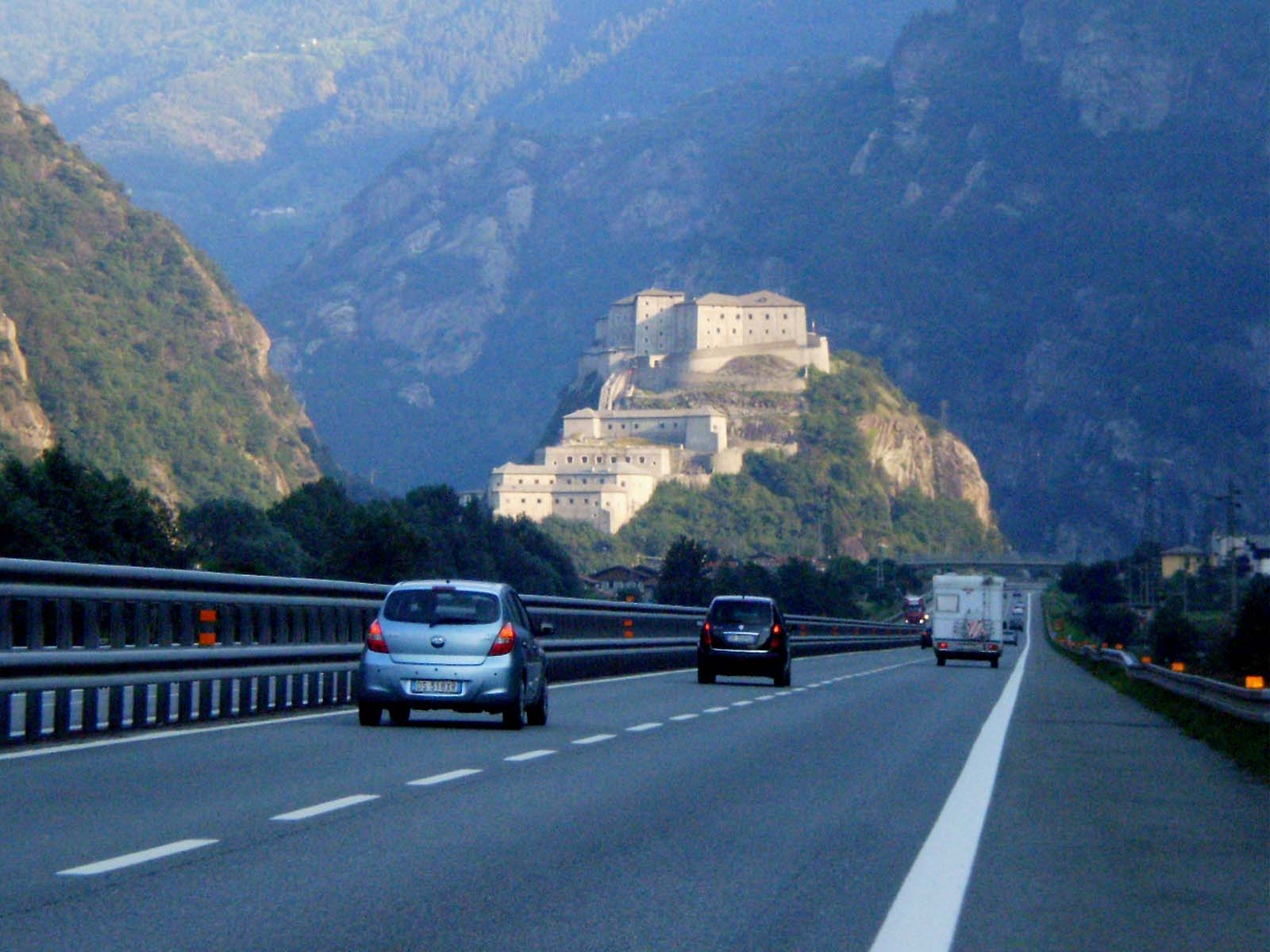
Autostrada A5

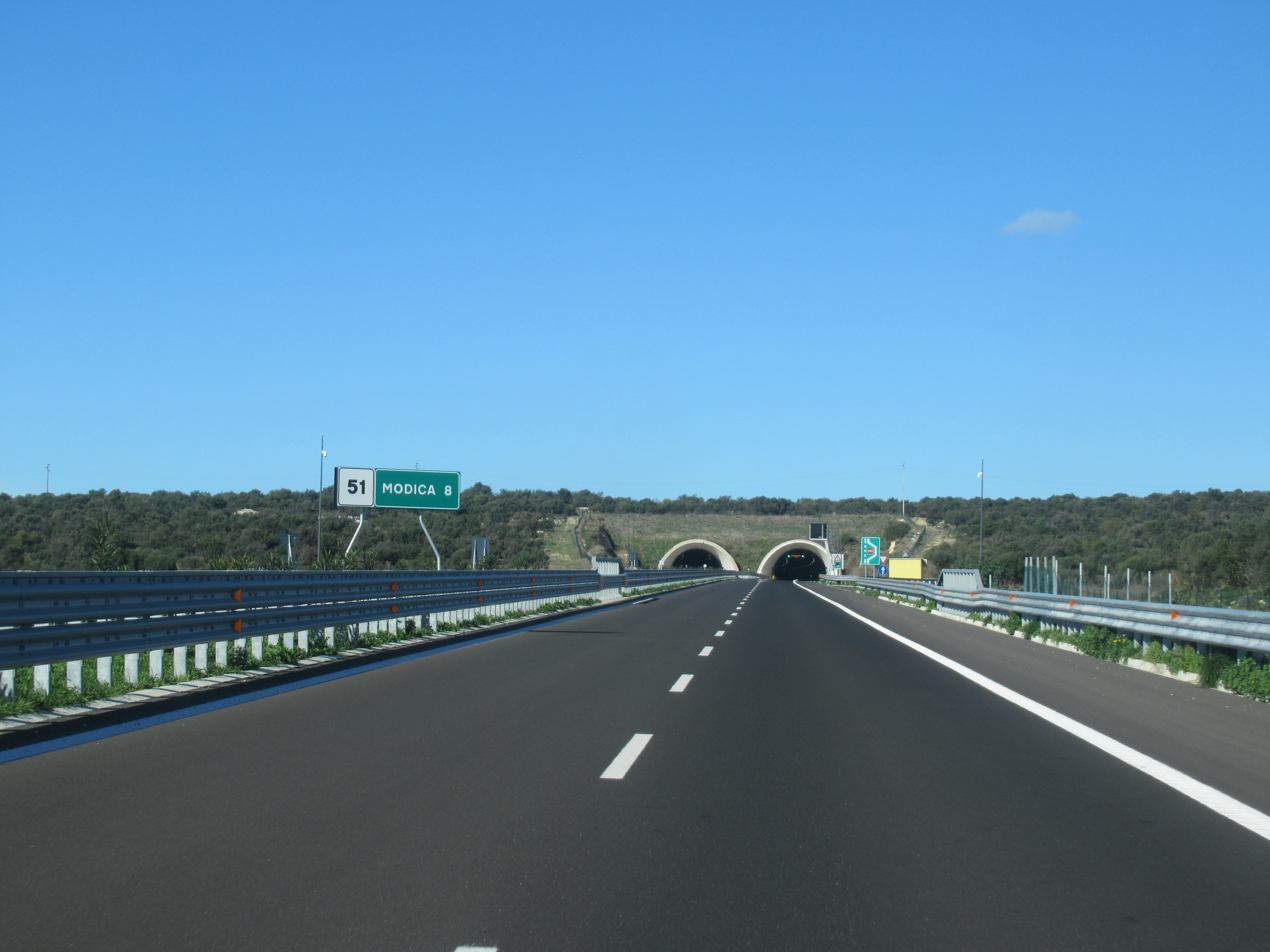
Autostrada A18

The current law (Legislative Decree no. 50/2016) provides that the operational risk is transferred from the contracting authorities to the private economic operator. It also includes traffic risk, i.e. the manifestation of demand for motorway services that is lower than market forecasts and to such an extent that it does not guarantee coverage of the investments and costs of managing the works and the service. Public administrations remain responsible for risks on the supply and demand side that can be attributed outside the scope of normal operating conditions due to the existence of unforeseen and unpredictable events.

Examples of the latter case include the unavailability of the infrastructure due to the failure to carry out scheduled and breakdown maintenance by the concessionaire if it has been deprived of the necessary administrative authorizations and, in particular, of the cost variations borne by the Italian State, which in any case could have been anticipated by the private economic operator, only to then exercise the right of compensation against the public administration. A second example, on the demand side, derives from the unpredictability of demand due to the COVID-19 pandemic and the randomness of the choices made by the public administration to restrict citizens' freedom of movement.

The only exception to this financial scheme is represented by the contractual instrument of the public–private partnership. However, it ordinarily—but not necessarily exclusively—identifies the public administration itself, and not the citizens, as the main user-customer of the service provided by the concessionaire's infrastructure and the user of the granted work. However, it contemplates the granting of ownership or right of enjoyment of a work that is:

- functional to the management of public services;
- available to the contracting authority or which, without any other function of public interest, has been expropriated for this purpose. The motorway network belongs to this category.

== Management ==
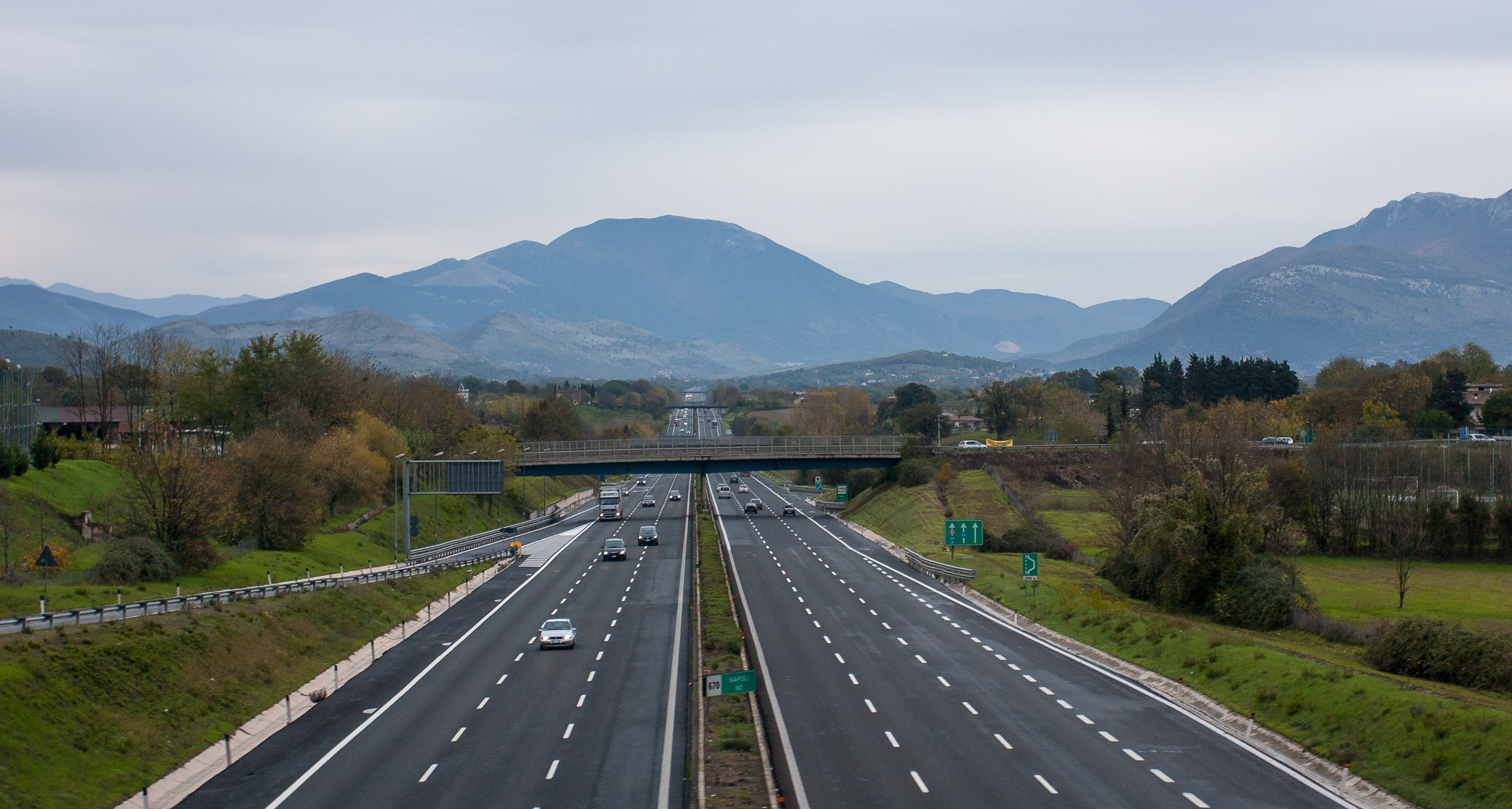
Autostrada A1

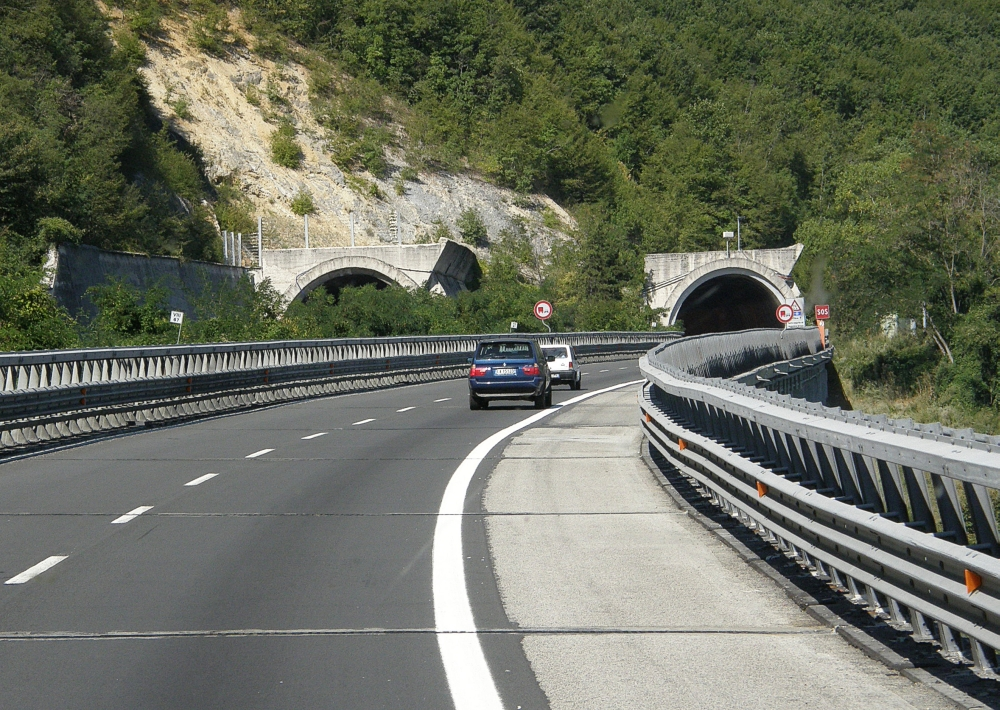
Autostrada A24

Italian motorways are mostly managed by concessionaire companies. From 1 October 2012 the granting body is the Ministry of Infrastructure and Transport and no longer Anas and the majority (5,773.4 kilometres (3,587.4 mi) in 2009) are subject to toll payments. The motorways are managed either by Anas or by companies that have signed agreements with Anas itself.

Until September 2012, Anas controlled the operations of the concessionaire companies through the IVCA (Supervision Inspectorate for motorway concessions) equipped with an autonomous organizational structure. Starting from 1 October 2012, the functions were then transferred to the Ministry of Infrastructure and Transport, which exercises them through the General Directorate for Supervision of Motorway Concessions.

In north and central Italy, the autostrade mainly consists of tollways managed by Autostrade per l'Italia, a holding company controlled by Cassa Depositi e Prestiti. Other operators include ASTM, ATP, and Autostrade Lombarde in the north-west; Autostrada del Brennero, A4 Holding, Concessioni Autostradali Venete, and Autovie Venete in the north-east; Strada dei Parchi, SALT, SAT, and Autocisa in the center; and CAS in the south. In 2009 the entire sector generated a turnover of 5,250 million euros (of which 4,600 million euros in tolls). 50% of the turnover was allocated to investments and maintenance.

The art. 27 of the legislative decree of 21 June 2013, n. 69—converted into law 9 August 2013, n. 98—modified the procedure for the approval of annual adjustments to motorway tariffs, abolishing the provision (dictated by paragraph 5 of art. 21 of legislative decree 355/2003) which regulated, within the scope of the procedure, the relationship between companies grantor and Ministry of Infrastructure and Transport. Now the proposal relating to the tariff changes that the concessionaire intends to apply is formulated to the grantor (therefore to the Ministry of Infrastructure and Transport), by 15 October of each year and that this proposal is approved or rejected by 15 December, by decree reasoned by the Ministry of Infrastructure and Transport (in agreement with the Minister of Economy and Finance).

== Traffic laws ==
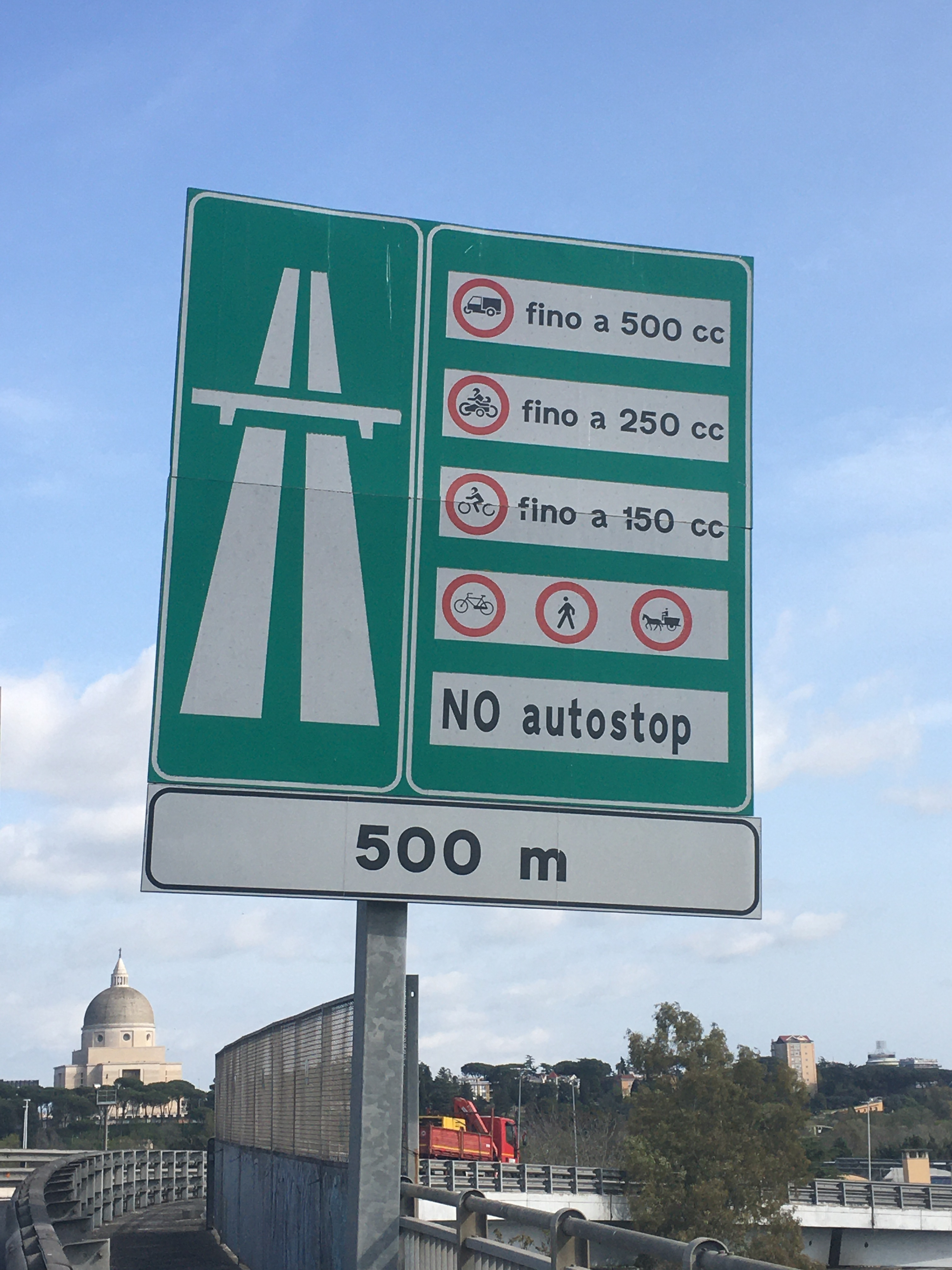
An autostrada regulation sign along an entrance ramp to the Autostrada A91

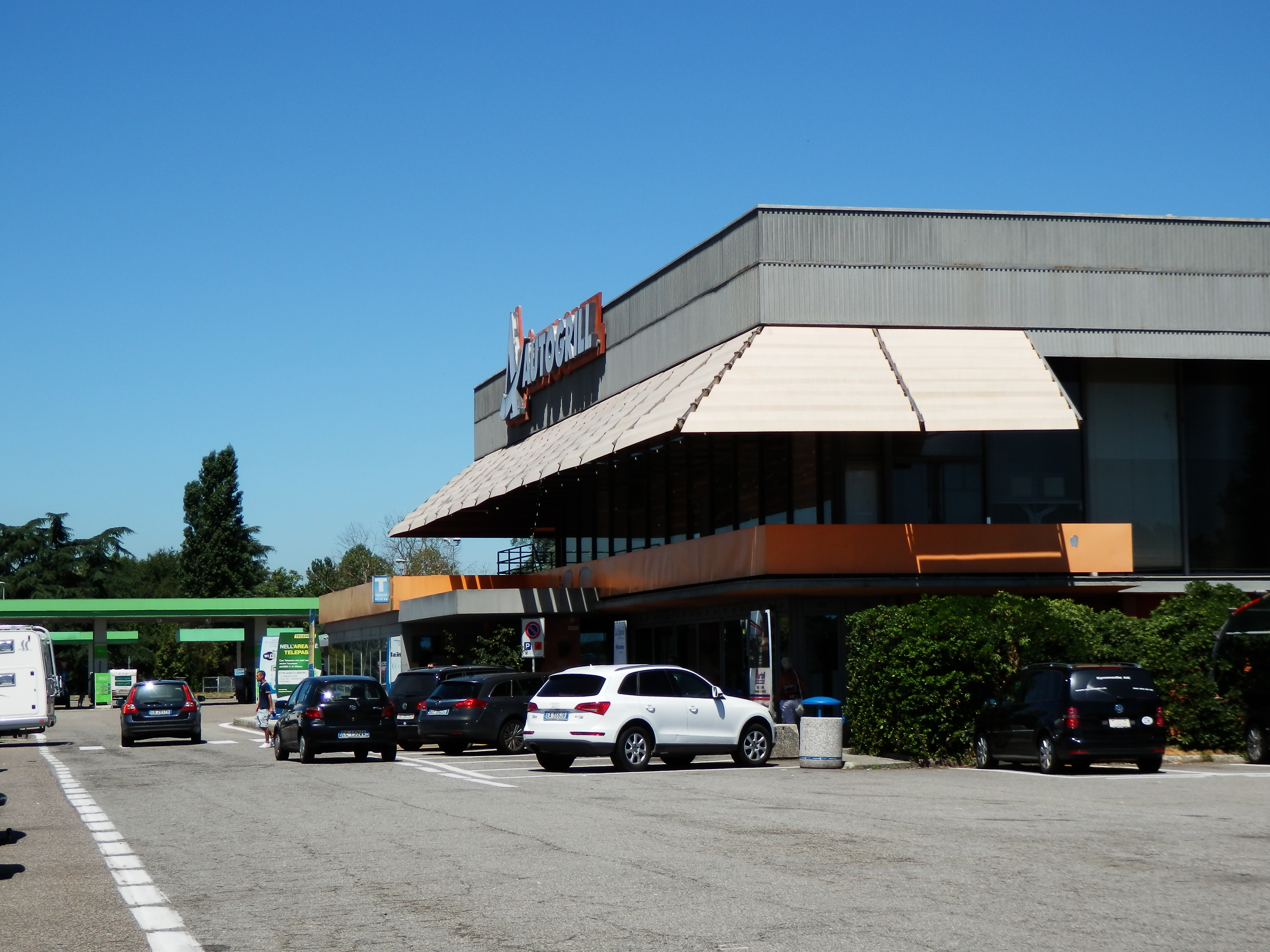
San Zenone al Lambro rest area along the Autostrada A1

Italy's motorways must not be used by:

- Pedestrians and animals
- Pedal-cycles
- Mopeds
- Motorcycles having an engine displacement less than 150 cubic centimetres (9.2 cu in) (if equipped with an internal combustion engine)
- Sidecars having an engine displacement less than 250 cc (15 cu in) (if equipped with an internal combustion engine)
- Motorized tricycles designed for the transport of people with up to 2 seats having an engine displacement less than 250 cc (15 cu in) (if equipped with an internal combustion engine) or having an engine power less than 15 kilowatts (20 PS; 20 bhp)
- Motorcycle-like vehicles (motoveicoli) not included in previous categories having an empty vehicle weight up to 400 kg (880 lb) or a gross vehicle mass up to 1,300 kg (2,900 lb)
- Cars with a maximum speed on flat road less than 80 kilometres per hour (50 mph)
- Vehicles without tyres
- Agricultural vehicles and technical vehicles (e.g. heavy equipment)

The movement of pedestrians and animals (if supervised) is permitted only in service and rest areas. Pedestrians can also travel in the emergency lane only to reach an aid station (for example an SOS column). In service and parking areas, vehicles cannot remain parked for more than 24 hours except for the parking areas of motorway hotels (or similar commercial establishments).

== Safety ==
=== Speed limits ===
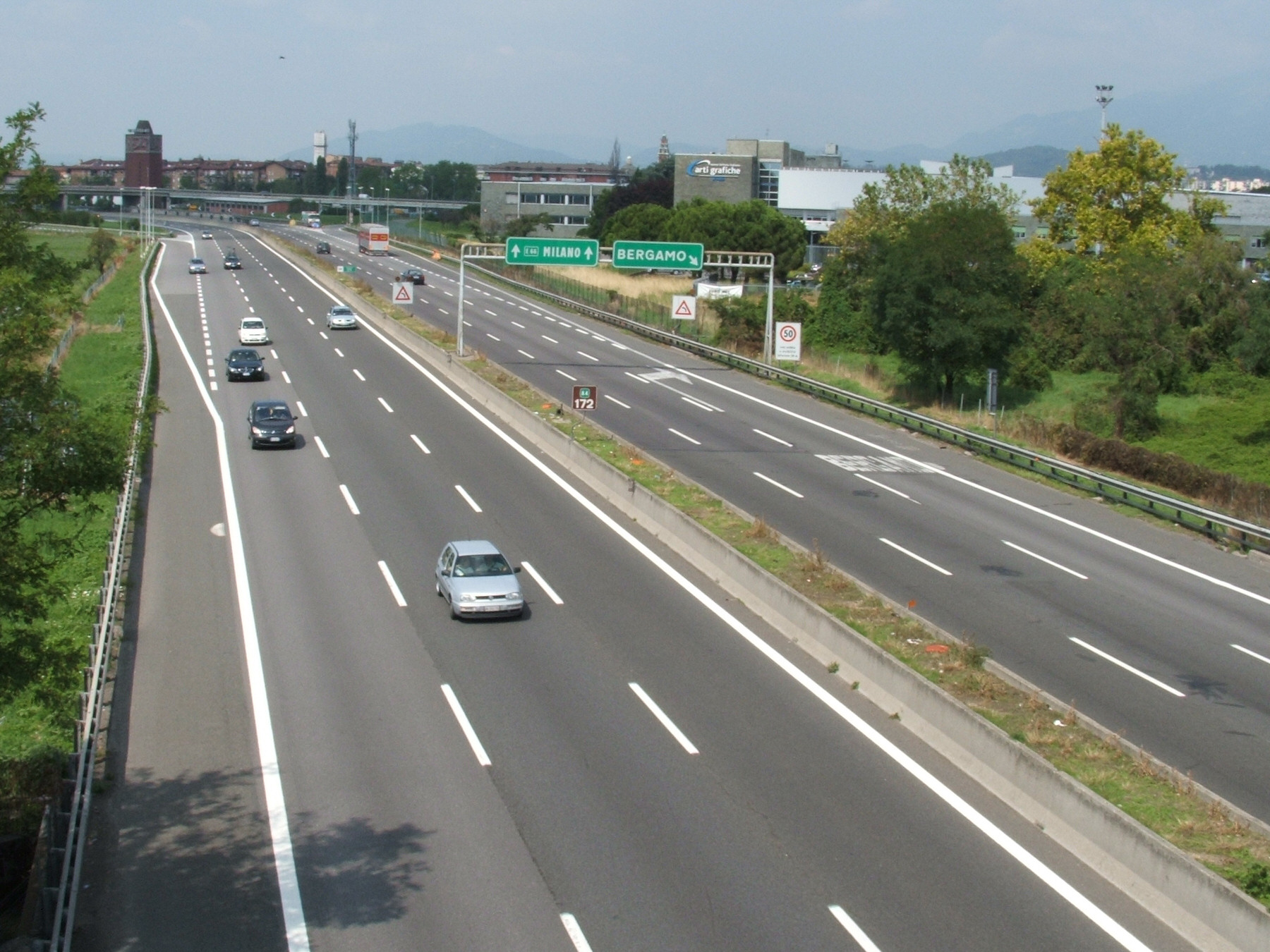
Autostrada A4

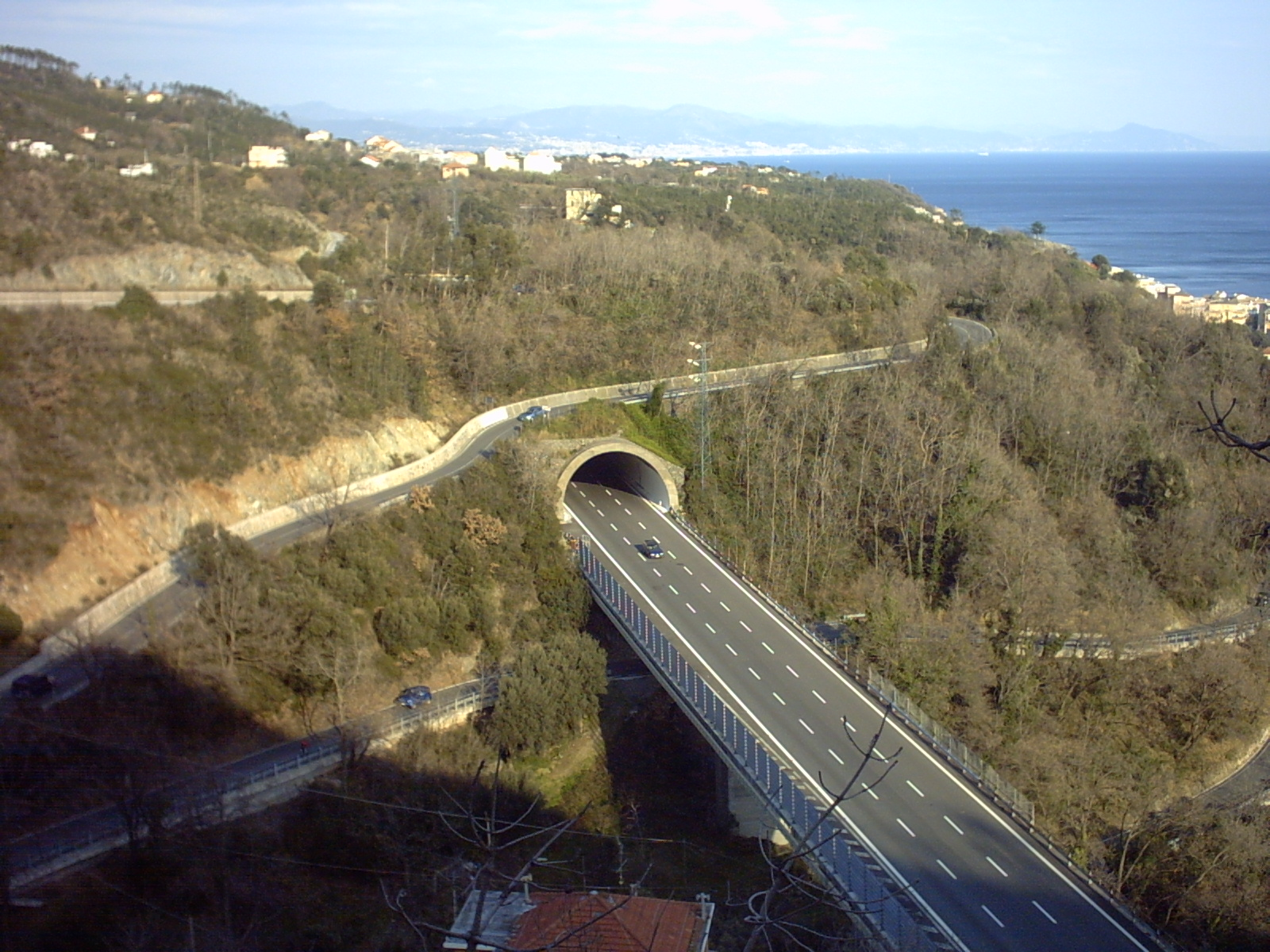
Autostrada A10

Italy's motorways have a standard speed limit of 130 km/h (80 mph) for cars. Limits for other vehicles (or when visibility is poor due to weather) are lower. Legal provisions allow operators to set the limit to 150 km/h (95 mph) on their concessions on a voluntary basis if there are three lanes in each direction and a working SICVE, or Safety Tutor, which is a speed-camera system that measures the average speed over a given distance.

Unlike the normal speed camera, which measures the instantaneous speed of vehicles in a certain road section, the Safety Tutor instead measures the average speed between two sections several kilometres apart, in order to provide a reliable and indisputable measurement for detecting infringements, without penalizing those who exceed the speed limit for short distances such as, for example, when overtaking. One year after the introduction of the Safety Tutor (which took place on 23 December 2005), important benefits were found in reducing accident rates (-22%). In the first year of use, the death rate decreased by 50% and the injury rate by 34% in the areas where the device was installed.

The first speed limit of 120 km/h (75 mph), was enacted in November 1973 as a result of the 1973 oil crisis. In October 1977, a graduated system was introduced: cars with engine displacement above 1.3 L (79 cu in) had a 140 km/h (85 mph) speed limit, cars of 900–1299 cm^{3} had a limit of 130 km/h (80 mph), those of 600–899 cm^{3} could drive at 110 km/h (70 mph), and those of 599 cm^{3} (36.6 cu in) or less had a maximum speed of 90 km/h (55 mph). In July 1988 a blanket speed limit of 110 km/h (70 mph) was imposed on all cars above 600 cm^{3} (the lower limit was kept for smaller cars) by the short-lived PSDI government. In September 1989 this was increased to 130 km/h (80 mph) for cars above 1.1 L (67 cu in) and 110 km/h (70 mph) for smaller ones.

=== Safe design ===
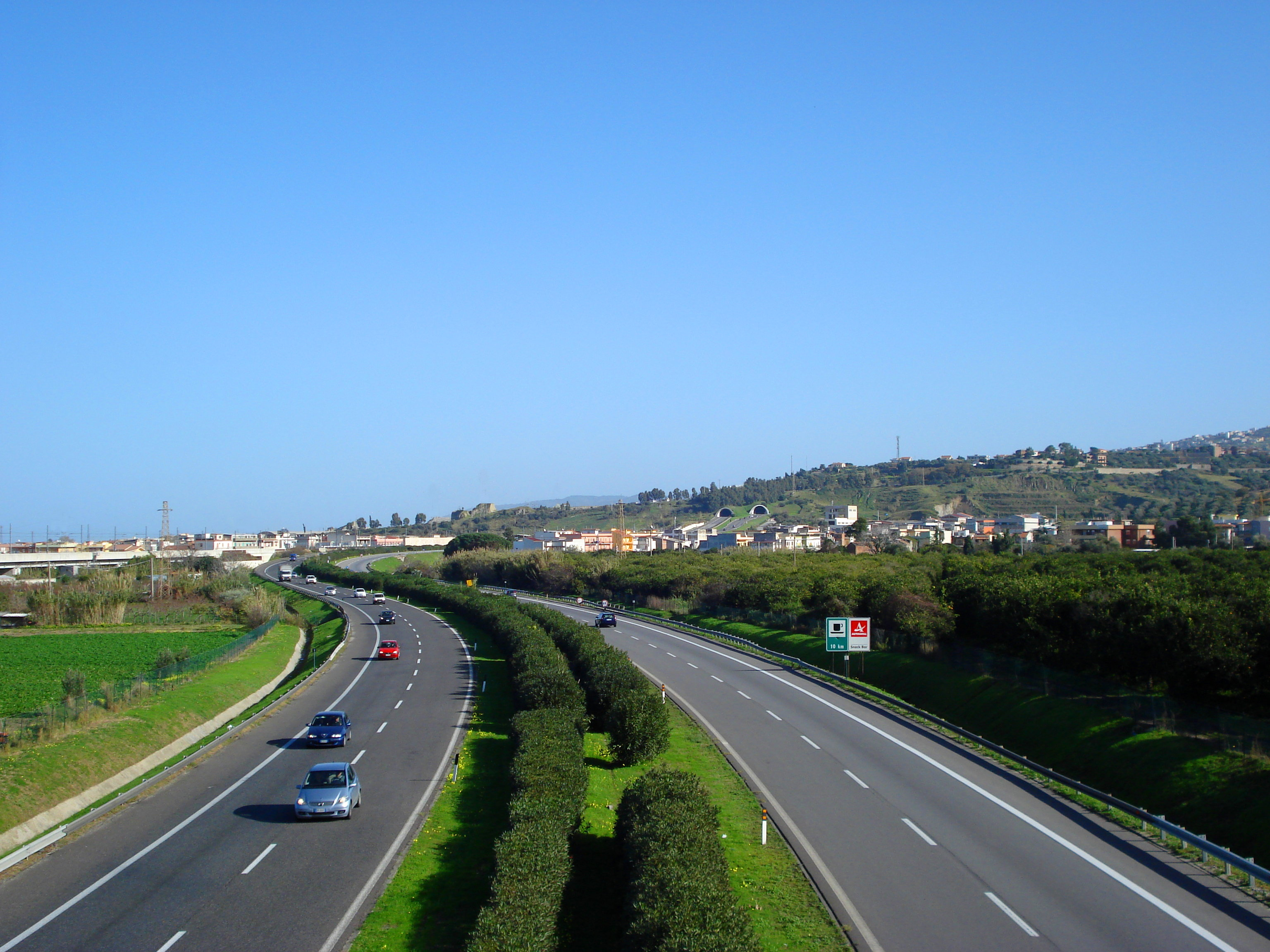
Autostrada A20

The safety features of the Italian motorways include:

- one-way driving: the lanes driving in the opposite direction are separated by a crash barrier; there are no intersecting roads but overpasses and underpasses;
- wider lanes, with at least 2 (often 3) lanes driving in the same direction, with a larger turning radius. Each lane is 3.75 metres (12.3 ft) wide.
- long entrance and exit ramps or slip roads to get on or off of the motorway without disturbing other traffic;
- an emergency lane with a minimum width of 2.5 metres (8 ft 2 in), where it is forbidden to drive (except for emergency services), or park (except in an emergency) and to walk;
- presence of emergency call boxes every 1.5 kilometres (0.93 mi) on each side, which allow you to call for help from medical assistance, mechanical assistance and Fire Brigade with the possibility of localizing the call;
- service areas (Italian: area di servizio, with parking, public toilets and at least one petrol station) every 30 kilometres (19 mi); in 98% of cases there is also a refreshment facility;
- dynamic information panels that warn about possible difficulties ahead (e.g. accidents, roadworks, traffic jams);
- a radio station (102.5 MHz) provides traffic information bulletins and breaking news for emergencies;

== Toll ==
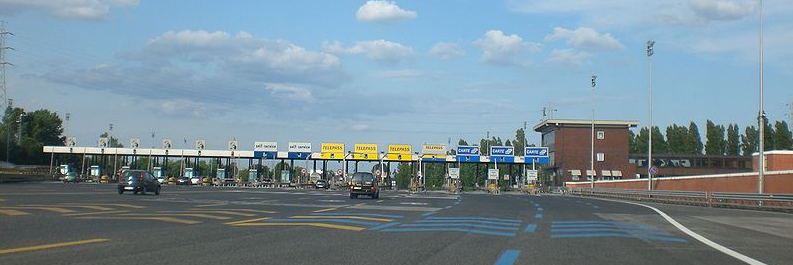
Toll plaza along the Autostrada A57

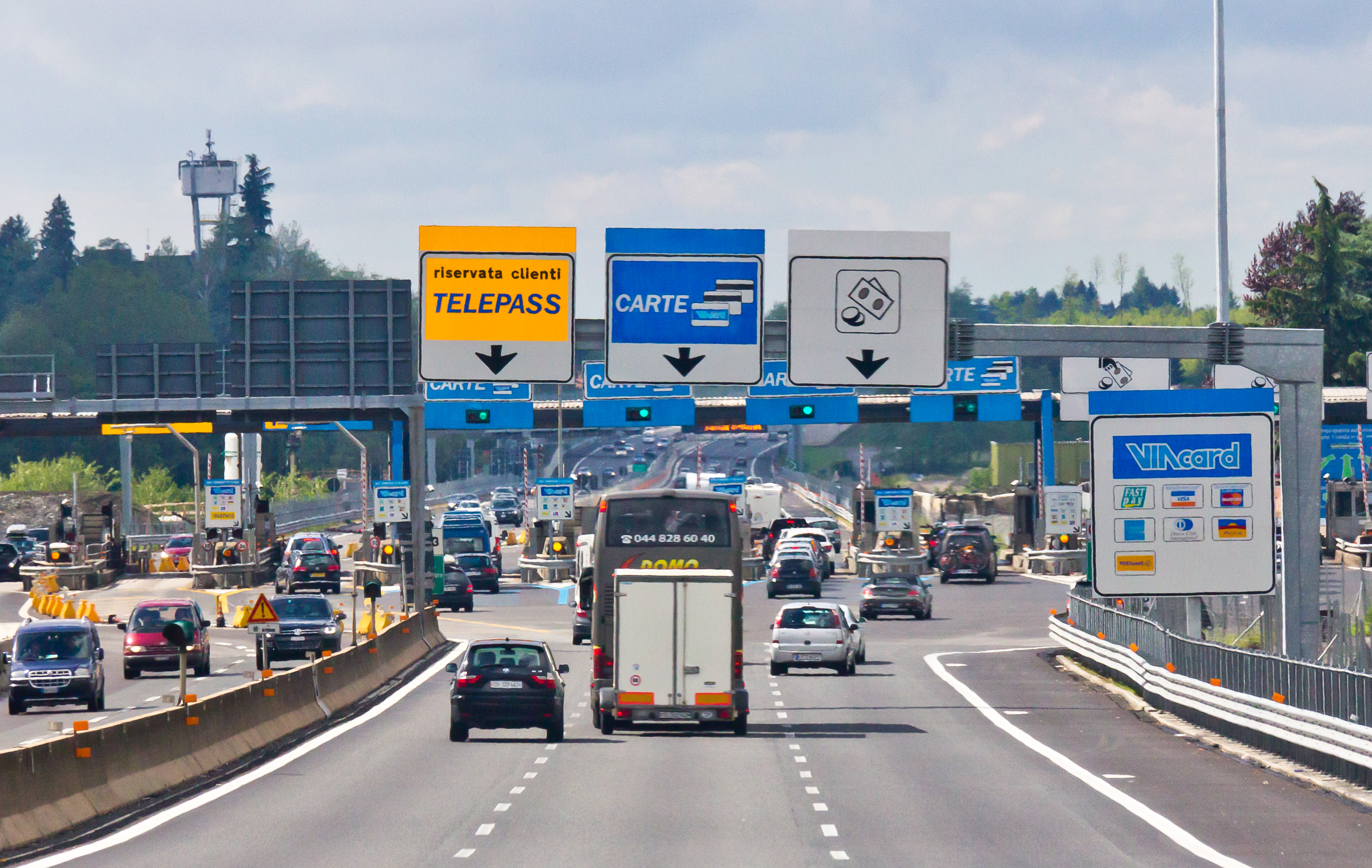
Toll station along the Autostrada A9

On Italian motorways, the toll applies to almost all motorways not managed by Anas. The collection of motorway tolls, from a tariff point of view, is managed mainly in two ways: either through the "closed motorway system" (km travelled) or through the "open motorway system" (flat-rate toll).

Given the multiplicity of operators, the toll is only requested when exiting the motorway and not when the motorway operator changes. This system was made possible following article 14 of law 531 of 12 August 1982.

From a technical point of view, however, the mixed barrier/free-flow system is active where, at the entrance and exit from the motorways, there are lanes dedicated to the collection of a ticket (on entry) and the delivery of the ticket with simultaneous payment (on exit) and other lanes where, during transit without the need to stop, an electronic toll system present in the vehicles records the data and debits the toll, generally into the bank account previously communicated by the customer, to the manager of his device. In Italy, this occurs through the Autostrade per l'Italia interchange system.

The Autostrada A36, Autostrada A59 and Autostrada A60 are exclusively free-flow. On these motorways, those who do not have the electronic toll device on board must proceed with the payment by subsequently communicating the data to the motorway manager (by telephone, online or by going to the offices dedicated to payment).

The closed motorway system is applied to most Italian motorways. It requires the driver of the vehicle to collect a special ticket at the entrance to the motorway and pay the amount due upon exit. If equipped with an electronic toll system the two procedures are completely automatic and the driver on the detection lanes located at the entrances and exits from the motorways subject to toll payment must only proceed at a maximum speed of 30 kilometres per hour (20 mph) without the need to stop. The amount is directly proportional to the distance travelled by the vehicle, the coefficient of its class and a variable coefficient from motorway to motorway, called the kilometre rate.

Unlike the closed motorway system, in the open system, the road user does not pay based on the distance travelled. Motorway barriers are arranged along the route (however not at every junction), at which the user pays a fixed sum, depending only on the class of the vehicle. The user can therefore travel along sections of the motorway without paying any toll as the barriers may not be present on the section travelled.

== List of current autostrade (A) ==
Number	Length (km)	Length (mi)	Southern or western terminus	Northern or eastern terminus	Route name	Formed	Removed	Notes
A 1	759.8	472.1	Milan	Naples	Autostrada del Sole	1964	current	E35, E45
A 2	202.1	125.6	Rome	Naples	Autostrada del Sole	1962	1988	Absorbed into the A1
A 2	442.9	275.2	Salerno	Reggio Calabria	Autostrada del Mediterraneo	2017	current	E45, E90, E841
A 3	51.7	32.1	Naples	Salerno		1974	current	E45
A 4	522.4	324.6	Turin	Trieste	Serenissima	1927	current	E55, E64, E70
A 5	141.4	87.9	Turin	Mont Blanc	Autostrada della Valle d'Aosta	1961	current	E25, E612
A 6	123.7	76.9	Turin	Savona	La Verdemare	1960	current	E717
A 7	135.5	84.2	Milan	Genoa	Autostrada dei Giovi	1935	current	E25, E62
A 8	43.6	27.1	Milan	Varese	Autostrada dei Laghi	1924	current	E35, E62
A 9	30.9	19.2	Lainate	Chiasso	Autostrada dei Laghi	1924	current	E35
A 10	158.1	98.2	Genoa	Ventimiglia	Autostrada dei Fiori	1967	current	E25, E74, E80
A 11	81.7	50.8	Florence	Pisa	Autostrada Firenze-Mare	1933	current	E76
A 12	210.0	130.5	Genoa	Rome	Autostrada Azzurra	1967	current	E80
A 13	116.7	72.5	Bologna	Padua		1970	current	
A 14	743.4	461.9	Bologna	Taranto	Autostrada Adriatica	1966	current	E45, E843
A 15	108.5	67.4	Parma	La Spezia	Autocamionale della Cisa	1975	current	E33
A 16	172.5	107.2	Naples	Canosa di Puglia	Autostrada dei Due Mari	1966	current	E842
A 17	242	150	Naples	Bari		1969	1973	Absorbed into the A14 and A16
A 18	76.8	47.7	Messina	Catania		1971	current	E45
A 18 SR-Gela	47.7	29.6	Syracuse	Ispica		1983	current	E45
A 19	191.6	119.1	Palermo	Catania		1970	current	E90, E932
A 20	183.0	113.7	Messina	Buonfornello		1972	current	E45, E90
A 21	238.3	148.1	Turin	Brescia	Autostrada dei Vini	1968	current	E70
A 22	315.0	195.7	Brenner	Modena	Autostrada del Brennero	1968	current	E45
A 23	119.9	74.5	Palmanova	Tarvisio	Autostrada Alpe-Adria	1966	current	E55
A 24	158.8	98.7	Rome	Teramo	Autostrada dei Parchi	1969	current	E80
A 25	115.0	71.5	Torano di Borgorose	Pescara	Autostrada dei Parchi	1969	current	E80
A 26	197.1	122.5	Genoa	Gravellona Toce	Autostrada dei Trafori	1976	current	E25, E62
A 27	82.5	51.3	Venice	Belluno	Autostrada d'Alemagna	1972	current	
A 28	48.8	30.3	Portogruaro	Conegliano		1974	current	
A 29	114.8	71.3	Palermo	Mazara del Vallo	Autostrada del Sale	1972	current	E90
A 30	55.3	34.4	Caserta	Salerno		1975	current	
A 31	88.7	55.1	Badia Polesine	Piovene Rocchette	Autostrada della Val d'Astico	1976	current	
A 32	73.0	45.4	Turin	Fréjus Road Tunnel	Autostrada del Frejus	1983	current	E70
A 33	23.0	14.3	Cuneo	Carrù	Autostrada del Tartufo	2005	current	
A 34	17.5	10.9	Villesse	Gorizia		2013	current	
A 35	54.8	34.1	Castegnato	Melzo	BreBeMi	2014	current	
A 36	23.0	14.3	Cassano Magnago	Lentate sul Seveso	Pedemontana Lombarda	2015	current	
A 50	31.3	19.4	Ring road around Milan		Tangenziale Ovest di Milano	1968	current	E35, E62
A 51	30.7	19.1	Ring road around Milan		Tangenziale Est di Milano	1971	current	
A 52	21.6	13.4	Ring road around Milan		Tangenziale Nord di Milano	1994	current	
A 53	9.2	5.7	Bereguardo	Pavia	Raccordo autostradale RA7	1960	current	
A 54	8.4	5.2	Ring road around Pavia		Tangenziale Ovest di Pavia	1994	current	
A 55	57.5	35.7	Ring road around Turin		Tangenziale di Torino	1976	current	E70
A 56	20.2	12.6	Ring road around Naples		Tangenziale di Napoli	1972	current	
A 57	26.7	16.6	Ring road around Mestre		Tangenziale di Mestre	1972	current	E55
A 58	31.8	19.8	Ring road around Milan		Tangenziale Est Esterna di Milano	2014	current	
A 59	2.9	1.8	Ring road around Como		Tangenziale di Como	2015	current	
A 60	4.5	2.8	Ring road around Varese		Tangenziale di Varese	2015	current	
A 90	68.2	42.4	Ring road around Rome		Grande Raccordo Anulare di Roma	1951	current	E80
A 91	18.4	11.4	Rome	Fiumicino Airport	Autostrada Roma-Fiumicino	1959	current	E80
Former

== List of current raccordi autostradali (RA) ==
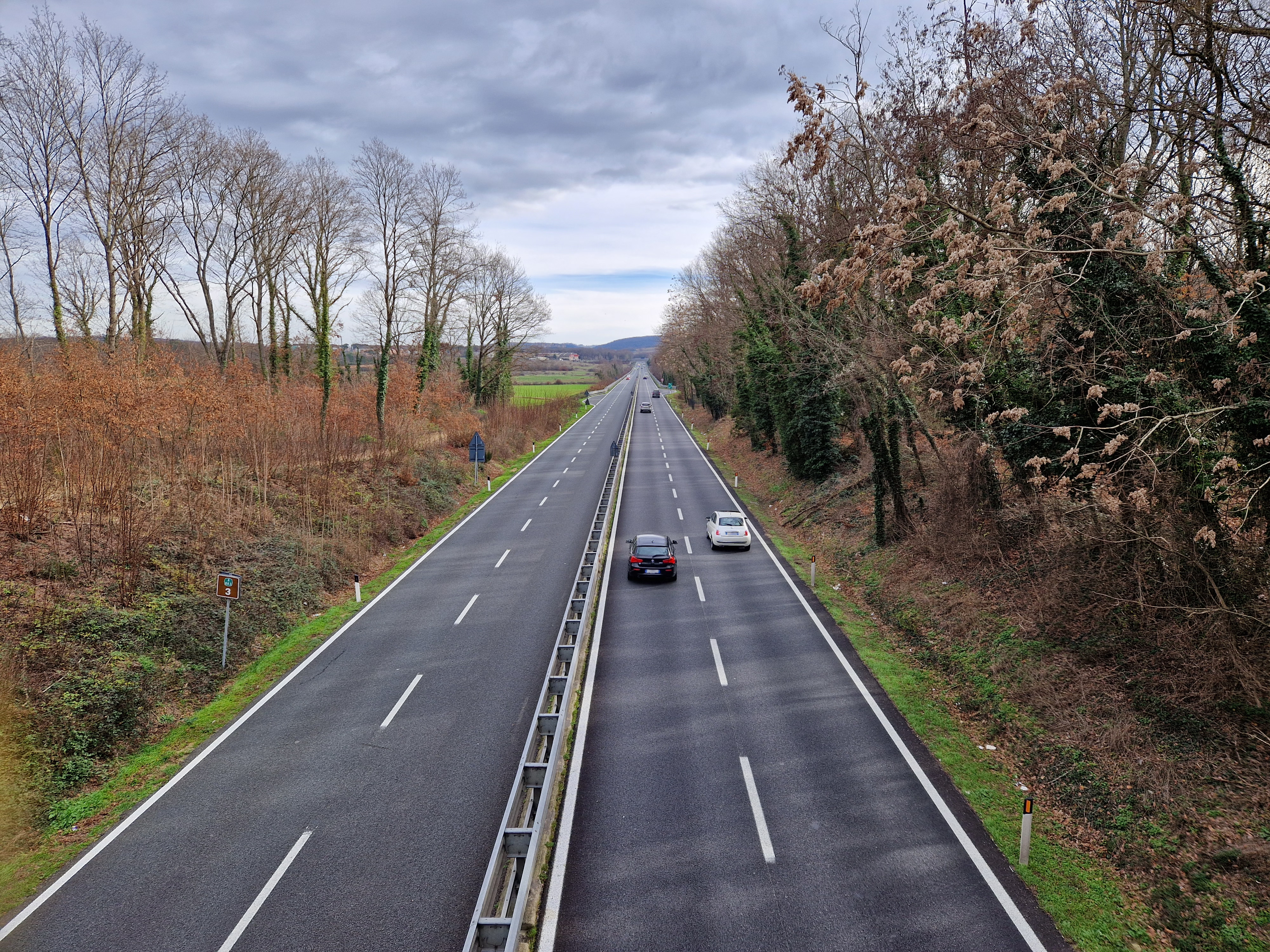
Raccordo autostradale RA3

The acronym RA stands for Raccordo autostradale (translated as 'motorway connection'), a relatively short spur route that connects a motorway to a nearby city or tourist resort not directly served by the motorway. These spurs are owned and managed by Anas. Some spurs are toll-free motorways (type-A), but most are type-B or type-C roads. All RA have separate lanes/carriageways with two lanes in each direction. Generally, they do not have an emergency lane.

In 1984, by a ministerial decree dated 20 July 1983, some motorway junctions, already open, forming part of the Italian trunk roads, were defined and classified as such. The legislative decree of 29 October 1999, n. 461, reorganized the road sections classified as motorway junctions, identifying 17 of them. In the following years, the RA7 was classified, in parallel with the name already assumed, in Autostrada A53, maintaining both names in official documents. The RA17, however, in 2013, following modernization works, was completely reclassified as a motorway, changing its name to Autostrada A34. By 2023, 16 Italian road sections were classified with the RA acronym.

Number	Length (km)	Length (mi)	Southern or western terminus	Northern or eastern terminus	Route name	Formed	Removed	Notes
RA 1	22.2	13.8	Ring road around Bologna		Tangenziale di Bologna	1967	current	A1 - A13 - A14
RA 2	23.6	14.7	Fisciano	Atripalda	Raccordo autostradale di Avellino	1967	current	A3 - Avellino
RA 3	56.3	35.0	Siena	Florence	Raccordo autostradale Siena-Firenze	1964	current	A1 - Siena
RA 4	5.5	3.4	Ring road around Reggio Calabria		Tangenziale di Reggio Calabria	1970	current	A3 - Reggio Calabria - SS106
RA 5	51.5	32.0	Sicignano degli Alburni	Potenza	Raccordo autostradale Sicignano-Potenza	1970	current	A3 - Potenza
RA 6	59.3	36.8	Bettolle	Perugia	Raccordo autostradale Bettolle-Perugia	1971	current	A1 - Perugia
RA 7	9.1	5.7	Pavia	Bereguardo	Autostrada A53	1960	current	A7 - Tangenziale di Pavia
RA 8	49.0	30.4	Ferrara	Comacchio	Raccordo autostradale Ferrara-Porto Garibaldi	1973	current	A13 - Ferrara - Porto Garibaldi
RA 9	12.7	7.9	Venticano	Benevento	Raccordo autostradale di Benevento	1977	current	A16 - Benevento
RA 10	10.7	6.6	Turin	Caselle Torinese	Raccordo autostradale Torino-Caselle	1988	current	Turin - A55 - Turin Caselle Airport
RA 11	26.0	16.2	Ascoli Piceno	San Benedetto del Tronto	Superstrada Ascoli-Mare	1990	current	Ascoli - A14 - Porto d'Ascoli
RA 12	14.8	9.2	Chieti	Pescara	Raccordo autostradale Chieti-Pescara	1975	current	A25 - Chieti - A14 - Pescara
RA 13	21.0	13.0	Sistiana	Padriciano	Raccordo autostradale Sistiana-Padriciano	1970	current	A4 - SS202
RA 14	1.5	0.93	Opicina	Fernetti	Diramazione per Fernetti	1997	current	RA13 - Fernetti (Italy–Slovenia border)
RA 15	23.3	14.5	Ring road around Catania		Tangenziale di Catania	1985	current	A18 - A19 - Aut. CT-SR
RA 16	2.9	1.8	Cimpello	Fiume Veneto	Raccordo autostradale Cimpello-Pian di Pan	1974	current	A28 - SS13 Pontebbana

== List of current trafori (T) ==
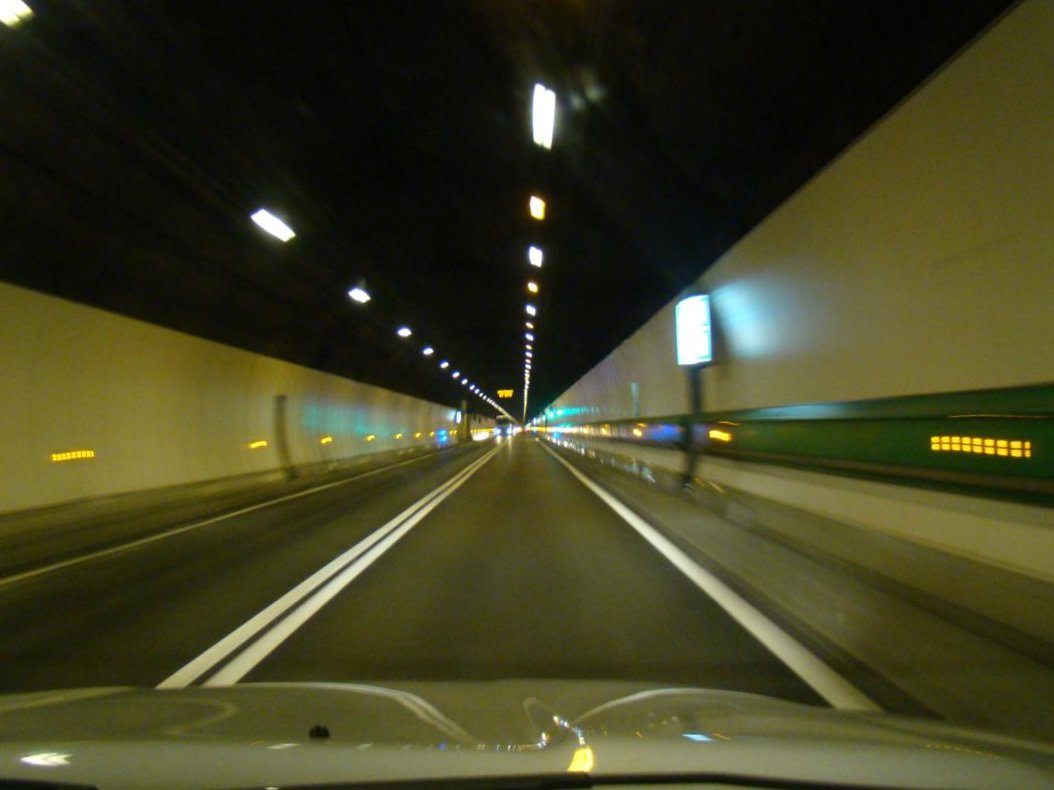
Mont-Blanc Tunnel (T1)

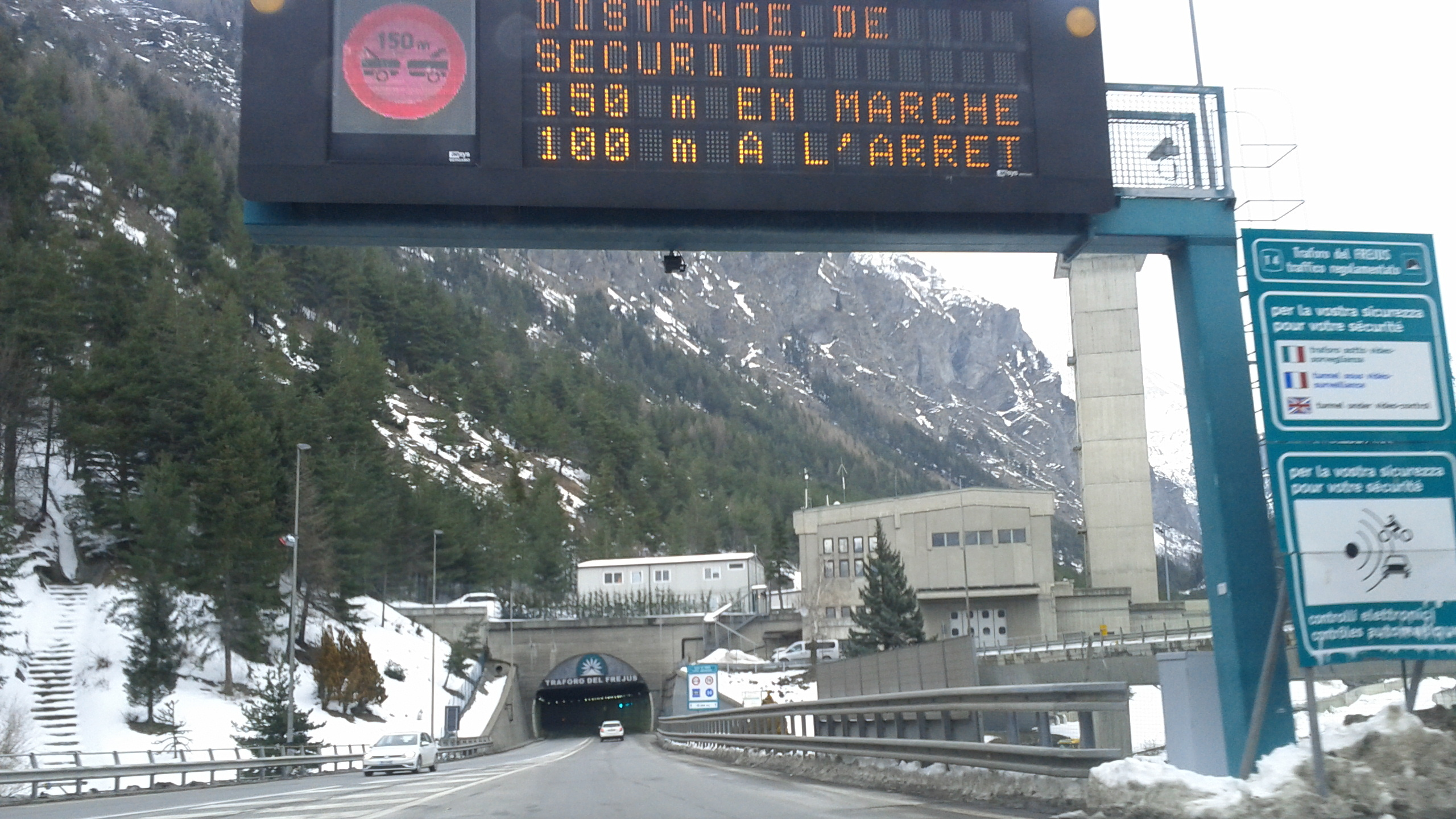
Entrance to the Frejus Road Tunnel (T4) from the Italian side

Important Alpine tunnels (Italian: trafori; sing.: traforo) are identified by the capital letter "T" followed by a single digit number.

Currently there are only three T-classified tunnels: Mont Blanc Tunnel (T1), Great St Bernard Tunnel (T2) and Frejus Road Tunnel (T4). Tunnels that cross the border between Italy and France (T1, T4) or Switzerland (T2), are treated as motorways (green signage, access control, and so on), although they are not proper motorways.

The code T3 was once assigned to the Bargagli-Ferriere Tunnel in Ligurian Apennines, opened in 1971. The T3 tunnel connected Bargagli with Ferriere, in the province of Genoa, for a length of 4.250 kilometres (2.641 mi). It was initially classified as a motorway, but following the decree of 22 July 1989, responsibilities were transferred to Anas, which included the route in the itinerary of the state road 225 of Val Fontanabuona. However, the road maintains all the motorway rules regarding access.

Number	Traforo name	Route	Length	Opened	Removed	Speed limit
	Mont Blanc Tunnel	Courmayeur (Italy) - Chamonix-Mont-Blanc (France)	11.6 km (7.2 mi)	1965	current	50–70 km/h (31–43 mph)
	Great St Bernard Tunnel	Saint-Rhémy-en-Bosses (Italy) - Bourg-Saint-Pierre (Switzerland)	5.8 km (3.6 mi)	1964	current	80 km/h (50 mph)
	Fréjus Road Tunnel	Bardonecchia (Italy) - Modane (France)	12.9 km (8.0 mi)	1980	current	70 km/h (43 mph)

== List of bretelle, diramazioni and raccordi autostradali ==
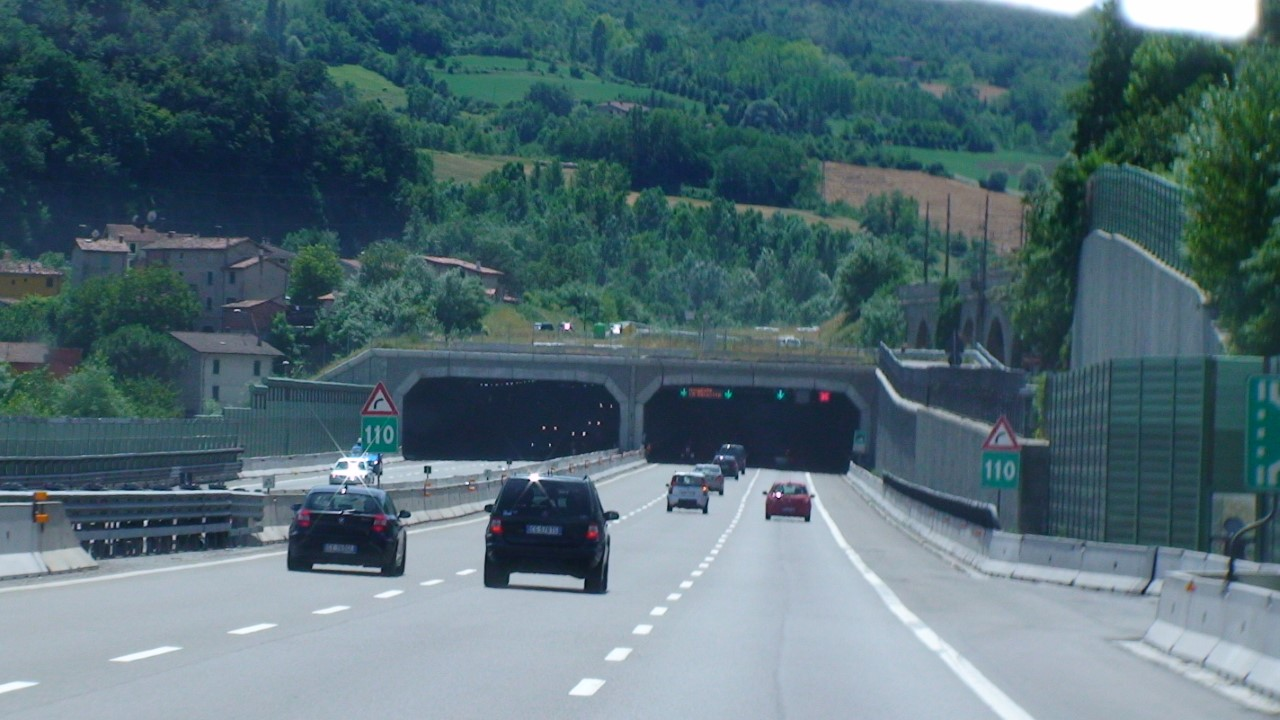
Variante di Valico (A1 var)

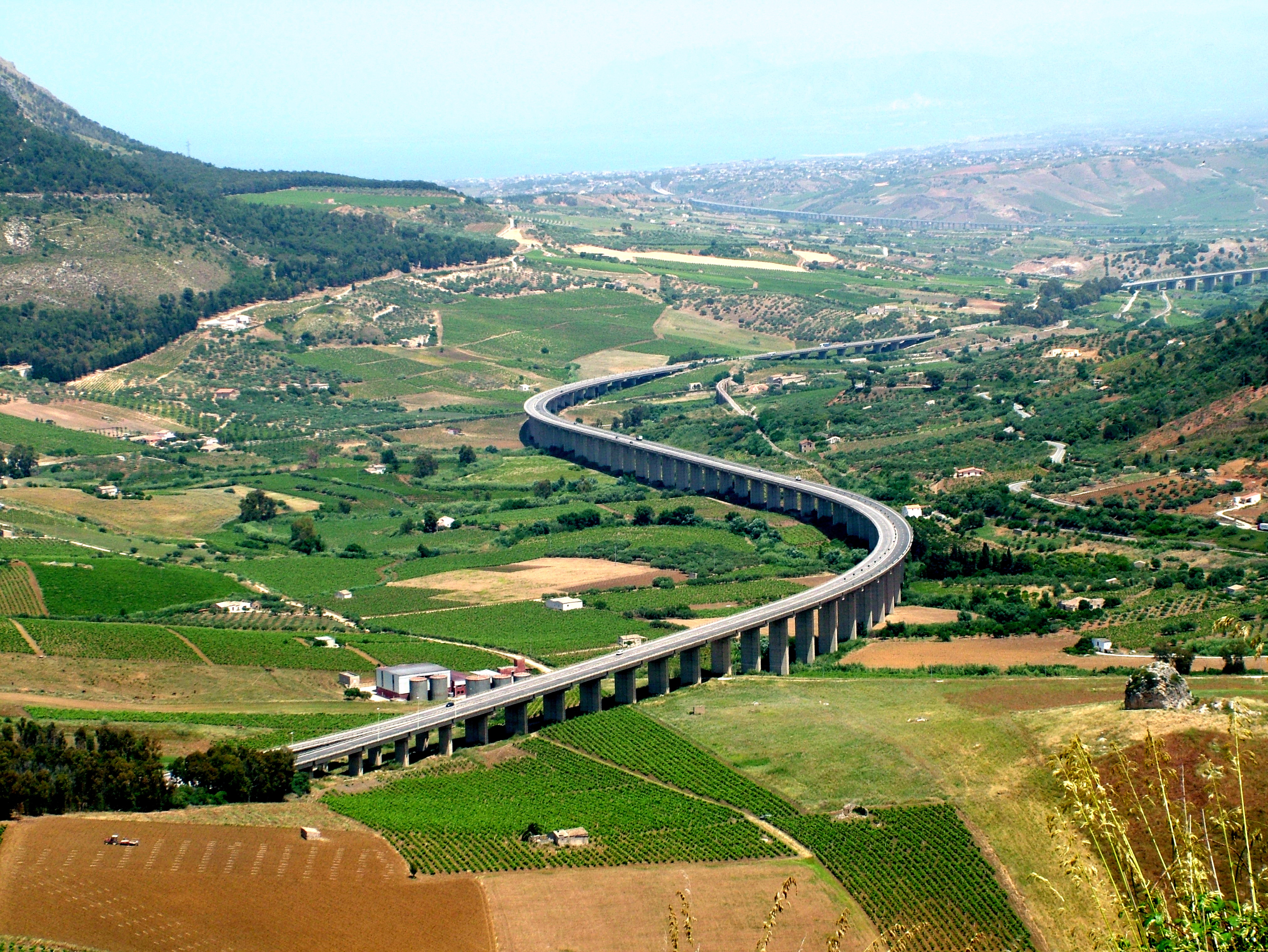
Diramazione Alcamo-Trapani (A29 dir)

Some motorways are called bretelle, diramazioni or raccordi because they are short and have few exits.

Bretelle, diramazioni or raccordi are generally connections between two motorways or connections between motorways and important cities without a motorway.

They have the same number (sometimes with the suffix dir) as one of the two motorways linked, a combination of the numbers of the two motorways linked, or the number of the main motorway.

Number	Name	length	Connection
A1	Raccordo A1-A51	1.7 km (1.1 mi)	A1 - A51
A1	Raccordo Milano-Piazzale Corvetto	2.5 km (1.6 mi)	A1 - Milano Piazzale Corvetto
A1	Diramazione Capodichino	3.0 km (1.9 mi)	A1 - Aeroporto di Capodichino - A56
A1dir	Diramazione Roma nord	23.0 km (14.3 mi)	A1 - GRA
A1dir	Diramazione Roma sud	20.0 km (12.4 mi)	A1 - GRA
A1var	Variante di Valico	33.0 km (20.5 mi)	A1 - A1
A1	A1 Raccordo Sasso Marconi - SS 64	2.7 km (1.7 mi)	A1 - Sasso Marconi - Strada statale 64 Porrettana
A2dir	A2 dir. Napoli	2.3 km (1.4 mi)	A2 - A3
A2dir	A2 dir. Reggio Calabria	9.0 km (5.6 mi)	A2 - Reggio Calabria
A4	Raccordo Chivasso	5.0 km (3.1 mi)	A4 - Verolengo
A4	Bretella Latisana	2.6 km (1.6 mi)	A4 - Strada statale 14 della Venezia Giulia
A4/A5	Raccordo Ivrea-Santhià	23.6 km (14.7 mi)	A4 - A5
A5	Raccordo A5-SS 27	7.9 km (4.9 mi)	A5 - Strada statale 27 del Gran San Bernardo
A6	Diramazione per Fossano	6.6 km (4.1 mi)	A6 - Fossano
A8/A26	Diramazione Gallarate-Gattico	24.0 km (14.9 mi)	A8 - A26
A11/A12	Diramazione Lucca-Viareggio	18.2 km (11.3 mi)	A11 - A12
A12	Diramazione per Livorno	5.0 km (3.1 mi)	A12 - Livorno
A13	Diramazione per Padova sud	4.3 km (2.7 mi)	A13 - Padua
A13	Diramazione per Ferrara	6.3 km (3.9 mi)	A13 - Ferrara - RA8
A14	Raccordo per Tangenziale di Bari	4.6 km (2.9 mi)	A14 - Tangenziale di Bari
A14dir	Diramazione per Ravenna	29.8 km (18.5 mi)	A14 - Ravenna
A14	Ramo Casalecchio	5.5 km (3.4 mi)	A14 - Casalecchio di Reno
A15	Diramazione per Santo Stefano di Magra	1.2 km (0.75 mi)	A15 - Santo Stefano di Magra
A15	Diramazione per Lerici	3.7 km (2.3 mi)	A15 - Lerici
A18dir	Diramazione per Catania	3.7 km (2.3 mi)	A18 - Catania
A19dir	Raccordo A19-Palermo	5.2 km (3.2 mi)	A19 - Circonvallazione di Palermo
A21dir	Diramazione per Fiorenzuola	12.3 km (7.6 mi)	A1 - A21
A23	Raccordo Udine Sud	2.7 km (1.7 mi)	A23 - Udine
A4/A26	Diramazione Stroppiana-Santhià	29.7 km (18.5 mi)	A4 - A26
A26/A7	Diramazione Predosa-Bettole	17.0 km (10.6 mi)	A7 - A26
A29dir	Diramazione Alcamo-Trapani	36.9 km (22.9 mi)	A29 - Trapani
A29dirA	Diramazione per Birgi	13.1 km (8.1 mi)	A29dir - Trapani–Birgi Airport
A29racc	Bretella aeroporto Falcone e Borsellino	4.1 km (2.5 mi)	A29 - Palermo International Airport
A29racc bis	Raccordo per via Belgio	5.6 km (3.5 mi)	A29 - Circonvallazione di Palermo
A55	Diramazione per Pinerolo	23.4 km (14.5 mi)	A55 - Pinerolo
A55	Diramazione per Moncalieri	6.2 km (3.9 mi)	A6 - Moncalieri
A55	Raccordo della Falchera	3.2 km (2.0 mi)	A55 - A4 - SR 11
A57	Diramazione aeroporto Marco Polo	6.5 km (4.0 mi)	A57 - Venice Marco Polo Airport

== Strade extraurbane principali ==
Strada extraurbana principale sign

Type B highway (Italian: strada extraurbana principale), commonly but unofficially known as superstrada (Italian equivalent for expressway), is a divided highway with at least two lanes in each direction, paved shoulder on the right, no cross-traffic and no at-grade intersections. Access restrictions on such highways are exactly the same as motorways.

The signage at the beginning and the end of the highways is the same, except the background colour is blue instead of green. The general speed limit on strade extraurbane principali is 110 km/h (70 mph), unless otherwise indicated, for buses with a fully loaded mass between 3.5 and 8 t (3.9 and 8.8 short tons) and for trucks with a fully loaded mass between 3.5 and 12 t (3.9 and 13.2 short tons) it is 80 km/h (50 mph), for trucks with a full load mass exceeding 12 t (13 short tons) and for vehicles towing trailers it is 70 km/h (45 mph).

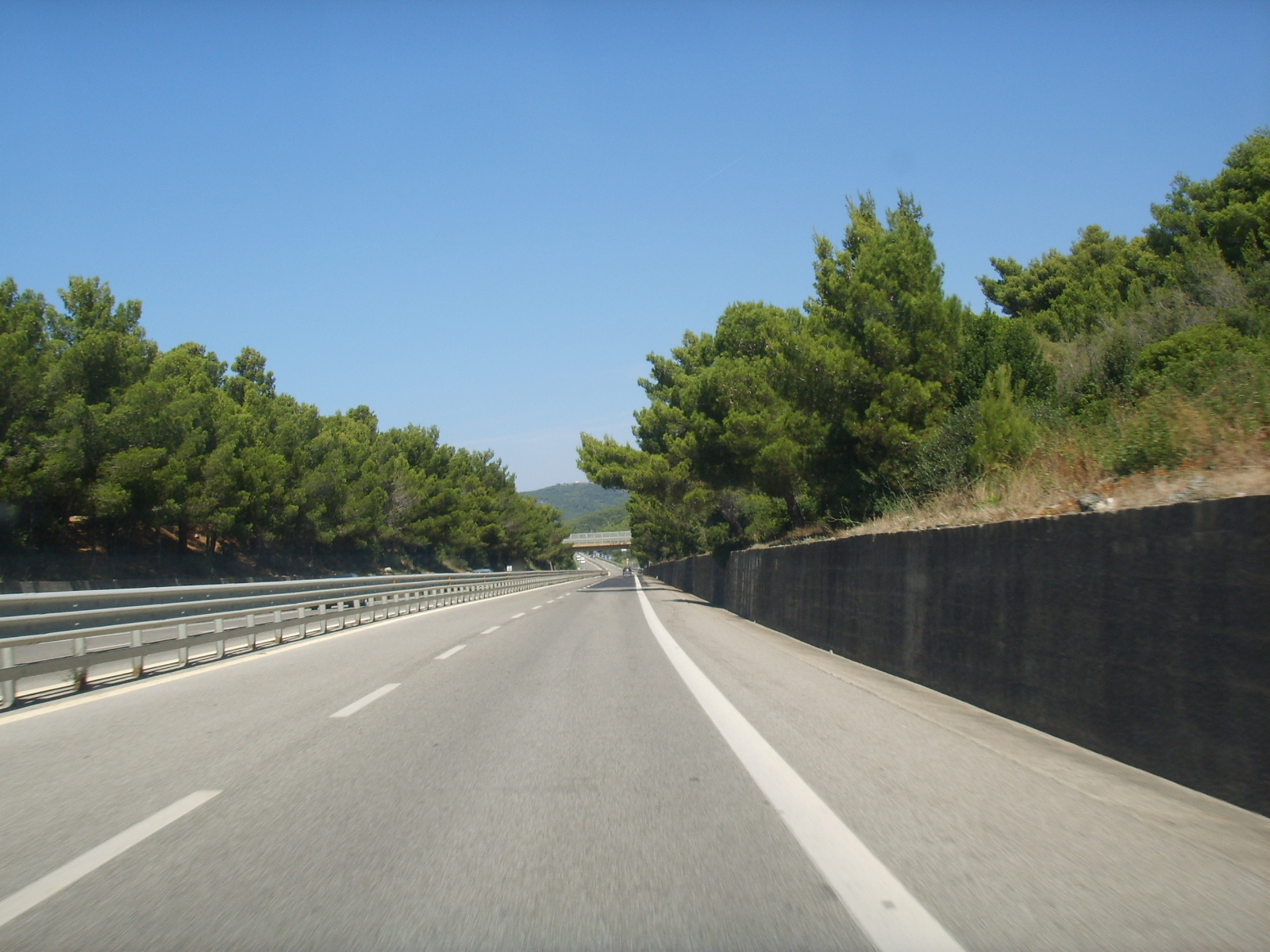
The stretch from Grosseto to Livorno of the Strada statale 1 Via Aurelia is classified as strada extraurbana principale.

Legislative decree 30 April 1992, n. 285, article 2, regarding the "New Italian traffic code", defines strade extraurbane principali in this way:

Road with independent carriageways or separated by an impassable traffic island, each with at least two lanes and paved shoulder on the right, without at-grade intersections, with coordinated access to lateral properties, characterized by the appropriate start and end signs, reserved for the circulation of certain categories of motor vehicles; suitable spaces must be provided for any other categories of users. It must be equipped with special service areas, which include parking spaces, with accesses equipped with deceleration and acceleration lanes.

— Legislative decree 30 April 1992, n. 285, article 2, regarding the "New Italian traffic code"

Strade extraurbane principali are not tolled. All strade extraurbane principali are owned and managed by Anas, and directly controlled by the Italian government or by the regions. The main strade extraurbane principali do not follow a specific nomenclature. In fact, they can be classified from an administrative point of view as state roads, regional roads or provincial roads.

== Regional toll roads ==
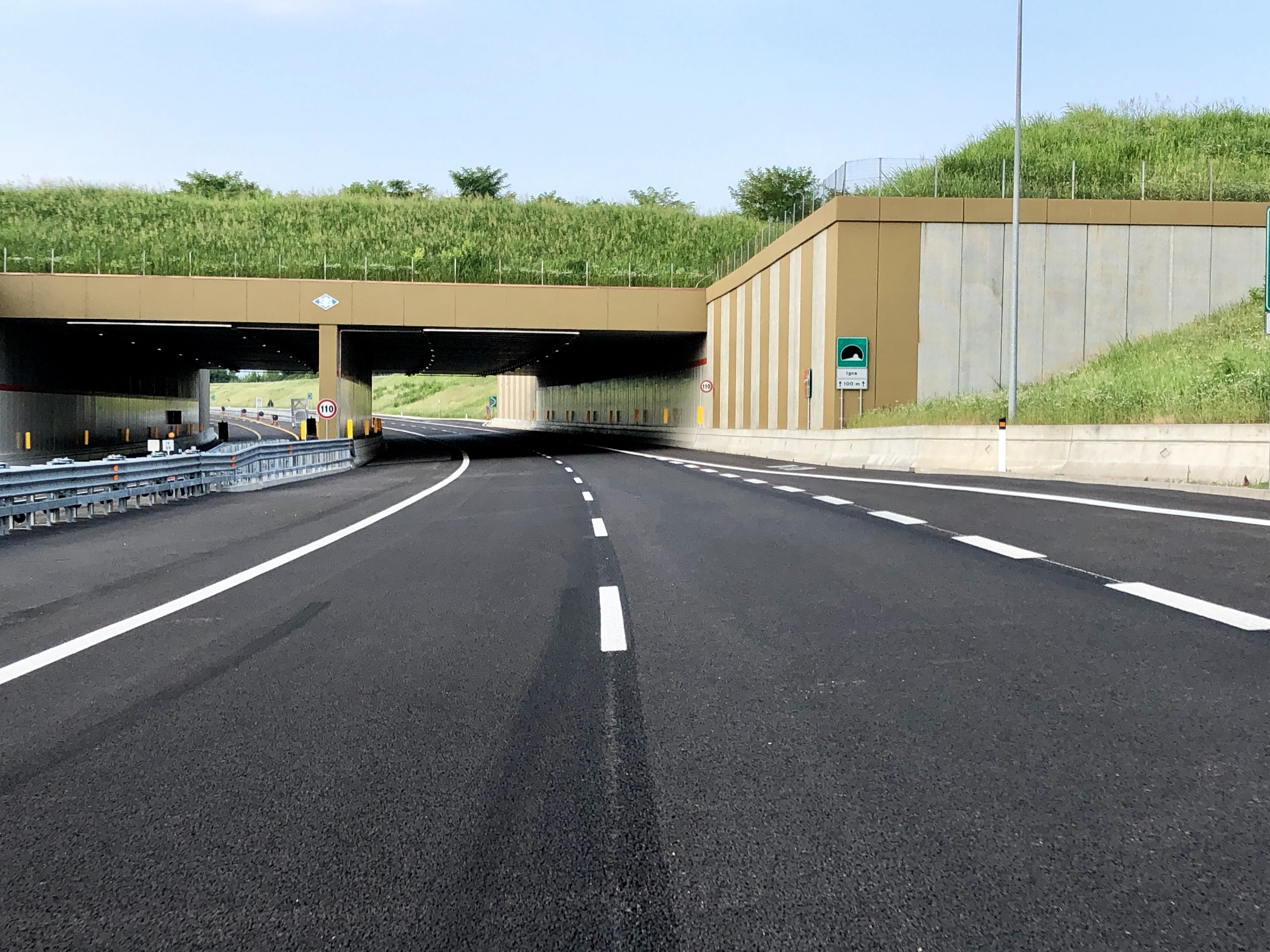
Pedemontana Veneta

In Italy, there is a toll road under a concession from the Veneto region classified with the acronym SPV, with characteristics partly corresponding to a motorway and partly to a strada extraurbana principale, which is defined as a superstrada, i.e. the Pedemontana Veneta.

It is a road that connects Montecchio Maggiore to Spresiano passing through the industrial districts of Malo, Thiene and Schio, through Bassano del Grappa, through Montebelluna and north of Treviso, interconnecting with 3 motorways (from the west: the Autostrada A4, the Autostrada A31 and the Autostrada A27).

Together with the Florence-Pisa-Livorno highway and the Autostrada Catania-Siracusa, it is one of the three roads that has definitively received a classification made up only of letters and not alphanumeric.

Symbol	Name	Route	Manager	Length
	Pedemontana Veneta	Montecchio Maggiore - Spresiano/Villorba	Veneto region	94.7 km (58.8 mi)

== Expansion and strengthening of the network ==
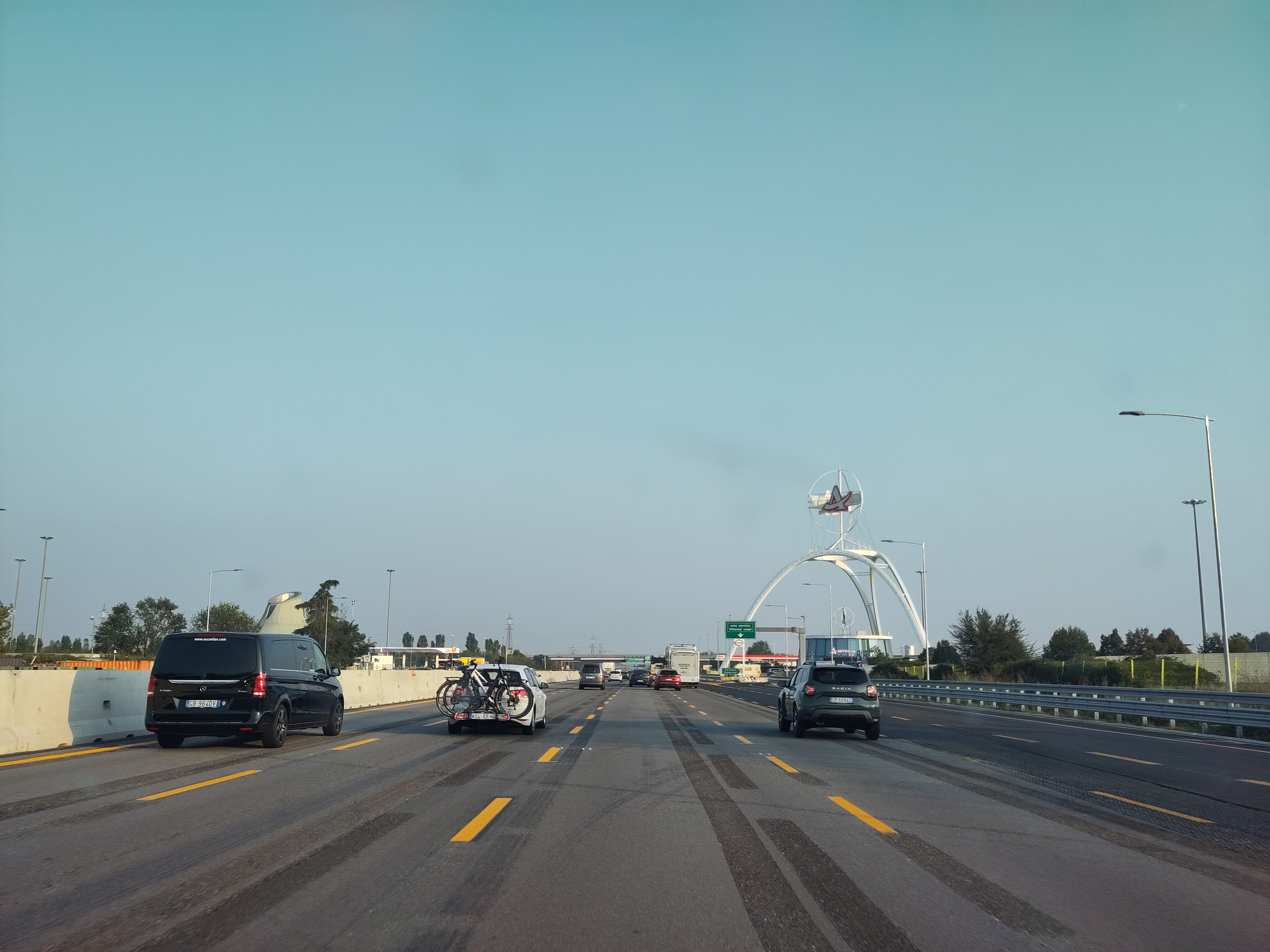
The construction of the fifth lane in each direction along the Autostrada A8 by the end of 2023

In July 2020, the Italian government defined a broad investment plan for infrastructure in Italy, including substantial interventions on the motorway network.

Works such as the TiBre are currently under construction, which consists of the natural continuation of the Autostrada A15 from Parma to the Autostrada A22 near Nogarole Rocca, the completion of the Autostrada A36, Autostrada A59 and Autostrada A60.

However, the section of the Autostrada A1 between the Firenze Sud toll booth and the Valdarno toll booth, the Autostrada A4 in the section between Venice and the junction with the Autostrada A34 at Villesse and in the urban section of Milan, and the Autostrada A8 between the Milan North toll booth and the junction with the Autostrada A9 near Lainate. On the first, the intervention involves the widening to 3 lanes. In the section between Venice and Villesse of the Autostrada A4, the third lane is under construction, while in the Milan section work is underway to create the fourth lane. On the Autostrada A8, the intervention consists of widening the carriageways in both directions from 4 to 5 lanes plus an emergency lane.

However, interventions such as the fourth lane on the Autostrada A1 between Milan and Lodi are currently being approved; the fourth lane on the Autostrada A14 between the branch for Ravenna and the future Ponte Rizzoli toll booth with the creation of the Northern Complanar between the latter and the Tangenziale di Bologna; the Tangenziale di Bologna which involves the widening of the Autostrada A14 in the urban section from two lanes plus dynamic lane to 3 lanes plus emergency lane and the widening of the adjacent Tangenziale di Bologna to 3 lanes plus emergency lane (4 in the most critical sections); the third lane on the Autostrada A22 between Verona and Modena and the third lane between Bolzano Sud and Verona; the Gronda di Genova; the third dynamic lane on the Autostrada A12 between Torrimpietra and Cerveteri and the third lane on the Autostrada A11 between Florence and Pistoia.

== See also ==
- Evolution of motorway construction in European nations
- List of controlled-access highway systems
- Rai isoradio
- Roads in Italy
- Transport in Italy

=== Other Italian roads ===
- State highway (Italy)
- Regional road (Italy)
- Provincial road (Italy)
- Municipal road (Italy)
