= Giap (fuels) =

Petroleum industry distribution

- Product type: Gasoline, lubricants
- Current owner: Gruppo Minardo
- Country: Italy
- Introduced: 1970; 56 years ago
- Markets: National
- Website: Official website

Giap is an Italian commercial brand used for the distribution of fuels.

== Company ==
The brand is owned by the Minardo Group, holding operating mainly in the petroleum industry. Its headquarters are in Modica, in the Free municipal consortium of Ragusa (Sicily).

In 1969 Rosario Minardo began working at a distributor in Modica. The following year, the first plant was built in the Sant’Antonio district (in Modica) and the Giap brand was founded (Gestione Impianti Autonomi Petroli or Autonomous Petrol Plants Management) from Rosario himself, brother of the senator Riccardo Minardo and father of Antonino Minardo, center-right politician and president (in 2007) of the Consortium for the Sicilian Highways. Giap distributors are present in Sicily (since 1970), Calabria, Campania, Lazio, Lombardy and Tuscany.

== Distribution ==
The company also markets LPG, fuels and lubricants for automotive, marine engines and agricultural vehicles. Giap distributors are present in Sicily (since 1970), Calabria, Campania, Lazio, Lombardia and Tuscany. In 2014 Giap was the Sicilian brand with the highest turnover in the oil sector.

== Initiatives ==
The Minardo Group, through the Giap fuel distribution network, in collaboration with the Roman Catholic Diocese of Noto, has been the protagonist of solidarity initiatives based on fundraiser.

== See also ==
- Petroleum
- Oil refinery
