= Autostrada A59 =

Controlled-access highway in Italy

Autostrada A59
- Tangenziale di Como; Como ring road

Route information
- Maintained by ANAS
- Length: 6.6 km (4.1 mi)
- Existed: 2015–present

Major junctions
- Beltway around Como
- West end: Villa Guardia
- A9 in Villa Guardia
- East end: Albese con Cassano

Location
- Country: Italy
- Regions: Lombardy

Highway system
- Roads in Italy; Autostrade; State; Regional; Provincial; Municipal
| ← A 58 | → A 60 |

Autostrada A59 or Tangenziale di Como ("Como ring road") is an autostrada (Italian for "motorway") 6.6 kilometres (4.1 mi) long in Italy located in the region of Lombardy and tangent to the city of Como in its southern area. The first part of about 3 km was opened to traffic on 23 May 2015. As of 2022, Autostrada A59 stands as the shortest-length autostrada in Italy.

== Route ==
TANGENZIALE DI COMO; Autostrada A59
| Exit | ↓km↓ | ↑km↑ | Province | European Route |
| Villa Guardia | 0.0 km (0 mi) | 6.6 km (4.1 mi) | CO | -- |
| Autostrada A9 | 0.8 km (0.50 mi) | 5.8 km (3.6 mi) | CO | -- |
| Como Est | 2.9 km (1.8 mi) | 3.7 km (2.3 mi) | CO | -- |
| Albese con Cassano; Briantea | 6.6 km (4.1 mi) | 0.0 km (0 mi) | CO | -- |

== See also ==
- Autostrade of Italy
- Roads in Italy
- Transport in Italy

=== Other Italian roads ===
- State highways (Italy)
- Regional road (Italy)
- Provincial road (Italy)
- Municipal road (Italy)
