= Autostrada A2 (Italy, 1962–1988) =

Former controlled-access highway in Italy

== History ==
It was called A2 from the time during its construction (1956–1964) until 21 July 1988, when the direct connection link between the A2 and the A1 from Milan to Rome was completed. The renaming of the whole stretch followed soon after. The direct connection allows a way to avoid the Grande Raccordo Anulare of Rome (the A90 highway).

== Motorway of the Mediterranean (2017) ==
On 22 December 2016 ANAS announced that the A3 highway, along the Salerno - Reggio Calabria section and a section of the RA2 would change its name to A2 "Autostrada del Mediterraneo" (literally "Motorway of the Mediterranean").

The new name was officially put into effect by a ministerial decree on 13 June 2017.
