= Consorzio per le Autostrade Siciliane =

Italian transport company

- Type: Public benefit corporation
- Industry: Road transport
- Founded: 1997
- Founder: Italian Government
- Headquarters: Messina, Italy
- Products: Motorways construction and maintenance
- Owner: Sicilian region
- Number of employees: 382 (2014)
- Website: http://www.autostradesiciliane.it/

Consorzio per le Autostrade Siciliane (English: Consortium for the Sicilian Highways) is an Italian company that manages two motorways in Sicily: A18 and A20.

== Managed routes ==
- A20 Messina-Palermo, 181.8 kilometres (113.0 mi)
- A18 Messina-Catania, 76.8 kilometres (47.7 mi)
- A18 Siracusa-Gela, 41.9 kilometres (26.0 mi)

The total managed is 300.5 kilometres (186.7 mi).

== Gallery ==
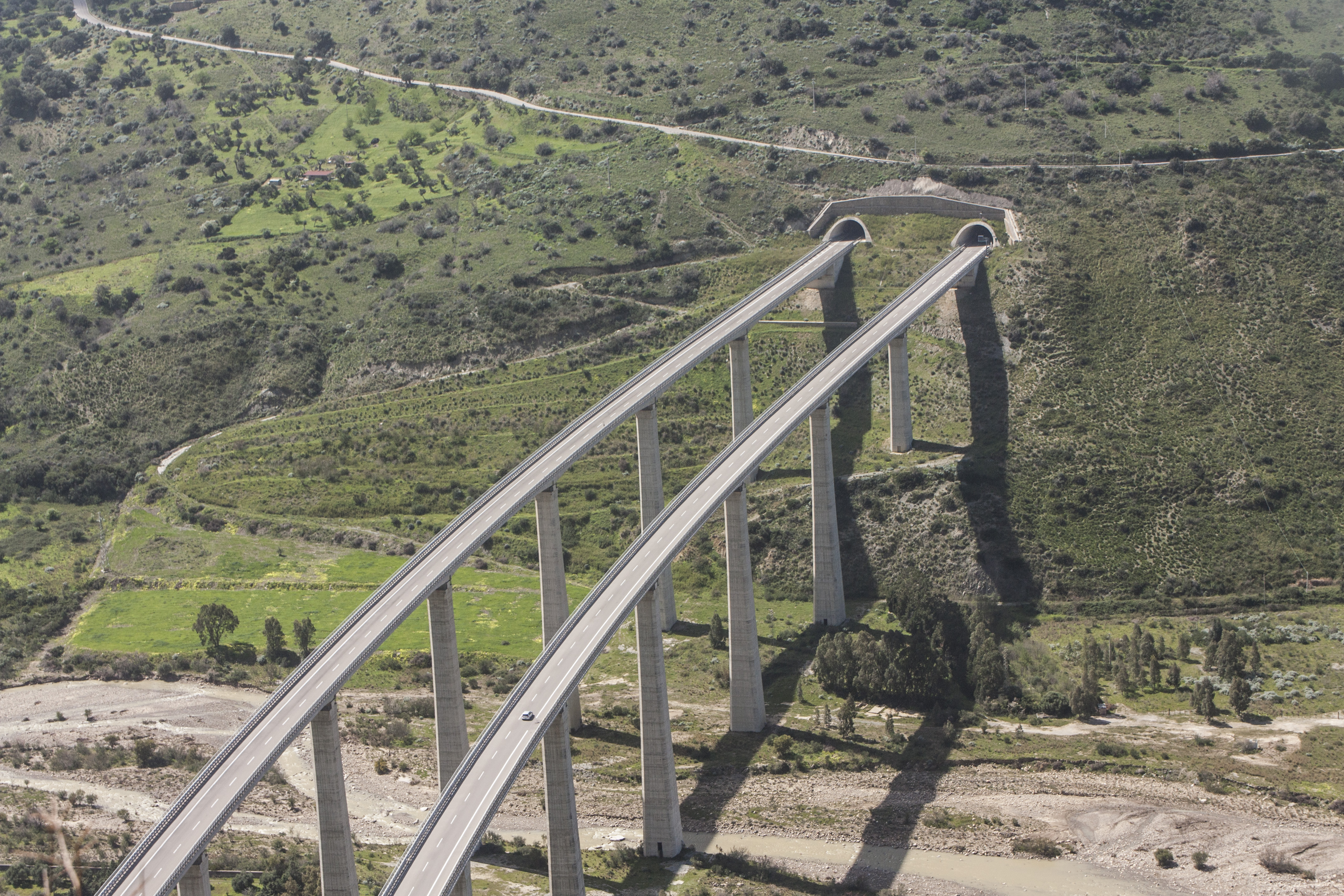
A20 Messina-Palermo torrent Tusa zone.

A18 Messina-Catania map.

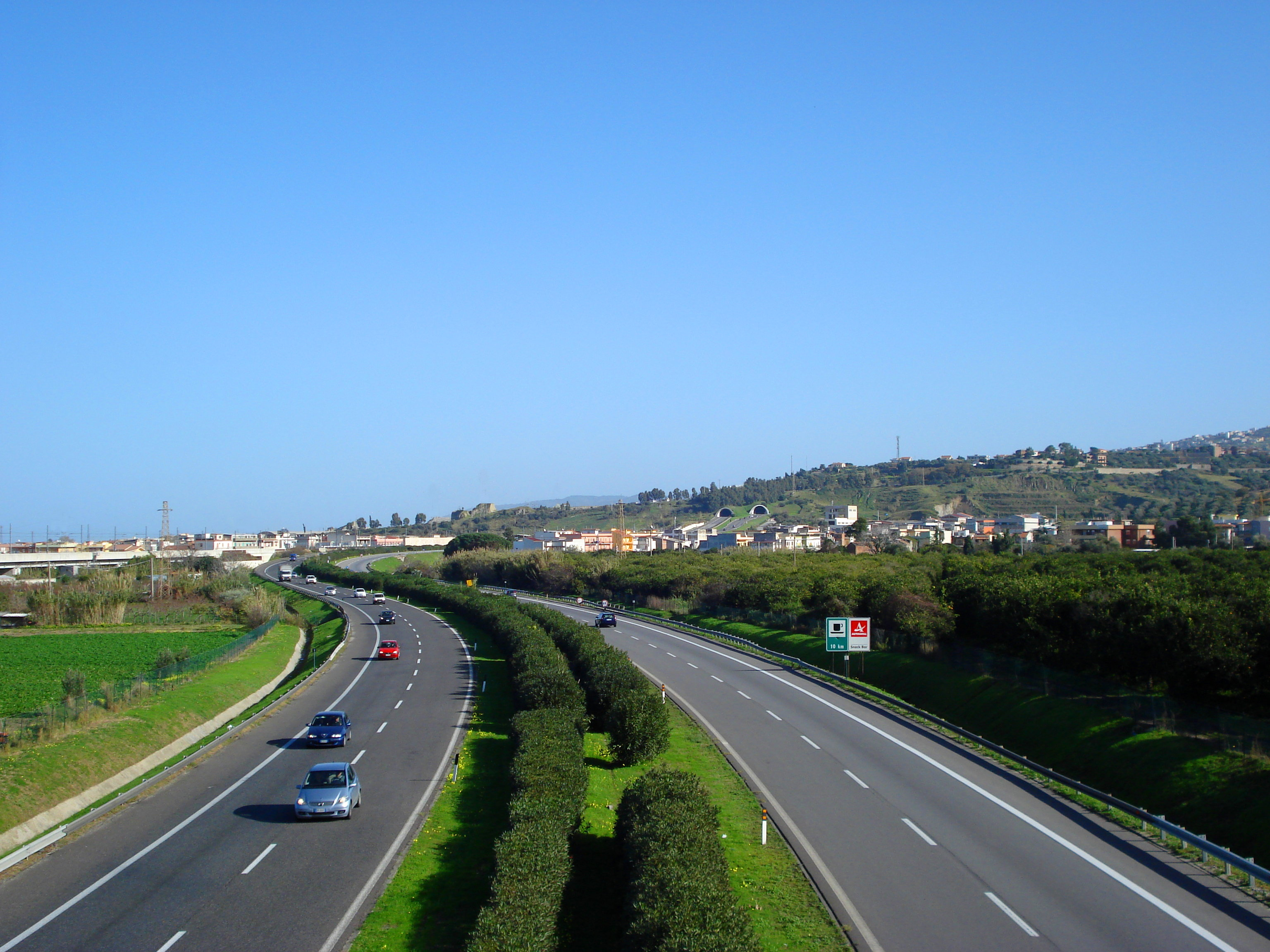
A20 near Torregrotta.

== Related pages ==
- Autostrade per l'Italia
- ANAS
- Giap (fuels)
