= Bargagli-Ferriere Tunnel =

Road tunnel in Italy

Coordinates: 44°26′18″N 9°06′16″E

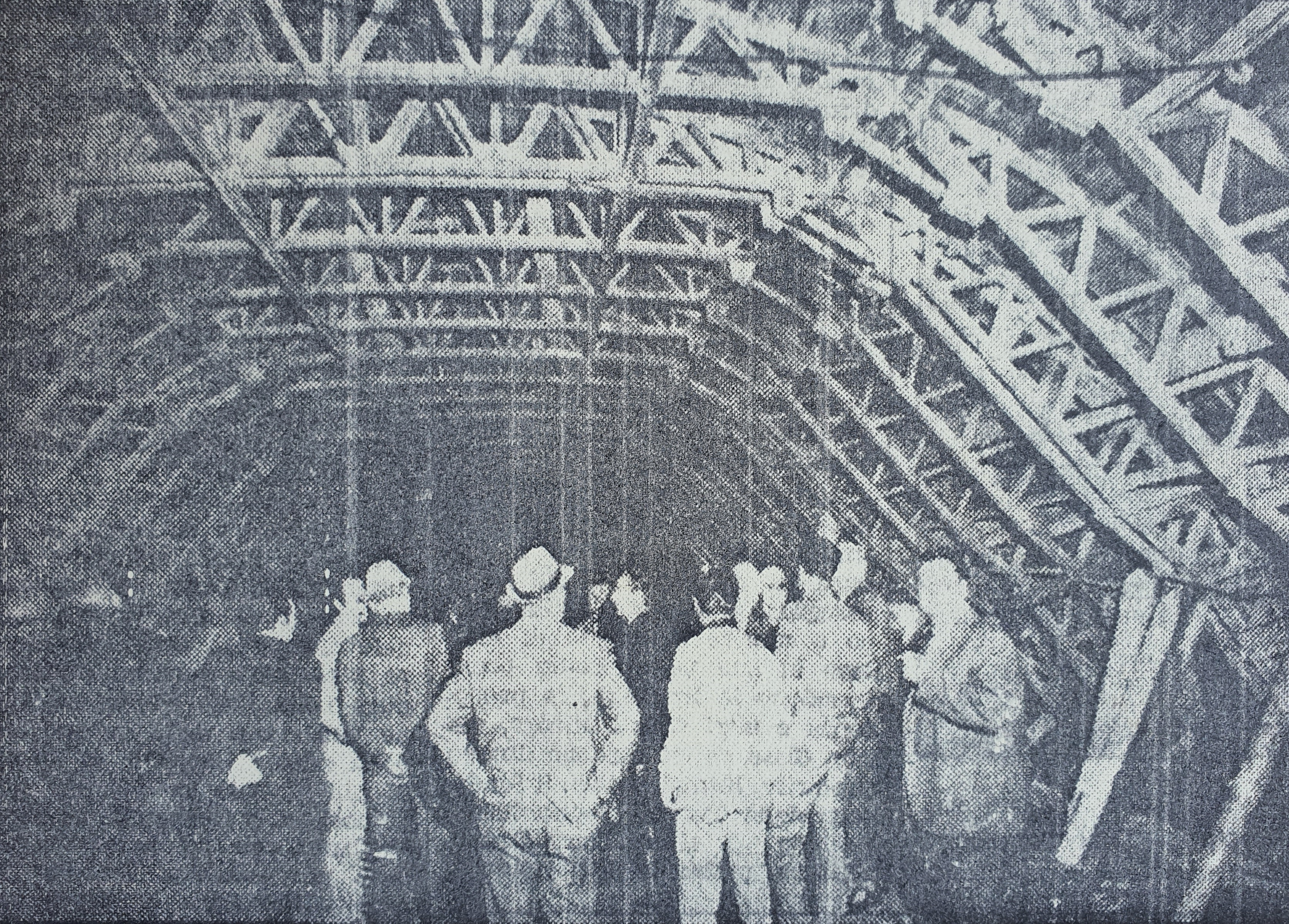
The Bargagli-Ferriere tunnel under construction

The Bargagli-Ferriere Tunnel is a 2,030-metre (6,660 ft) tunnel located on the SP 225 road near Genoa, Italy. It was opened on 15 June 1971 as part of a 4,220-metre (13,850 ft) toll road originally numbered T3. It was the first tunnel to be built with a jet-fan longitudinal ventilation system.

On 22 July 1989 this road, built to complement the SS 225, was renumbered and part of the SS 225 was renumbered SP 77. The designation T3 is no longer used.
