= Autostrada A12 (Italy) =

Controlled-access highway in Italy

Autostrada A12
- Autostrada Azzurra; Blue motorway

Route information
- Part of E80
- Maintained by ANAS
- Length: 275.4 km (171.1 mi)
- Existed: 1967–present

Major junctions
- North end: Genoa
- A7 and A10 in Genoa; A15 in Albiano Magra; A11 in Pisa; A1 in Monte Romano; Grande Raccordo Anulare and A1 in Fiumicino and in Rome
- South end: Rome

Location
- Country: Italy
- Regions: Liguria, Tuscany, Lazio

Highway system
- Roads in Italy; Autostrade; State; Regional; Provincial; Municipal
← A 11	→ A 13

The Autostrada A12 or Autostrada Azzurra ('blue motorway') is an autostrada (Italian for 'motorway') 275.4 kilometres (171.1 mi) long in Italy located in the regions of Liguria, Tuscany and Lazio composed of two unconnected parts. The first one connects Genoa and San Pietro in Palazzi, the second connects Tarquinia and Rome. The road is one of the motorways on the Italian west coast. It is a part of the E80 European route.

== Overview ==
Plans to build the remaining stretch have existed for long time. A "superstrada" (an almost motorway-like road, with 2 separate carriageways and interchanges) with a speed limit of 110 km/h (68 mph) exists between San Pietro in Palazzi and Grosseto, but the present road between Grosseto and Tarquinia has 90 km/h (56 mph) speed limit, with long parts of single carriageway and even some parts of 2-lane road. The 2 proposed solutions are an entirely new motorway (with higher impact on the environment), and the upgrade to motorway standard of the present road (more environmentally friendly).

On 17 May 2017 the European Commission announced that it would be taking legal action against the government of Italy for awarding an extension of its A12 motorway concession contract to Società Autostrada Tirrenica p.A without undertaking a competitive procurement exercise in accordance with EU procurement regulations.

== Route ==
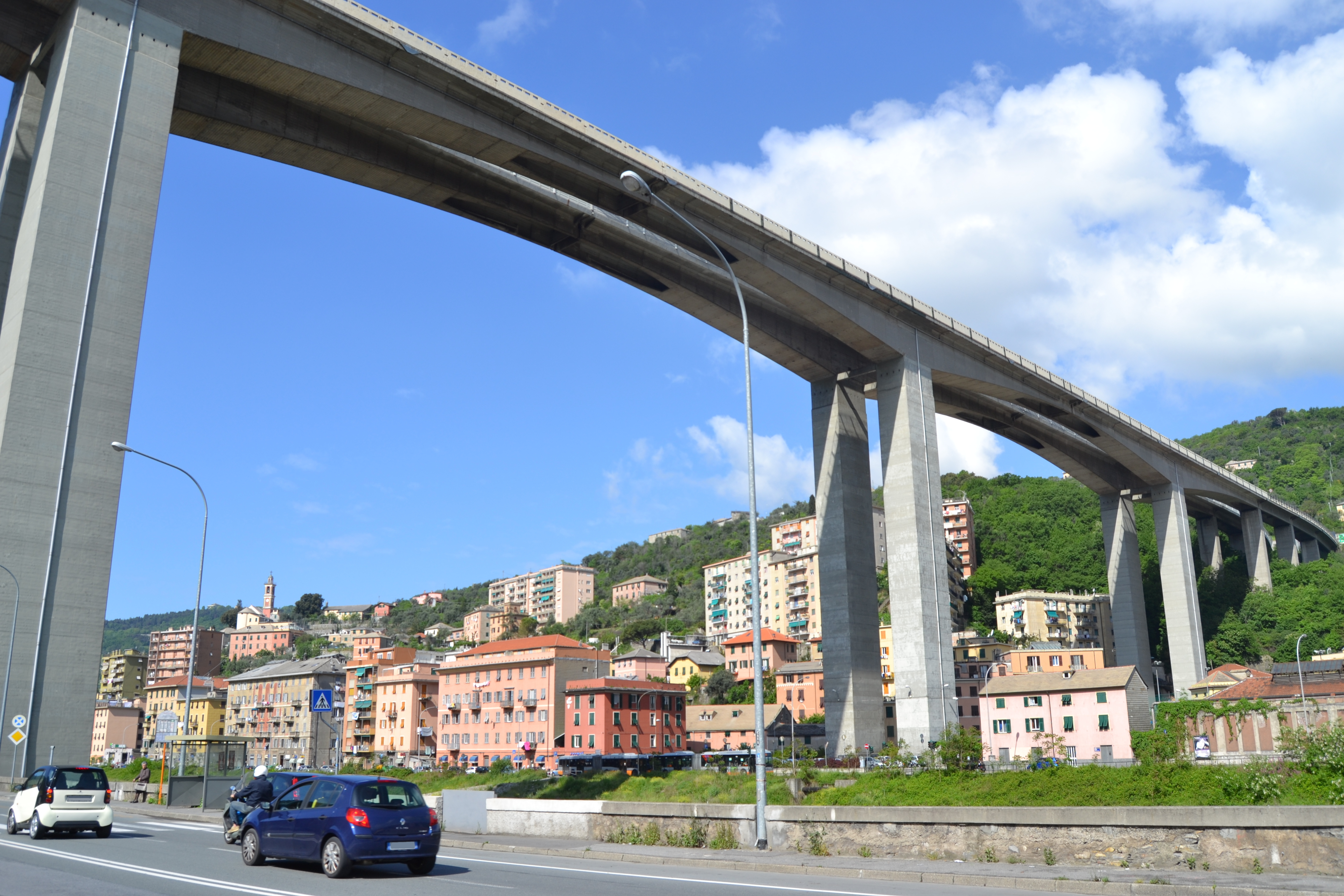
Autostrada A12 in Genoa

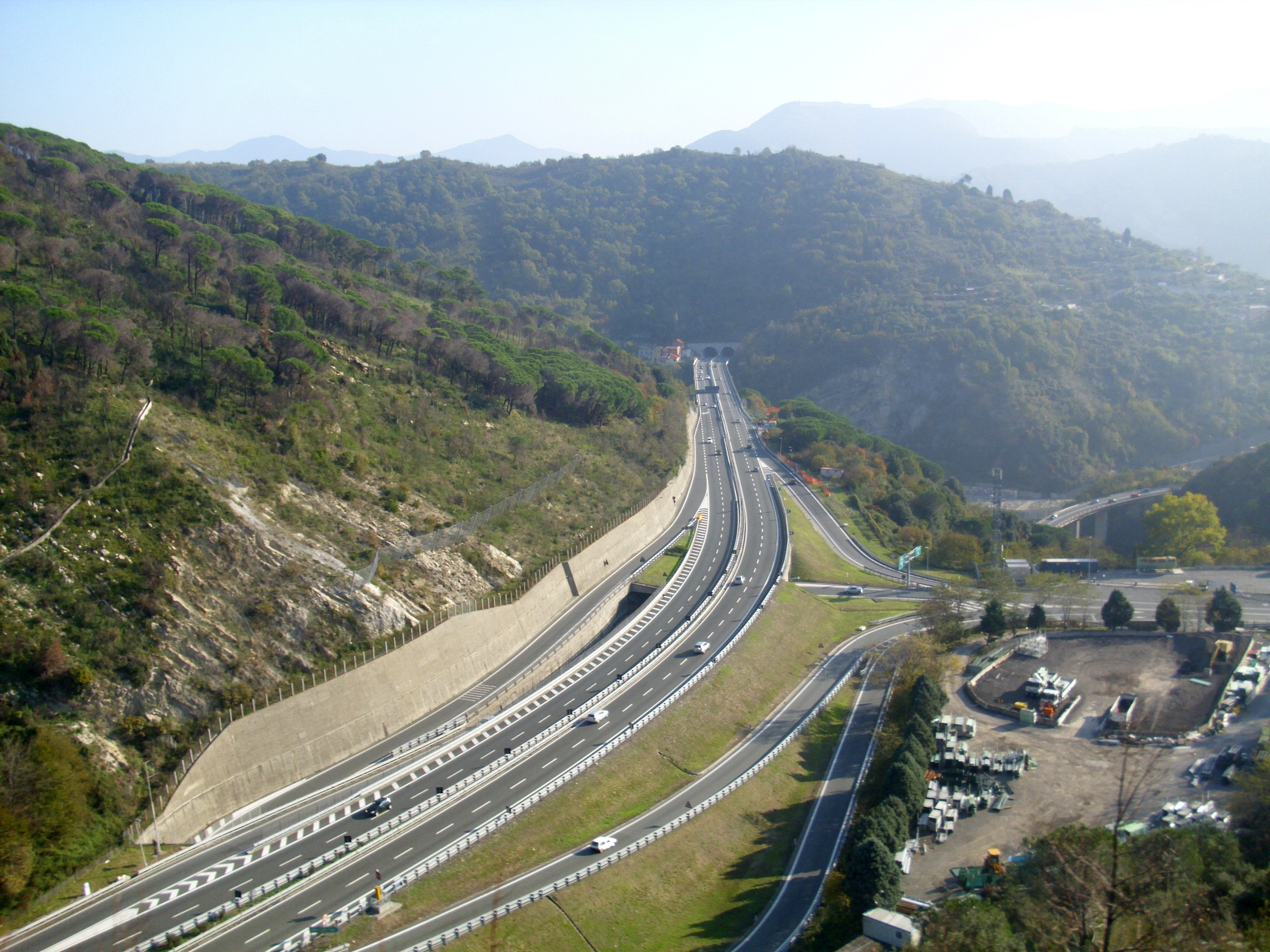
Autostrada A12 near Genoa

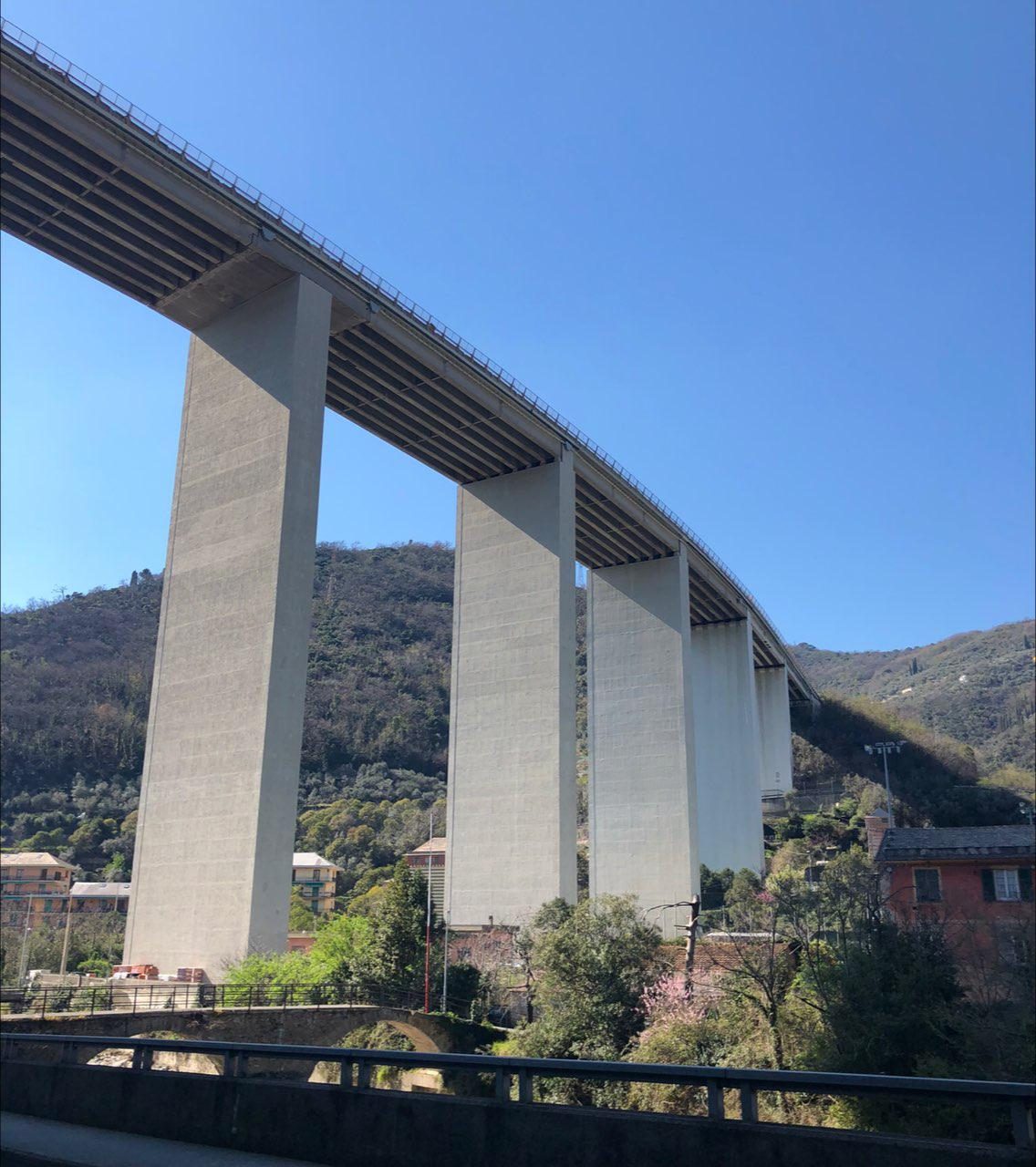
Autostrada A12 near Recco

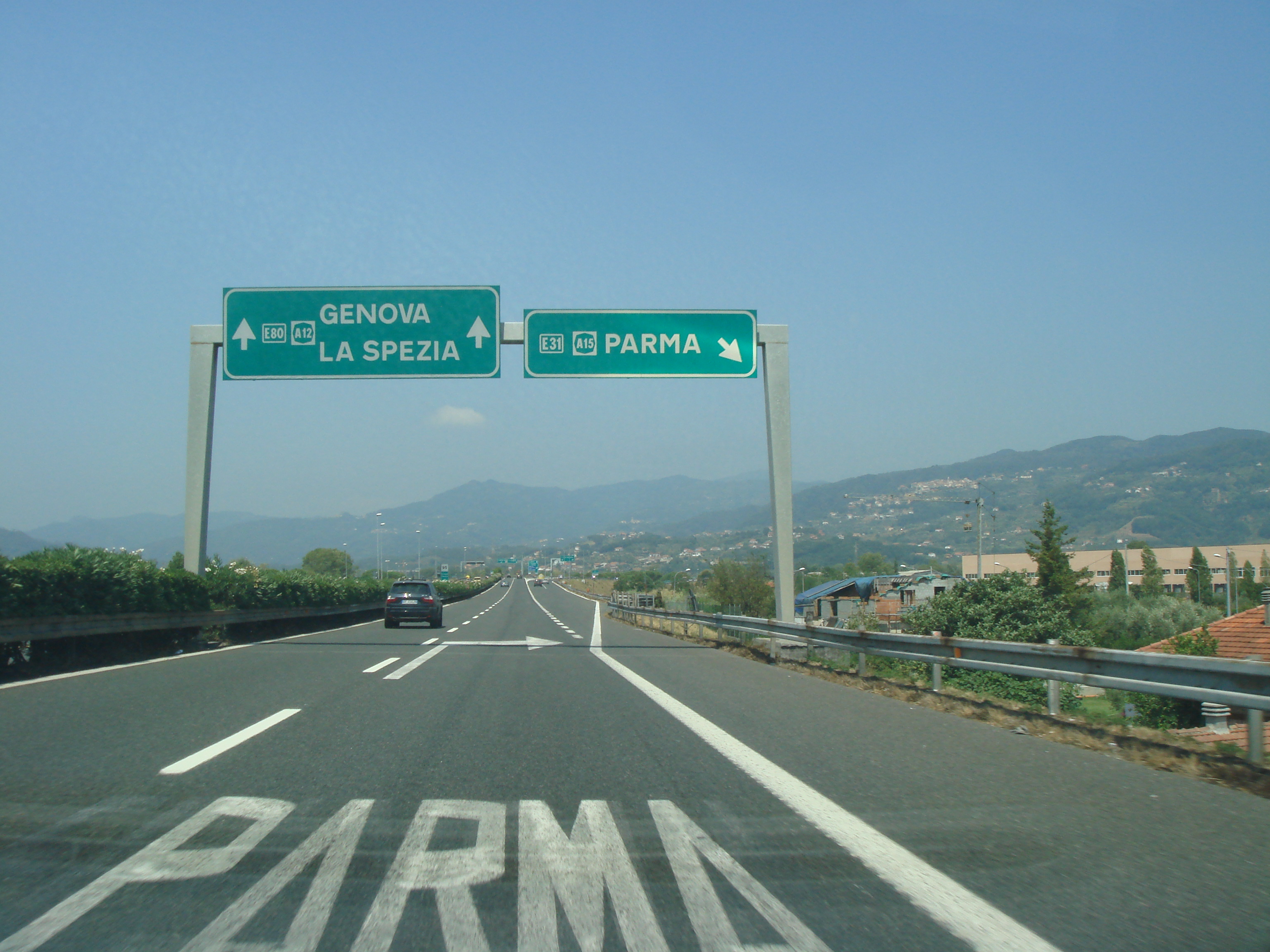
Autostrada A12 near Santo Stefano di Magra

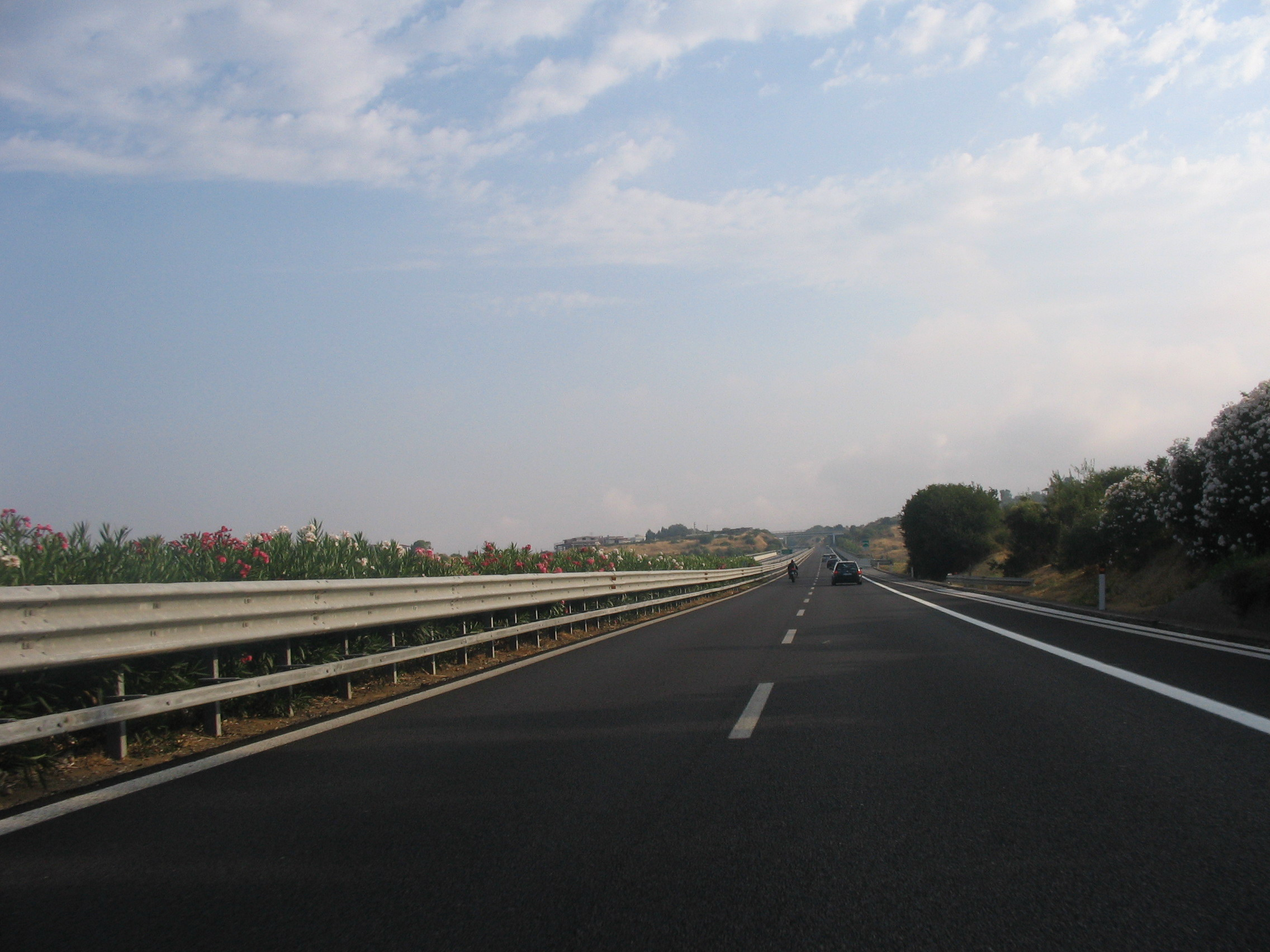
Autostrada A12 near Civitavecchia

GENOVA – ROMA; Autostrada Azzurra
Exit	↓km↓	↑km↑	Province	European route
Milano - Genova Ovest; Ventimiglia; Genoa Christopher Columbus Airport	0.0 km (0 mi)	463.7 km (288.1 mi)	GE	E80
Genova Est	4.2 km (2.6 mi)	459.5 km (285.5 mi)	GE	E80
Genova Nervi	11.5 km (7.1 mi)	452.2 km (281.0 mi)	GE	E80
Rest area "Sant'Ilario"	14.5 km (9.0 mi)	455.2 km (282.8 mi)	GE	E80
Recco	22.8 km (14.2 mi)	440.9 km (274.0 mi)	GE	E80
Rapallo	28.4 km (17.6 mi)	435.3 km (270.5 mi)	GE	E80
Chiavari	38.3 km (23.8 mi)	425.4 km (264.3 mi)	GE	E80
Lavagna	41.1 km (25.5 mi)	422.6 km (262.6 mi)	GE	E80
Sestri Levante	48.7 km (30.3 mi)	415.0 km (257.9 mi)	GE	E80
Rest area "Riviera"	48.8 km (30.3 mi)	414.9 km (257.8 mi)	GE	E80
Deiva Marina	60.5 km (37.6 mi)	403.2 km (250.5 mi)	SP	E80
Carrodano - Levanto	70.1 km (43.6 mi)	393.6 km (244.6 mi)	SP	E80
Brugnato - Borghetto Vara	75.8 km (47.1 mi)	387.9 km (241.0 mi)	SP	E80
Rest area "Brugnato"	76.8 km (47.7 mi)	386.9 km (240.4 mi)	SP	E80
Albiano Magra - Ceparana	93.0 km (57.8 mi)	370.7 km (230.3 mi)	SP	E80
La Spezia - Parma Port of La Spezia; Santo Stefano di Magra; Cinque Terre National Park; Porto Venere - Lerici	94.4 km (58.7 mi)	369.3 km (229.5 mi)	SP	E80
Rest area "Magra"	96.5 km (60.0 mi)	367.2 km (228.2 mi)	SP	E80
Sarzana Ancient Luna	101.6 km (63.1 mi)	362.1 km (225.0 mi)	SP	E80
Carrara	110.0 km (68.4 mi)	353.7 km (219.8 mi)	MS	E80
Massa	116.4 km (72.3 mi)	347.3 km (215.8 mi)	MS	E80
Versilia	127.9 km (79.5 mi)	335.8 km (208.7 mi)	LU	E80
Rest area "Versilia"	131.2 km (81.5 mi)	332.5 km (206.6 mi)	LU	E80
Lucca-Viareggio	135.7 km (84.3 mi)	328.0 km (203.8 mi)	LU	E80
Firenze; Pisa nord	151.0 km (93.8 mi)	312.7 km (194.3 mi)	PI	E80
Pisa Centro; SGC FI-PI-LI; Pisa International Airport	161.6 km (100.4 mi)	302.1 km (187.7 mi)	PI	E80
Rest area "Castagnolo"	163.5 km (101.6 mi)	300.2 km (186.5 mi)	PI	E80
Livorno; Port of Livorno; SGC Variante Aurelia; SGC FI-PI-LI	170.7 km (106.1 mi)	293.0 km (182.1 mi)	PI	E80
Collesalvetti; SGC FI-PI-LI	177.8 km (110.5 mi)	285.9 km (177.7 mi)	LI	E80
Rest area "Savalano" (Note: Only in the direction of Rome.)	196.0 km (121.8 mi)	--	LI	E80
Rest area "Fine" (Note: Only in the direction of Genoa.)	--	263.6 km (163.8 mi)	LI	E80
Rosignano Marittimo; SGC Variante Aurelia Livorno	205.9 km (127.9 mi)	257.8 km (160.2 mi)	LI	E80
Toll gate Rosignano	206.9 km (128.6 mi)	256.8 km (159.6 mi)	LI	E80
End of motorway section	210.0 km (130.5 mi)	253.7 km (157.6 mi)	LI	E80
Cecina Nord	--	--	LI	E80
Cecina Centro di Val di Cecina; Volterra	--	--	LI	E80
Cecina Sud - La California	--	--	LI	E80
Castagneto - Donoratico	--	--	LI	E80
San Vincenzo nord	--	--	LI	E80
San Vincenzo sud	--	--	LI	E80
Rest area "Venturina"	--	--	LI	E80
|Venturina - Piombino; Via Val di Cornia - Piombino; Port of Piombino; Ferries to Elba and Tuscan Archipelago; Piombino steel plant	--	--	LI	E80
Rest area "Campiglia"	--	--	LI	E80
Vignale Riotorto	--	--	LI	E80
Follonica nord	--	--	GR	E80
Follonica est - Massa Marittima	--	--	GR	E80
Scarlino	--	--	GR	E80
Gavorrano	--	--	GR	E80
Gavorrano scalo	--	--	GR	E80
Giuncarico	--	--	GR	E80
Braccagni	--	--	GR	E80
Rest area "Braccagni"	--	--	GR	E80
Rest area "Grosseto"	--	--	GR	E80
Grosseto nord	--	--	GR	E80
Grosseto Roselle di Paganico - Siena; Raccordo Firenze-Siena; Senese Aretina; Milano-Napoli; Perugia	--	--	GR	E80
Grosseto Est; Industrial area	--	--	GR	E80
Grosseto sud	--	--	GR	E80
Rest area "Rispescia"	--	--	GR	E80
Fonteblanda	--	--	GR	E80
Rest area "Capalbio Ovest"	--	--	GR	E80
Capalbio	--	--	GR	E80
Rest area "Capalbio Est" (Note: Northern carriageway only)	--	--	GR	E80
Pescia Romana	--	--	VT	E80
Centrale Enel	--	--	VT	E80
Montalto di Castro	--	--	VT	E80
Riva dei Tarquini	--	--	VT	E80
Start of motorway section	384.2 km (238.7 mi)	79.3 km (49.3 mi)	VT	E80
Toll gate Tarquinia	385.7 km (239.7 mi)	77.8 km (48.3 mi)	VT	E80
Tarquinia	387.9 km (241.0 mi)	75.6 km (47.0 mi)	VT	E80
Monte Romano; Orte-Viterbo; Milano-Napoli; Terni-Perugia-Cesena-Ravenna	393.0 km (244.2 mi)	70.5 km (43.8 mi)	VT	E80
Rest area "Corneto"	396.9 km (246.6 mi)	--	VT	E80
Civitavecchia Porto; Via Aurelia	397.6 km (247.1 mi)	65.1 km (40.5 mi)	VT	E80
Rest area "Tolfa"	--	59.5 km (37.0 mi)	RM	E80
Civitavecchia Nord; Port of Civitavecchia	406.2 km (252.4 mi)	57.5 km (35.7 mi)	RM	E80
Toll gate Aurelia	411.4 km (255.6 mi)	52.3 km (32.5 mi)	RM	E80
Civitavecchia Sud	411.5 km (255.7 mi)	52.2 km (32.4 mi)	RM	E80
Santa Marinella - Santa Severa	422.6 km (262.6 mi)	41.1 km (25.5 mi)	RM	E80
Rest area "Tirreno"	424.5 km (263.8 mi)	39.2 km (24.4 mi)	RM	E80
Cerveteri - Ladispoli	435.8 km (270.8 mi)	27.9 km (17.3 mi)	RM	E80
Torrimpietra; Via Aurelia; Firenze; Grande Raccordo Anulare	448.8 km (278.9 mi)	14.9 km (9.3 mi)	RM	E80
Toll gate Roma Ovest	452.1 km (280.9 mi)	11.6 km (7.2 mi)	RM	E80
Maccarese - Fregene	452.4 km (281.1 mi)	11.3 km (7.0 mi)	RM	E80
Rest area "Arrone"	455.2 km (282.8 mi)	8.5 km (5.3 mi)	RM	E80
Roma - Fiumicino; Napoli; Grande Raccordo Anulare; Rome Fiumicino Airport; Rome Ciampino Airport; Rome Urbe Airport	463.7 km (288.1 mi)	0.0 km (0 mi)	RM	E80

=== A11/A12 Lucca-Viareggio connection ===
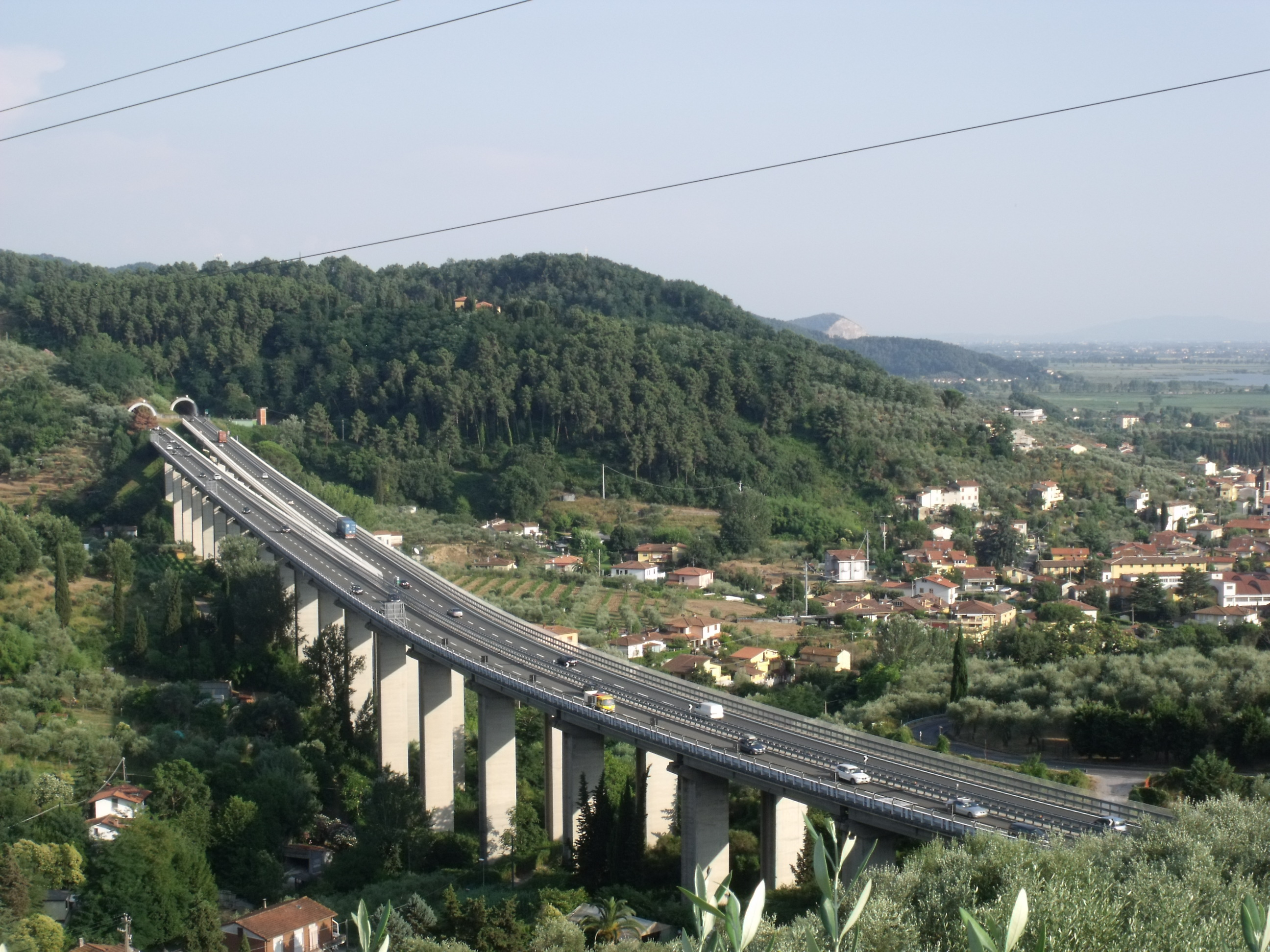
A11/A12 Lucca-Viareggio connection near Massarosa

AUTOSTRADA A11/A12; Lucca - Viareggio connection
Exit	↓km↓	↑km↑	Province	European route
Firenze-Pisa	0.0 km (0 mi)	18.2 km (11.3 mi)	LU	--
Lucca Ovest	0.7 km (0.43 mi)	17.5 km (10.9 mi)	LU	--
Rest area "Monte Quiesa" (Note: Only for traffic in the direction of the A12)	9.7 km (6.0 mi)	8.5 km (5.3 mi)	LU	--
Massarosa	12.0 km (7.5 mi)	6.2 km (3.9 mi)	LU	--
Genova - Roma	18.0 km (11.2 mi)	0.2 km (0.12 mi)	LU	--
Viareggio	18.2 km (11.3 mi)	0.0 km (0 mi)	LU	--

=== Livorno connection ===
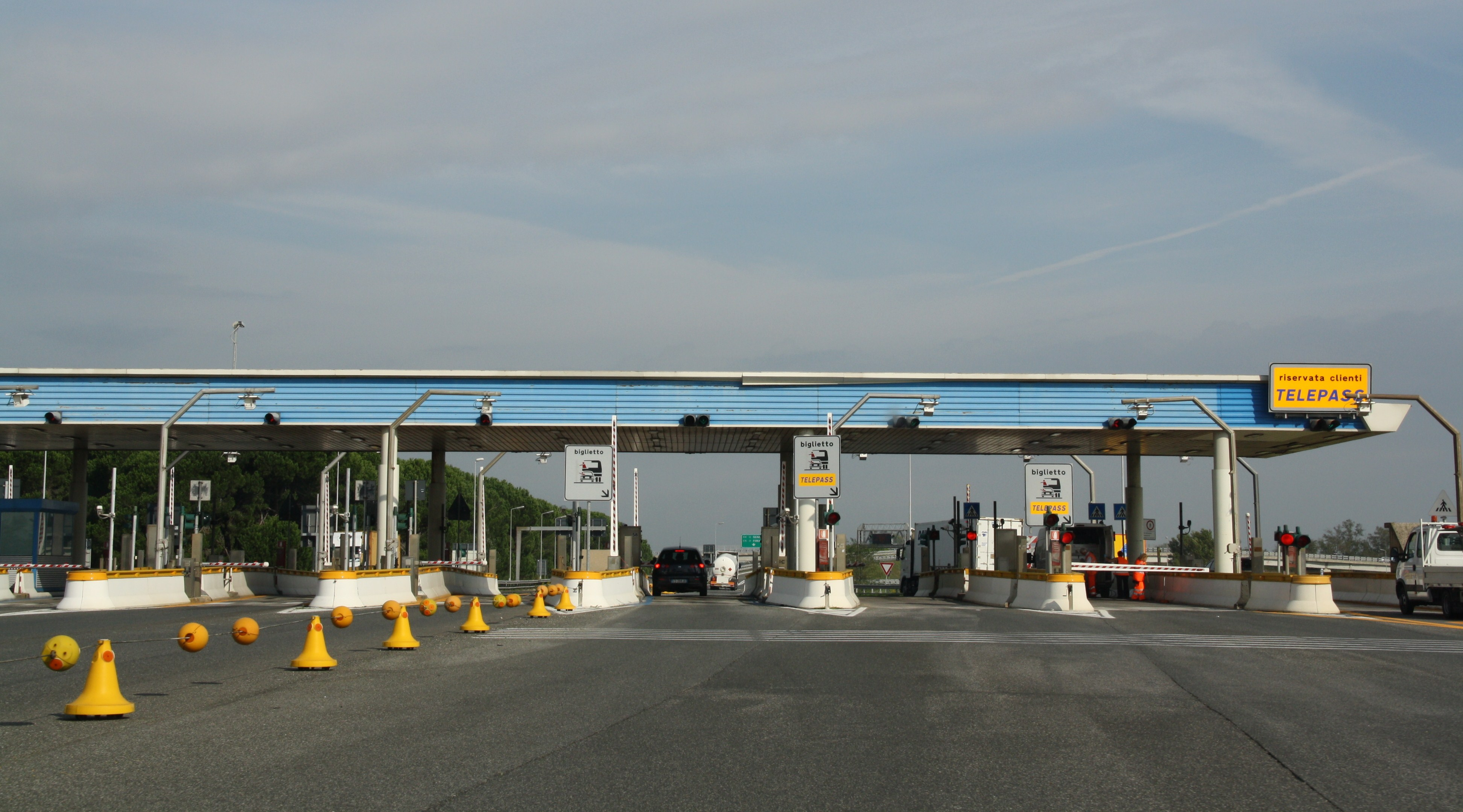
Toll gate Livorno

DIRAMAZIONE LIVORNO; Livorno connection
Exit	↓km↓	↑km↑	Province
Genova-Rosignano	0.0 km (0 mi)	4.5 km (2.8 mi)	PI
Toll gate Livorno	0.8 km (0.50 mi)	3.7 km (2.3 mi)	PI
Via Aurelia; Stagno Nord	1.3 km (0.81 mi)	3.2 km (2.0 mi)	PI
SGC FI-PI-LI; Stagno Sud	3.8 km (2.4 mi)	0.4 km (0.25 mi)	LI
Variante Aurelia	4.5 km (2.8 mi)	0.0 km (0 mi)	LI

== See also ==
- Autostrade of Italy
- Roads in Italy
- Transport in Italy

=== Other Italian roads ===
- State highways (Italy)
- Regional road (Italy)
- Provincial road (Italy)
- Municipal road (Italy)
