= Strada statale 1 Via Aurelia =

State highway in Italy

State Highway 1
- Strada statale 1
- Via Aurelia

Route information
- Part of E80
- Maintained by ANAS
- Length: 697.3 km (433.3 mi)
- Existed: 1928–present

Major junctions
- South end: Rome
- Grande Raccordo Anulare in Rome; A12 in Fiumicino; A12 in Ladispoli; A12 in Civitavecchia; A12 in Tarquinia; A12 in Rosignano Marittimo; A12 in Livorno; A12 in Cecina; A12 in Stagno; A11 in Migliarino; A12 in Migliarino; A12 in Viareggio; A12 in Sarzana; A15 in Vezzano Ligure
- North end: Ventimiglia

Location
- Country: Italy
- Regions: Lazio, Tuscany, Liguria

Highway system
- Roads in Italy; Autostrade; State; Regional; Provincial; Municipal
→ SS 2

Strada statale 1 Via Aurelia (SS 1) is an Italian state highway 697.3 kilometres (433.3 mi) long in Italy located in the regions of Lazio, Tuscany and Liguria. It is one of the most important state highways in Italy and derives from an ancient Roman consular road, the Via Aurelia. It connects Rome with France following the coast of Tyrrhenian Sea and Ligurian Sea and touching nine provincial capitals as well as important tourist locations. It constitutes a section of the European route E80 from Tarquinia to Rosignano Marittimo.

== History ==
The SS 1 was instituted in 1928 with the following description: "Rome – Civitavecchia – Grosseto – Livorno – Pisa – Genoa – Imperia – Ventimiglia – French border. The denomination derives from the homonymous ancient Roman road, although it follows in part the routes of other Roman roads, such as the Via Julia Augusta. In the 1980s and the 1990s, due to the heavy traffic the road had to support, a second road was constructed with 2 lanes (plus an emergency lane) in each direction, parallel to the route of the original route, in the section between Grosseto and Quercianella. The Aurelia is substantially an alternative to the A12, except for the section from Tarquinia to Rosignano Marittimo, in which the A12 does not currently run. As a result of a decree in 1999, the section had been ceded from ANAS to the region of Liguria and its provinces; however, due to the excessive cost of maintenance, it later returned under the control of ANAS.

== Route ==
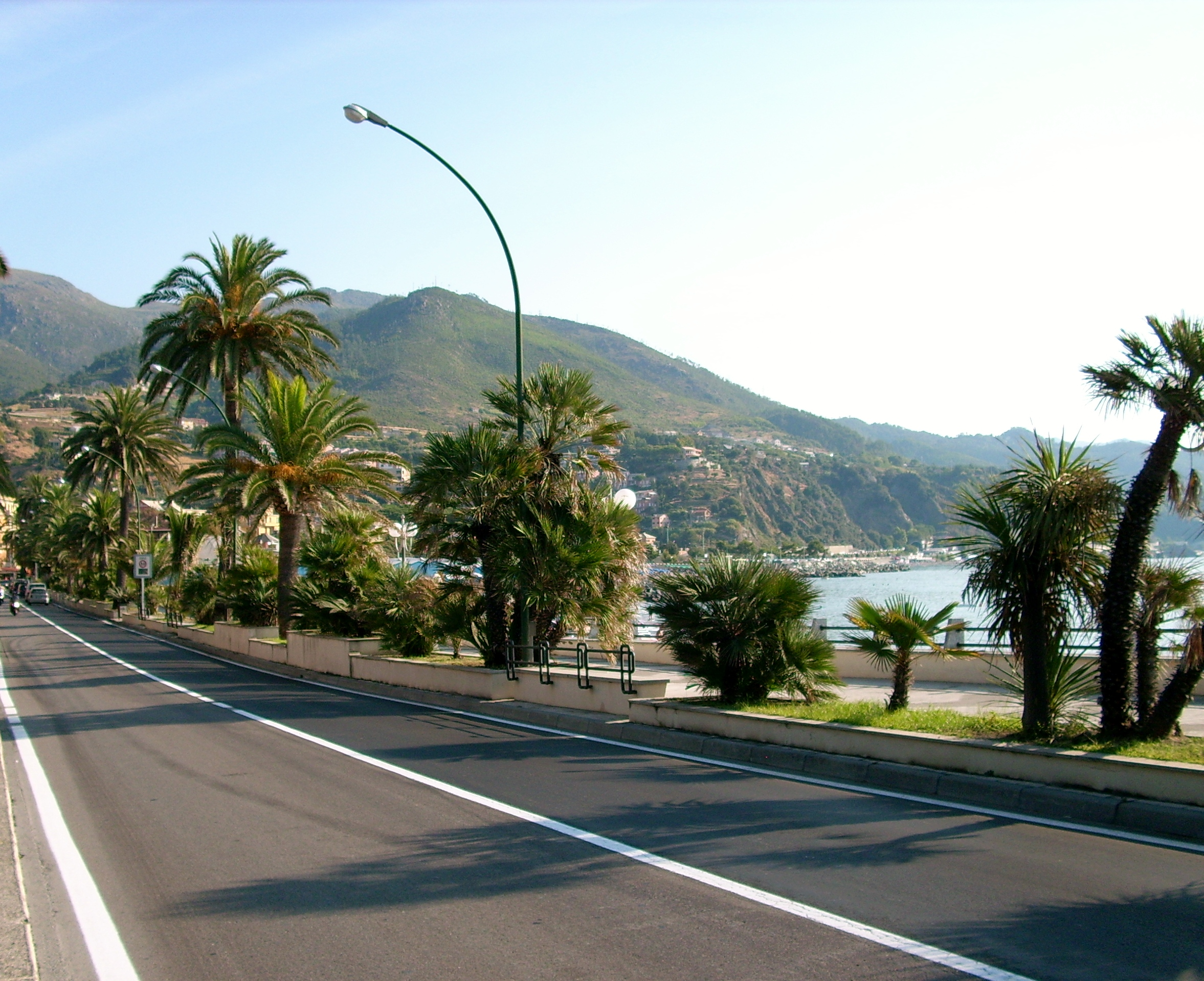
Strada statale 1 Via Aurelia in Arenzano

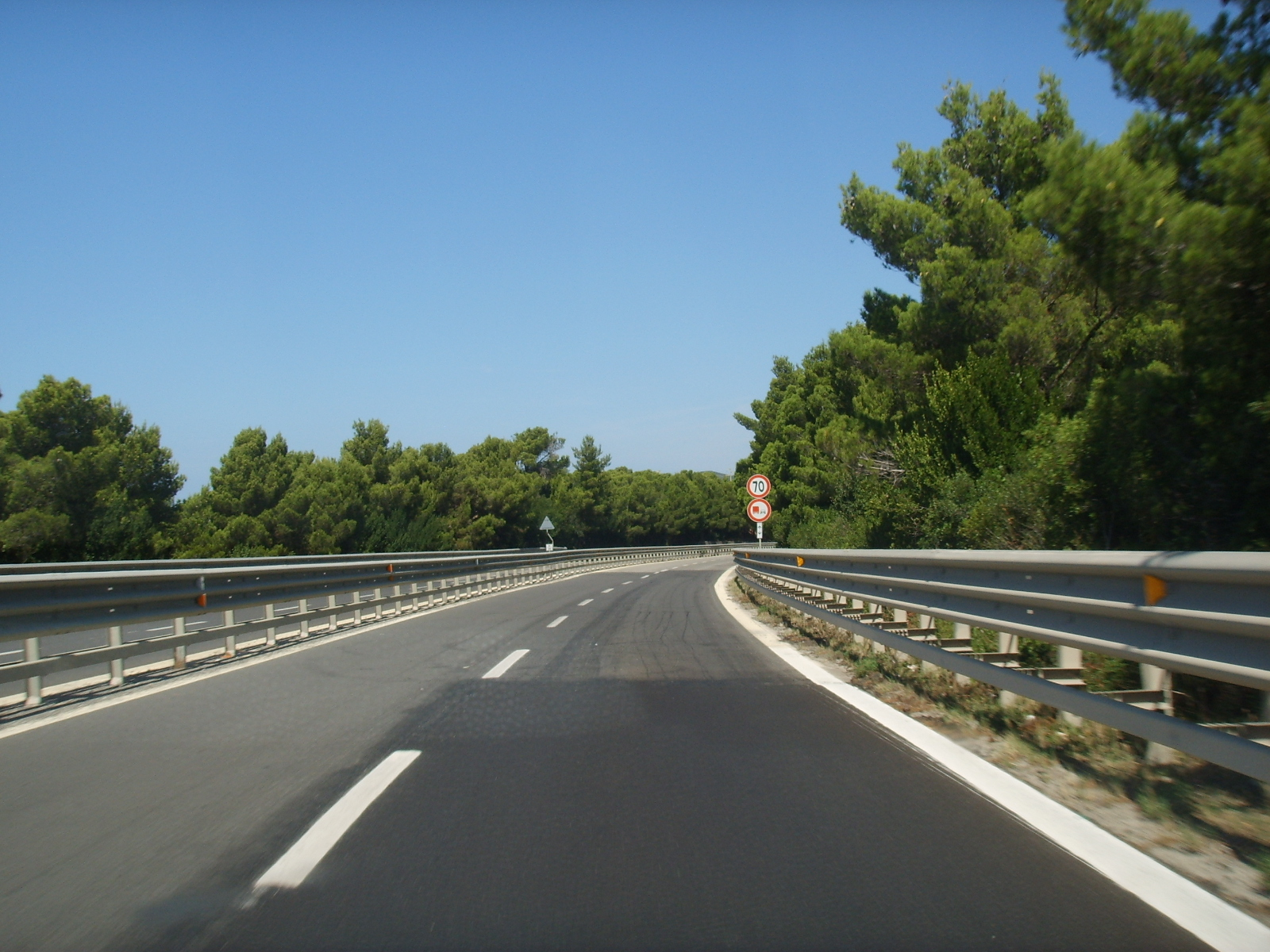
Strada statale 1 Via Aurelia in Livorno

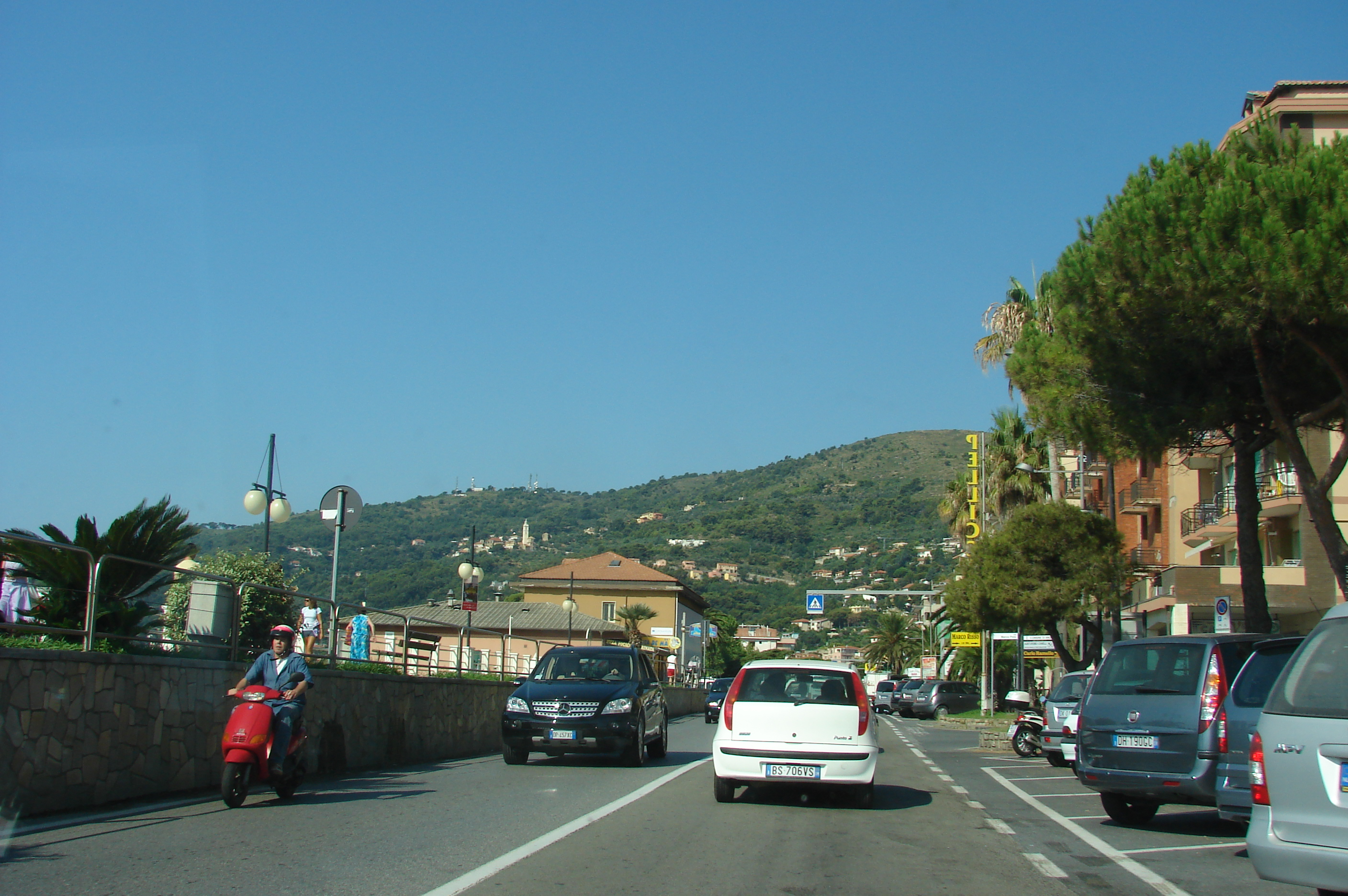
Strada statale 1 Via Aurelia in Andora

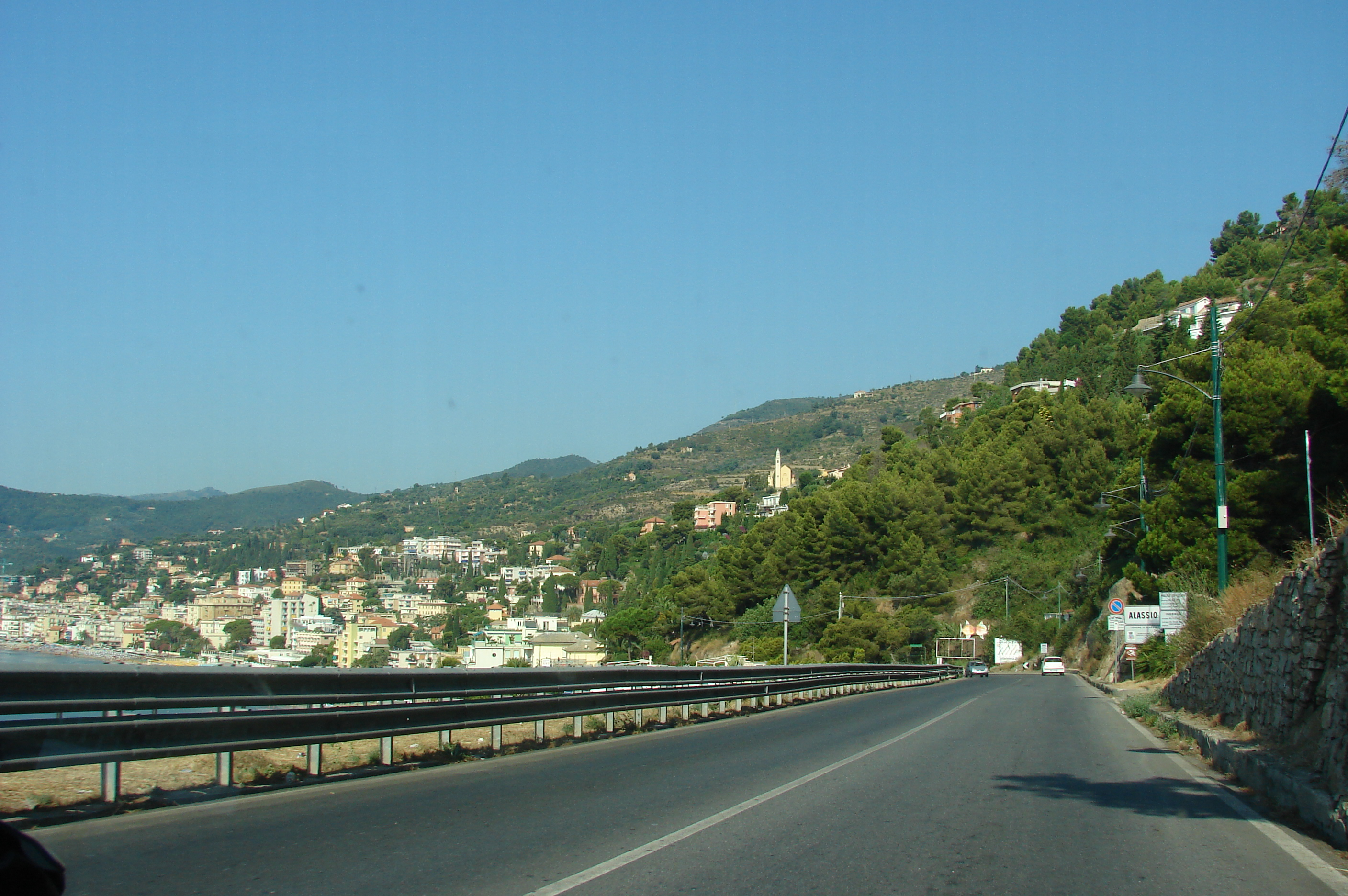
Strada statale 1 Via Aurelia in Alassio

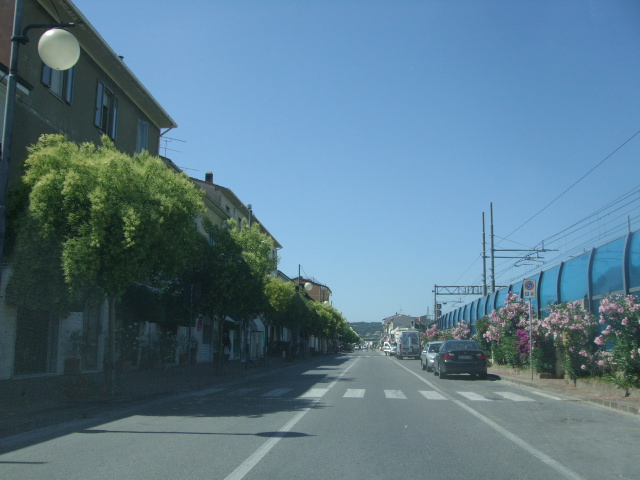
Strada statale 1 Via Aurelia in Rosignano Marittimo

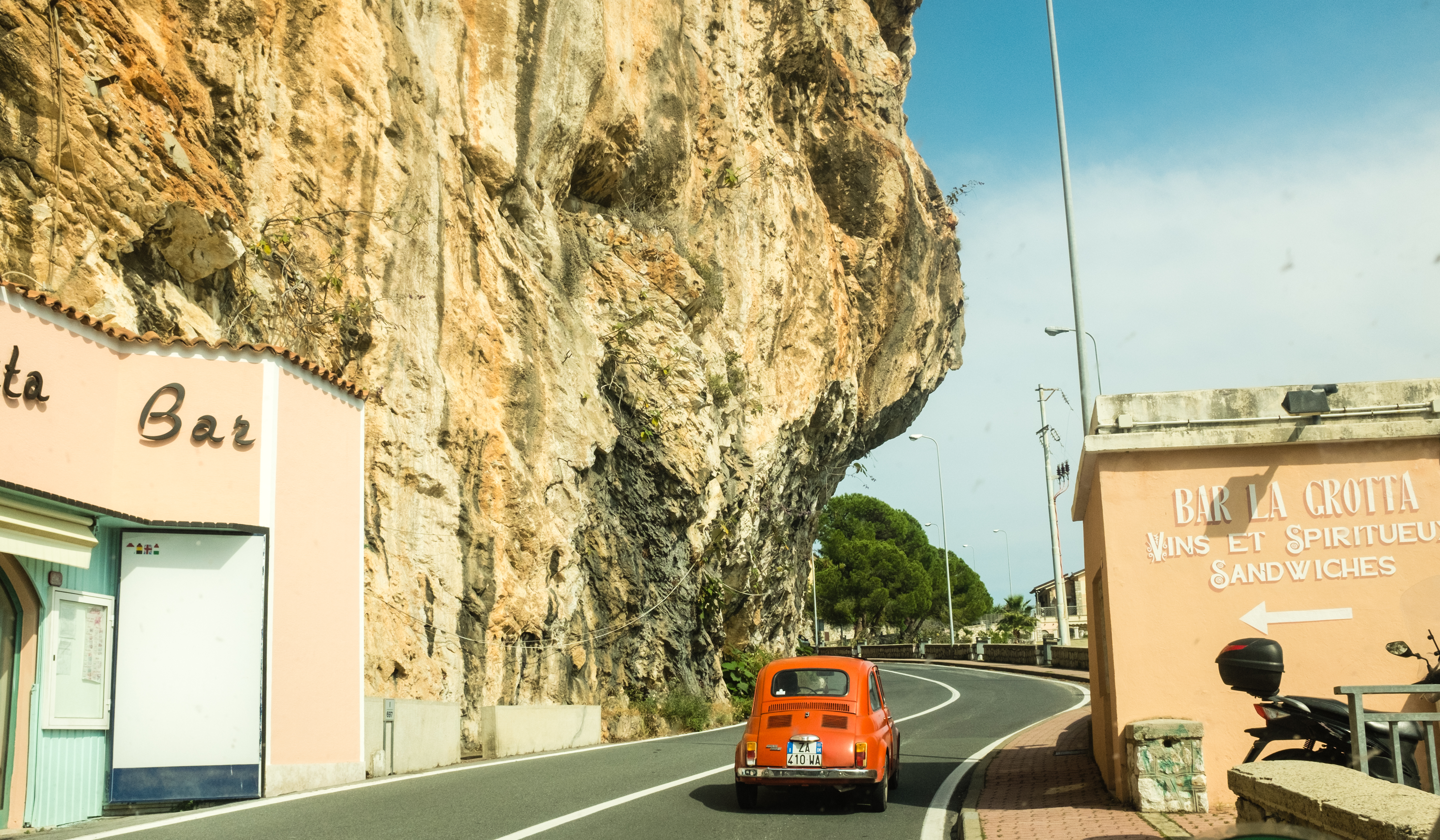
Strada statale 1 Via Aurelia in Ventimiglia

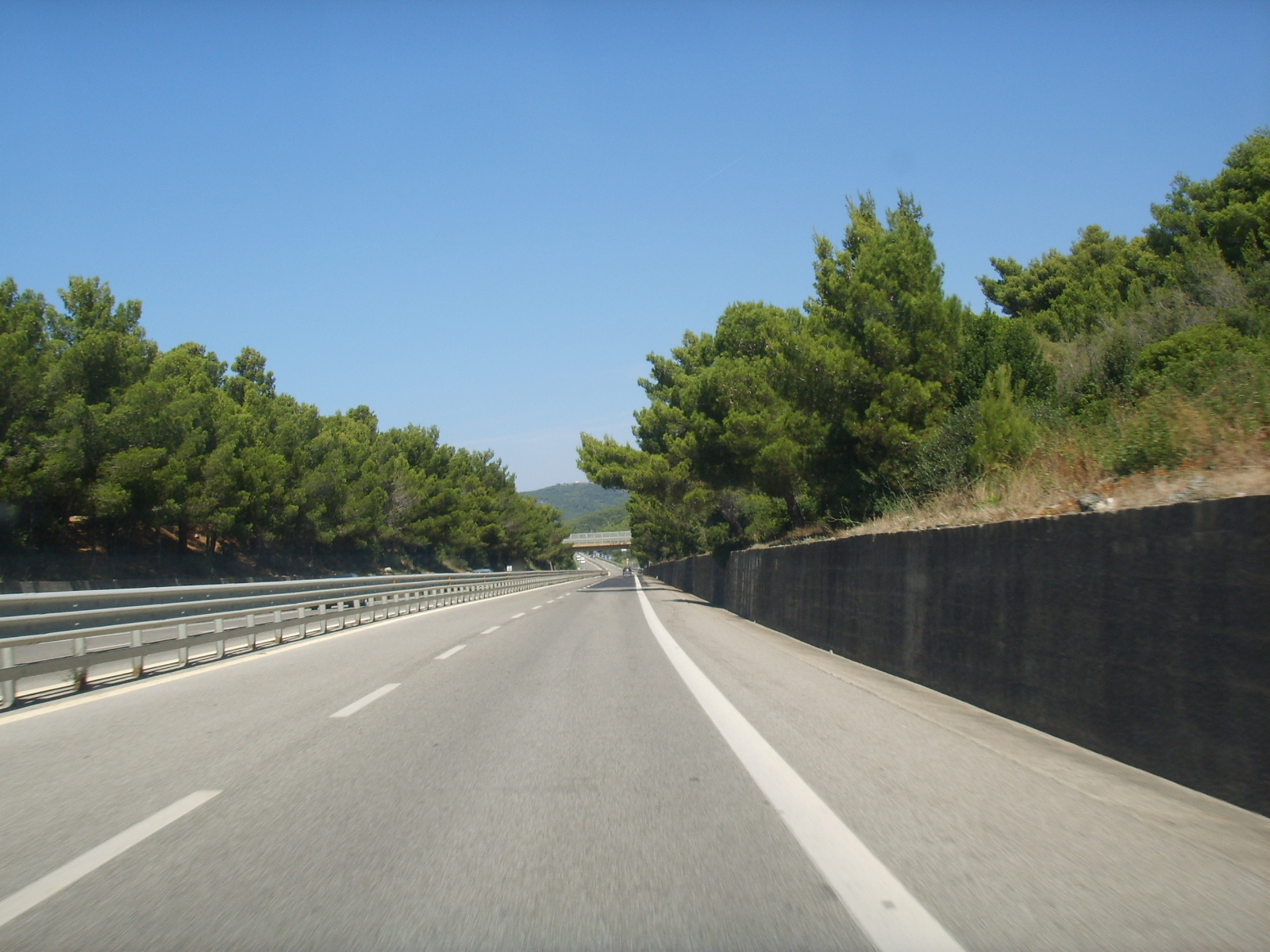
Strada statale 1 Via Aurelia in Livorno

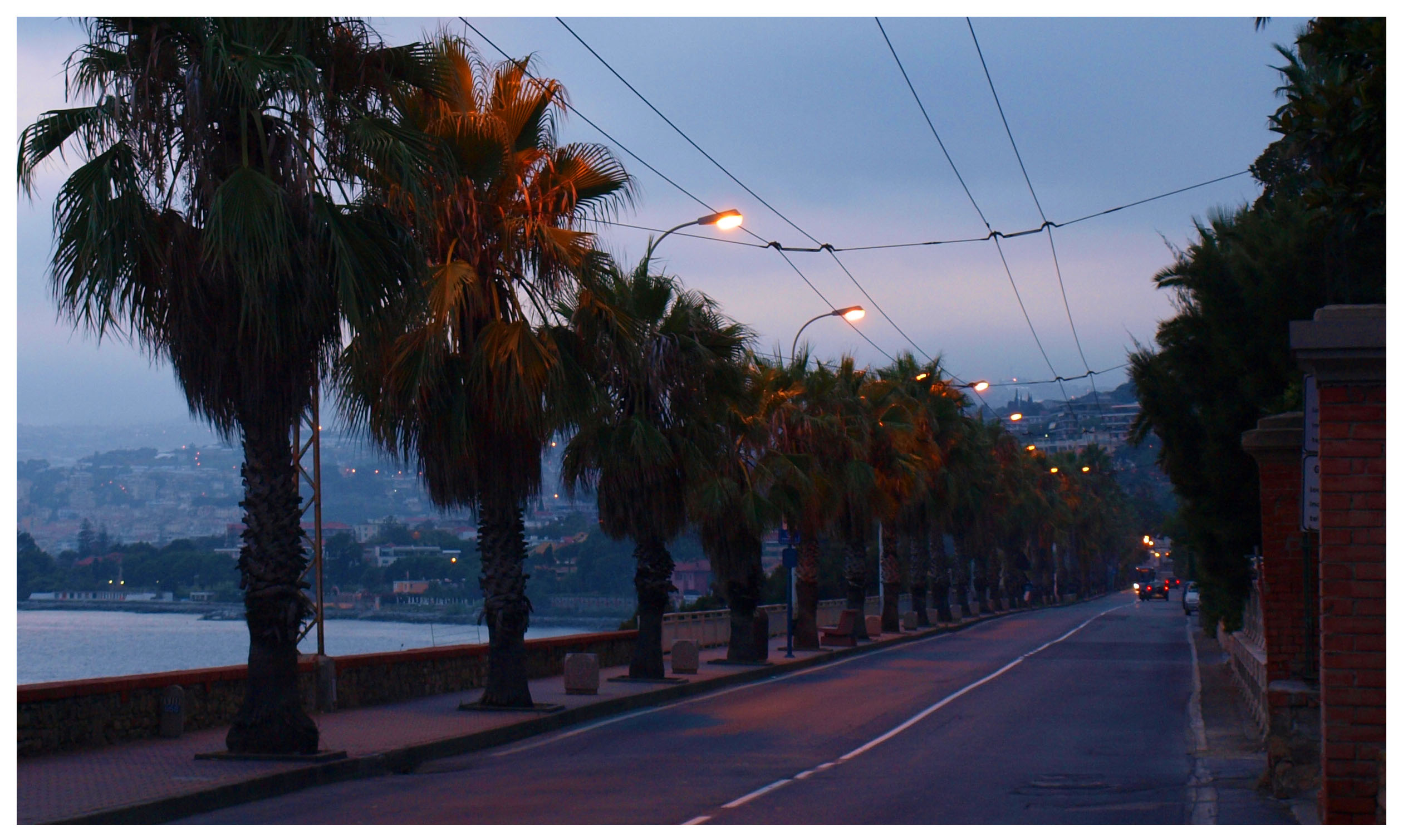
Strada statale 1 Via Aurelia in Sanremo

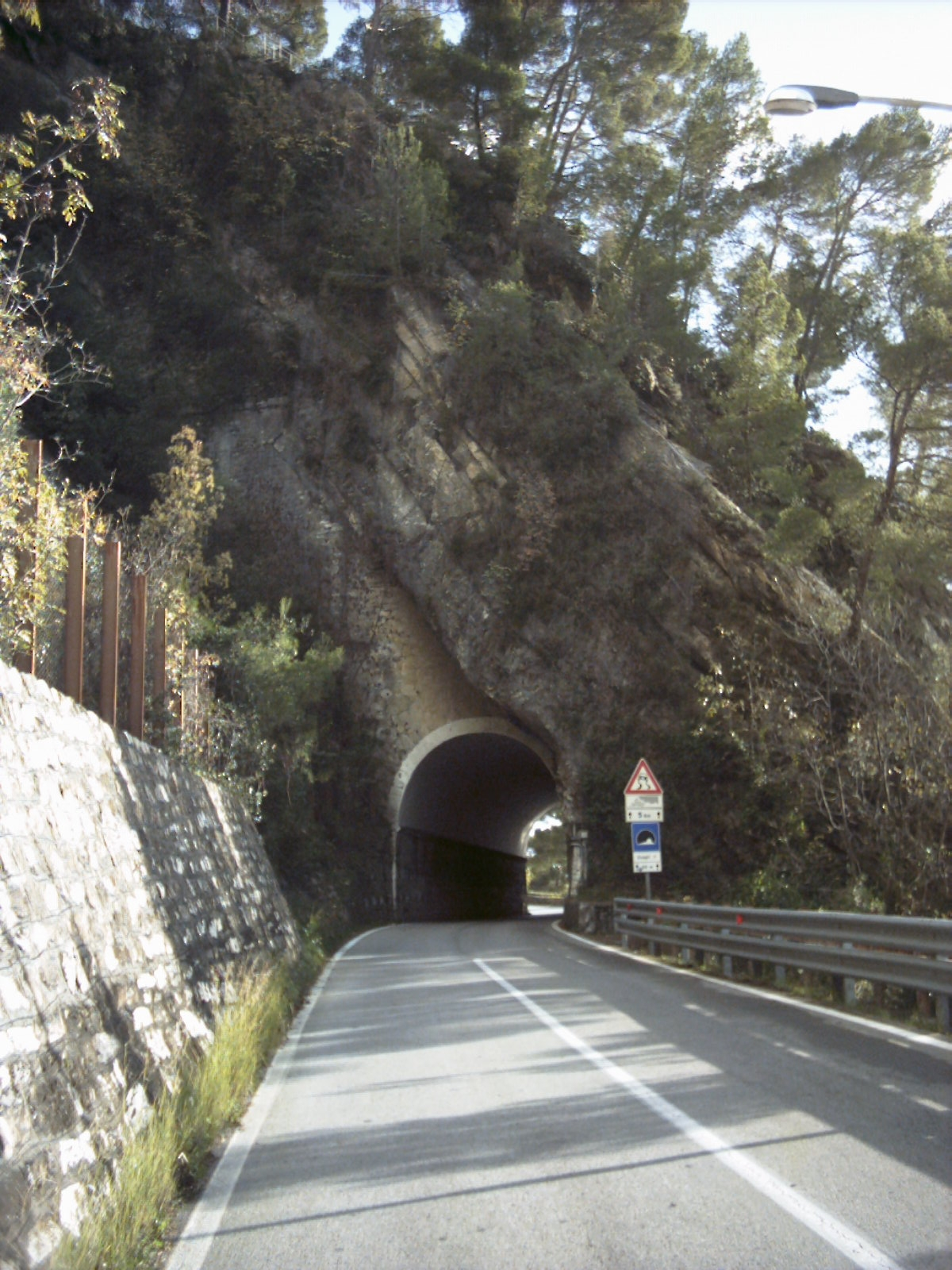
Strada statale 1 Via Aurelia in Zoagli

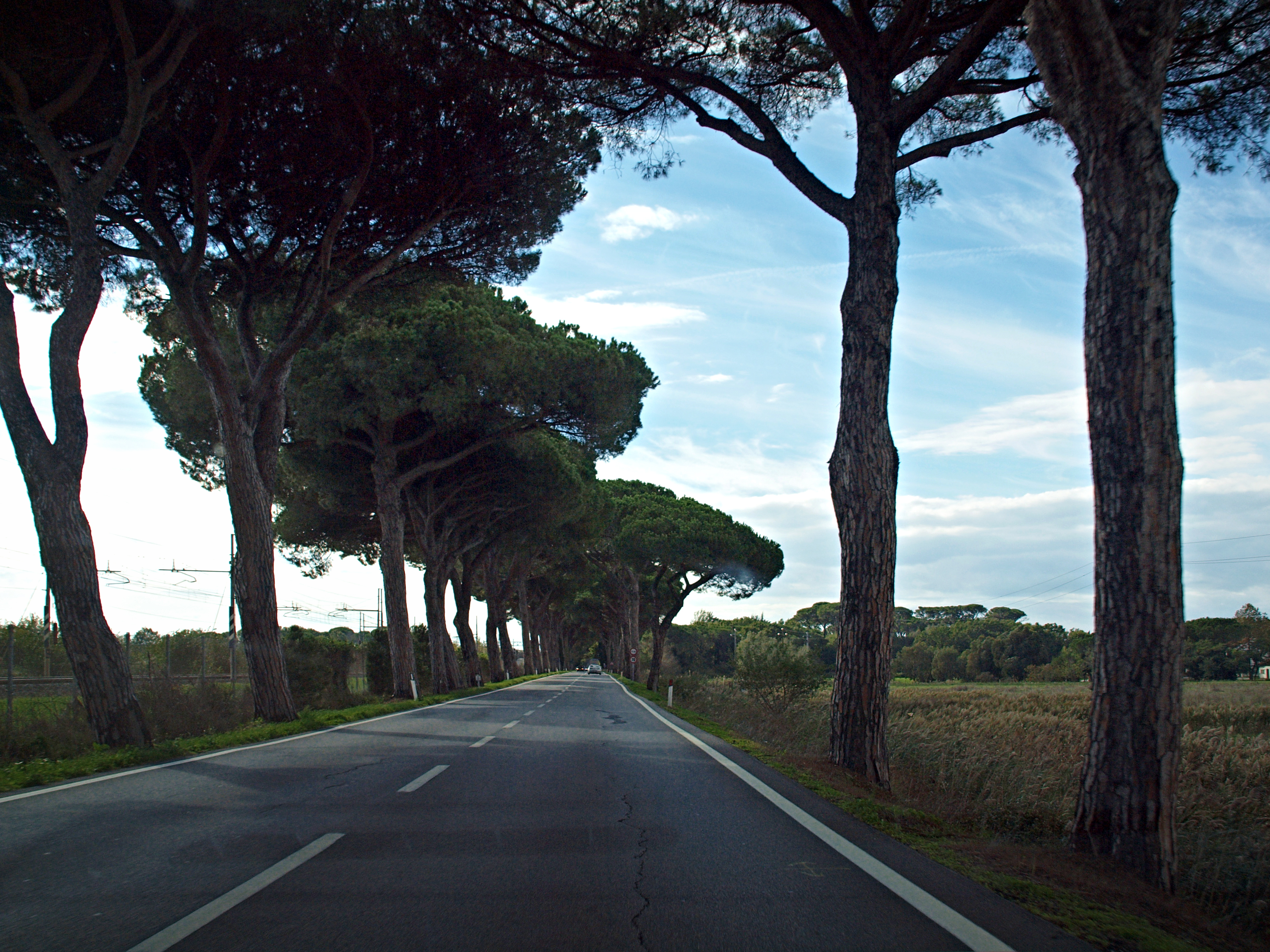
Strada statale 1 Via Aurelia in Pisa

=== From Rome to Grosseto ===
Via Aurelia; Rome - Grosseto section
Exit	↓km↓	Province	European Route
Rome	0.0 km (0 mi)	RM	E80
Start of section with separate carriageways	0.0 km (0 mi)	RM	E80
Grande Raccordo Anulare	9.4 km (5.8 mi)	RM	E80
Malagrotta	14.6 km (9.1 mi)	RM	E80
Castel di Guido	20.4 km (12.7 mi)	RM	E80
Aranova	23.2 km (14.4 mi)	RM	E80
Torrimpietra	26.4 km (16.4 mi)	RM	E80
End of section with separate carriageways	27.7 km (17.2 mi)	RM	E80
Torrimpietra	27.7 km (17.2 mi)	RM	E80
Ladispoli	37.1 km (23.1 mi)	RM	E80
Ladispoli nord	40.6 km (25.2 mi)	RM	E80
Cerveteri-Ladispoli	41.4 km (25.7 mi)	RM	E80
Aeroporto militare di Furbara	48.9 km (30.4 mi)	RM	E80
Santa Severa	53.2 km (33.1 mi)	RM	E80
Santa Marinella	54.2 km (33.7 mi)	RM	E80
Santa Marinella	61.0 km (37.9 mi)	RM	E80
Civitavecchia Sud	66.8 km (41.5 mi)	RM	E80
Civitavecchia	71.0 km (44.1 mi)	RM	E80
Porto di Civitavecchia	72.5 km (45.0 mi)	RM	E80
Genova - Roma	80.2 km (49.8 mi)	RM	E80
Tarquinia	95.5 km (59.3 mi)	VT	--
Montalto di Castro ì Castrense	109.5 km (68.0 mi)	VT	--
Centrale Enel	113.7 km (70.6 mi)	VT	--
Pescia Romana	120.4 km (74.8 mi)	VT	--
Chiarone	124.1 km (77.1 mi)	GR	--
End of section with separate carriageways	124.1 km (77.1 mi)	GR	--
Capalbio	128.3 km (79.7 mi)	GR	--
Ansedonia	137.5 km (85.4 mi)	GR	--
Start of section with separate carriageways	137.9 km (85.7 mi)	GR	--

=== From Grosseto to Livorno ===
Variante Aurelia; Grosseto - Livorno section
Exit	↓km↓	Province	European Route
Grosseto sud	177.7 km (110.4 mi)	GR	
Grosseto est	182.6 km (113.5 mi)	GR	
Grosseto centro - Roselle; Siena	185.8 km (115.5 mi)	GR	
Grosseto nord	188.0 km (116.8 mi)	GR	
Montepescali (solo uscita dir. LI)	196.9 km (122.3 mi)	GR	
Braccagni; Senese Aretina	198.5 km (123.3 mi)	GR	
Giuncarico	202.8 km (126.0 mi)	GR	
Gavorrano Scalo	213.4 km (132.6 mi)	GR	
Gavorrano	217.3 km (135.0 mi)	GR	
Scarlino	222.4 km (138.2 mi)	GR	
Follonica est - Massa Marittima; Sarzanese Valdera	225.4 km (140.1 mi)	GR	
Follonica nord	232.6 km (144.5 mi)	GR/LI	
Vignale Riotorto; Piombino	236.8 km (147.1 mi)	LI	
Piombino - Venturina	244.0 km (151.6 mi)	LI	
San Vincenzo sud Campiglia Marittima	252.9 km (157.1 mi)	LI	
San Vincenzo nord	256.6 km (159.4 mi)	LI	
Donoratico	264.0 km (164.0 mi)	LI	
Cecina sud - La California	275.6 km (171.2 mi)	LI	
Cecina centro	280.3 km (174.2 mi)	LI	
Cecina nord-Zona industriale	282.1 km (175.3 mi)	LI	
Genova - Rosignano	283.5 km (176.2 mi)	LI	
Rosignano Marittimo	290.9 km (180.8 mi)	LI	
Rosignano Solvay	293.3 km (182.2 mi)	LI	
Castiglioncello	296.1 km (184.0 mi)	LI	
End of section with separate carriageways	300.5 km (186.7 mi)	LI	
Quercianella	301.8 km (187.5 mi)	LI	
Livorno Antignano	307.0 km (190.8 mi)	LI	
Start of section with separate carriageways	307.8 km (191.3 mi)	LI	
Livorno Montenero	311.0 km (193.2 mi)	LI	
Livorno sud - Salviano	313.5 km (194.8 mi)	LI	
Livorno Porta a terra Centro Commerciale	315.4 km (196.0 mi)	LI	
Livorno centro	316.9 km (196.9 mi)	LI	
Collesalvetti	318.0 km (197.6 mi)	LI	
Stagno sud	318.7 km (198.0 mi)	LI	
Strada di grande comunicazione Firenze-Pisa-Livorno	319.5 km (198.5 mi)	LI	
Autostrada A12	320.0 km (198.8 mi) 173.6 km (107.9 mi)	LI	
Stagno Nord	171.8 km (106.8 mi)	PI	
Genova - Rosignano Casello di Livorno	171.5 km (106.6 mi)	PI	

=== From Livorno to the border with Liguria ===
Via Aurelia; Rosignano Marittimo-Vezzano Ligure section
Exit	↓km↓	Province	European Route
Rosignano Marittimo	287.2 km (178.5 mi)	LI	--
Rosignano Marittimo	290.8 km (180.7 mi)	LI	--
Rosignano Solvay	293.0 km (182.1 mi)	LI	--
Castiglioncello	296.1 km (184.0 mi)	LI	--
Campo Lecciano	299.5 km (186.1 mi)	LI	--
Chioma	300.8 km (186.9 mi)	LI	--
End of section with separate carriageways	300.8 km (186.9 mi)	LI	--
Quercianella	302.5 km (188.0 mi)	LI	--
Via Aurelia Vecchia	307.2 km (190.9 mi)	LI	--
Start of section with separate carriageways	307.7 km (191.2 mi)	LI	--
Montenero	311.1 km (193.3 mi)	LI	--
Livorno Sud	313.2 km (194.6 mi)	LI	--
Livorno	315.2 km (195.9 mi)	LI	--
Livorno centro	316.9 km (196.9 mi)	LI	--
Strada di grande comunicazione Firenze-Pisa-Livorno	321.0 km (199.5 mi)	LI	--
Autostrada Azzurra	322.6 km (200.5 mi)	LI	--
End of section with separate carriageways	322.6 km (200.5 mi)	LI	--
Aeroporto di Pisa	333.1 km (207.0 mi)	PI	--
Strada di grande comunicazione Firenze-Pisa-Livorno	333.5 km (207.2 mi)	PI	--
Pisa	334.0 km (207.5 mi)	PI	--
Migliarino	342.1 km (212.6 mi)	PI	--
Firenze - Pisa Nord	343.4 km (213.4 mi)	PI	--
Torre del Lago Puccini Sud	349.9 km (217.4 mi)	LU	--
Start of section with separate carriageways	350.3 km (217.7 mi)	LU	--
Marina di Torre del Lago - Torre Del Lago Nord	351.7 km (218.5 mi)	LU	--
Cotone - Viareggio Sud	354.5 km (220.3 mi)	LU	--
Viareggio Centro	356.1 km (221.3 mi)	LU	--
Viareggio	357.9 km (222.4 mi)	LU	--
End of section with separate carriageways	359.6 km (223.4 mi)	LU	--
Lido di Camaiore - Viareggio Nord	359.8 km (223.6 mi)	LU	--
Pietrasanta	366.0 km (227.4 mi)	LU	--
Querceta	369.4 km (229.5 mi)	LU	--
Massa	376.5 km (233.9 mi)	MS	--
Carrara	383.8 km (238.5 mi)	MS	--
Luni	388.9 km (241.7 mi)	SP	--
Sarzana	394.5 km (245.1 mi)	SP	--
della Cisa	397.0 km (246.7 mi)	SP	--
Sarzana	397.6 km (247.1 mi)	SP	--
Vezzano Ligure	405.6 km (252.0 mi)	SP	--

== See also ==
- State highways (Italy)
- Roads in Italy
- Transport in Italy

=== Other Italian roads ===
- Autostrade of Italy
- Regional road (Italy)
- Provincial road (Italy)
- Municipal road (Italy)
