= Autostrada A11 (Italy) =

Controlled-access highway in Italy

Autostrada A11
- Autostrada Firenze-Mare; Florence-Sea Motorway

Route information
- Part of E76
- Maintained by ANAS
- Length: 81.7 km (50.8 mi)
- Existed: 1933–present

Major junctions
- East end: Florence
- A1 in Florence; A12 in Lucca; A12 in Pisa
- West end: Pisa

Location
- Country: Italy
- Regions: Tuscany

Highway system
- Roads in Italy; Autostrade; State; Regional; Provincial; Municipal
← A 10	→ A 12

The Autostrada A11 or Autostrada Firenze - Mare ("Florence-Sea Motorway") is an autostrada (Italian for "motorway") 81.7 kilometres (50.8 mi) long in Italy located in the region of Tuscany, which connects Florence to Pisa. It is a part of the E76 European route. The Autostrada A11 it is currently operated by Autostrade per l'Italia. It is the busiest road in Tuscany and connects Florence to the central-northern Tyrrhenian coast, crossing the Arno river plain, the densely populated and industrialized plain of Prato and Pistoia, the Valdinievole and the plain of Lucca. An 18.2 kilometres (11.3 mi) connection, built in the 1970s, connects Lucca to Viareggio, facilitating the connection with the Autostrada A12 towards Genoa.

== Route ==
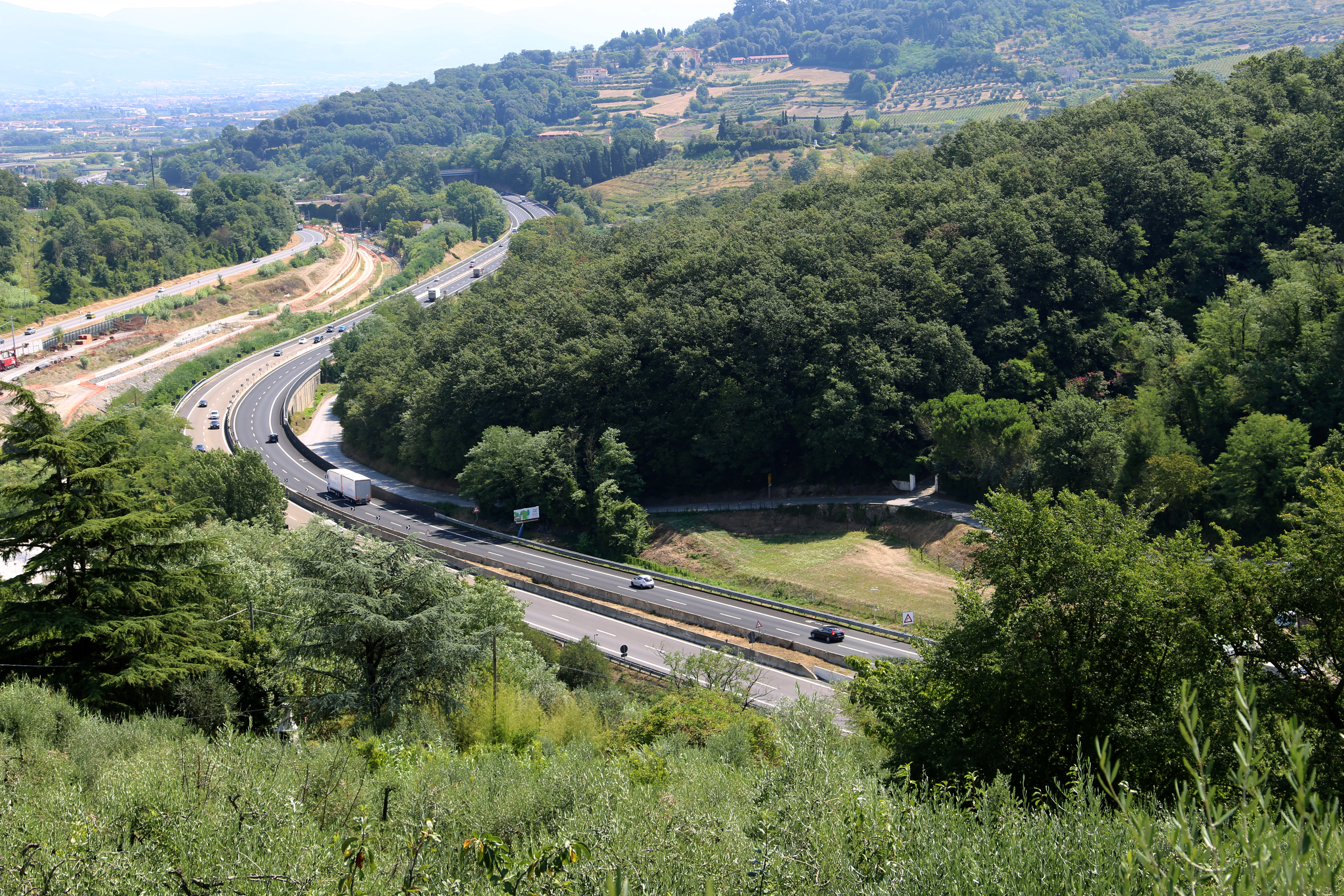
Autostrada A11 near Serravalle Pistoiese

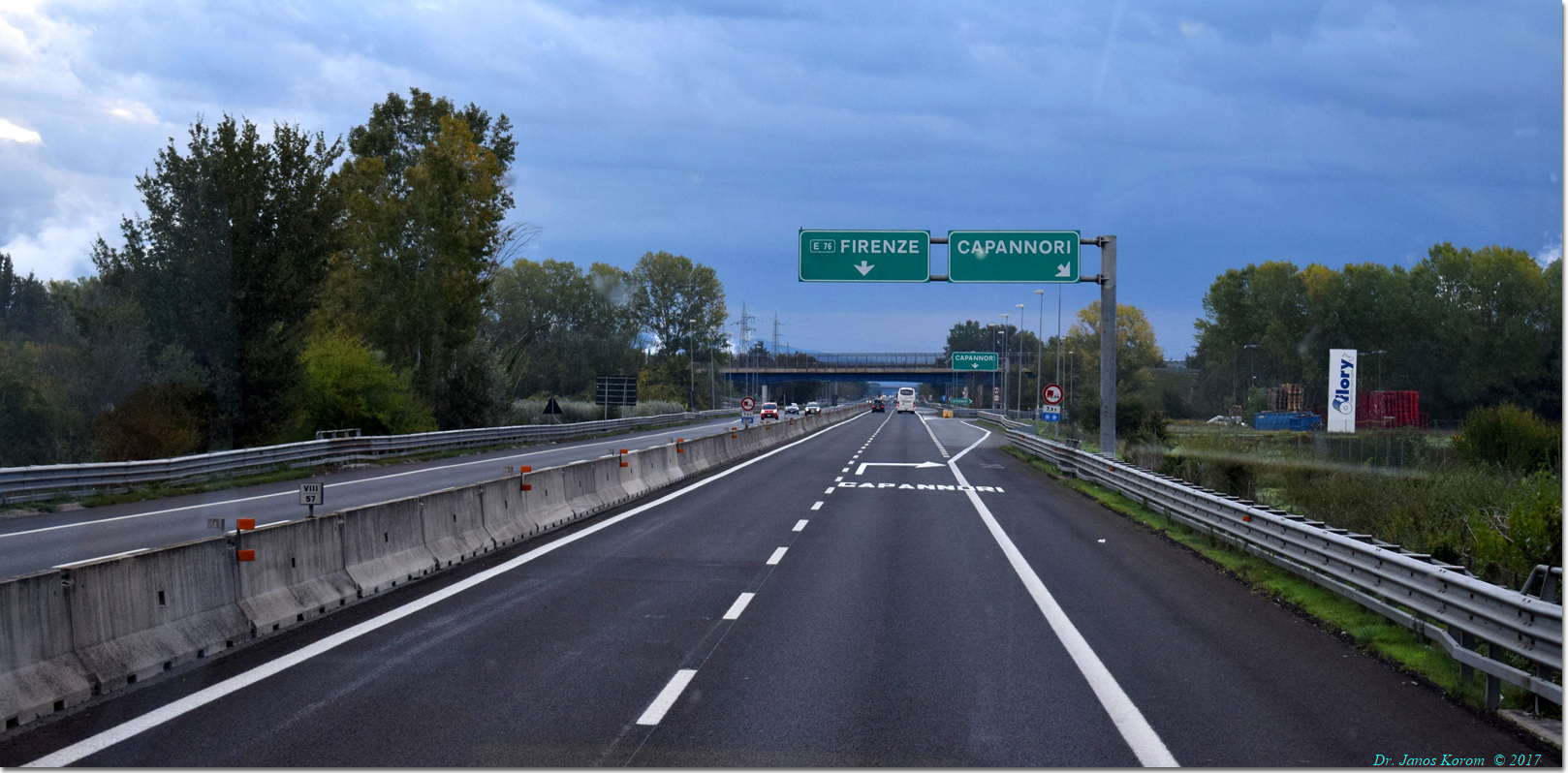
Autostrada A11 near Capannori

FIRENZE – PISA; Autostrada Firenze - Mare
Exit	↓km↓	↑km↑	Province	European route
Firenze Ovest - Peretola; Florence Peretola Airport	0.0 km (0 mi)	81.7 km (50.8 mi)	FI	E76
Sesto Fiorentino	2.0 km (1.2 mi)	79.2 km (49.2 mi)	FI	E76
Rest area "Peretola"	3.0 km (1.9 mi)	78.2 km (48.6 mi)	FI	E76
Toll gate Firenze Ovest	4.2 km (2.6 mi)	77.0 km (47.8 mi)	FI	E76
Rest area "Firenze Nord" (Note: Only for traffic in the direction of the A1)	4.6 km (2.9 mi)	76.6 km (47.6 mi)	FI	E76
Bologna - Roma (Note: Coming from Florence, access to the A1 is earlier and takes place through the "Firenze Nord" toll booth.)	4.9 km (3.0 mi)	76.3 km (47.4 mi)	FI	E76
Prato Est	9.0 km (5.6 mi)	72.2 km (44.9 mi)	PO	E76
Prato Ovest	16.8 km (10.4 mi)	64.4 km (40.0 mi)	PO	E76
Pistoia	27.4 km (17.0 mi)	53.8 km (33.4 mi)	PT	E76
Rest area "Serravalle"	35.5 km (22.1 mi)	45.7 km (28.4 mi)	PT	E76
Montecatini Terme	39.0 km (24.2 mi)	42.2 km (26.2 mi)	PT	E76
Chiesina Uzzanese	46.4 km (28.8 mi)	34.8 km (21.6 mi)	PT	E76
Altopascio	49.3 km (30.6 mi)	31.9 km (19.8 mi)	LU	E76
Capannori	57.2 km (35.5 mi)	24.0 km (14.9 mi)	LU	E76
Lucca Est	63.5 km (39.5 mi)	17.7 km (11.0 mi)	LU	E76
Lucca Ovest; Lucca-Viareggio; Genova	66.0 km (41.0 mi)	15.2 km (9.4 mi)	LU	E76
Rest area "Migliarino"	79.1 km (49.2 mi)	2.1 km (1.3 mi)	PI	E76
Genova - Cecina; Pisa; Pisa International Airport	80.7 km (50.1 mi)	0.5 km (0.31 mi)	PI	E76
Toll gate Pisa Nord	81.0 km (50.3 mi)	0.2 km (0.12 mi)	PI	E76
Pisa Nord; Via Aurelia	81.7 km (50.8 mi)	0.0 km (0 mi)	PI	E76

=== A11/A12 Lucca-Viareggio connection ===
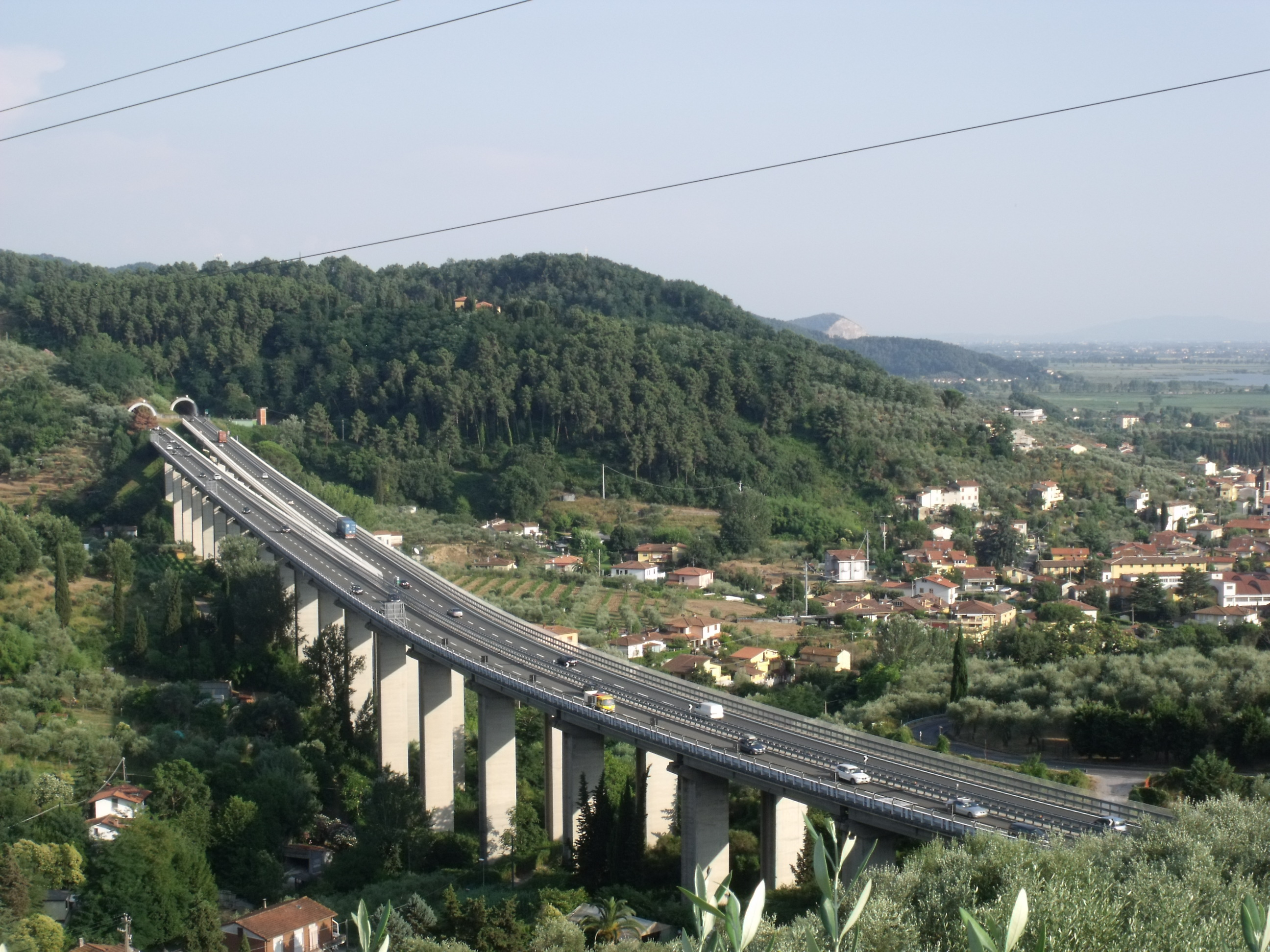
A11/A12 Lucca-Viareggio connection near Massarosa

AUTOSTRADA A11/A12; Lucca - Viareggio connection
Exit	↓km↓	↑km↑	Province	European route
Florence–Pisa	0.0 km (0 mi)	18.2 km (11.3 mi)	LU	--
Lucca Ovest	0.7 km (0.43 mi)	17.5 km (10.9 mi)	LU	--
Rest area "Monte Quiesa" (Note: Only for traffic in the direction of the A12)	9.7 km (6.0 mi)	8.5 km (5.3 mi)	LU	--
Massarosa	12.0 km (7.5 mi)	6.2 km (3.9 mi)	LU	--
Genoa–Rome	18.0 km (11.2 mi)	0.2 km (0.12 mi)	LU	--
Viareggio	18.2 km (11.3 mi)	0.0 km (0 mi)	LU	--

== See also ==
- Autostrade of Italy
- Roads in Italy
- Transport in Italy

=== Other Italian roads ===
- State highways (Italy)
- Regional road (Italy)
- Provincial road (Italy)
- Municipal road (Italy)
