= European route E76 =

Road in trans-European E-road network

E76

Route information
- Length: 88 km (55 mi)

Major junctions
- West end: Pisa
- East end: Florence

Location
- Countries: Italy

Highway system
- International E-road network; A Class; B Class

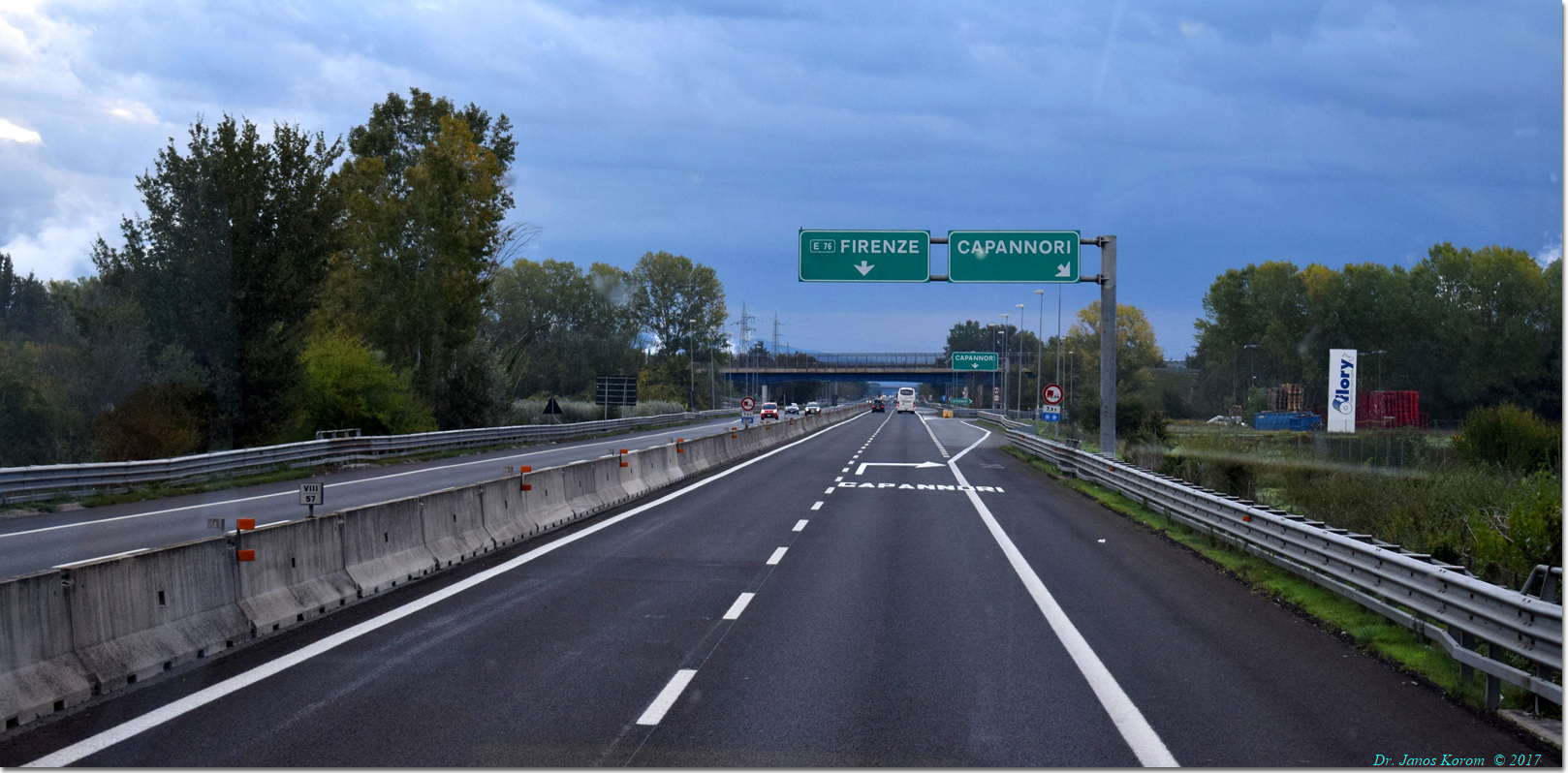
European route 76 near Capannori.

European route E76 forms part of the United Nations International E-road network. Its course lies entirely within Italy, where it connects Migliarino Pisano, near Pisa, to Florence, by way of Lucca, Pistoia, and Prato.

== Earlier E-road numbering ==
Prior to the revision of E-road numbering in 1992, the number E76 referred to a road in Norway, now numbered E134.

== Route ==
Italy

- A 11: Pisa - Lucca - Capannori - Pistoia - Prato - Sesto Fiorentino - Florence
