= Autostrada A15 (Italy) =

Controlled-access highway in Italy

Autostrada A15
- Autostrada della Cisa; Cisa motorway

Route information
- Part of E33
- Maintained by Società Autostrada Ligure Toscana
- Length: 108.5 km (67.4 mi)
- Existed: 1975–present

Major junctions
- North end: Parma
- A1 in Parma; A12 in Aulla
- South end: La Spezia

Location
- Country: Italy
- Regions: Emilia-Romagna, Tuscany, Liguria

Highway system
- Roads in Italy; Autostrade; State; Regional; Provincial; Municipal
← A 14	→ A 16

The Autostrada A15 or Autostrada della Cisa ("Cisa motorway") is an autostrada (Italian for "motorway") 108.5 kilometres (67.4 mi) long in Italy located in the regions of Emilia-Romagna, Tuscany and Liguria connecting Parma and La Spezia through the valleys of the Taro and Magra rivers. It is a part of the E33 European route.

The road is also known as Autostrada della Cisa because it crosses the Northern Apennines at the Cisa Pass. The main 101-km expanse of the motorway connects the Autostrada A1 with the Autostrada A12, thus directly linking the Po Valley with the Italian Riviera and the Versilia region. The Autostrada A15 is operated by the company Società Autostrada Ligure Toscana.

At the 9-km mark, drivers are welcomed by a curious monument, a tuft of steel and cement sculpted by Luigi Magnani and placed in the traffic island between the two carriageways. The monument is visible to motorists coming from the A1.

== History ==
The first phase of this motorway, dating to the 1950s, was designed to provide an alternative route between the Po Valley and the coastal Tyrrhenian Sea. The construction required several viaducts and tunnels to attain the maximum altitude of 745 metres above sea level at the entrance of the tunnel crossing. Built as a dual carriageway (divided highway), it is very curvilinear and challenging to drive and, therefore, has long been used for testing new heavy duty vehicles.

Except for short stretches of the highway, the road surface is not porous or fitted with storm drains, making it difficult to negotiate during heavy rain.

== Route ==
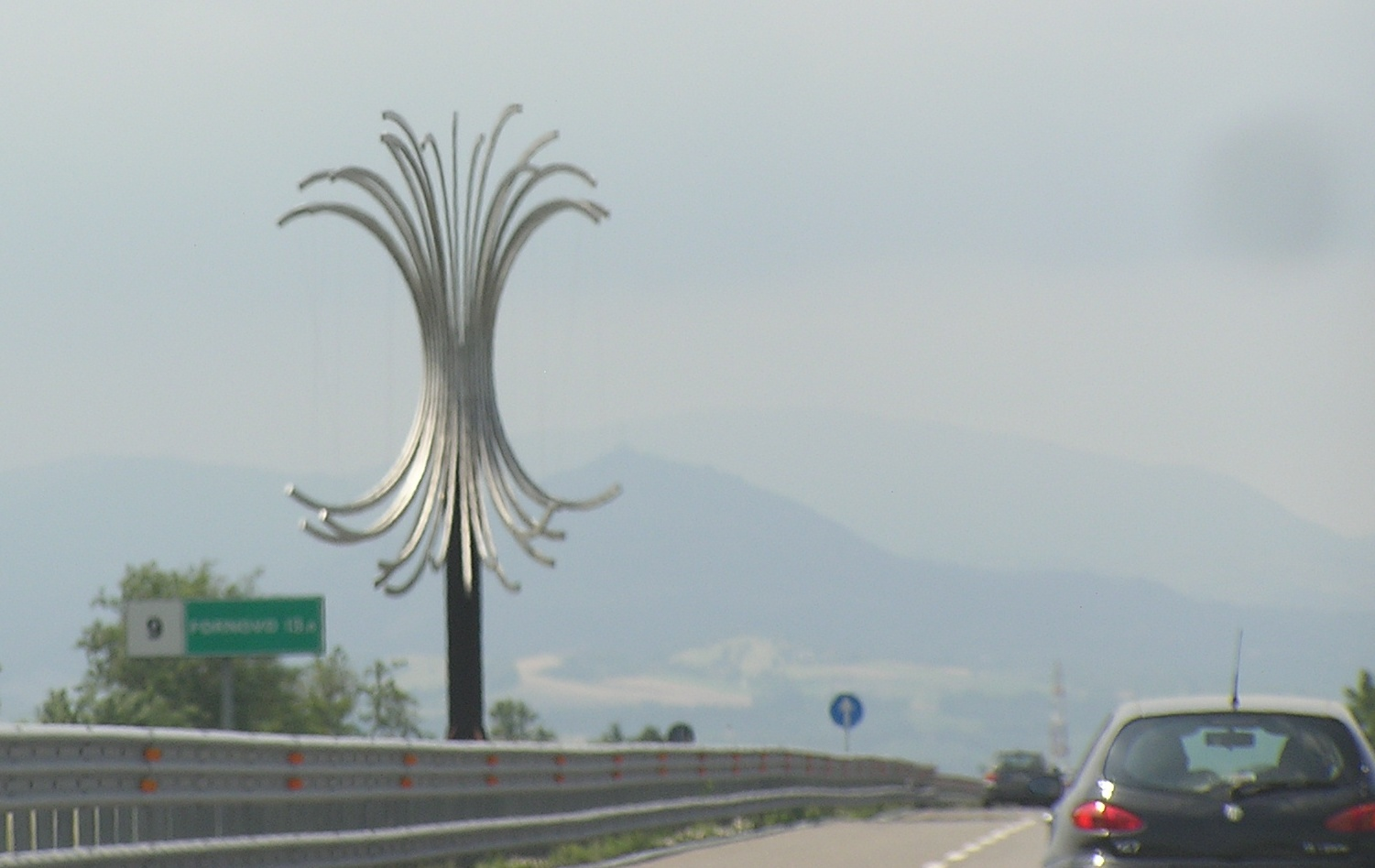
Autostrada A15 near Parma, with the steel monument in the shape of a "tuft" placed in the large traffic island between the two carriageways.

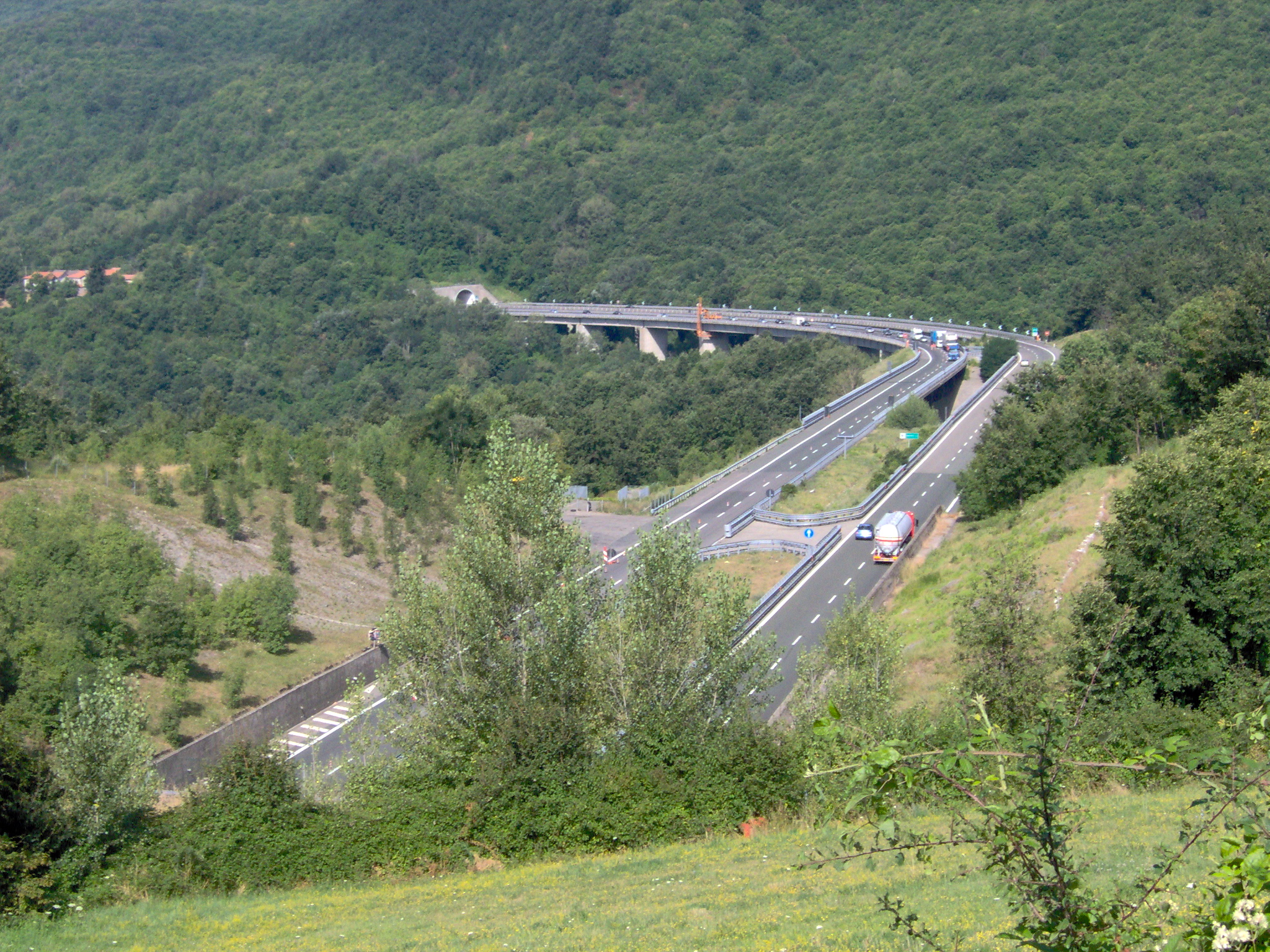
Autostrada A15 near Berceto

The motorway begins from the A1, near Parma. From the Parma Ovest (West Parma) exit the highway climbs through the Taro Valley with exits to Fornovo di Taro, Borgotaro and the village of Berceto, all within the Emilia-Romagna region. After traversing the tunnel, the highway continues into Tuscany, with exits to Pontremoli and Aulla. Shortly after entering Liguria it intersects the A12 at Santo Stefano di Magra, a few kilometres from La Spezia.

There are five service stations and rest areas along the way.

PARMA – LA SPEZIA; Autostrada della Cisa
Exit	↓km↓	↑km↑	Province	European route
Milano - Roma	0.0 km (0 mi)	108.5 km (67.4 mi)	PR	E33
Parma ovest	5.2 km (3.2 mi)	103.3 km (64.2 mi)	PR	E33
Rest area "Medesano"	14.7 km (9.1 mi)	93.8 km (58.3 mi)	PR	E33
Fornovo di Taro	22.7 km (14.1 mi)	85.8 km (53.3 mi)	PR	E33
Borgotaro	42.1 km (26.2 mi)	66.4 km (41.3 mi)	PR	E33
Berceto	51.0 km (31.7 mi)	57.5 km (35.7 mi)	PR	E33
Rest area "Tugo"	54.3 km (33.7 mi)	54.2 km (33.7 mi)	PR	E33
Rest area "Montaio" (Note: Only in the direction of La Spezia.)	65.3 km (40.6 mi)	--	MS	E33
Pontremoli	74.6 km (46.4 mi)	33.9 km (21.1 mi)	MS	E33
Rest area "San Benedetto"	79.8 km (49.6 mi)	28.7 km (17.8 mi)	MS	E33
Aulla	91.4 km (56.8 mi)	17.1 km (10.6 mi)	MS	E33
Genova - Rosignano M.	100.7 km (62.6 mi)	7.8 km (4.8 mi)	MS	E33
Toll gate La Spezia	101.7 km (63.2 mi)	6.8 km (4.2 mi)	SP	E33
Diramazione per Santo Stefano di Magra	101.9 km (63.3 mi)	6.6 km (4.1 mi)	SP	E33
Vezzano Ligure (Note: Exit only towards La Spezia, entry only towards Parma)	103.2 km (64.1 mi)	5.3 km (3.3 mi)	SP	E33
Rest area "Melara" (Note: Only in the direction of Parma)	--	2.0 km (1.2 mi)	SP	E33
Melara - Pianazze (Note: Exit only towards Parma.); Industrial area	--	1.9 km (1.2 mi)	SP	E33
La Spezia Porto; Port of La Spezia; Raccordo per Lerici	107.6 km (66.9 mi)	0.9 km (0.56 mi)	SP	E33
La Spezia Via Carducci; Town center Boarding cruises Ferries to Palmaria, Porto Venere, Cinque Terre, Italian Riviera and Versilia; Porto Venere; Cinque Terre National Park	108.5 km (67.4 mi)	0.0 km (0 mi)	SP	E33

=== Santo Stefano di Magra connection ===
DIRAMAZIONE PER SANTO STEFANO DI MAGRA; Santo Stefano di Magra connection
Exit	↓km↓	↑km↑	Province
Santo Stefano di Magra	0.0 km (0 mi)	1.2 km (0.75 mi)	SP
Industrial area	0.2 km (0.12 mi)	1.0 km (0.62 mi)	SP
Area Retroportuale; Port of La Spezia	0.5 km (0.31 mi)	0.7 km (0.43 mi)	SP
Parma - La Spezia	1.2 km (0.75 mi)	0.0 km (0 mi)	SP

=== Lerici connection ===
RACCORDO PER LERICI; Lerici connection
Exit	↓km↓	↑km↑	Province
Parma - La Spezia	0.0 km (0 mi)	3.7 km (2.3 mi)	SP
Porto Est; Port of La Spezia; Industrial area	0.6 km (0.37 mi)	3.1 km (1.9 mi)	SP
di Lerici; Romito Magra	3.7 km (2.3 mi)	0.0 km (0 mi)	SP

== Proposed construction ==
A plan to extend the motorway route to the north through Fontevivo, Martignana di Po and Nogarole Rocca, linking to the A22 (the Autobrennero) around Verona, has been proposed. Land has been secured both for straightening the present route through the construction of new viaducts and tunnels and for the proposed extension. The town of Villafranca in Lunigiana and neighbouring municipalities have petitioned for opening such a new toll motorway. Negotiations have begun with private motorway companies and the Ministry of Infrastructure and Transport.

== See also ==
- Autostrade of Italy
- Roads in Italy
- Transport in Italy

=== Other Italian roads ===
- State highways (Italy)
- Regional road (Italy)
- Provincial road (Italy)
- Municipal road (Italy)
