= European route E33 =

Road in trans-European E-road network

E33

Route information
- Length: 124 km (77 mi)

Major junctions
- North end: Parma
- South end: La Spezia

Location
- Countries: Italy

Highway system
- International E-road network; A Class; B Class

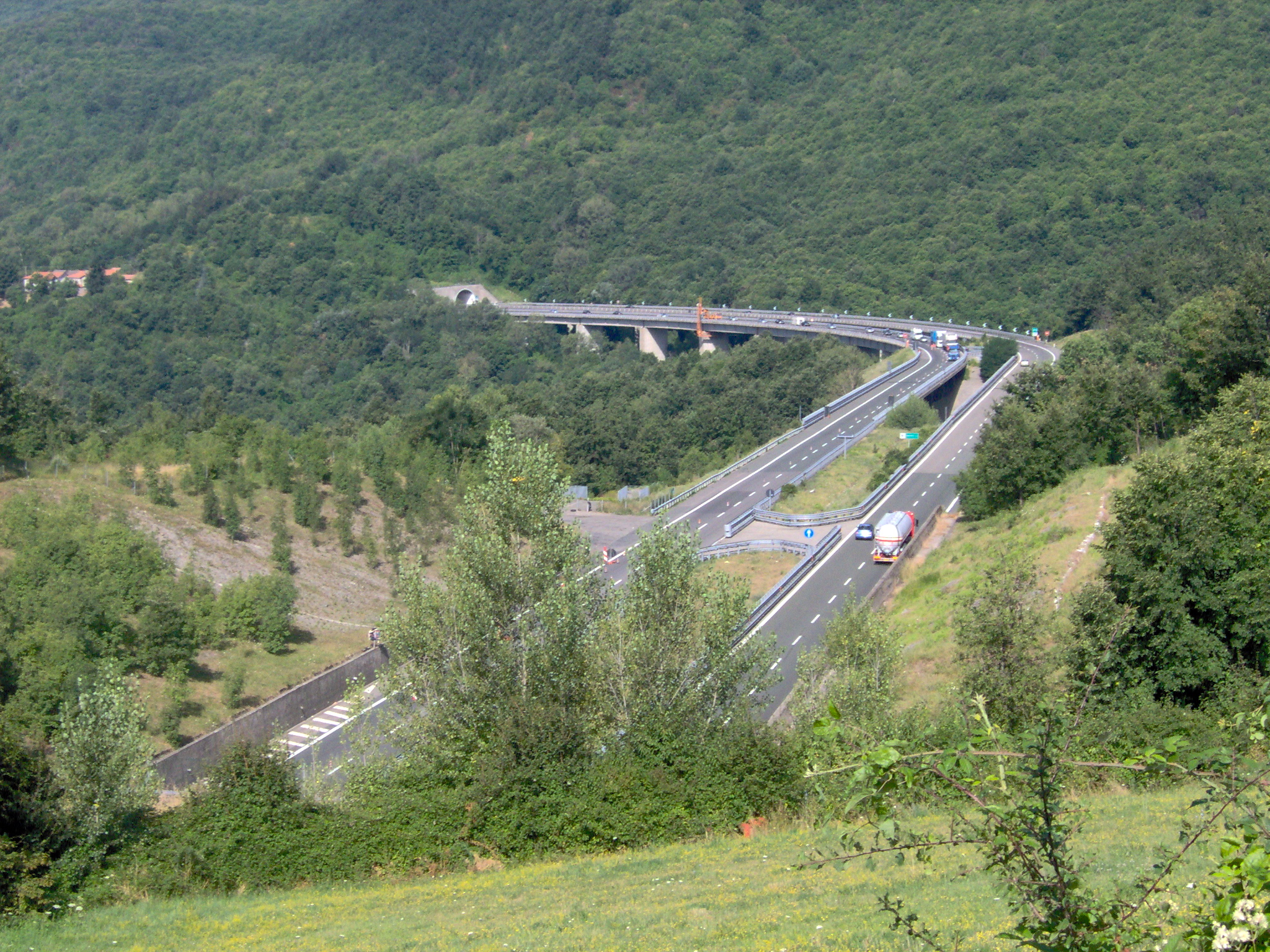
European route 33 near Berceto

European route E33 is a series of roads in Italy, part of the United Nations International E-road network.

It runs between Parma and La Spezia, both in Italy.

It leaves Parma, where it links to the E35 and heads south-west, reaching its destination of La Spezia, where it further links to the E80, a transcontinental route. This is exactly the same route as the Italian A15.

In practice, the number E33 does not appear on any road signs. Instead, its entire stretch is signposted as E31, creating a duplication with the E31 in Germany and the Netherlands. This goes back to the numbering set forth in the original European Agreement on Main International Traffic Arteries (AGR) of 1975, in which Parma - La Spezia was numbered E31 and Rotterdam - Ludwigshafen was numbered E33. These numbers were swapped upon the AGR's entry into force in 1985, apparently resulting from the fact that the Parma - La Spezia route is entirely situated east of the Rotterdam - Ludwigshafen route so that the former should under AGR principles have a number above the former. This numbering change, however, never made it onto Italian signs.
