= Massarosa =

- Comune
- Comune di Massarosa
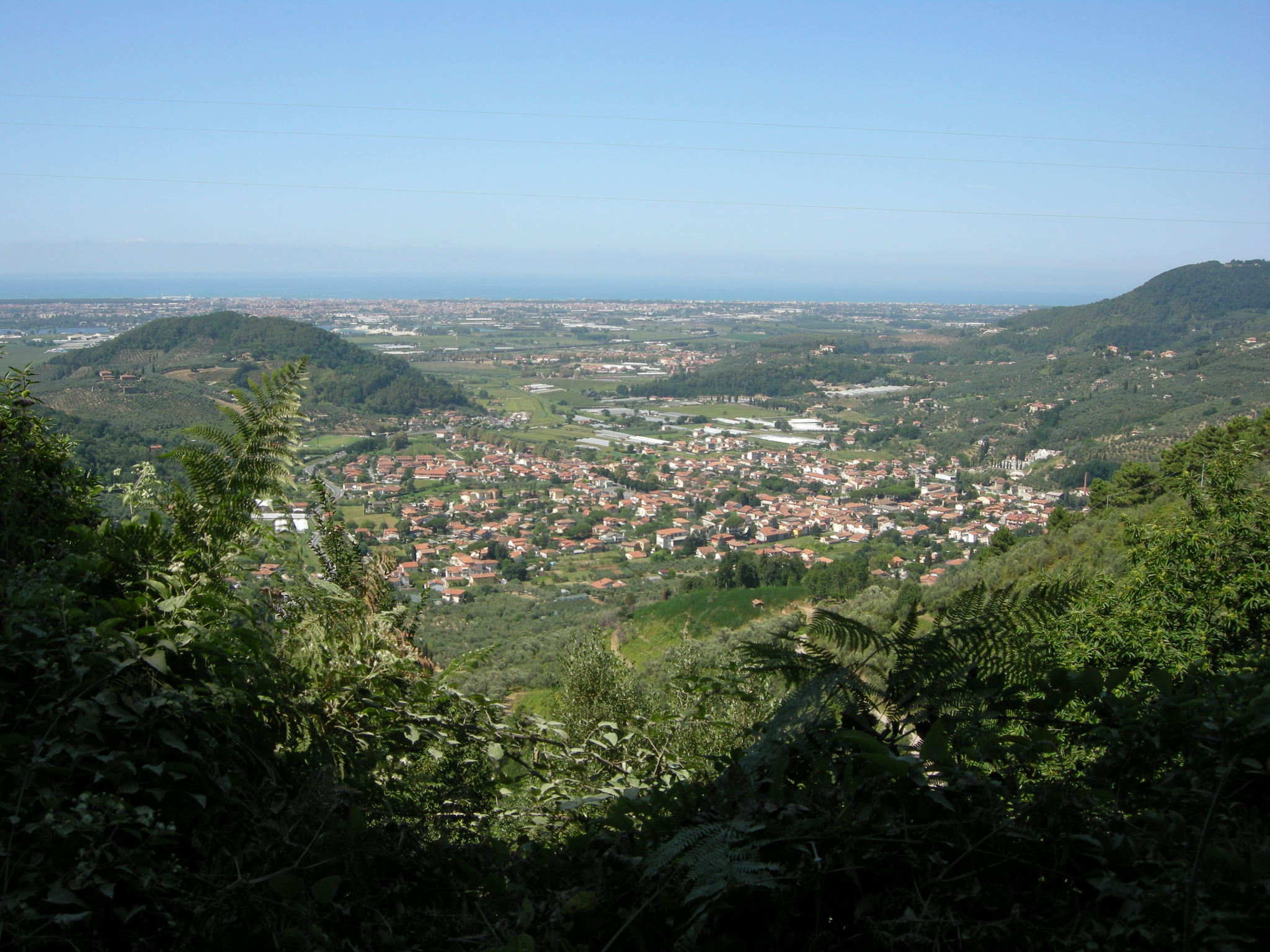
- View of the hamlet of Stiava

- Location within Italy Location within Tuscany
- Coordinates: 43°52′N 10°20′E
- Country: Italy
- Region: Tuscany
- Province: Lucca (LU)
- Frazioni: Bargecchia, Bozzano, Compignano, Corsanico, Gualdo, Massaciuccoli, Montigiano, Mommio (Castello), Piano di Conca, Piano di Mommio, Piano del Quercione, Pieve a Elici, Quiesa, Stiava, Valpromano

Government
  - Mayor: Simona Barsotti

Area
  - Total: 68.27 km^{2} (26.36 sq mi)
- Elevation: 10 m (33 ft)

Population (31 December 2025)
  - Total: 21,782
  - Density: 319.1/km^{2} (826.4/sq mi)
- Demonym: Massarosesi
- Time zone: UTC+1 (CET)
  - Summer (DST): UTC+2 (CEST)
- Postal code: 55040, 55054
- Dialing code: 0584
- Patron saint: Saint James the Greater
- Saint day: 25 July
- Website: Official website

Massarosa is a comune (municipality) in the province of Lucca, Tuscany, Italy and separated from Viareggio on 18 December 1869, becoming an autonomous municipality with all the hilly hamlets and the nearby flat territories..

== Physical geography, landscape and fauna ==
The municipality is characterised by the immediate transition from the coastal lakeside environment, protected by nature reserves, to the pre-Apennine hills. Olive growing, cereal growing and winemaking activities are established there. In the Montramito area, on the border with Viareggio, there are large manufacturing, shipbuilding and advanced technology companies, united in the Montramito Consortium.

It is home to Lake Massaciuccoli, itself part of the Migliarino, San Rossore, Massaciuccoli Natural Park. The lake occupies a large depression created by the formation of the Apennine mountain range and represents the advanced stage of an ancient coastal lagoon, which was sealed off by the advance of the Versilia coastline. The black-winged stilt (Himantopus himantopus) nests near the lake in spring.

In the summer of 2022 a forest fire broke out in the hills late on Monday evening, July 18th, which forced fifty people to evacuate their homes and with approximately 100 hectares burned.

== History ==
The name Massarosa most likely derives from the name of the medieval settlement of Germanic origin that once stood there. The ancient name "Massa Grausi" is thought to derive from the union of "massa," a vast agricultural estate, and "Grauso," the name of the Lombard landowner. Documents have also been found attesting to the presence of a curtis, with all its annexes, at the end of the 10th century. Much older archaic settlements also existed in the same area.

== Culture ==
=== Events ===
The city hosts Massarosa International Piano Competition.

== Sister cities ==
Massarosa is twinned with:

- Gmina Łużna, Poland
- Teià, Spain

== See also ==
- Lake Massaciuccoli

== Gallery ==
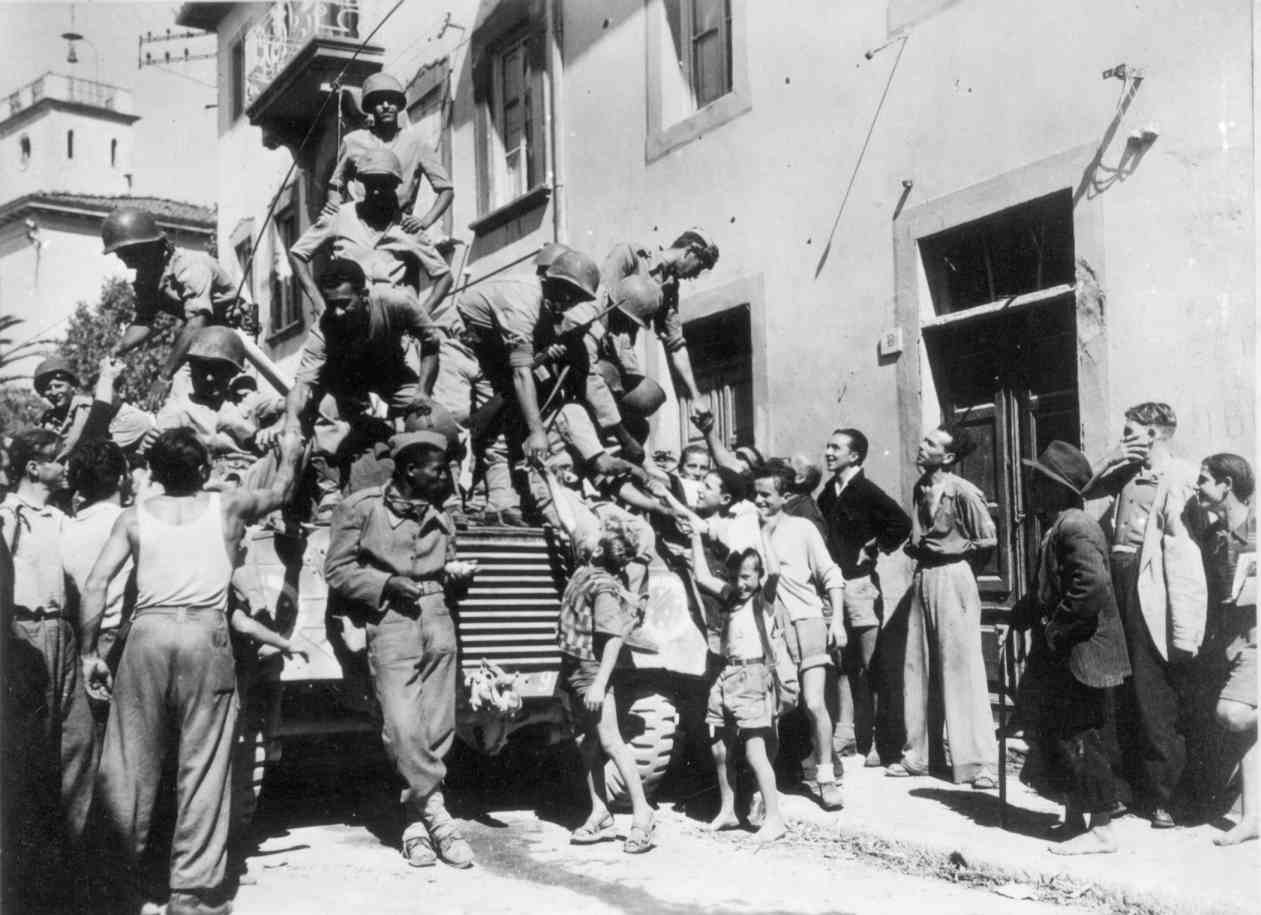
Brazilian soldiers being greeted by civilians in the Italian city of Massarosa in Second World War

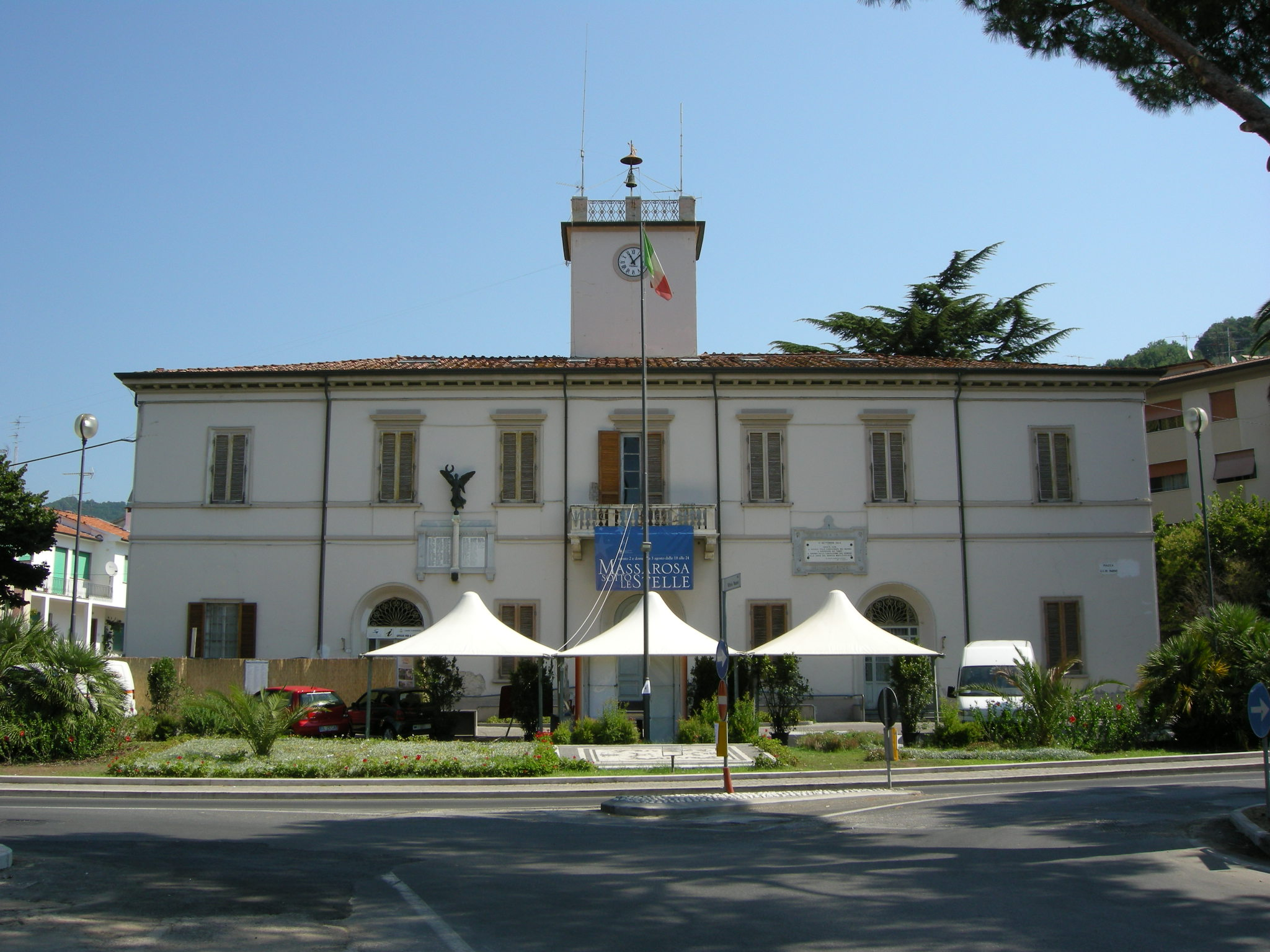
Municipal seat of Massarosa

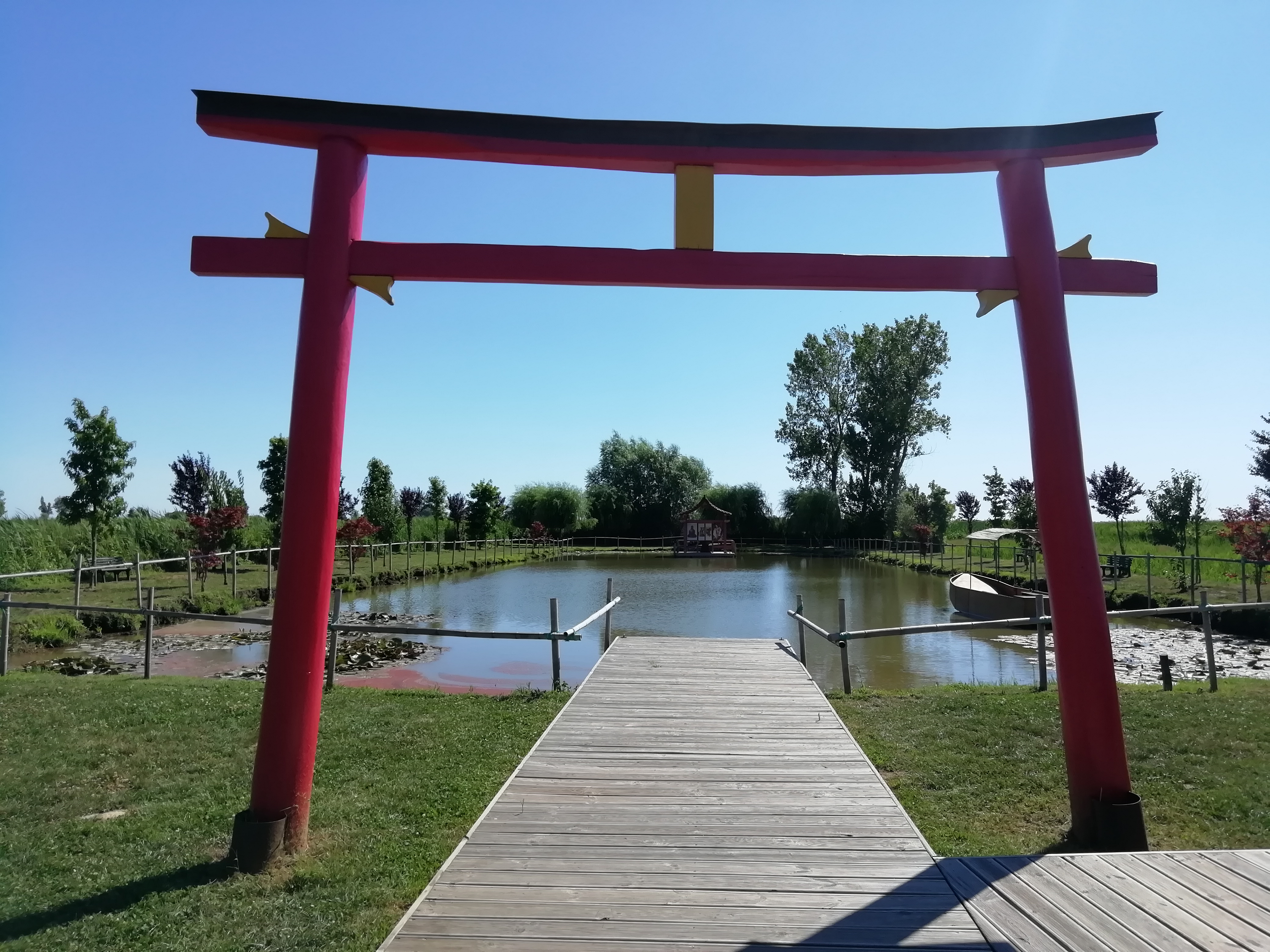
Torii - Portal of the Shinto shrine in the hamlet of Bozzano

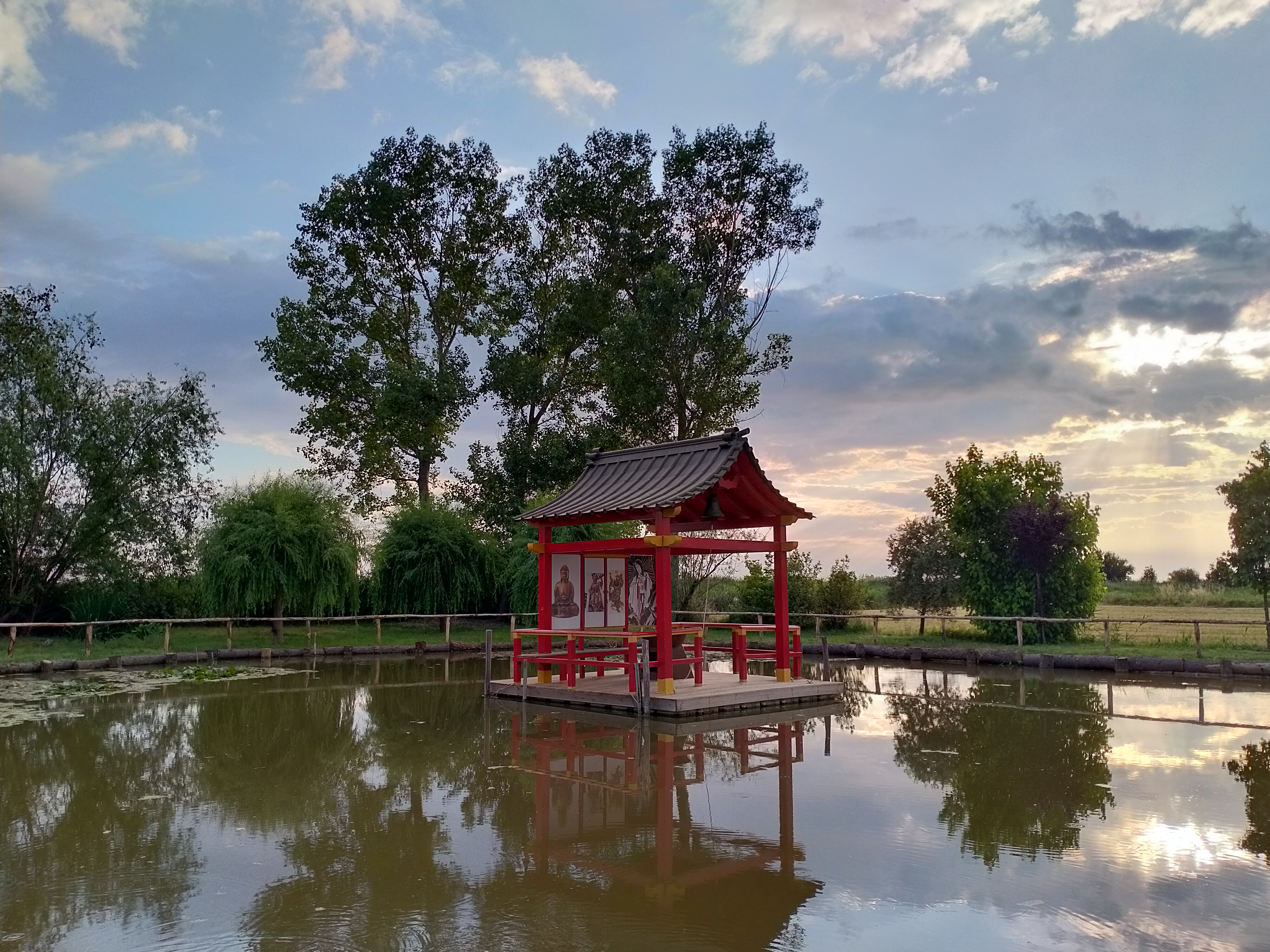
Shinto Shrine of Bozzano
