= Stagno, Collesalvetti =

Stagno
- Frazione
- Location of Stagno in Italy
- Coordinates: 43°35′28″N 10°20′59″E
- Country: Italy
- Region: Tuscany
- Province: Livorno (LI)
- Comune: Collesalvetti
- Elevation: 3 m (9.8 ft)

Population (2011)
  - Total: 4,370
- Time zone: UTC+1 (CET)
  - Summer (DST): UTC+2 (CEST)
- Postal code: 57017
- Dialing code: (+39) 0565

Stagno is a town in Tuscany, central Italy, administratively a frazione of the comune of Collesalvetti, province of Livorno. At the time of the 2011 census its population was 4,370.

The town is about 4 km from Livorno and 12 km from Collesalvetti.

== Bibliography ==
- Emanuele Repetti (1841). "Stagno". Dizionario Geografico Fisico Storico della Toscana. Florence.
