= Port of La Spezia =

Coordinates: 44°6′30″N 9°50′33″E

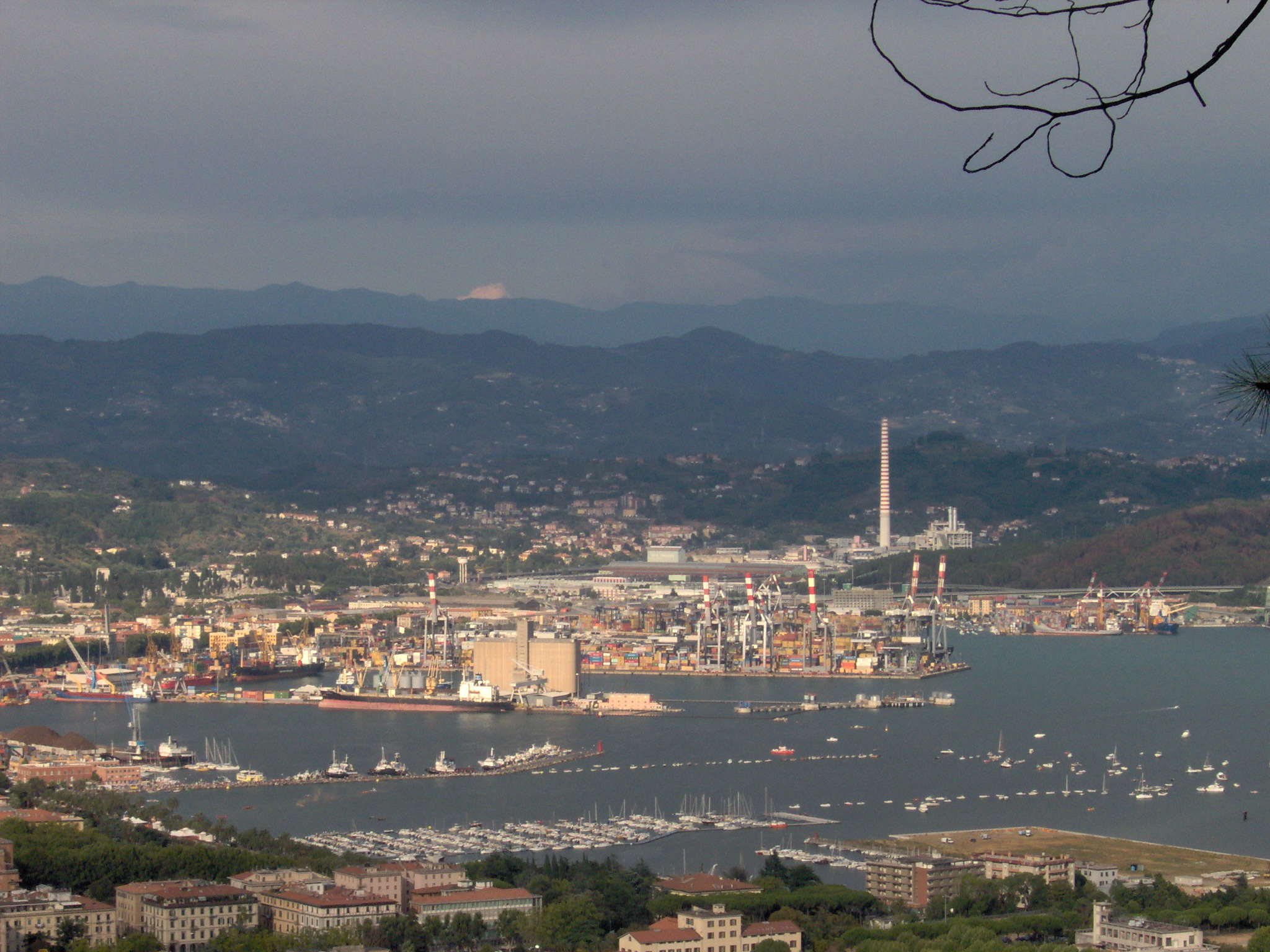
Port of La Spezia

Port of La Spezia (Italian: Porto della Spezia) is a port in La Spezia, Liguria, Italy. The port of La Spezia is one of the largest commercial ports in the Ligurian Sea, and is located in the northernmost part of the Gulf of La Spezia. Its development dates from the late nineteenth century and has since grown to become one of the main ports of the Mediterranean Sea, specializing in container handling in particular. Inside a bay of 1500 hectares protected by a breakwater of about 2.2 kilometres (1.4 mi), the port of La Spezia has 5.1 kilometres (3.2 mi) of quays and at least 400,000 square kilometres (150,000 sq mi) of space. In 2014, 15,700,000 tonnes and 483,564 passengers passed through the port.

According to the 2017 official data, the port of La Spezia was the second Italian node in terms of TEUs movement, preceded by the Port of Genoa with an annual movement of 2.6 millions in respect of a national traffic of around 10.5 millions TEUs.
