= Autostrada A2 (Italy) =

Controlled-access highway in Italy

Autostrada A2
- Autostrada del Mediterraneo
- Mediterranean motorway

- The Autostrada del Mediterraneo logo, also used for reasons of sponsorship and tourism promotions of the motorway.

Route information
- Part of E45, E841 and E90
- Maintained by ANAS
- Length: 432.2 km (268.6 mi)
- Existed: 2017–present

Major junctions
- From: Fisciano
- A30 and RA2 in Fisciano; Spur route to Naples in Salerno; RA5 in Sicignano degli Alburni; Spur route to Reggio Calabria in Campo Calabro
- To: Villa San Giovanni

Location
- Country: Italy
- Regions: Campania, Basilicata, Calabria

Highway system
- Roads in Italy; Autostrade; State; Regional; Provincial; Municipal
← A 1	→ A 3

Autostrada A2, otherwise known as the Autostrada del Mediterraneo ("Mediterranean motorway") or Salerno–Reggio Calabria, is an autostrada (Italian for "motorway") 432 kilometres (268 mi) long in Italy located in the regions of Campania, Basilicata and Calabria. Running between the towns of Fisciano, in the province of Salerno, and Villa San Giovanni, in the province of Reggio Calabria, the motorway forms part of European routes E45, E841 and E90.

== History ==
The A2 was created in 2017 by merging the Fisciano to Salerno section of the spur route RA 2 (part of European route E841) with the Salerno to Villa San Giovanni section of the A3 motorway (part of E45). The spur route to Reggio Calabria is part of E90. At the same time, an advertising campaign for tourism purposes was launched, with ten cultural routes and an advertising spot starring Giancarlo Giannini.

== Route ==
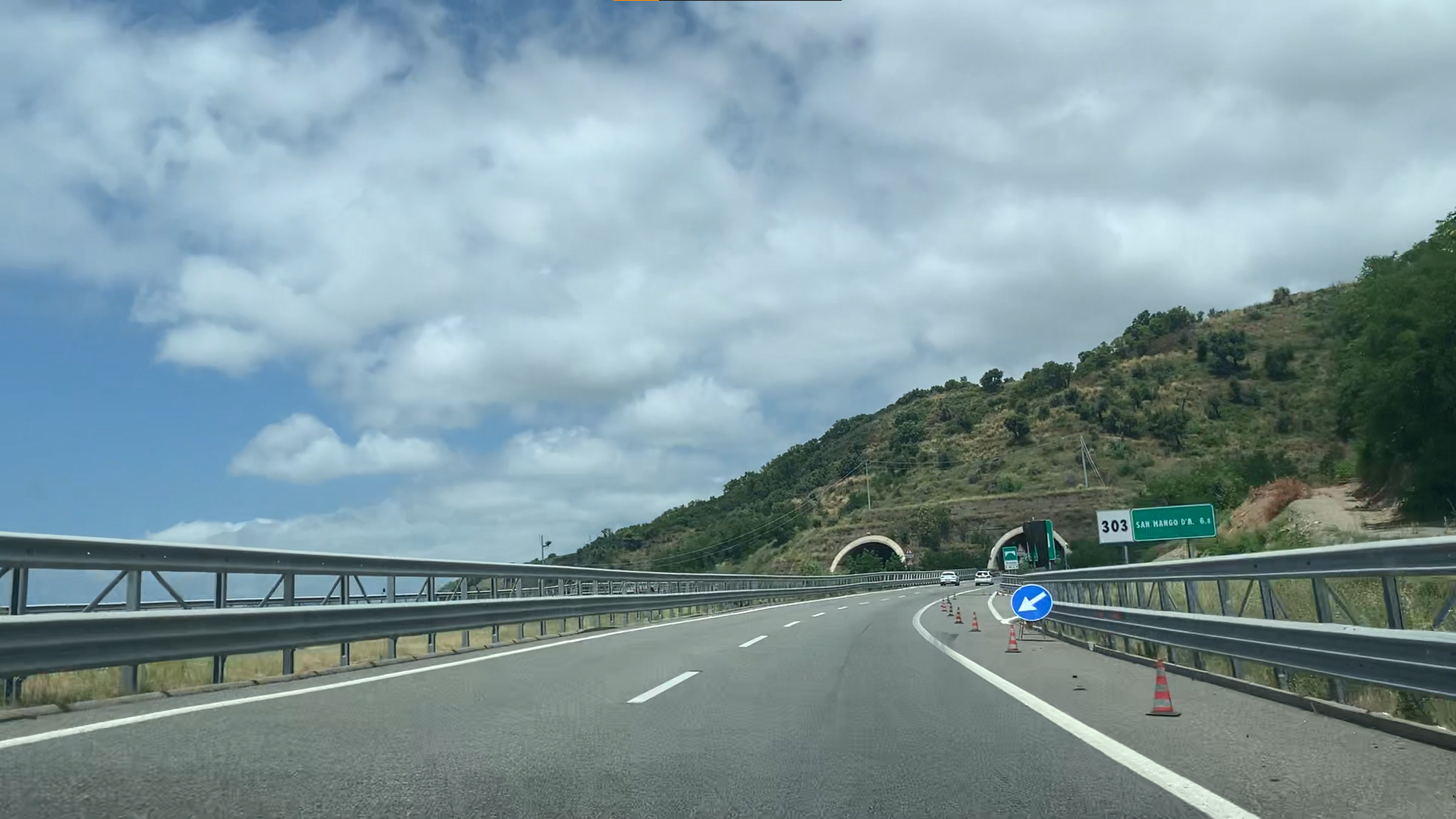
Autostrada A2 near Nocera Terinese

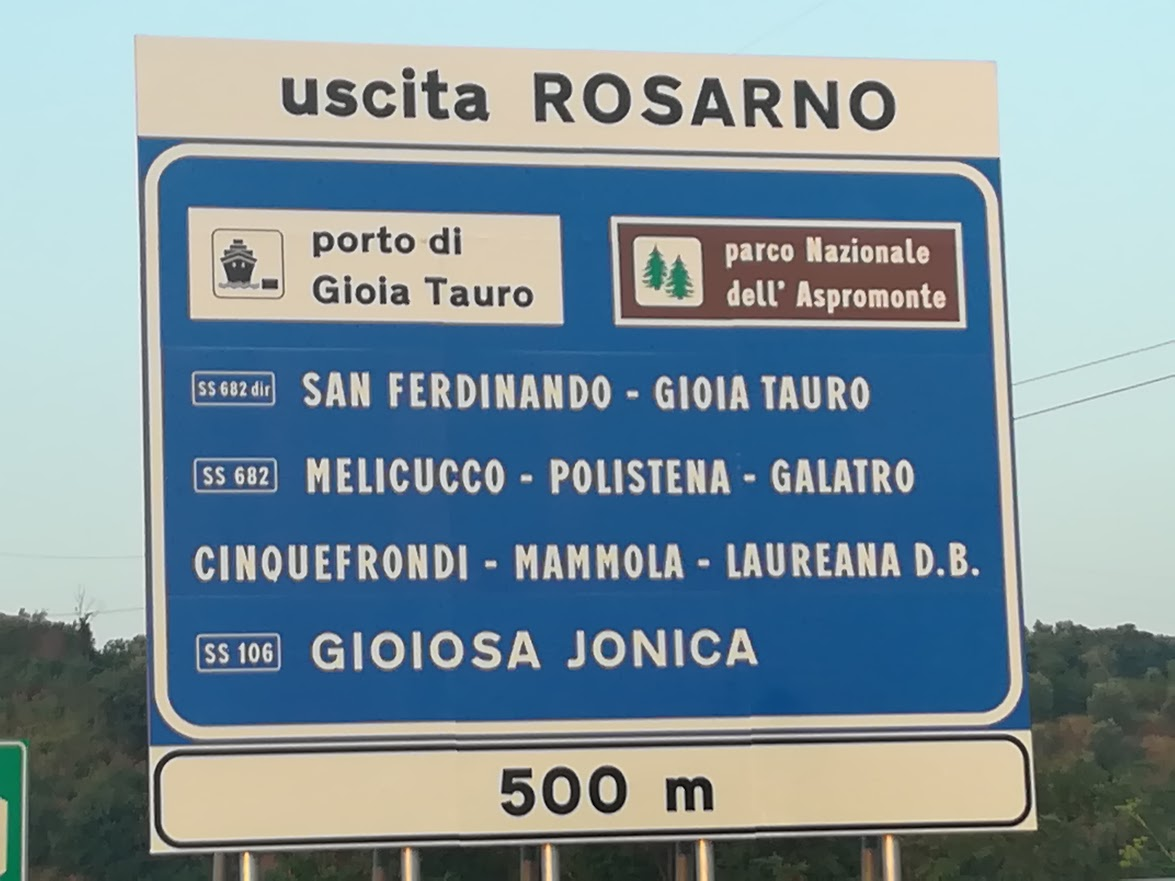
Autostrada A2, Rosarno exit, indicating the reachable locations.

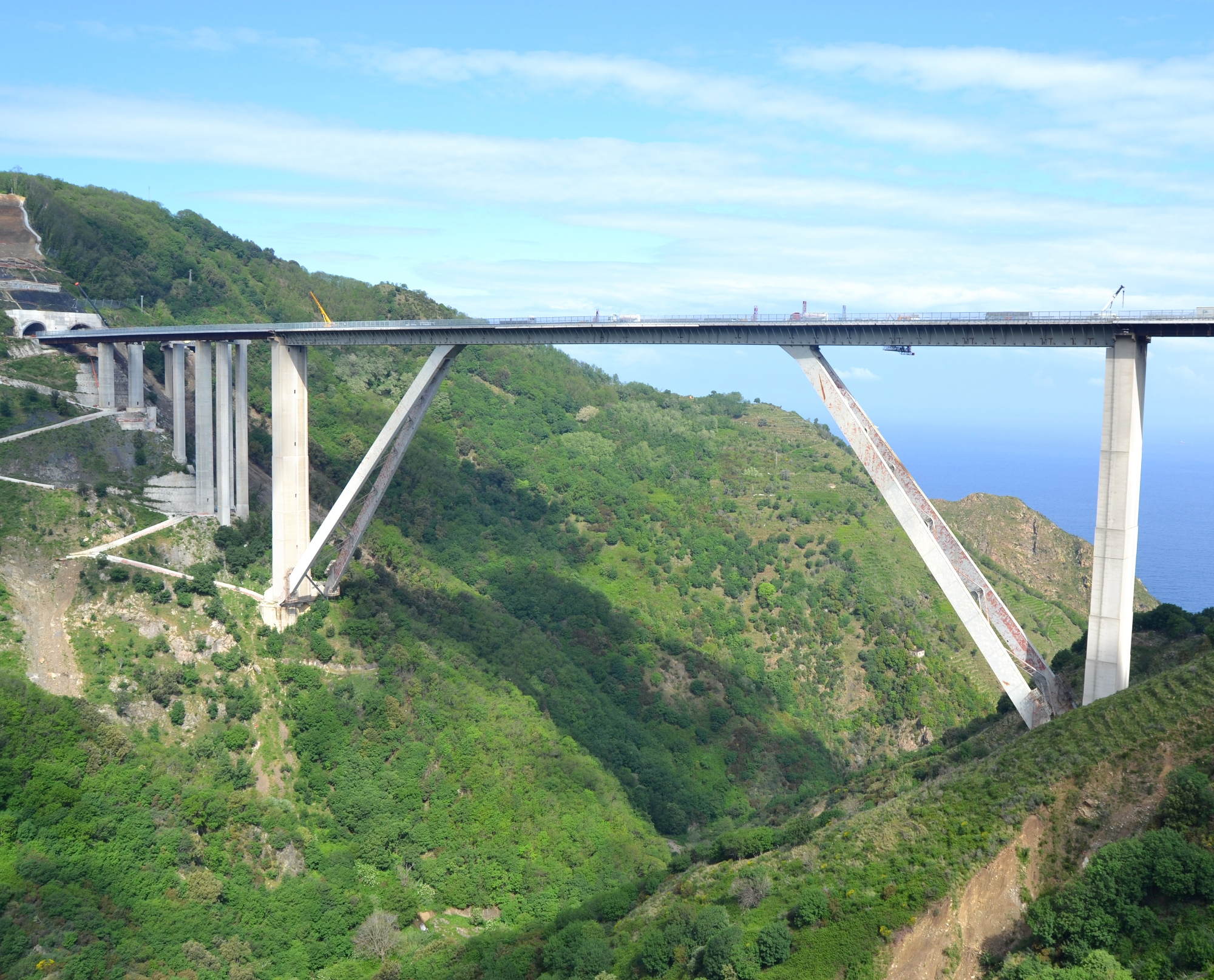
Sfalassà Viaduct in Bagnara Calabra

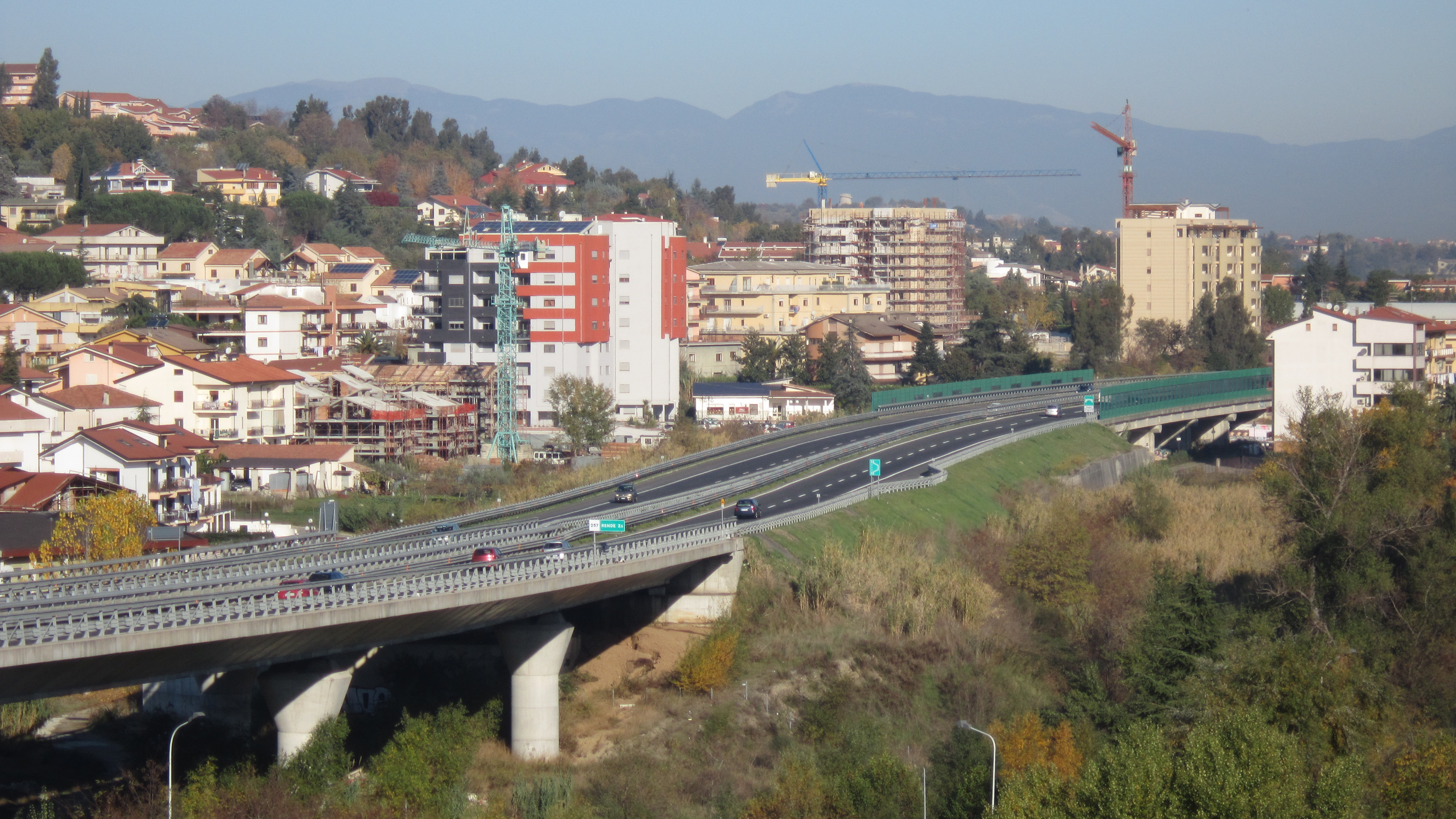
Autostrada A2 near Cosenza

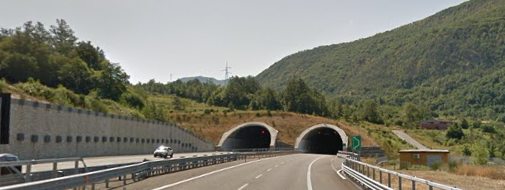
Autostrada A2 near Lauria

The motorway starts in Fisciano, in Campania region, where there is a junction between the RA2 and the A30 motorway.

The provincial capital cities served by the A2 motorway are:

- Salerno;
- Potenza, which is accessible from Sicignano junction through RA5;
- Cosenza;
- Catanzaro, which is accessible from Lamezia Terme junction through SS280;
- Vibo Valentia;
- Reggio Calabria.

SALERNO – REGGIO CALABRIA; Autostrada del Mediterraneo
Exit	↓km↓	↑km↑	Province	European Route
Caserta; Roma; Canosa - Bari	0.0 km (0 mi)	432.6 km (268.8 mi)	SA	E841
Avellino	0.1 km (0.062 mi)	432.5 km (268.7 mi)	SA	E841
Baronissi Nord - Lancusi; University of Salerno	1.3 km (0.81 mi)	431.3 km (268.0 mi)	SA	E841
Rest area "Baronissi"	2.0 km (1.2 mi)	430.6 km (267.6 mi)	SA	E841
Baronissi Sud	3.7 km (2.3 mi)	428.9 km (266.5 mi)	SA	E841
Salerno; Diramazione Napoli; Napoli - Salerno	8.4 km (5.2 mi)	424.4 km (263.7 mi)	SA	E45
Rest area "Salerno"	13.0 km (8.1 mi)	419.6 km (260.7 mi)	SA	E45
San Mango Piemonte	13.5 km (8.4 mi)	419.1 km (260.4 mi)	SA	E45
Pontecagnano	18.7 km (11.6 mi)	413.9 km (257.2 mi)	SA	E45
Montecorvino Pugliano-Pontecagnano Sud; Salerno Costa d'Amalfi Airport	23.4 km (14.5 mi)	409.2 km (254.3 mi)	SA	E45
Battipaglia	28.3 km (17.6 mi)	404.3 km (251.2 mi)	SA	E45
Eboli	35.8 km (22.2 mi)	396.8 km (246.6 mi)	SA	E45
Campagna	41.9 km (26.0 mi)	390.7 km (242.8 mi)	SA	E45
Rest area "Campagna"	47.8 km (29.7 mi)	384.8 km (239.1 mi)	SA	E45
Contursi Terme - Postiglione	51.9 km (32.2 mi)	380.7 km (236.6 mi)	SA	E45
Sicignano degli Alburni; Potenza; Basentana	58.0 km (36.0 mi)	374.6 km (232.8 mi)	SA	E45
Petina	68.9 km (42.8 mi)	363.7 km (226.0 mi)	SA	E45
Polla	80.0 km (49.7 mi)	352.6 km (219.1 mi)	SA	E45
Atena Lucana di Fondo Valle d'Agri	86.9 km (54.0 mi)	345.7 km (214.8 mi)	SA	E45
Sala Consilina	92.8 km (57.7 mi)	339.8 km (211.1 mi)	SA	E45
Rest area "Sala Consilina"	95.8 km (59.5 mi)	336.8 km (209.3 mi)	SA	E45
Padula - Buonabitacolo	108.1 km (67.2 mi)	324.5 km (201.6 mi)	SA	E45
Lagonegro nord Maratea - Tortora - Praia a Mare di Fondovalle del Noce	127.8 km (79.4 mi)	304.8 km (189.4 mi)	PZ	E45
Lagonegro sud	129.9 km (80.7 mi)	302.7 km (188.1 mi)	PZ	E45
Lauria nord della Valle del Sinni	141.1 km (87.7 mi)	291.1 km (180.9 mi)	PZ	E45
Lauria sud Pollino National Park	148.9 km (92.5 mi)	283.7 km (176.3 mi)	PZ	E45
Rest area "Galdo"	151.5 km (94.1 mi)	281.1 km (174.7 mi)	PZ	E45
Laino Borgo	156.5 km (97.2 mi)	286.1 km (177.8 mi)	CS	E45
Mormanno - Laino Castello	165.9 km (103.1 mi)	266.7 km (165.7 mi)	CS	E45
Campotenese; Pollino National Park	177.1 km (110.0 mi)	255.5 km (158.8 mi)	CS	E45
Morano Calabro - Castrovillari Nord	187.2 km (116.3 mi)	245.4 km (152.5 mi)	CS	E45
Rest area "Frascineto"	195.0 km (121.2 mi)	237.6 km (147.6 mi)	CS	E45
Frascineto - Castrovillari	196.2 km (121.9 mi)	236.4 km (146.9 mi)	CS	E45
Firmo - Sibari - Saracena di Cammarata e degli Stombi	210.5 km (130.8 mi)	222.1 km (138.0 mi)	CS	E45
Altomonte	216.0 km (134.2 mi)	216.6 km (134.6 mi)	CS	E45
Tarsia nord - Spezzano Terme	222.3 km (138.1 mi)	210.3 km (130.7 mi)	CS	E45
Tarsia	227.8 km (141.5 mi)	204.8 km (127.3 mi)	CS	E45
Rest area "Tarsia"	228.1 km (141.7 mi)	204.5 km (127.1 mi)	CS	E45
Torano Castello-Bisignano	237.0 km (147.3 mi)	195.6 km (121.5 mi)	CS	E45
Montalto Uffugo - Rose	246.8 km (153.4 mi)	185.8 km (115.5 mi)	CS	E45
Rende - Cosenza nord Silana Crotonese; Sila National Park	255.0 km (158.4 mi)	177.6 km (110.4 mi)	CS	E45
Rest area "Cosenza-Rende"	255.4 km (158.7 mi)	177.2 km (110.1 mi)	CS	E45
Cosenza	261.0 km (162.2 mi)	171.6 km (106.6 mi)	CS	E45
Rogliano	275.0 km (170.9 mi)	157.6 km (97.9 mi)	CS	E45
Rest area "Rogliano"	276.3 km (171.7 mi)	156.3 km (97.1 mi)	CS	E45
Altilia - Grimaldi	287.4 km (178.6 mi)	145.2 km (90.2 mi)	CS	E45
San Mango d'Aquino	295.9 km (183.9 mi)	136.7 km (84.9 mi)	CZ	E45
Falerna	305.3 km (189.7 mi)	127.3 km (79.1 mi)	CZ	E45
Rest area "Lamezia"	318.8 km (198.1 mi)	113.8 km (70.7 mi)	CZ	E45
Lamezia Terme - Catanzaro; Lamezia Terme International Airport dei Due Mari; Tirrena Inferiore; Jonica	321.8 km (200.0 mi)	110.8 km (68.8 mi)	CZ	E45
Pizzo; Vibo Marina ex di Tropea; Tirrena Inferiore	337.0 km (209.4 mi)	92.6 km (57.5 mi)	VV	E45
Sant' Onofrio - Vibo Valentia	347.9 km (216.2 mi)	82.7 km (51.4 mi)	VV	E45
Vazzano; Serra San Bruno	357.9 km (222.4 mi)	74.7 km (46.4 mi)	VV	E45
Gerocarne - Soriano Calabro delle Serre Calabre	360.2 km (223.8 mi)	72.4 km (45.0 mi)	VV	E45
Mileto	370.7 km (230.3 mi)	61.9 km (38.5 mi)	VV	E45
Rosarno; Port of Gioia Tauro; Jonio-Tirreno; Aspromonte National Park dir. Raccordo al Porto di Gioia Tauro; Tirrena Inferiore; Jonica	383.2 km (238.1 mi)	49.4 km (30.7 mi)	RC	E45
Rest area "Rosarno"	390.1 km (242.4 mi)	42.5 km (26.4 mi)	RC	E45
Gioia Tauro	394.0 km (244.8 mi)	38.6 km (24.0 mi)	RC	E45
Palmi; Costa Viola	401.1 km (249.2 mi)	31.5 km (19.6 mi)	RC	E45
Bagnara Calabra di Bagnara Calabra; Tirrena Inferiore	408.6 km (253.9 mi)	24.0 km (14.9 mi)	RC	E45
Scilla di Scilla; Tirrena Inferiore; Costa Viola	422.9 km (262.8 mi)	9.7 km (6.0 mi)	RC	E45
Rest area "Villa San Giovanni"	429.5 km (266.9 mi)	0.7 km (0.43 mi)	RC	E45
Villa San Giovanni; Ferries to Messina di Villa San Giovanni	432.0 km (268.4 mi)	0.6 km (0.37 mi)	RC	E45
Diramazione Reggio Calabria	432.6 km (268.8 mi)	0.0 km (0 mi)	RC	E90

=== A2 Naples connection ===
A2 DIRAMAZIONE NAPOLI; A2 Naples connection
Exit	↓km↓	↑km↑	Province	European route
Salerno-Reggio Calabria	0.0 km (0 mi)	2.3 km (1.4 mi)	SA	E45
Salerno Fratte; Tangenziale di Salerno	0.5 km (0.31 mi)	1.8 km (1.1 mi)	SA	E45
Salerno; Tirrena Inferiore; Port of Salerno; Amalfi Coast	2.2 km (1.4 mi)	0.1 km (0.062 mi)	SA	E45
Napoli-Salerno	2.3 km (1.4 mi)	0.0 km (0 mi)	SA	E45

=== A2 Reggio Calabria connection ===
A2 DIRAMAZIONE REGGIO CALABRIA; A2 Reggio Calabria connection
Exit	↓km↓	↑km↑	Province	European route
Salerno-Reggio Calabria	0.0 km (0 mi)	9.0 km (5.6 mi)	RC	E90
Campo Calabro	1.0 km (0.62 mi)	8.0 km (5.0 mi)	RC	E90
Catona	2.0 km (1.2 mi)	7.0 km (4.3 mi)	RC	E90
Reggio Calabria Gallico; Tirrena Inferiore delle Gambarie	3.0 km (1.9 mi)	6.0 km (3.7 mi)	RC	E90
Reggio Calabria Porto; Port of Reggio; Ferries to Messina	7.6 km (4.7 mi)	1.4 km (0.87 mi)	RC	E90
Tangenziale di Reggio Calabria; Jonica	8.5 km (5.3 mi)	0.5 km (0.31 mi)	RC	E90
Reggio Calabria Nord	9.0 km (5.6 mi)	0.0 km (0 mi)	RC	E90

== See also ==
- Autostrade of Italy
- Roads in Italy
- Transport in Italy

=== Other Italian roads ===
- State highways (Italy)
- Regional road (Italy)
- Provincial road (Italy)
- Municipal road (Italy)
