= Bombing of Reggio Calabria in World War II =

Bombing of Reggio Calabria
- Part of World War II
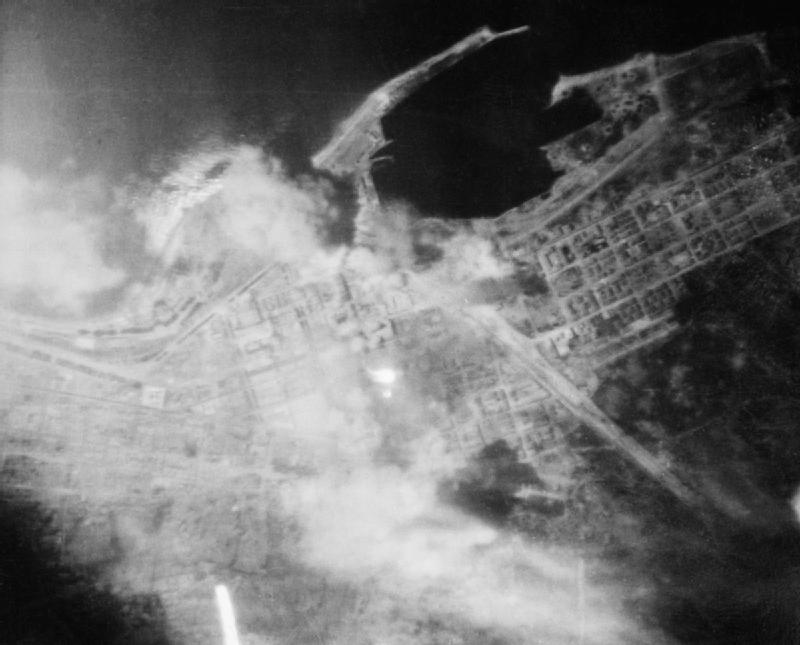
- Aerial photo taken during a British raid on Reggio Calabria in 1943
Date	1943
Location	Reggio Calabria, Italy

Belligerents
United States; United Kingdom	Kingdom of Italy

The bombing of Reggio Calabria was a series of attacks by the United States Army Air Force and the Royal Air Force on the Italian city of Reggio Calabria during World War II. All together, Reggio Calabria suffered 24 air raids, aimed at disabling its port facilities, airfield and marshalling yards, leaving most of the city destroyed or damaged.

== Background ==
Located on the mainland side of the strait of Messina, Reggio Calabria was considered a target of strategic importance owing to its harbour facilities and marshalling yard; some factories and military barracks were also located inside the city, and a destroyer squadron was based there. Macchi C.202, Fiat G.50 and Dewoitine D.520 fighter aircraft of the Regia Aeronautica were based at the nearby airfield. North of the harbour, a bunkering station was located, used to refuel passing ships; ships carrying troops and supplies to Tunisia or Sicily often made a stop in Reggio Calabria.

== First raids ==
Unlike cities in nearby Sicily, or Naples more to the north, Reggio was relatively untouched by Allied air raids in the first two years of the war. The first air raid only took place on 5 December 1942, when RAF bombers, coming from Malta, attacked the air base.

The second air raid was carried out on 27 January 1943, after which air raids gradually escalated. On 31 January the Archbishop of Reggio Calabria, Enrico Montalbetti, was killed by a strafing fighter-bomber while visiting Melito di Porto Salvo. On 3 and 23 February, some bombers attacked Reggio Calabria during raids on nearby Messina; in May 1943 the B-17s hit the northern suburbs of the city, and in mid-June the airfield and the old city centre were hit.

== The May 1943 raids ==
Around 13:00 on 30 April 1943, fifty four-engine bombers dropped thousands of leaflets over Reggio Calabria, urging the population to take to the countryside, as the city would be bombed soon. On the following day, bombers of the 9th Air Force attacked the harbour; another by the 9th U.S. Air Force raid took place a 14:30 on 4 May, when the bombs fell both on the airfield (the objective of the raid) and on the Annunziata, Gallina, Modena, Archi, Santa Caterina and San Brunello districts, without causing much damage.

The raid on 6 May 1943 was far more destructive. Starting at 11:20 in the morning, two waves of B-24 bombers of the 9th Air Force, totalling fifty aircraft and coming from Benghazi, dropped 110 tons of bombs on Reggio Calabria, targeting the harbour. The objective was hit, sinking some vessels, as were the marshalling yard and the headquarters of the local Military District, but many bombs also fell all over the city, especially on centre, around Piazza Carmine and in the Santa Caterina, Carmine, Tremulini and Sbarre districts. The cathedral was also damaged. Over 250 civilians were killed and 277 wounded, most of them in the Santa Caterina district (other sources claim that the victims were six hundred).

On 9 May 1943, between 11:30 and 12:45, forty 4-engine USAAF bombers attacked Reggio and Messina, without causing much damage. Four days later Reggio was bombed again, with damage and casualties. In the night of 19/20 May a nocturnal raid was carried out by RAF bombers.

On 21 May Reggio suffered a two-hour raid in two waves by 9th Air Force aircraft. The targets were the harbour and the airfield, which were hit, but many bombs fell on the city, causing widespread damage and over a hundred deaths among the population. The municipal orphanage was hit, killing thirty-three babies, fourteen wet nurses and one nun.

On 24 May, starting at 2:00, over 200 B-17s and B-24s of the 9th Air Force bombed Reggio and Messina across the straits. In Reggio, the bombs hit the harbour, the headquarters of the military district, the seat of the prefecture, an ammunition depot located in the Modena district, the Montevergine and Spiaggia Carmine districts, the northern part of the Santa Caterina district, and the cathedral. Fifty-two civilians were killed, and hundreds were wounded.

== The June and July 1943 raids ==
On 5 June Reggio Calabria was raided by the 9th USAAF, and the attack was repeated on the following day, targeting the harbour but hitting the city was well, causing the death of fifty civilians. On the following night, the city was raided by the RAF. On 10 June RAF bombers attacked the airfield; another raid followed on 19 June by 41 bombers of the 9th Air Force, targeting the harbour, airfield and marshalling yard. All objectives were hit, but so was the city. On 20 June the RAF carried out another raid, and on 21 June the 9th U.S. Air Force did the same, killing 58 and wounding over sixty. A further raid on 22 June caused fourteen dead and fifty-two wounded. On 29 June the RAF bombed once again the air base.

On 11 July, the day after the Allied landings in Sicily, a heavy raid by 43 bombers of the 9th Air Force destroyed the air base. The invasion of Sicily marked an increase in intensity of air raids; on 12 July eighty-nine bombers of the 9th Air Force attacked the port and marshalling yard but hit the city as well, killing 110 people. A further raid, by thirty-two RAF bombers targeting the harbour, airfield and marshalling yard, took place from 04:00 to 06:30 on 15 July, hitting both the northern and southern parts of the city, causing further damage and casualties. On 16 July over a hundred bombers of the 12th Air Force attacked the marshalling yard in Reggio and nearby Villa San Giovanni. On the following day, the city was bombed by the RAF; on 23 July British bombers raided once again the air base.

Between July and August Reggio suffered eight major raids, prompting 35,000 people to leave the city; another two raids took place in early September, while Allied artillery shelling from the Sicilian side of the straits – Sicily had been invaded by the Allies on 10 July and secured by 17 August – caused further damage. Italian Army officer Giorgio Chiesura, evacuated from Sicily on 13 August, wrote in his diary that "Reggio is destroyed, and I am impressed by its empty streets"; by early September, only 17,000 of Reggio's 110,000 inhabitants were still living in the city. In early September Reggio also suffered naval bombardments in preparation of Operation Baytown.

== Aftermath ==
On 3 September 1943, the day when the Armistice of Cassibile between Italy and the Allies was secretly signed (its signature would not be made known to the world until 8 September), troops of the British 8th Army sailed from Sicily, crossed the straits of Messina and landed on the Calabrian side, quickly capturing Reggio. This marked the end of the air raids on the city. British war artist Edward Ardizzone described Reggio as "a wretched town, much bombed and without the charm of Messina. A desolation of twisted shutters and broken wire".

In less than ten months, air raids had caused 918 deaths and thousands wounded among the civilian population of Reggio, and destroyed or damaged about 70% of the city.

== Bibliography ==
- Vincenzo Larizza, Cronistoria di Reggio Calabria nella seconda guerra mondiale 1939/1945, Reggio Calabria, 1993.
- B. P. Boschesi, Le armi, i protagonisti…della guerra di Mussolini, Mondadori.
- M. Setti, Ali Silenziose, Mursia.
- James Lucas, Aquile all'attacco, Hobby & Work.
