= Autostrada A3 (Italy) =

Controlled-access highway in Italy

Autostrada A3

Route information
- Part of E45
- Maintained by ANAS
- Length: 53.6 km (33.3 mi)
- Existed: 1974–present

Major junctions
- From: Naples
- A1 in Barra (Naples); A2 in Salerno
- To: Salerno

Location
- Country: Italy
- Regions: Campania

Highway system
- Roads in Italy; Autostrade; State; Regional; Provincial; Municipal
| ← A 2 | → A 4 |

The Autostrada A3 is an autostrada (Italian for "motorway") 53.6 kilometres (33.3 mi) long in Italy located in the region of Campania, which runs from Naples to Salerno. It is a part of the E45 European route.

Until 2017 the route was much longer, going after Salerno further south until Reggio Calabria; on this year, this section became part of the new Autostrada A2 and of its two spur routes.

== History ==
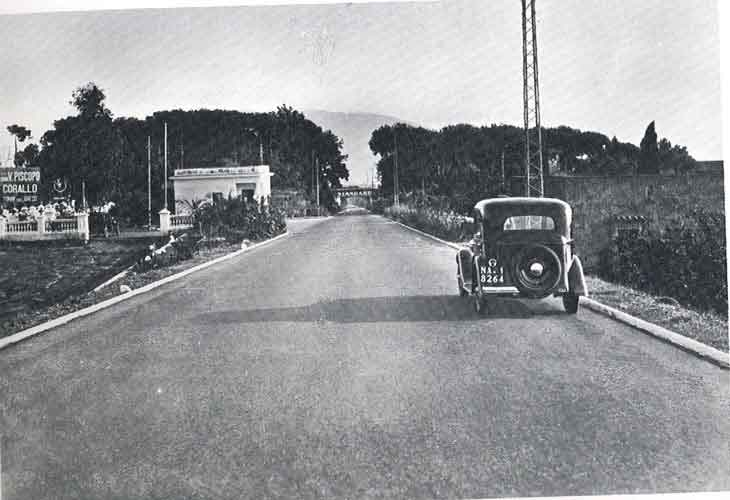
Naples-Pompeii motorway in the first half of the 20th century

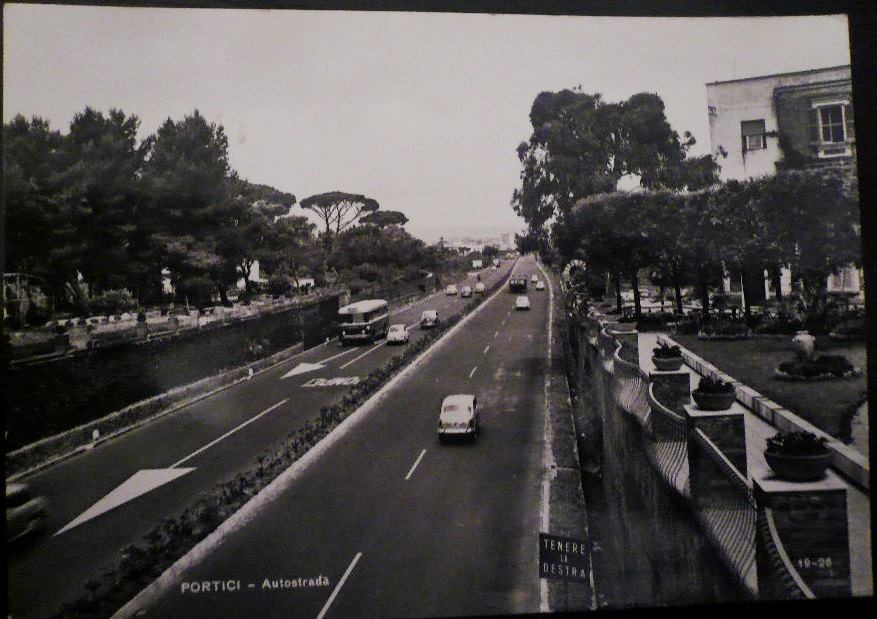
Naples-Pompeii motorway in the 1960s

Due to sections not being originally constructed to anywhere near Motorway standard and to the notoriously poor conditions of maintenance, and also to the difficult terrain along some of the route, the motorway has been often taken as a symbol of the backwardness and economical problems of southern Italy. Italian historian Leandra D'Antone has defined it "a true Italian shame". The European Union declines to classify the road as a "motorway" due to the decades-long roadwork restrictions on a supposedly modern road and seeks recompense for its financial contributions.

The first stretch of the road to be completed was the Naples-Pompeii section, finished on 22 June 1929. The connection onward to Salerno was completed on 16 July 1961. In 1964 the Italian government decided to build a motorway which connected the rest of Italy to Calabria, so far considered a kind of "Third Island" (together with Sicily and Sardinia), due to the nature of its terrain, which made it problematic to reach the region. The new motorway was built in a total of 8 years, the works being delivered on 13 June 1974.

The road built by 1974 was more similar to a sub-standard freeway (Italian: strada statale, "state road") than to the other autostrade (motorways) in Italy. Hard shoulders were absent, curves were often sharp, and in many places merge lanes were absent - the cars entering the motorway instead had to wait at stop signs. By the 1990s the road was severely deteriorated.

=== 1997–2017 Renovation ===
Queues became a common feature, especially in summer. To solve the situation, the Italian government funded the construction of a new route which would remove the high gradients and sharp turns and enlarge the carriageway. This required the construction of new tunnels and viaducts (among these the viadotto italia the highest in Italy) while keeping the traffic on the current motorway open. The reconstruction works started in 1997 and officially ended in 2016 during a ceremony although works continued until late 2017. The EU antifraud investigation of works undertaken between 2007 and 2010 together with the repayment of over €300m to the EU in July 2012 have delayed completion of the upgrade works even further.

The cost of the upgrade (in August 2013) was projected to reach over €10bn by the time it was eventually completed, then envisaged as 2018. The section from Salerno to Reggio Calabria alone, 442 km long, would cost €10bn with the rest spent on widening/upgrades already completed between Naples and Salerno. €7.443 Bn had been spent up to 2011 on parts of the 442 km section between Salerno and Reggio Calabria.

On 22 December 2016 the Salerno-Reggio Calabria freeway was declared complete, 20 years after the first renovation works started, with the opening of Larìa tunnel in Cosenza. In a ceremony held in Reggio Calabria, prime minister Paolo Gentiloni begged pardon "for the delay" and the road name was changed from "A3 Salerno-to-Reggio Calabria" to "A2 Autostrada del Mediterraneo" (Highway of the Mediterranean).

=== Construction ===
The entire road was constructed as a substandard freeway by the mid-1970s and later an upgrade program from Naples to Reggio Calabria started in the early 1990s. The section with three lanes in each direction has a length of 105 km, between Naples and RA02 which goes towards Potenza. The section from the interchange with the A1 motorway in Naples to the Pompeii exit, built during the 1920s, originated as a local turnpike, and was later retrofitted to motorway standard. Many of the junctions along the original A3 route completed in the 1970s had very tight corners and extremely limited deceleration fields; this is especially significant on the now more than 50-year-old Naples-Salerno section, where at some junctions there are stop-signs for traffic entering the motorway. Hard shoulders only appeared along the route as part of the post 1990 upgrades, with only occasional emergency bays at infrequent locations on the sections that have not been upgraded yet.

The concession of the Northern part was owned by Autostrade Meridionali, a company listing in Borsa Italiana and a subsidiary of Autostrade per l'Italia, which in turn a subsidiary of Atlantia. The southern segment (Salerno-Reggio Calabria) is toll-free and is maintained by ANAS, the state agency for public routes. Located in a mountainous area, it is prone to very high levels of traffic (especially at the start and at the end of holiday periods).

=== Upgrade progress ===
Starting in 1997 the motorway underwent heavy modernisation, in many cases a completely new parallel motorway was built alongside the original A3 and involved in most cases a complete rebuilding or replacement of the road where the alignment was retained. By August 2014, works on 391 km of the road (88%) were completed. 16 more km of rebuilding/modernization was then due to be completed. A number of new junctions were also to be constructed, in some cases to service certain towns with no direct access at present. In May 2015 then prime minister Renzi indicated that the upgrade programme would be terminated by 2016.

By March 2016 68 km remained to be done. Plans to upgrade 58 km were abandoned and changed from Motorway Construction projects to "Maintenance" Maintenance will involve pavement and structural renewal and is projected to cost €1bn between 2016 and 2021 instead of the €3bn that ANAS projected as the cost of fully upgrading the 3 remaining sections. These total 58 km of the new length of 435 km from Salerno to Campo Calabro and do not include the final 10 km from Campo Calabro to Reggio Calabria which remains as constructed in the 1970s. Also abandoned were a number of planned junctions. The motorway standard road will terminate at Campo Calabro approximately 10 km to the north of Reggio Calabria, and the remaining 10 km of old A3 into Reggio Calabria will not be upgraded to full motorway standards.

== Major cities ==
A3 goes through many cities, that are Salerno, Nocera Inferiore, Pompei, Torre Annunziata, Torre del Greco, Ercolano, Pompei, Portici, San Giorgio a Cremano, and Naples.

== Route ==
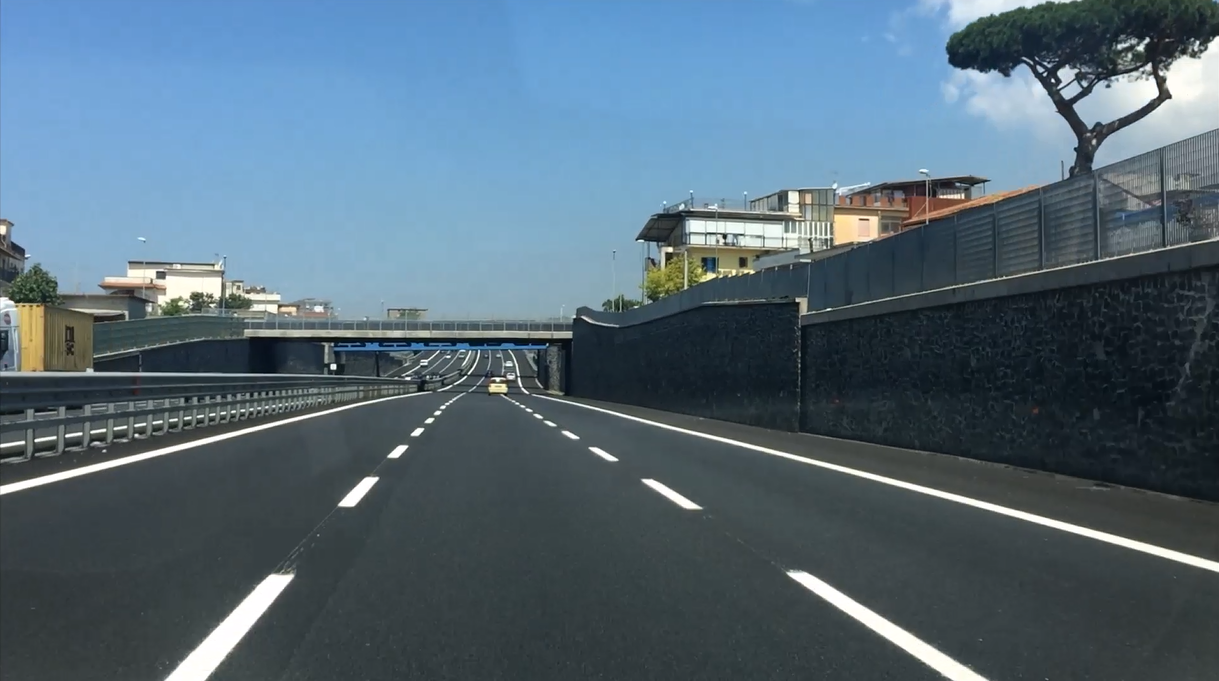
Autostrada A3 near Torre Annunziata

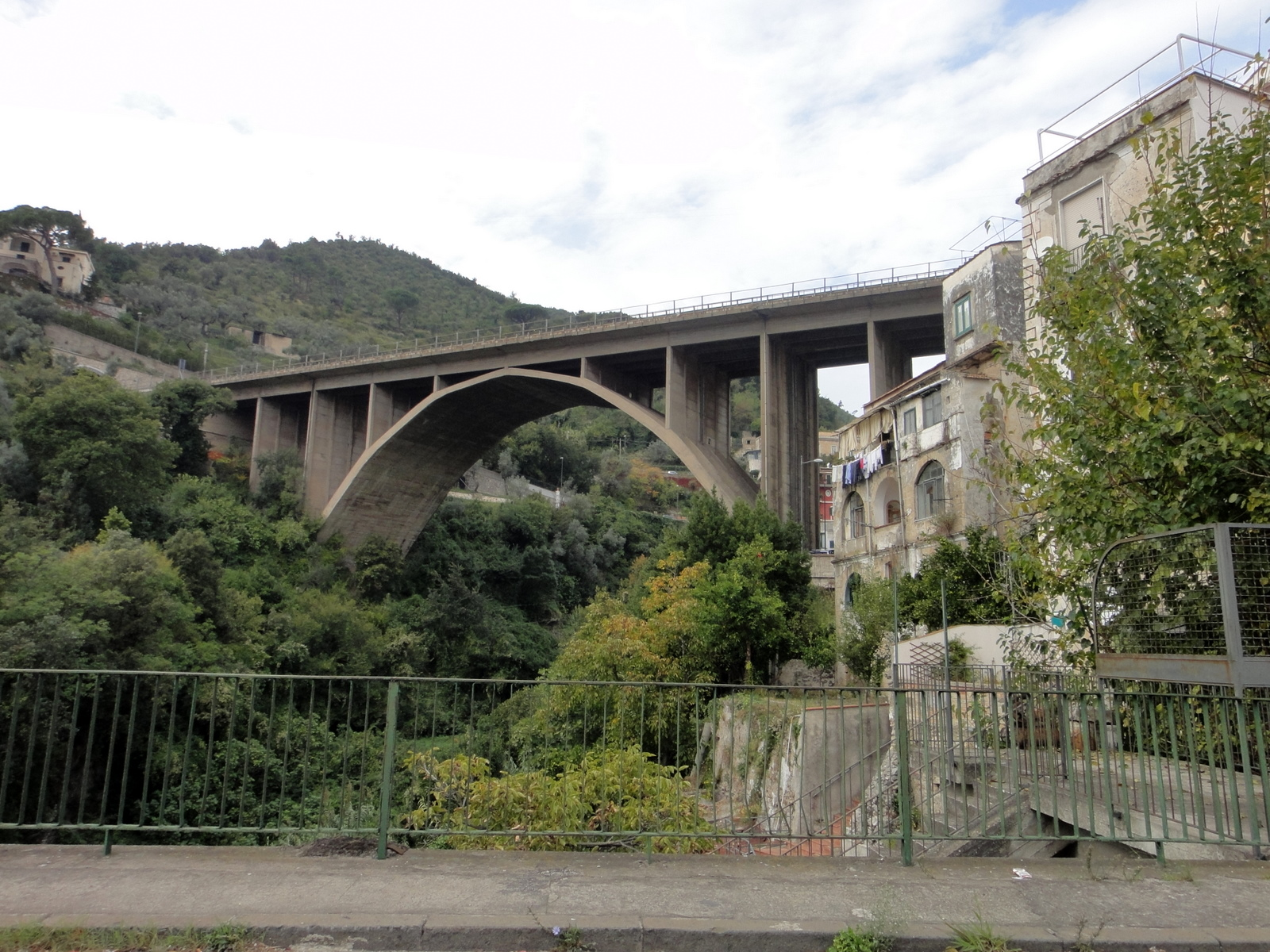
Autostrada A3 viaduct near Salerno

NAPLES – SALERNO
| Exit | ↓km↓ | ↑km↑ | Province | European Route |
| Naples - Via G. Ferraris; Napoli Centrale railway station | 0.0 km (0 mi) | 53.6 km (33.3 mi) | NA | |
| Naples - Via Nuova Marina; Port of Naples | 2.0 km (1.2 mi) | 51.6 km (32.1 mi) | NA | |
| Napoli San Giovanni; Via Gianturco; Naples Barra | 2.5 km (1.6 mi) | 51.1 km (31.8 mi) | NA | |
| Caserta - Roma; Avellino; Bari; Tangenziale di Napoli; Naples Capodichino Airport | 3.1 km (1.9 mi) | 50.0 km (31.1 mi) | NA | E45 |
| Naples Ponticelli-S.Giorgio Nord | 5.5 km (3.4 mi) | 45.2 km (28.1 mi) | NA | E45 |
| San Giorgio a Cremano | 6.4 km (4.0 mi) | 45.2 km (28.1 mi) | NA | E45 |
| Portici | 8.0 km (5.0 mi) | 43.6 km (27.1 mi) | NA | E45 |
| Ercolano; Herculaneum | 8.5 km (5.3 mi) | 43.1 km (26.8 mi) | NA | E45 |
| Torre del Greco; Vesuvius National Park | 11.5 km (7.1 mi) | 40.1 km (24.9 mi) | NA | E45 |
| Torre Annunziata Nord; Oplontis | 15.0 km (9.3 mi) | 36.6 km (22.7 mi) | NA | E45 |
| Torre Annunziata Sud | 20.0 km (12.4 mi) | 31.6 km (19.6 mi) | NA | E45 |
| Pompei Ovest; Pompeii | 21.9 km (13.6 mi) | 29.7 km (18.5 mi) | NA | E45 |
| Castellammare di Stabia; Sorrentina; Sorrento Peninsula; Sorrento - Agerola - Vico Equense | 22.5 km (14.0 mi) | 29.1 km (18.1 mi) | NA | E45 |
| Scafati-Pompei centro Shrine of the Virgin of the Rosary of Pompei | 25.0 km (15.5 mi) | 26.6 km (16.5 mi) | NA | E45 |
| Diramazione del Vesuvio; Angri - Sant'Antonio Abate - Scafati | 28.2 km (17.5 mi) | 23.3 km (14.5 mi) | SA | E45 |
| Angri; Amalfi Coast - Ravello | 29.7 km (18.5 mi) | 21.9 km (13.6 mi) | SA | E45 |
| Nocera Inferiore; Tirrena Inferiore; Nuceria Alfaterna | 36.6 km (22.7 mi) | 15.0 km (9.3 mi) | SA | E45 |
| Rest area "Alfaterna" | 39.9 km (24.8 mi) | 11.5 km (7.1 mi) | SA | E45 |
| Cava de' Tirreni | 42.9 km (26.7 mi) | 8.7 km (5.4 mi) | SA | E45 |
| Vietri sul Mare | 48.4 km (30.1 mi) | 3.2 km (2.0 mi) | SA | E45 |
| Salerno - Reggio Calabria; Diramazione Napoli | 51.6 km (32.1 mi) | 0.0 km (0 mi) | SA | E45 |

== See also ==
- Autostrade of Italy
- Roads in Italy
- Transport in Italy

=== Other Italian roads ===
- State highways (Italy)
- Regional road (Italy)
- Provincial road (Italy)
- Municipal road (Italy)
