= Reggio di Calabria Santa Caterina railway station =

Railway station in Italy

Reggio di Calabria Santa Caterina

General information
- Location: Piazza Stazione 1, Reggio Calabria; Italy
- Coordinates: 38°07′34.86″N 15°39′09.48″E
- System: Commuter and regional station
- Owner: Rete Ferroviaria Italiana
- Line: Battipaglia–Reggio di Calabria
- Platforms: 2 side platforms, 1 island platform
- Tracks: 4
- Train operators: Trenitalia
- Connections: ATAM buses

Construction
- Structure type: At-grade

History
- Opened: January 18, 1989; 37 years ago
Location
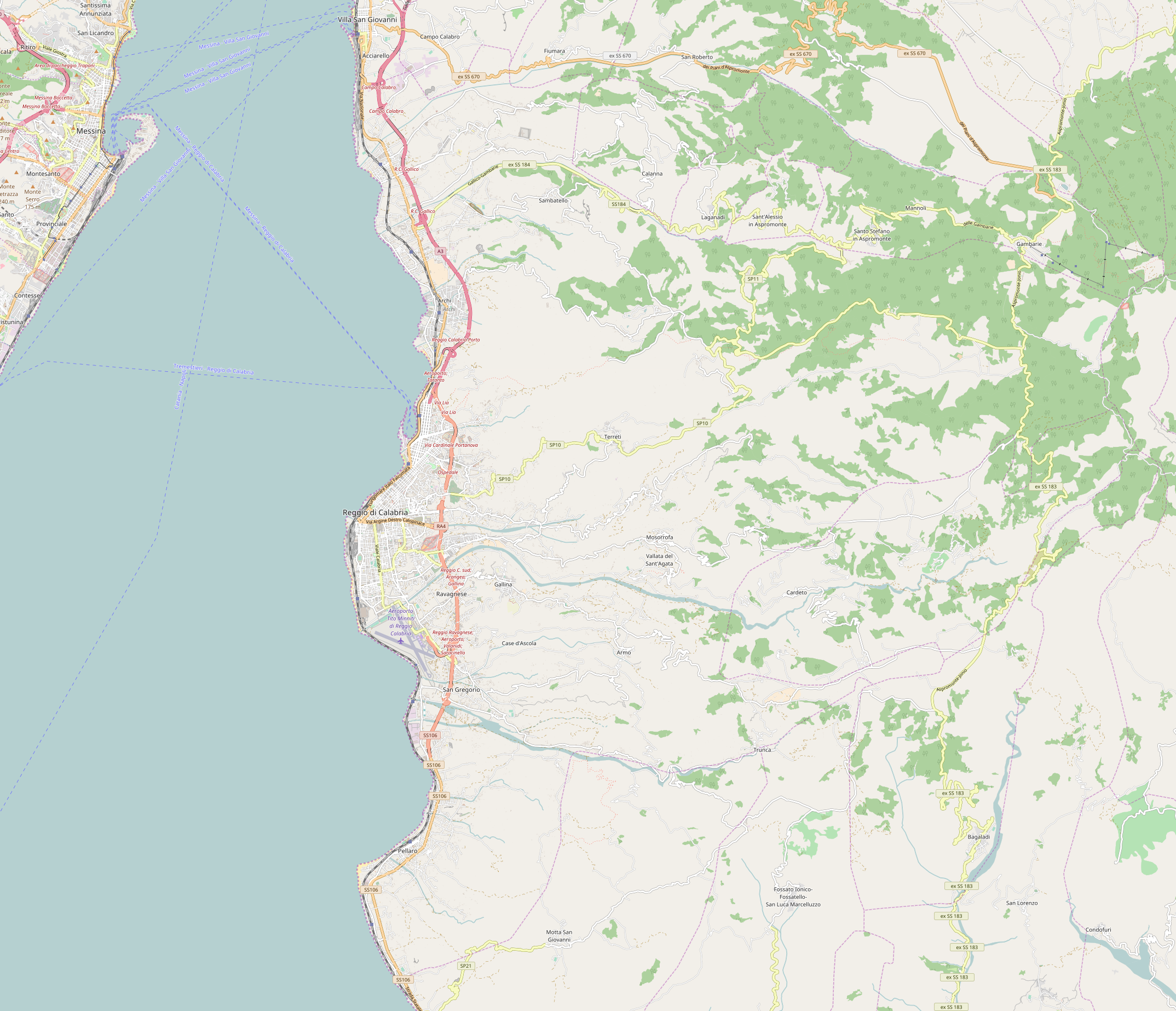
- Location within Reggio Calabria

Reggio di Calabria Santa Caterina railway station (Italian: Stazione di Reggio di Calabria Santa Caterina) is a railway station of the Italian city of Reggio Calabria, Calabria. Part of the Battipaglia–Reggio di Calabria railway, it serves the quartiere of Santa Caterina and the port of Reggio.

== History ==
The station was opened as an infill station on January 18, 1989.

== Layout ==
The station has four tracks, two side platforms and one island platform. Part of the station, particularly the north side platform and the island platform, is located under the spur route Sopraelevata Porto. The station also has toilet.

== Services ==
The station is served by regional and suburban trains operated by Trenitalia.
