= Raccordo autostradale RA2 =

Controlled-access highway in Italy

Raccordo autostradale 2
- Motorway connection 2
- Raccordo autostradale di Avellino; Motorway connection to Avellino

Route information
- Part of E841
- Maintained by ANAS
- Length: 23.6 km (14.7 mi)
- Existed: 1967–present

Major junctions
- South end: Fisciano
- A2 in Fisciano; A30 in Fisciano
- North end: Atripalda

Location
- Country: Italy
- Regions: Campania

Highway system
- Roads in Italy; Autostrade; State; Regional; Provincial; Municipal
← RA 1	→ RA 3

The Raccordo autostradale 2 (RA 2; "Motorway connection 2"), or Raccordo autostradale di Avellino ("Motorway connection to Avellino") is an autostrada (Italian for "motorway") 23.6 kilometres (14.7 mi) long in Italy located in the region of Campania that connects the city of Avellino with the Autostrada A2 and the Autostrada A30 at Fisciano. It is a part of the E841 European route.

== History ==
The road, originally connecting Salerno to Avellino, was built by the state road company ANAS to connect the city of Avellino to the national motorway network at Salerno; in 1967 it was technically classified as a motorway, with the official denomination "Raccordo autostradale Salerno-Avellino" (literally: "Motorway connection Salerno–Avellino").

In 2001 the road got the official number RA 02, actually not commonly used.

In 2017 the section between Salerno and Fisciano was classified as a part of the new Autostrada A2; after that the shorter RA 2 is called "Raccordo autostradale di Avellino" (literally: "Motorway connection to Avellino").

== Route ==
RACCORDO AUTOSTRADALE 2 Raccordo di Avellino
Exit	↓km↓	↑km↑	Province	European Route
Salerno-Reggio Calabria	0.0 km (0 mi)	23.6 km (14.7 mi)	SA	E841
Caserta-Salerno	0.2 km (0.12 mi)	23.4 km (14.5 mi)	SA	
Fisciano Nord; University of Salerno; Mercato San Severino	2.7 km (1.7 mi)	20.9 km (13.0 mi)	SA	E841
Montoro Sud	7.0 km (4.3 mi)	16.6 km (10.3 mi)	AV	E841
Montoro Nord	9.8 km (6.1 mi)	13.8 km (8.6 mi)	AV	E841
Solofra	13.1 km (8.1 mi)	10.5 km (6.5 mi)	AV	E841
Serino	16.4 km (10.2 mi)	7.2 km (4.5 mi)	AV	E841
Avellino-Atripalda di Terra di Lavoro; Napoli - Canosa; Benevento	23.6 km (14.7 mi)	0.0 km (0 mi)	AV	E841

== See also ==
- Autostrade of Italy
- Roads in Italy
- Transport in Italy

=== Other Italian roads ===
- State highways (Italy)
- Regional road (Italy)
- Provincial road (Italy)
- Municipal road (Italy)
