= Raccordo autostradale RA5 =

Controlled-access highway in Italy

Raccordo autostradale 5
- Motorway connection 5
- Raccordo autostradale Sicignano-Potenza; Sicignano-Potenza motorway connection

Route information
- Part of E847
- Maintained by ANAS
- Length: 51.5 km (32.0 mi)
- Existed: 1970–present

Major junctions
- West end: Sicignano degli Alburni
- A2 in Sicignano degli Alburni
- East end: Potenza

Location
- Country: Italy
- Regions: Campania, Basilicata

Highway system
- Roads in Italy; Autostrade; State; Regional; Provincial; Municipal
← RA 4	→ RA 6

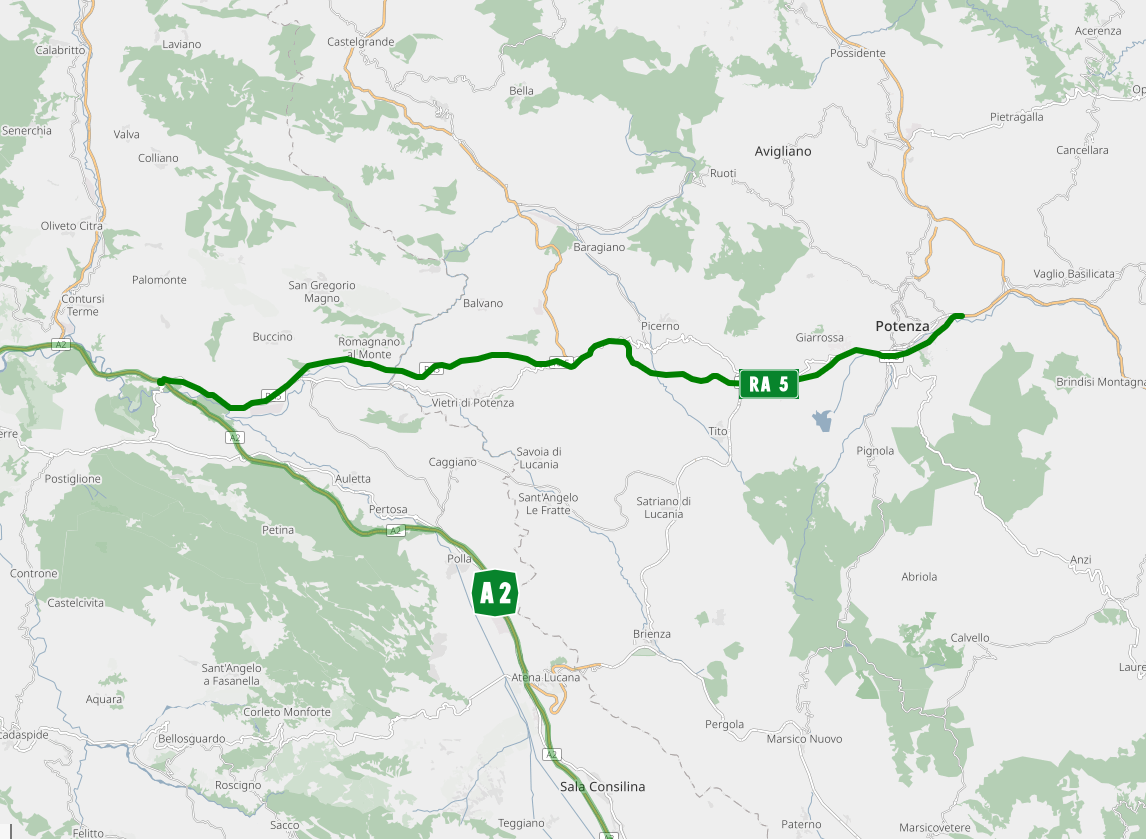
Route of the Raccordo autostradale 5

Raccordo autostradale 5 (RA 5; "Motorway connection 5") or Raccordo autostradale Sicignano-Potenza ("Sicignano-Potenza motorway connection") is an autostrada (Italian for "motorway") 51.5 kilometres (32.0 mi) long in Italy located in the regions of Campania and Basilicata that branches off Autostrada A2 through the junction Potenza - Sicignano degli Alburni and joins the SS 407 "Basentana", which is reached after a journey of about 50 kilometers, almost all in Basilicata. It is a part of the E847 European route.

== Route ==
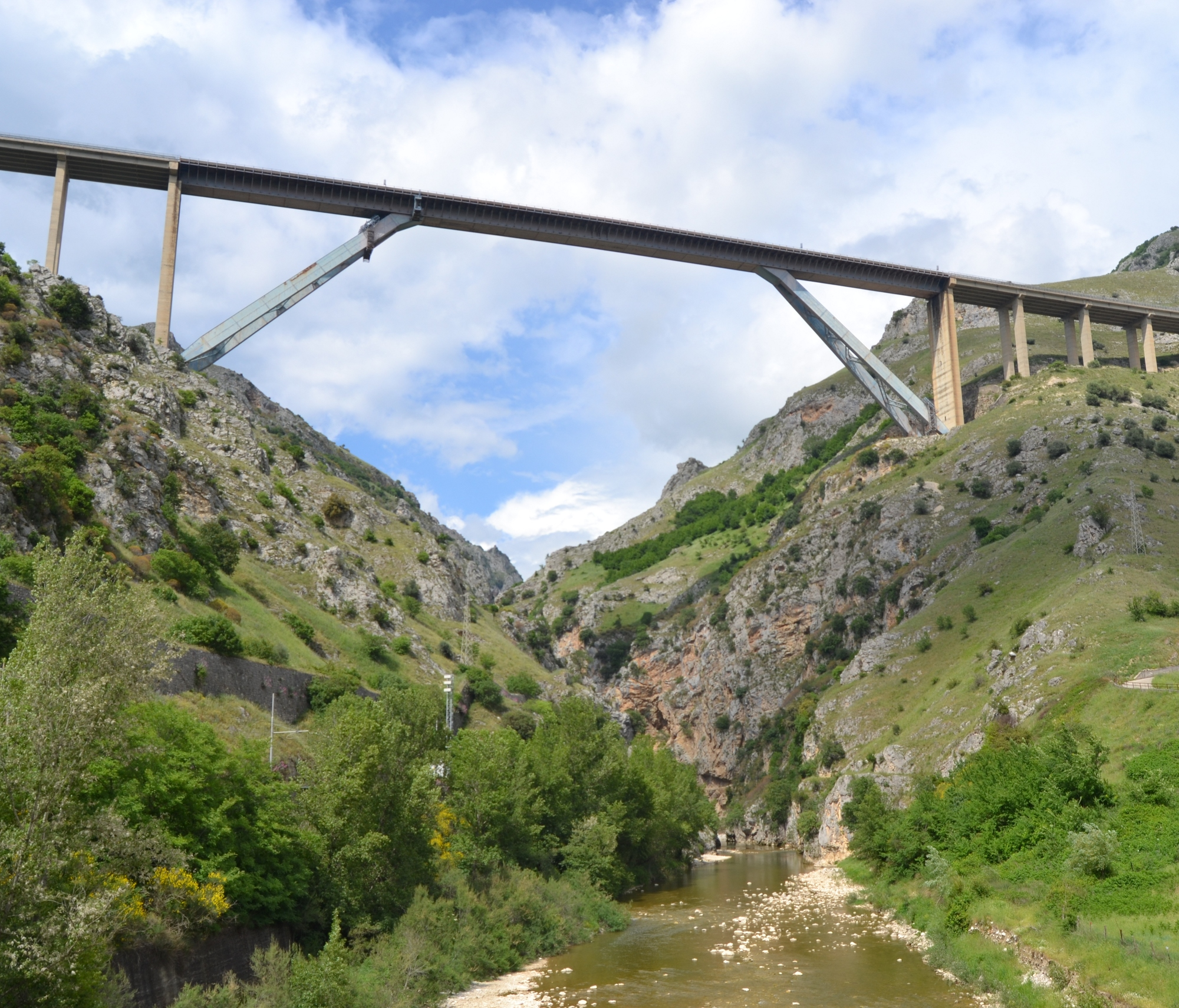
Raccordo autostradale RA5 near Romagnano al Monte

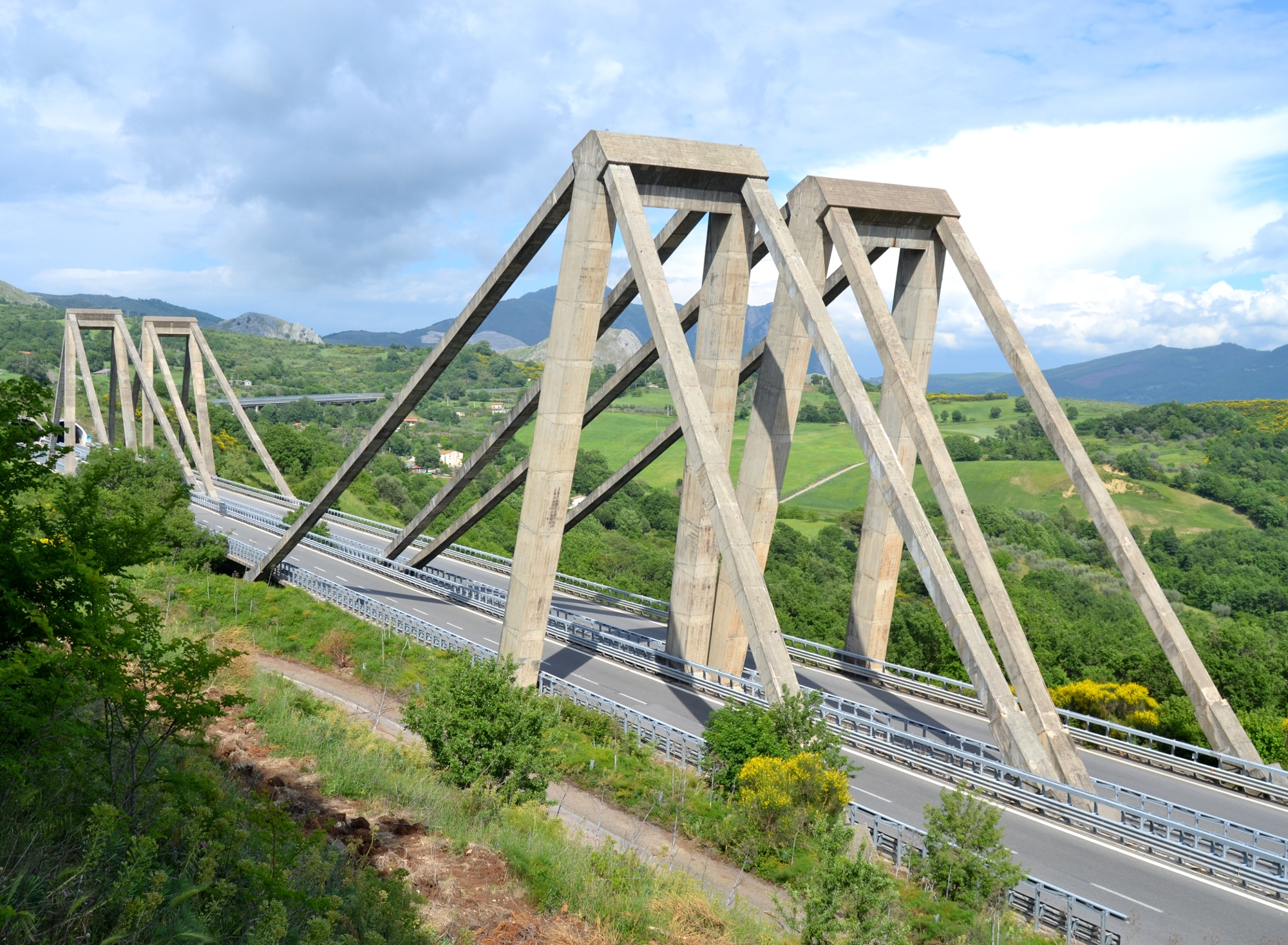
Raccordo autostradale RA5 near Vietri di Potenza

RACCORDO AUTOSTRADALE 5 Raccordo autostradale Sicignano-Potenza
Exit	↓km↓	↑km↑	Province	European Route
Salerno - Reggio Calabria	0.0 km (0 mi)	51.5 km (32.0 mi)	SA	E847
Sicignano degli Alburni; Buccino Ovest; Volcei urban archaeological park	1.0 km (0.62 mi)	50.5 km (31.4 mi)	SA	E847
Buccino; Polla - Caggiano; Auletta - Salvitelle; Lagonegro - Pertosa Caves; Romagnano al Monte	9.1 km (5.7 mi)	42.4 km (26.3 mi)	SA	E847
Vietri di Potenza	23.0 km (14.3 mi)	28.5 km (17.7 mi)	PZ	E847
Balvano; Pescopagano; Vietri di Potenza; Ricigliano; Savoia di Lucania	27.0 km (16.8 mi)	24.5 km (15.2 mi)	PZ	E847
Parking - Restaurant Il Rifugio	--	21.2 km (13.2 mi)	PZ	E847
Picerno; Baragiano; Bella - Muro Lucano; Pescopagano	34.0 km (21.1 mi)	17.5 km (10.9 mi)	PZ	E847
Tito; Picerno; Sant'Angelo Le Fratte; Satriano di Lucania - Brienza; Atena Lucana	42.0 km (26.1 mi)	9.5 km (5.9 mi)	PZ	E847
Tito Zona Industriale; Tito industrial area	45.0 km (28.0 mi)	6.5 km (4.0 mi)	PZ	E847
Tito Scalo; Tito railway station Picerno - Potenza	--	6.4 km (4.0 mi)	PZ	E847
Potenza Ovest; San Carlo Hospital; Regional Offices	46.1 km (28.6 mi)	5.4 km (3.4 mi)	PZ	E847
Laurenzana; Corleto Perticara; Anzi; Pignola; Rifreddo-Sellata forest	46.5 km (28.9 mi)	--	PZ	E847
Rest area "Rossellino"	47.3 km (29.4 mi)	4.2 km (2.6 mi)	PZ	E847
Potenza Centro; Via Marconi; Alfredo Viviani Stadium; Industrial area Potenza Centrale railway station	50.6 km (31.4 mi)	2.0 km (1.2 mi)	PZ	E847
Rest area Parking; Hotel Congress Center	50.5 km (31.4 mi)	1.9 km (1.2 mi)	PZ	E847
Potenza Bucaletto	50.7 km (31.5 mi)	1.8 km (1.1 mi)	PZ	E847
Potenza Est; Via Appia; Rione Betlemme; Rione Santa Maria; Rione Verderuolo	51.2 km (31.8 mi)	0.3 km (0.19 mi)	PZ	E847
Variante di Potenza	51.5 km (32.0 mi)	0.0 km (0 mi)	PZ	E847

== See also ==
- Autostrade of Italy
- Roads in Italy
- Transport in Italy

=== Other Italian roads ===
- State highways (Italy)
- Regional road (Italy)
- Provincial road (Italy)
- Municipal road (Italy)
