= Autostrada A16 (Italy) =

Controlled-access highway in Italy

Autostrada A16
- Autostrada dei Due Mari; Two seas motorway

Route information
- Part of E842
- Maintained by ANAS
- Length: 172.5 km (107.2 mi)
- Existed: 1969–present

Major junctions
- West end: Naples
- A1 in Afragola; A1, A2 and A30 in Nola; A2 and RA 2 in Avellino; RA 9 in Benevento; A12 in Cerignola
- East end: Canosa di Puglia

Location
- Country: Italy
- Regions: Campania, Apulia

Highway system
- Roads in Italy; Autostrade; State; Regional; Provincial; Municipal
← A 15	→ A 17

The Autostrada A16 or Autostrada dei Due Mari ("Two seas motorway") is an autostrada (Italian for "motorway") 172.5 kilometres (107.2 mi) long in Italy located in the regions of Campania and Apulia connecting Naples to Canosa di Puglia, before merging with the Autostrada A14.

The road is also known as "Autostrada dei Due Mari" ("Two seas motorway") because it connects Naples, on the Tyrrhenian coast, with Bari, on the Adriatic coast. It is a part of the E842 European route.

On the night of 28 July 2013, a serious traffic accident occurred on the A16 near Avellino when a coach carrying pilgrims fell off a flyover into a ravine. At least 39 people, including the driver, were killed and many others injured.

The acclaimed A16 Restaurants in San Francisco and Oakland, California, feature food from Campania region and are named for this motorway.

== Route ==
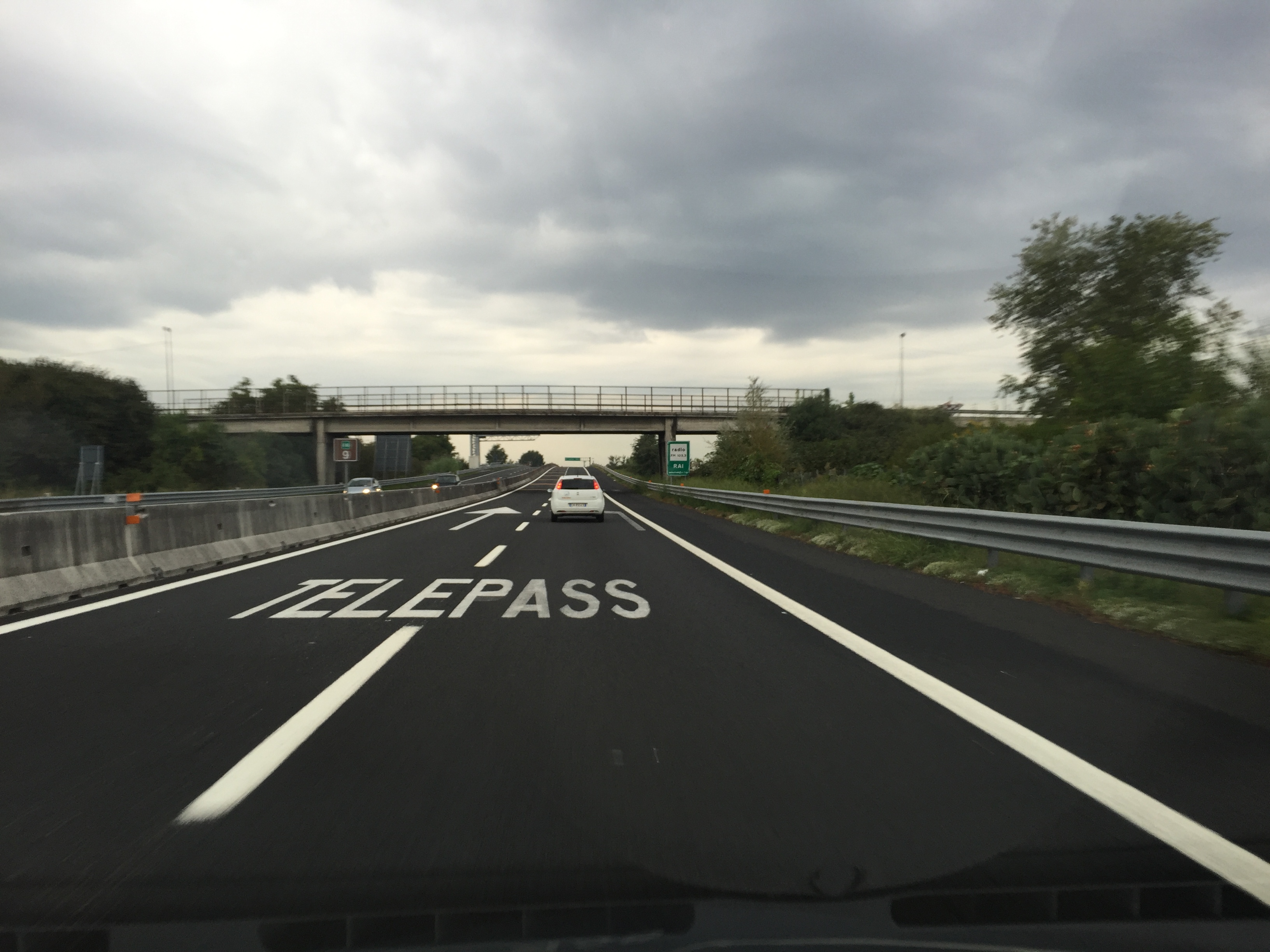
Autostrada A16 near Pomigliano d'Arco

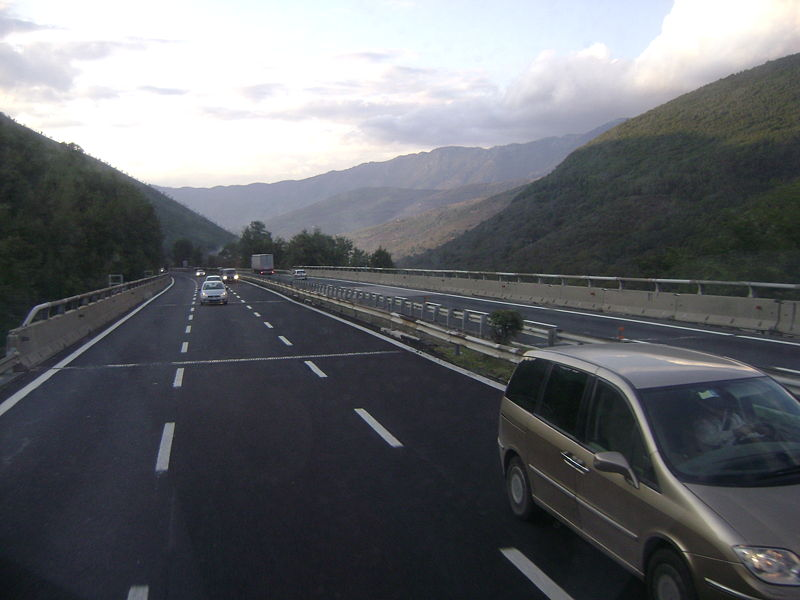
Autostrada A16 near Baiano

NAPOLI – CANOSA; Autostrada dei due mari
Exit	↓km↓	↑km↑	Province	European route
Milano - Napoli	0.0 km (0 mi)	172.5 km (107.2 mi)	NA	E842
Rest area "Vesuvio"	4.0 km (2.5 mi)	168.0 km (104.4 mi)	NA	E842
Pomigliano d'Arco	7.0 km (4.3 mi)	165.0 km (102.5 mi)	NA	E842
Toll gate Napoli est	13.1 km (1.9 mi)	158.9 km (98.7 mi)	NA	E842
Caserta - Salerno; Roma; Reggio Calabria	16.0 km (9.9 mi)	156.0 km (96.9 mi)	NA	E842
Tufino	22.5 km (14.0 mi)	149.5 km (92.9 mi)	NA	E842
Baiano	26.0 km (16.2 mi)	146.0 km (90.7 mi)	AV	E842
Avellino ovest	41.0 km (25.5 mi)	131.0 km (81.4 mi)	AV	E842
Rest area "Irpinia"	44.0 km (27.3 mi)	128.0 km (79.5 mi)	AV	E842
Avellino est Salerno; Reggio Calabria	49.5 km (30.8 mi)	125.3 km (77.9 mi)	AV	E842
Benevento	68.6 km (42.6 mi)	103.9 km (64.6 mi)	AV	E842
Rest area "Mirabella"	77.0 km (47.8 mi)	95.0 km (59.0 mi)	AV	E842
Grottaminarda delle Puglie - Ariano Irpino	81.0 km (50.3 mi)	91.0 km (56.5 mi)	AV	E842
Vallata	104.0 km (64.6 mi)	68.0 km (42.3 mi)	AV	E842
Rest area "Calaggio"	106.0 km (65.9 mi)	66.0 km (41.0 mi)	AV	E842
Lacedonia	111.0 km (69.0 mi)	61.0 km (37.9 mi)	AV	E842
Candela; Bradanica - Foggia - Matera	128.0 km (79.5 mi)	44.0 km (27.3 mi)	FG	E842
Rest area "Ofanto"	153.0 km (95.1 mi)	19.0 km (11.8 mi)	FG	E842
Cerignola ovest	160.0 km (99.4 mi)	12.0 km (7.5 mi)	FG	E842
Bologna - Taranto	172.5 km (107.2 mi)	0.0 km (0 mi)	FG	E842

== See also ==
- Autostrade of Italy
- Roads in Italy
- Transport in Italy

=== Other Italian roads ===
- State highways (Italy)
- Regional road (Italy)
- Provincial road (Italy)
- Municipal road (Italy)
