= Raccordo autostradale RA3 =

Controlled-access highway in Italy

Raccordo autostradale 3
- Motorway connection 3
- Raccordo autostradale Siena–Firenze; Motorway connection Siena–Florence

Route information
- Maintained by ANAS
- Length: 56.3 km (35.0 mi)
- Existed: 1964–present

Major junctions
- South end: Siena
- A1 in Florence
- North end: Florence

Location
- Country: Italy
- Regions: Tuscany

Highway system
- Roads in Italy; Autostrade; State; Regional; Provincial; Municipal
← RA 2	→ RA 4

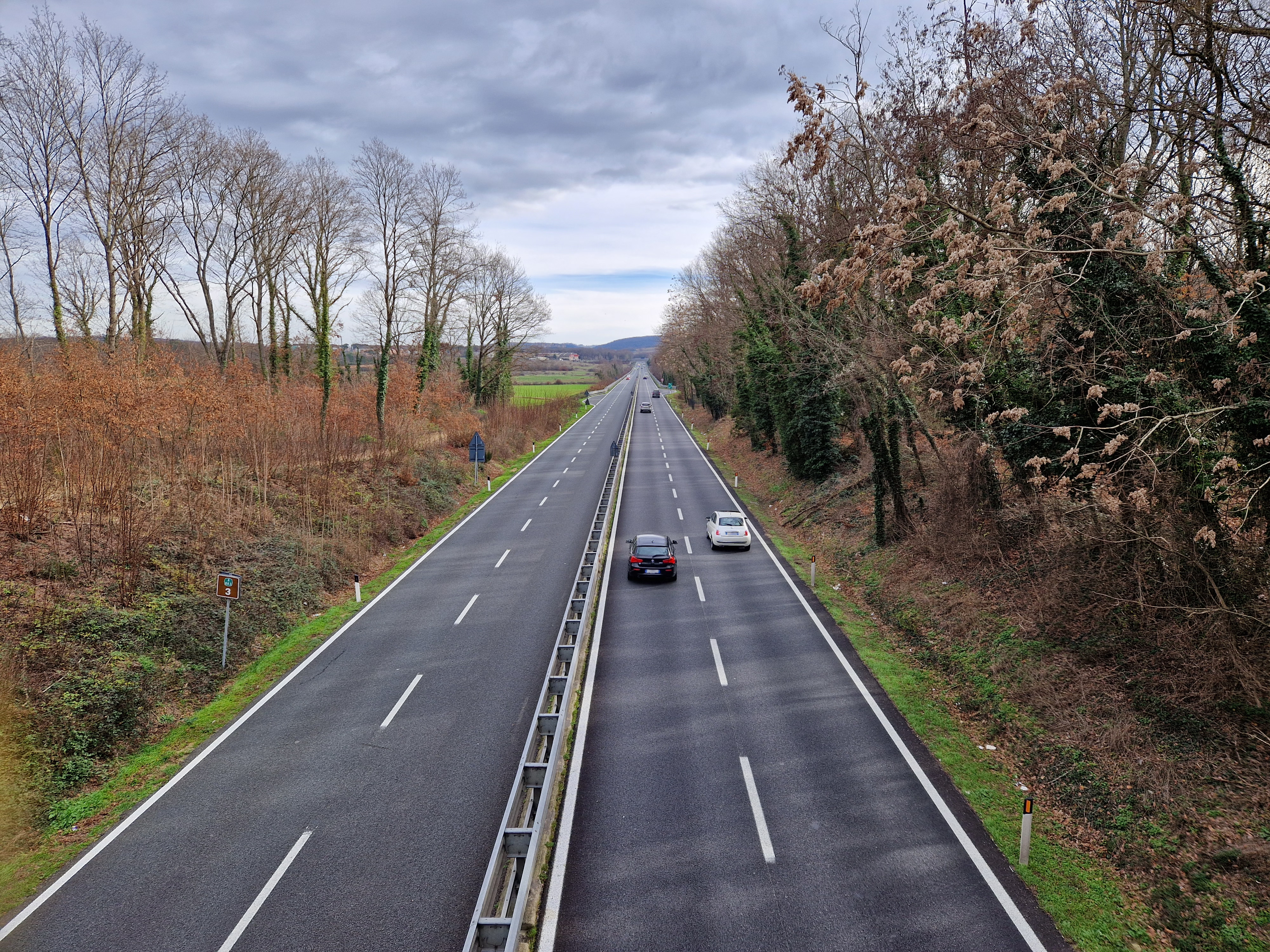
Raccordo autostradale 3 near Monteriggioni

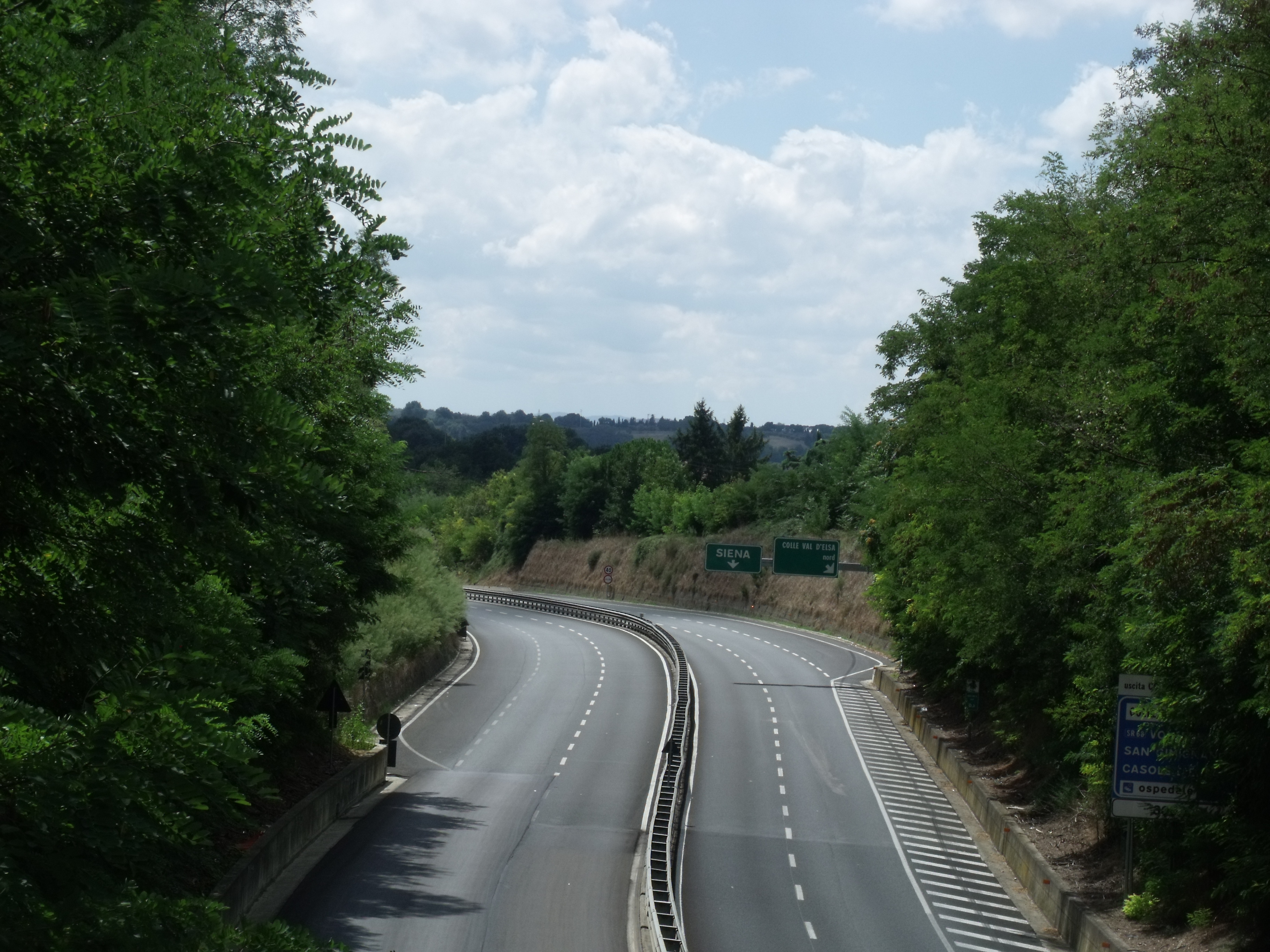
Raccordo autostradale 3 near Colle Val d'Elsa

Raccordo autostradale 3 (RA 3; "Motorway connection 3") or Raccordo autostradale Siena–Firenze ("Motorway connection Siena–Florence") is an autostrada (Italian for 'motorway') 56.3 kilometres (35.0 mi) long in Italy located in the region of Tuscany, managed by ANAS, which connects Florence to Siena. It is a branch of the Autostrada A1. The siding was opened in 1964.

== Route ==
RACCORDO AUTOSTRADALE 3 Raccordo autostradale Siena–Firenze
Exit	↓km↓	↑km↑	Province	European Route
Tangenziale Ovest di Siena	0.0 km (0 mi)	56.3 km (35.0 mi)	SI	--
Siena Nord	1.3 km (0.81 mi)	55.0 km (34.2 mi)	SI	--
Badesse	5.9 km (3.7 mi)	51.0 km (31.7 mi)	SI	--
Monteriggioni	10.4 km (6.5 mi)	46.0 km (28.6 mi)	SI	--
Colle Val d'Elsa Sud - Volterra	15.6 km (9.7 mi)	40.0 km (24.9 mi)	SI	--
Colle Val d'Elsa Nord	18.8 km (11.7 mi)	38.0 km (23.6 mi)	SI	--
Poggibonsi Sud	22.8 km (14.2 mi)	33.0 km (20.5 mi)	SI	--
Poggibonsi Nord - San Gimignano	25.1 km (15.6 mi)	31.0 km (19.3 mi)	SI	--
Rest area "Drove Est" (Note: Only in the direction of Florence.)	26.1 km (16.2 mi)	--	SI	--
Rest area "Drove Ovest" (Note: Only in the direction of Siena)	--	29.9 km (18.6 mi)	SI	--
San Donato in Poggio	35.6 km (22.1 mi)	21.0 km (13.0 mi)	FI	--
Tavarnelle Val di Pesa	40.5 km (25.2 mi)	16.0 km (9.9 mi)	FI	--
Rest area "San Casciano Est"	42.1 km (26.2 mi)	--	FI	--
Rest area "San Casciano Ovest"	--	13.0 km (8.1 mi)	FI	--
Bargino	44.3 km (27.5 mi)	12.0 km (7.5 mi)	FI	--
San Casciano Sud	--	9.0 km (5.6 mi) (Note: Heading north it is the last exit before the end of the motorway connection.)	FI	--
San Casciano Nord	50.2 km (31.2 mi)	-- (Note: There is no exit, only the entrance ramp towards the north is present.)	FI	--
Impruneta - Greve in Chianti	53.0 km (32.9 mi)	1.3 km (0.81 mi)	FI	--
Florence Scandicci; Milan-Naples; Florence Peretola Airport; Superstrada Firenze - Pisa - Livorno	56.3 km (35.0 mi)	0.0 km (0 mi)	FI	--

== See also ==
- Autostrade of Italy
- Roads in Italy
- Transport in Italy

=== Other Italian roads ===
- State highways (Italy)
- Regional road (Italy)
- Provincial road (Italy)
- Municipal road (Italy)
