= A16 (restaurant) =

- Interactive map of A16

Restaurant information
- Established: February 2004
- Owner: Shelley Lindgren
- Chef: Nicolette Manescalchi
- Food type: Italian
- Dress code: Casual
- Location: 2355 Chestnut Street, San Francisco, San Francisco, California, 94123, United States
- Coordinates: 37.799931°N 122.442081°W
- Website: www.a16sf.com

A16 is an Italian restaurant in California. There are two locations: the original location in San Francisco and a second location in Oakland. The restaurant's cuisine focuses on the Italian region of Campania. In 2014, the restaurant was named to the Top 100 Restaurants in San Francisco list by Michael Bauer of the San Francisco Chronicle.

== Description ==
The original A16 in San Francisco is located in the Marina District. The Oakland location is in the Rockridge neighborhood. The San Francisco restaurant's dining room is long and narrow. In the middle of the restaurant is an open kitchen. There is bar seating in the front and patio seating in the back.

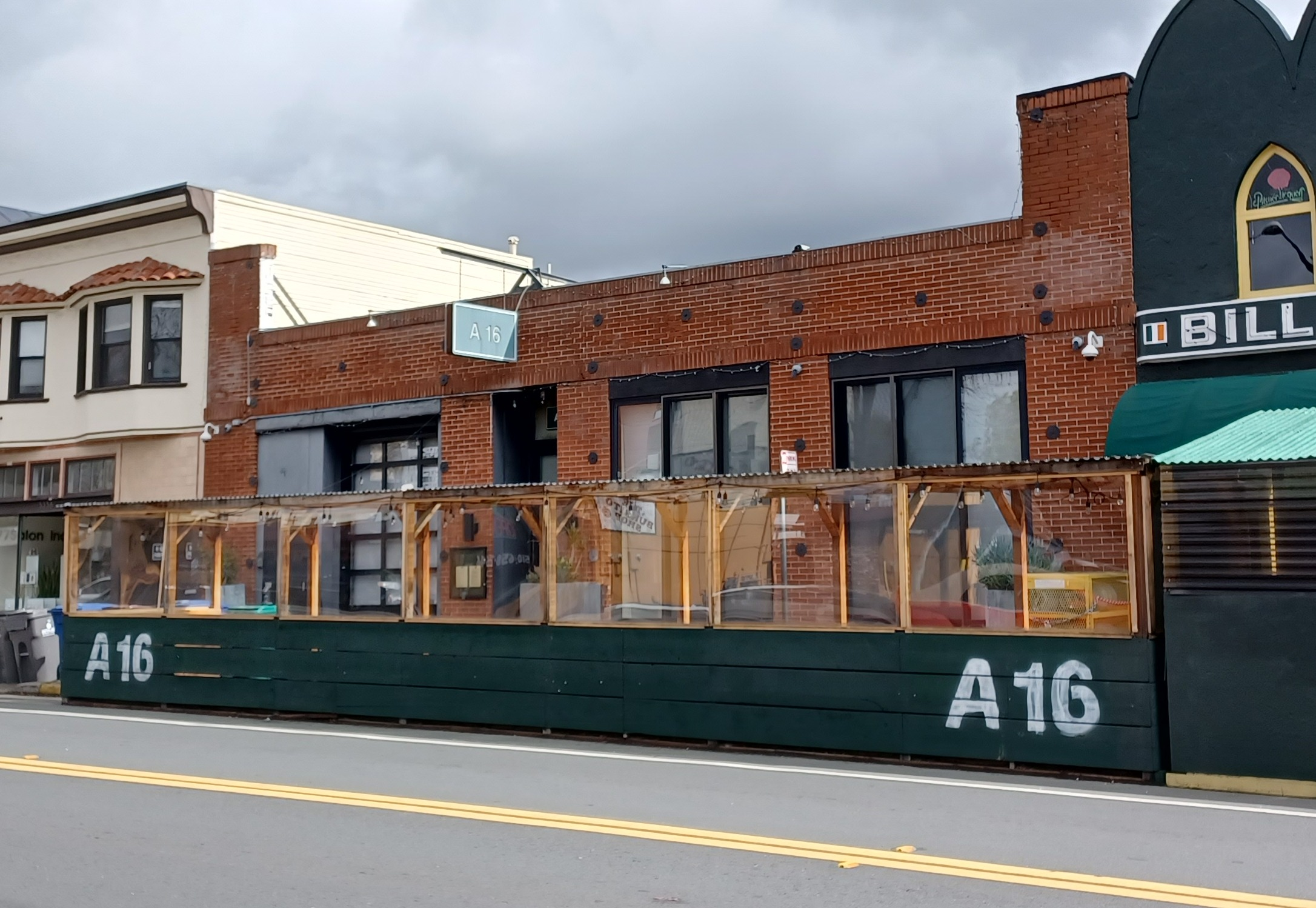
Oakland location

The Oakland location was designed by Cass Calder Smith of CCS Architecture. The space is described as "rustic-industrial". There entrance has large glass windows. The bar is made of thick marble. The exposed brick walls are an original component of the building architecture and wooden beams are visible on the ceiling. The ocean-themed artwork is by Kelly Tunstall. This location seats 85 and 125 including a private dining room.

=== Menu ===
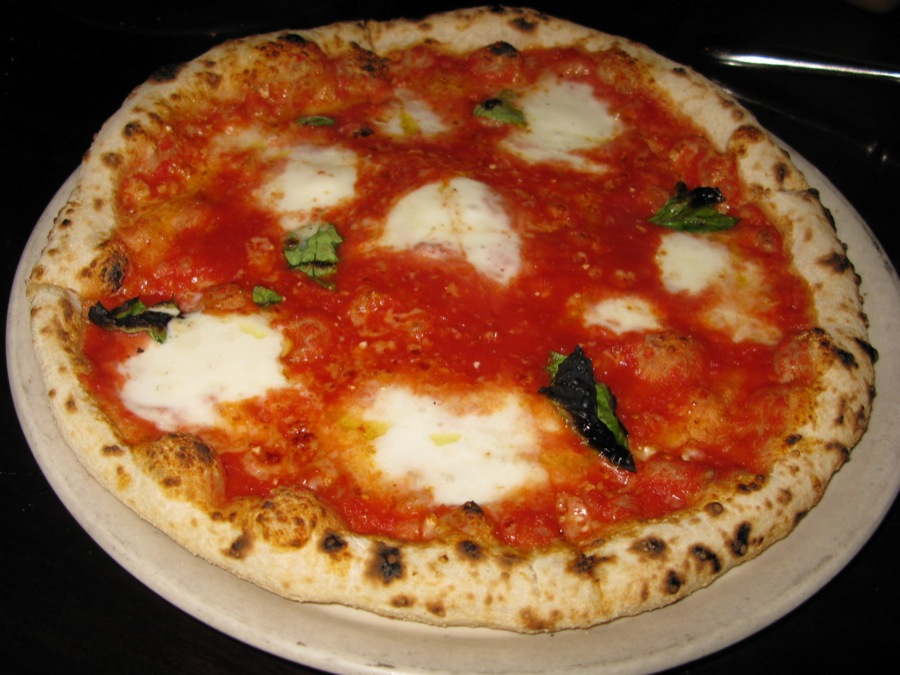
A Pizza Margherita at A16

A16's menu focuses on the cuisine of Campania, Italy. A16 is well known for its wood-fired pizza. Other dishes include braised octopus, fettuccine made with black pepper served with pig's trotters, sirloin steak and goat chop. Main courses come with a side dish of the diners choice, including cannellini beans or broccoli with Calabrian chilis and colatura di alici. For dessert, the restaurant serves a chocolate tart with sea salt. The menu offers many local ingredients from the San Francisco Bay Area, including coffee from Blue Bottle Coffee Company. The San Francisco location offers three-course lunch meals for $20. During lunch time, the kitchen staff can be seen processing meat for dinner service, including pig, rabbit, goat, chicken, and duck.

The wine list is maintained by owner and sommelier, Shelley Lindgren. It lists over 1,500 bottles of wine and focuses on Southern Italian wine.

== History ==
A16 was founded in February 2004 by Shelley Lindgren, a sommelier turned restaurateur, Victoria Libin, a tech lawyer, and Christophe Hille the founding chef. The restaurant is named after the Autostrada A16 in Italy. Christophe Hille was the founding chef, followed by Nate Appleman. Christophe Hille earned three stars by the San Francisco Chronicle in the opening review. Nate Appleman was awarded the James Beard Foundation Award for Rising Star Chef Award in 2009 and then quit A16 to move to New York. After he left, Liza Shaw became executive chef. A16 opened a restaurant in Tokyo in 2009 in partnership with Giraud Restaurants Limited at the Marunouchi Park Building. The menu was tailored to be financially cost effective (i.e. they removed fennel from the menu due to how expensive it was at the time) and the kitchen staff had to modify their habits to meet the kitchen provided by Mitsubishi, which included a gas pizza oven instead of a wood oven. In 2012, Christopher Thompson became Executive Chef. In 2013, Lindgren and Libin opened a second location in Oakland. This second location has a full liquor license, unlike the original. Thompson moved to the Rockridge location and left in 2014. That year, Rocky Maselli became executive chef at both locations. Rocky Masselli left in 2017 and Nicolette Manescalchi became the chef. Victoria Libin left the restaurants in 2014 and Shelley Lindgren became the sole managing partner.

The restaurant is popular as a lunch spot for food and wine industry workers, including Robert Finigan, who frequented the restaurant prior to his death.

== Reception ==
In 2014, Zagat rated A16 a 24. Michael Bauer of the San Francisco Chronicle has named A16 one of his favorite restaurants in San Francisco. In 2013 he gave it a three star review. Bauer has listed A16 in his annual Top 100 Restaurants in San Francisco list seven times. Over the years, Bauer has expressed concern about the quality of the original A16 suffering due to the opening of the new Oakland restaurant, and a frequent overturn of executive chefs. However, Bauer frequently reviews the restaurant and often states that the restaurant has not suffered despite these challenges and changes. Bauer and Zagat both noted that A16 is a loud restaurant. Zagat described it as having an "off putting noise."

The restaurant is well known for its wine list, which is maintained by owner Shelley Lindgren. The wine list was named one of the top three in the country by Lettie Teague in 2010. It was also nominated for a James Beard Award.
