= Autostrada A30 (Italy) =

Controlled-access highway in Italy

Autostrada A30

Route information
- Maintained by ANAS
- Length: 55.3 km (34.4 mi)
- Existed: 1976–present

Major junctions
- North end: Caserta
- A1 in Caserta; A16 in Nola; RA 2 in Avellino; A2 in Salerno
- South end: Salerno

Location
- Country: Italy
- Regions: Campania

Highway system
- Roads in Italy; Autostrade; State; Regional; Provincial; Municipal
| ← A 29 | → A 31 |

The Autostrada A30 is an autostrada (Italian for "motorway") 55 kilometres (34 mi) long in Italy located in the region of Campania which connects Caserta to Salerno.

The motorway connects motorway Autostrada A1 (Milan-Naples) to motorway Autostrada A2 (Salerno-Reggio Calabria), serving as a bypass of Naples and Salerno.

== Route ==
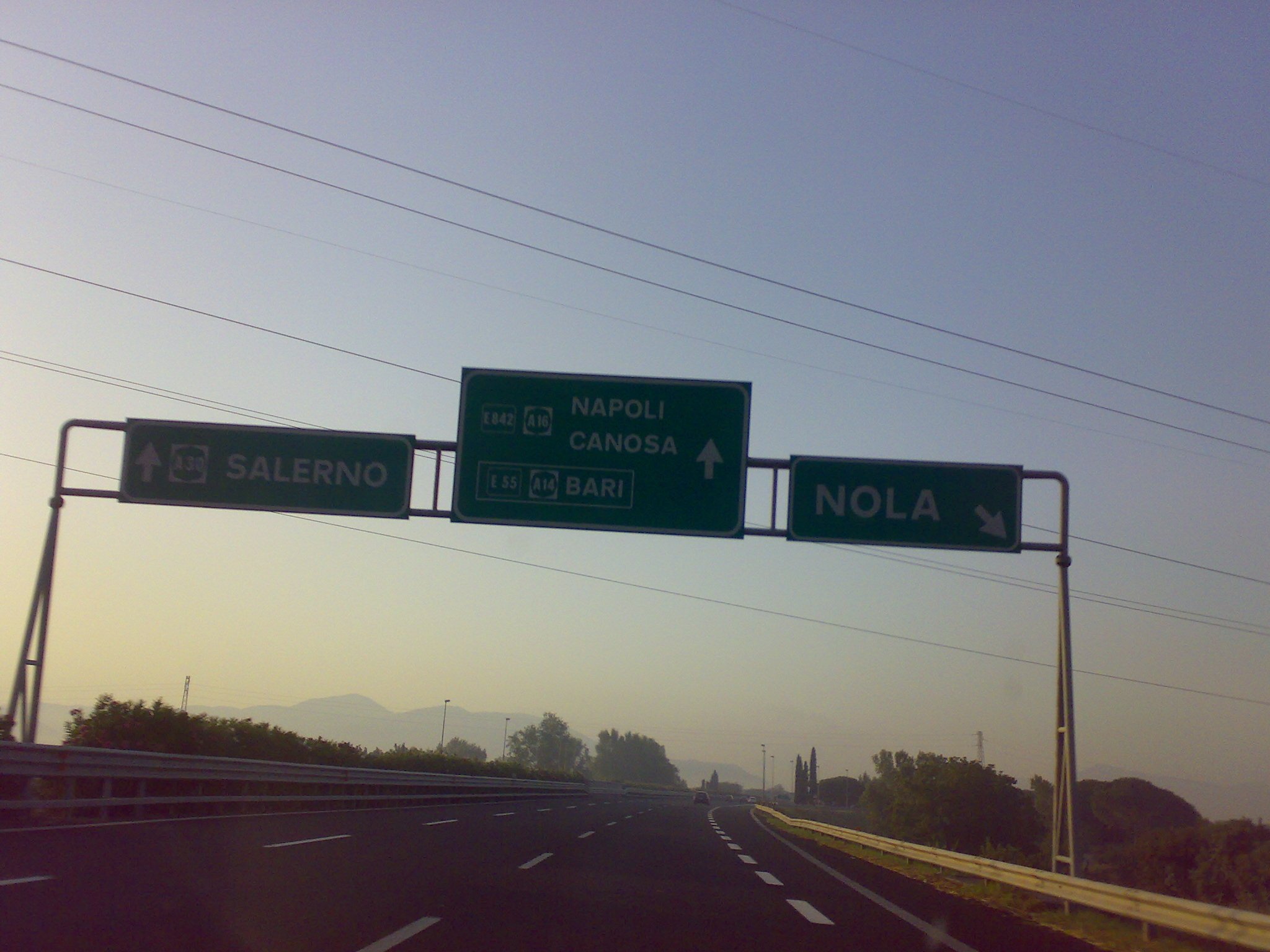
Autostrada A30 near Nola

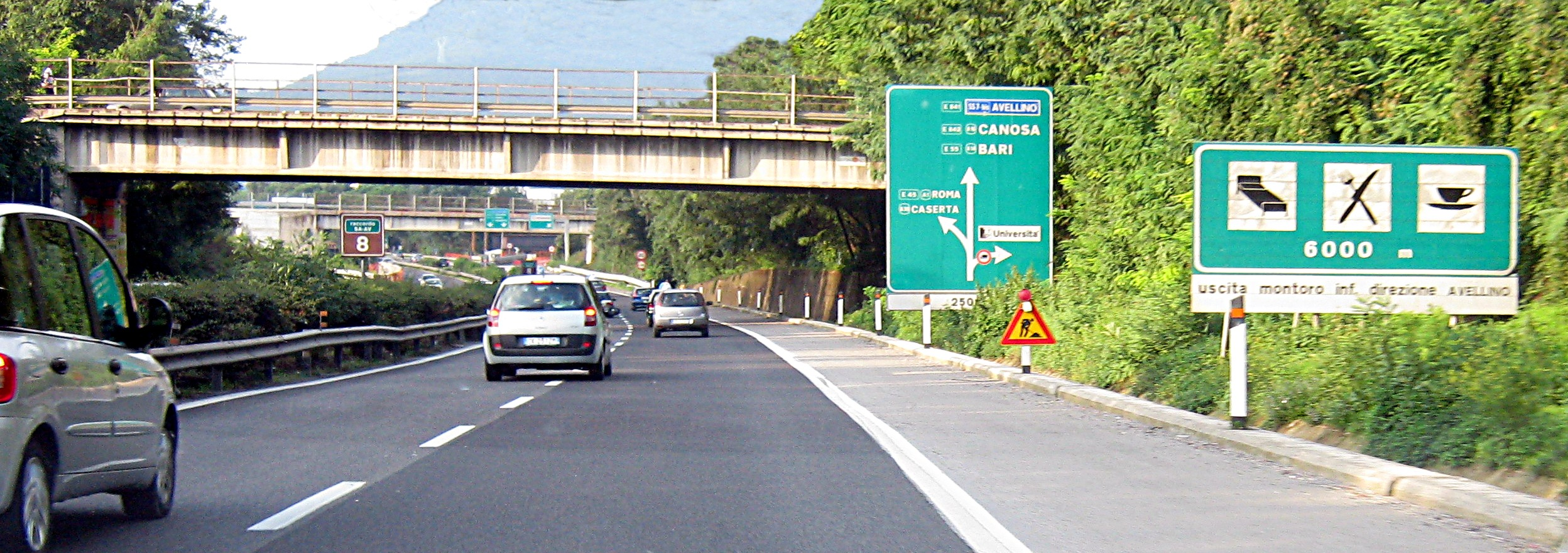
Autostrada A30 near Avellino

CASERTA - SALERNO
| Exit | ↓km↓ | ↑km↑ | Province | European Route |
| Milano - Napoli; Caserta - Marcianise - Roma | 0.0 km (0 mi) | 55.0 km (34.2 mi) | CE | -- |
| Maddaloni | 4.0 km (2.5 mi) | 51.0 km (31.7 mi) | CE | -- |
| Rest area "Tre Ponti" | 16.1 km (10.0 mi) | 38.4 km (23.9 mi) | NA | -- |
| Nola di Terra di Lavoro | 18.6 km (11.6 mi) | 35.9 km (22.3 mi) | NA | -- |
| Napoli - Canosa | 19.3 km (12.0 mi) | 34.4 km (21.4 mi) | NA | -- |
| Palma Campania del Vesuvio; San Gennaro Vesuviano - San Giuseppe Vesuviano | 30.2 km (18.8 mi) | 24.4 km (15.2 mi) | NA | -- |
| Rest area "Angioina" (Note: Only in the direction of Salerno.) | 33.1 km (20.6 mi) | - | NA | -- |
| Sarno; Striano - Poggiomarino | 35.9 km (22.3 mi) | 18.6 km (11.6 mi) | SA | -- |
| Nocera Inferiore - Pagani | 39.7 km (24.7 mi) | 15.1 km (9.4 mi) | SA | -- |
| Castel San Giorgio | 44.1 km (27.4 mi) | 10.5 km (6.5 mi) | SA | -- |
| Toll gate Salerno | 49.7 km (30.9 mi) | 5.3 km (3.3 mi) | SA | -- |
| Mercato San Severino | 51.8 km (32.2 mi) | 3.2 km (2.0 mi) | SA | -- |
| Avellino di Avellino; University of Salerno - Campus of Fisciano | 55.0 km (34.2 mi) | 0.0 km (0 mi) | SA | -- |
| Salerno - Reggio Calabria; Salerno - Reggio Calabria | 55.3 km (34.4 mi) | −0.3 km (−0.19 mi) | SA | -- |

== See also ==
- Autostrade of Italy
- Roads in Italy
- Transport in Italy

=== Other Italian roads ===
- State highways (Italy)
- Regional road (Italy)
- Provincial road (Italy)
- Municipal road (Italy)
