= European route E842 =

Road in trans-European E-road network

E842

Route information
- Length: 257 km (160 mi)

Major junctions
- From: Naples
- Avellino
- To: Canosa di Puglia

Location
- Countries: Italy

Highway system
- International E-road network; A Class; B Class

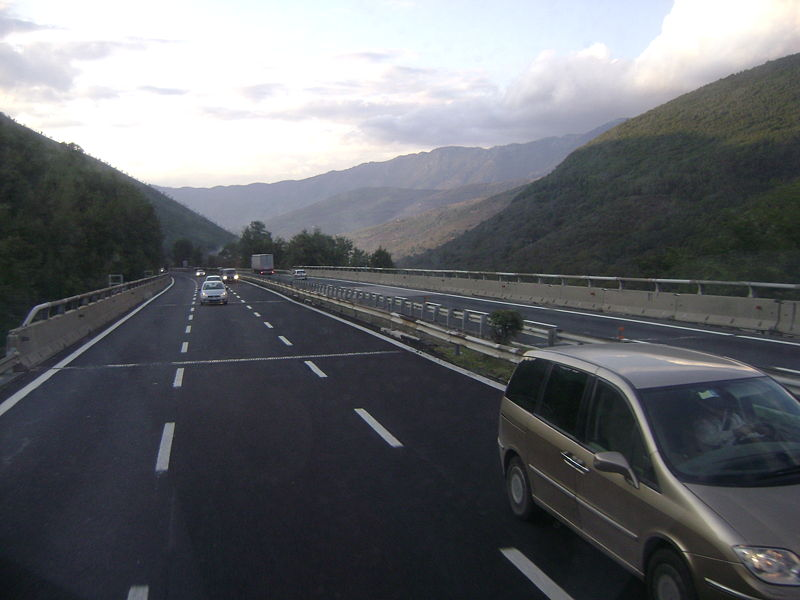
European route 842 near Baiano.

European route E 842 is a European B class road in Italy, connecting the cities Naples – Canosa di Puglia.

== Route ==
- Italy
  - E45 Naples
  - E841 Avellino
  - E55 Canosa di Puglia
