= Raccordo autostradale RA4 =

Controlled-access highway in Italy

Raccordo autostradale 4
- Motorway connection 4
- Raccordo autostradale di Reggio Calabria; Reggio Calabria motorway connection Tangenziale di Reggio Calabria; Reggio Calabria ring road

Route information
- Part of E90
- Maintained by ANAS
- Length: 5.5 km (3.4 mi)
- Existed: 1970–present

Major junctions
- Beltway around Reggio Calabria
- From: Reggio Calabria
- A2 in Reggio Calabria
- To: Reggio Calabria

Location
- Country: Italy
- Regions: Calabria

Highway system
- Roads in Italy; Autostrade; State; Regional; Provincial; Municipal
← RA 3	→ RA 5

Raccordo autostradale 4 (RA 4; "Motorway connection 4") or Raccordo autostradale di Reggio Calabria ("Reggio Calabria motorway connection") or Tangenziale di Reggio Calabria ("Reggio Calabria ring road") is an autostrada (Italian for "motorway") 5.5 kilometres (3.4 mi) long in Italy located in the region of Calabria that connects the Autostrada A2 with the Strada statale 106 Jonica through the city of Reggio Calabria. The motorway junction also constitutes the central section of the so-called "Reggio Calabria ring road". It is a part of the E90 European route.

== Route ==
RACCORDO AUTOSTRADALE 4 Raccordo autostradale di Reggio Calabria; Tangenziale di Reggio Calabria
Exit	↓km↓	↑km↑	Province	European Route
Diramazione Reggio Calabria Salerno	0.0 km (0 mi)	5.5 km (3.4 mi)	RC	E90
Reggio Calabria via Lia	0.3 km (0.19 mi)	5.2 km (3.2 mi)	RC	E90
Reggio Calabria via Cardinale Portanova – via Petrara; Madonna della Consolazione Hospital	1.5 km (0.93 mi)	4.0 km (2.5 mi)	RC	E90
Reggio Calabria Spirito Santo – Cannavò	2.9 km (1.8 mi)	2.6 km (1.6 mi)	RC	E90
Reggio Calabria Calopinace; Reggio di Calabria Centrale railway station Oreste Granillo Stadium	3.3 km (2.1 mi)	2.2 km (1.4 mi)	RC	E90
Reggio Calabria Modena – San Sperato	4.4 km (2.7 mi)	1.1 km (0.68 mi)	RC	E90
Reggio Calabria Arangea – Gallina; Reggio Calabria Airport	5.3 km (3.3 mi)	0.2 km (0.12 mi)	RC	E90
Jonica – Taranto	5.5 km (3.4 mi)	0.0 km (0 mi)	RC	E90

== See also ==
- Autostrade of Italy
- Roads in Italy
- Transport in Italy

=== Other Italian roads ===
- State highways (Italy)
- Regional road (Italy)
- Provincial road (Italy)
- Municipal road (Italy)
