= European route E847 =

Road in trans-European E-road network

E847

Route information
- Length: 159 km (99 mi)

Major junctions
- From: Sicignano degli Alburni
- To: Bernalda

Location
- Countries: Italy

Highway system
- International E-road network; A Class; B Class

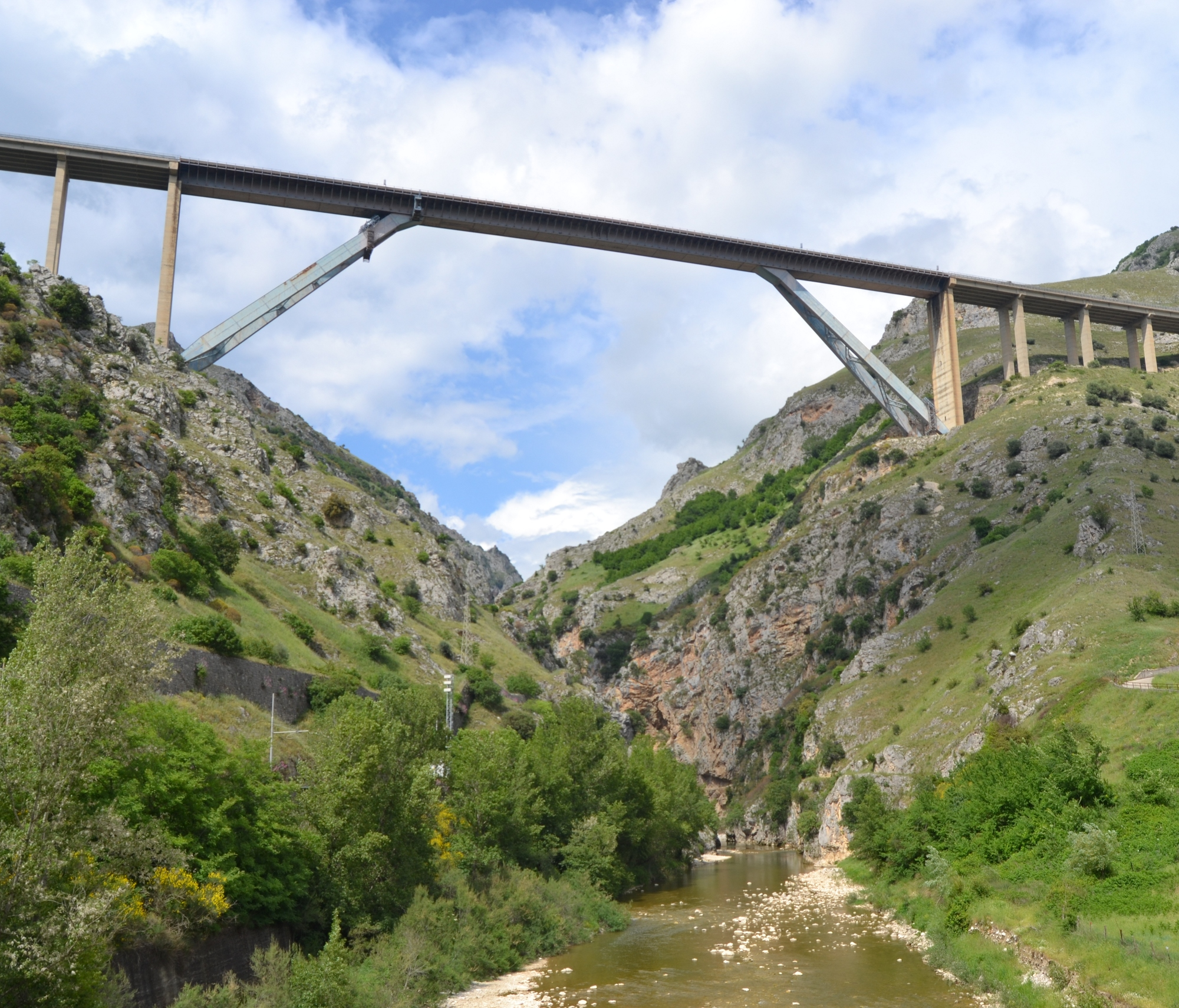
European route 847 near Romagnano al Monte.

European route E 847 is a European B class road in Italy, connecting the cities Sicignano degli Alburni – Bernalda.

== Route ==
- Italy
  - E45 Sicignano degli Alburni
  - E90 Bernalda
