= Baiano, Campania =

Baiano
- Comune
- Comune di Baiano
- Coat of arms

- Location within Italy Location within Campania
- Coordinates: 40°57′13″N 14°37′0″E
- Country: Italy
- Region: Campania
- Province: Province of Avellino (AV)

Government
  - Mayor: Vincenzo Cavaccini

Area
  - Total: 12.25 km^{2} (4.73 sq mi)
- Elevation: 196 m (643 ft)

Population (2007)
  - Total: 4,723
  - Density: 385.6/km^{2} (998.6/sq mi)
- Demonym: Baianesi
- Time zone: UTC+1 (CET)
  - Summer (DST): UTC+2 (CEST)
- Postal code: 83022
- Dialing code: 081
- Patron saint: Saint Stephen
- Saint day: 3 August
- Website: Official website

Baiano is a commune, population 4,743, in the Province of Avellino in the Italian region Campania, located in the Agro Nolano.

It borders the communes of Avella, Mugnano del Cardinale, Sirignano, Sperone and Visciano. The municipality of Baiano is a mountainous municipality in Irpinia and covers an area of about 12.25 km2 in the Partenio Regional Park.

== History ==
The name may derive from a Roman-era property, praedium Badianum ("Badio estate") or praedium Vallejanum, linked to the nearby town of Abella (now Avella). In Roman times the territory was assigned to the Galeria tribe.

It was later part of the Lombard duchy of Benevento and the Norman principality of Salerno and is recorded in 1129 as a casale of Avella, while in 1210 it was taxed separately. Later it was a fief of the Orsini family and then part of the barony of Avella. At the end of the 17th century it recovered its autonomy.

In 1715 it became an autonomous municipality with the name of Bajano (a name it kept until the early 20th century) and was formerly part of the province of Terra di Lavoro, mandamento di Bajano (of which Avella, Mugnano del Cardinale, Quadrelle, Sirignano and Sperone were also part). With the unification of Italy it was assigned to the province of Avellino.

Until 1923 (the date of the abolition of the mandamento as an administrative subdivision) it was chief town of the mandamento of the same name and was the seat of the magistrate's court, the mandala prison and other administrative offices. Today it is home to the Carabinieri barracks, the Guardia di Finanza barracks and one of the State Forestry Corps.

== Monuments and Historical Places ==
- Vesuni Quarter (historic center)
- Church of the Holy Cross
- Church of the Holy Apostles
- Church of St. Stephen Protomartyr, restored after damage from earthquakes in 1980 and 1981 (St. Stephen's Church in particular suffered roof damage, with the loss of frescoes, now replaced)
- Hermitage of Jesus and Mary
- Vallone Sorroncello (650 m a.s.l.)
