= European route E841 =

Road in trans-European E-road network

E841

Route information
- Length: 38 km (24 mi)

Major junctions
- From: Avellino
- To: Salerno

Location
- Countries: Italy

Highway system
- International E-road network; A Class; B Class

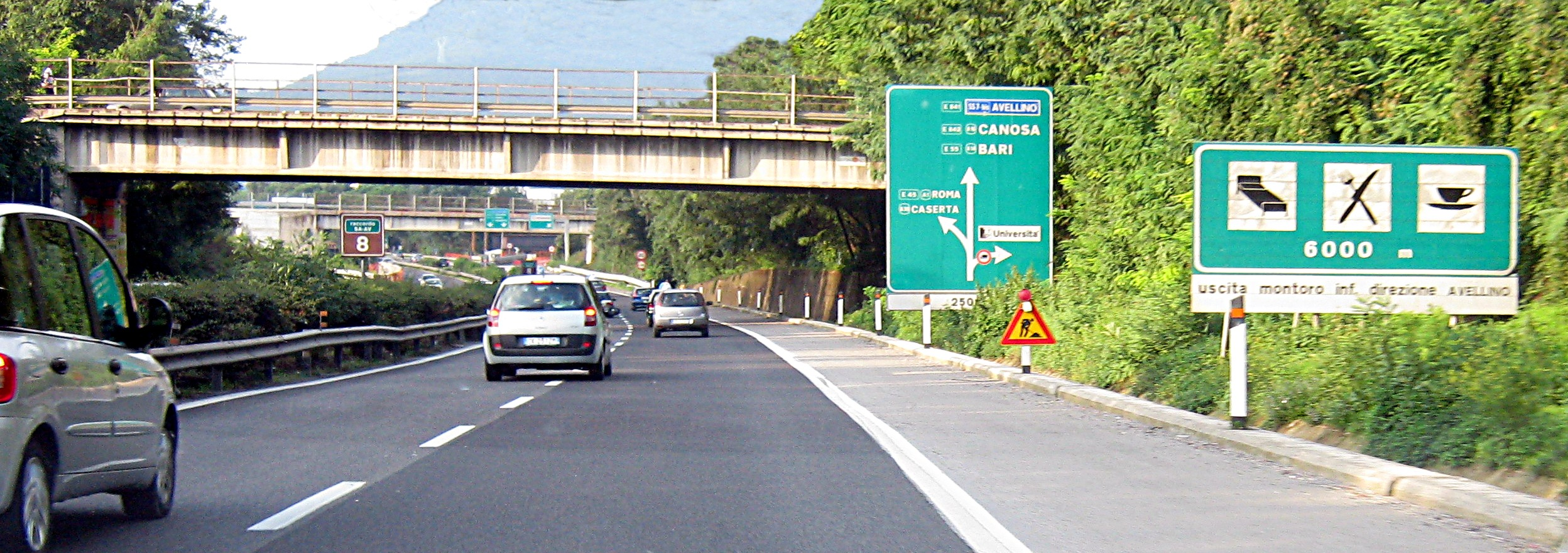
European route 841 near Avellino.

European route E 841 is a European B class road in Italy, connecting the cities Avellino – Salerno.

== Route ==
- Italy
  - E842 Avellino
  - E45 Salerno
