= Port of Reggio =

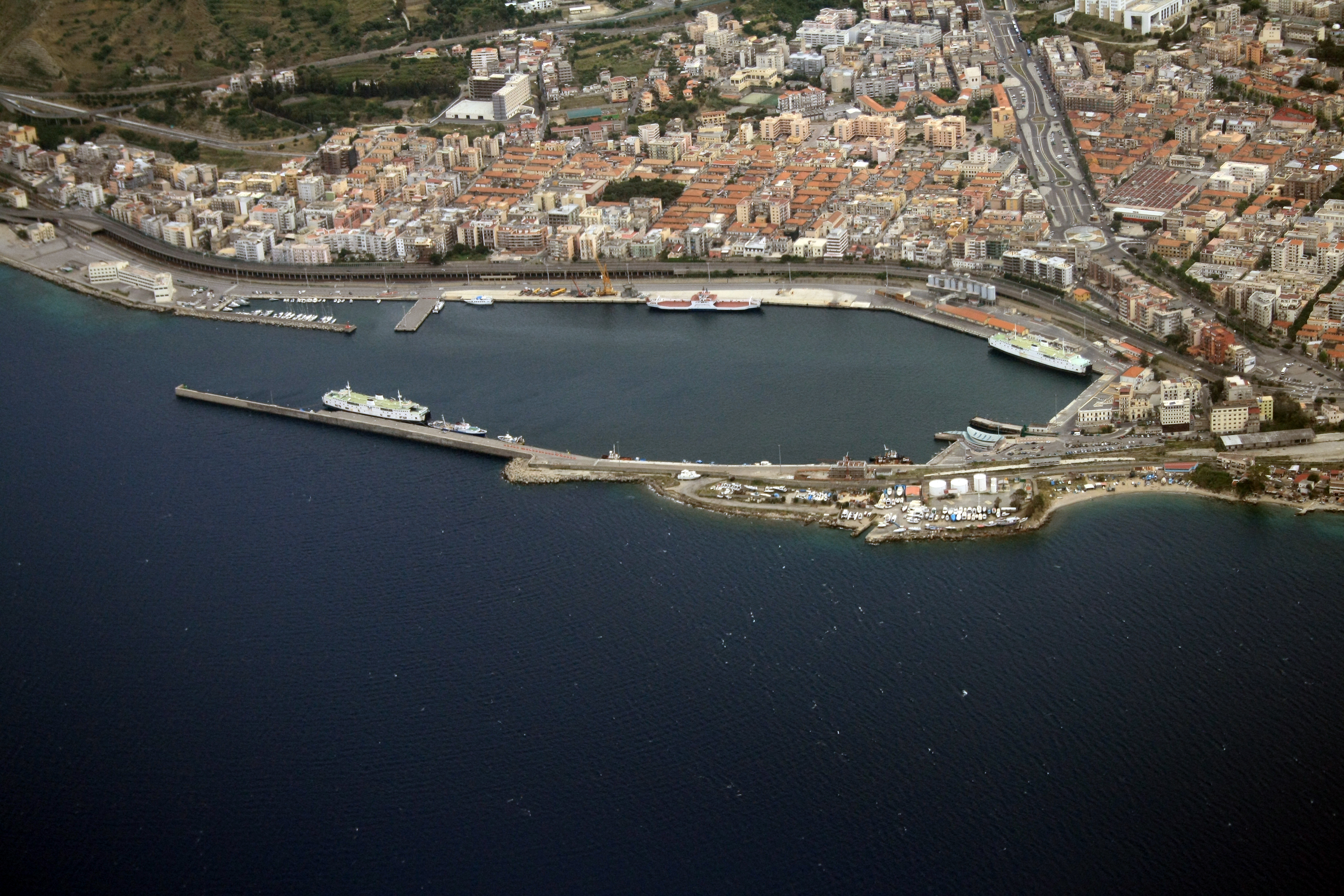
- Harbour
- Interactive map of Port of Reggio

Location
- Country: Italy
- Location: Reggio Calabria
- Coordinates: 38°07′23″N 15°39′00″E

Details
- Type of harbour: Natural/Artificial
- Size of harbour: 100,000 sq m

The Port of Reggio is a seaport in the Mediterranean Sea serving the Italian city of Reggio Calabria.

The position of the ancient Ausonian-Italic and Greek port is unknown. At that time, the port was located in the southern part of the Reggio coast. During Roman times, the port, called Columna Rhegina was located in the northern part of the Reggio coast, near the Strait of Messina between Sicily and Calabria. The present-day port, enlarged after 1908 earthquake, just takes up the western part of the Santa Caterina neighbourhood, near the city centre.

The port connects Reggio and its surroundings to Messina, Catania, Aeolian Islands, Taormina and Malta.

The port of Reggio, which opens onto the eastern shore of the Strait, consists of an artificial basin protected by the long Banchina di Ponente. The city of Reggio overlooks the port with the Santa Caterina district.

On the inner side is the eastern quay with the fish market, the Margottini quay, and, further south, the inner breakwater for pleasure boats. One quay is dedicated to fishing.

The entrance mouth is 110 m wide, while the docks measure approximately 2.5 km. The seabed is on average 7.50 m deep, while the total surface area of the basin occupies100,000 m² and the tide level difference is 60 cm.

The maritime and air health offices, as well as the veterinary office, are located at the port. From the western pier, you can enjoy a wide and evocative panorama of the city of Reggio.
