= Autostrada A54 =

Controlled-access highway in Italy

Autostrada A54
- Tangenziale Ovest di Pavia; Pavia west ring road

Route information
- Maintained by Milano Serravalle - Milano Tangenziali
- Length: 8.4 km (5.2 mi)
- Existed: 1994–present

Major junctions
- Beltway around Pavia
- South end: San Martino Siccomario
- A53 in Pavia
- North end: Pavia

Location
- Country: Italy
- Regions: Lombardy

Highway system
- Roads in Italy; Autostrade; State; Regional; Provincial; Municipal
← A 53	→ A 55

Autostrada A54 or Tangenziale Ovest di Pavia ("Pavia west ring road") is an autostrada (Italian for "motorway") 8.4 kilometres (5.2 mi) long in Italy located in the region of Lombardy and tangent to the city of Pavia in its western part, managed by Milano Serravalle – Milano Tangenziali.

== Route ==
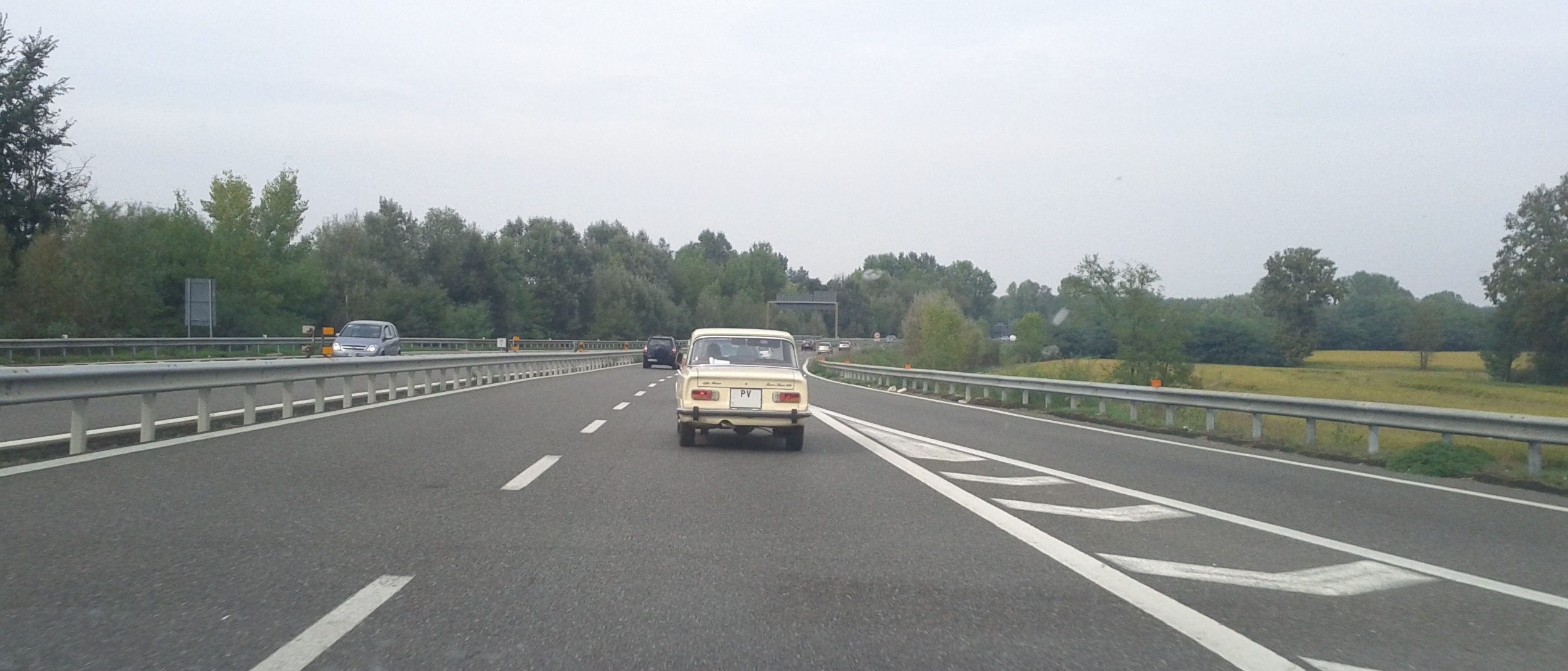
Autostrada A54 near San Martino Siccomario

TANGENZIALE OVEST DI PAVIA; Autostrada A54
Exit	↓km↓	↑km↑	Province	European Route
dei Giovi - Genova	0.0 km (0 mi)	8.4 km (5.2 mi)	PV	--
Pavia Sud	0.4 km (0.25 mi)	8.0 km (5.0 mi)	PV	--
San Martino Siccomario - Pavia Borgo Ticino	1.8 km (1.1 mi)	6.6 km (4.1 mi)	PV	--
Raccordo Bereguardo-Pavia; Milan - Genoa	5.3 km (3.3 mi)	3.1 km (1.9 mi)	PV	--
Pavia Ovest; Bereguardo-Abbiategrasso; Pavia railway station	5.9 km (3.7 mi)	2.5 km (1.6 mi)	PV	--
Pavia; Policlinico San Matteo; University of Pavia	6.1 km (3.8 mi)	2.3 km (1.4 mi)	PV	--
Pavia Via Brambilla; Stadio Pietro Fortunati	7.0 km (4.3 mi)	1.4 km (0.87 mi)	PV	--
Bronese; Piacenza	7.4 km (4.6 mi)	1.0 km (0.62 mi)	PV	--
dei Giovi - Milan	8.4 km (5.2 mi)	0.0 km (0 mi)	PV	--

== See also ==
- Autostrade of Italy
- Roads in Italy
- Transport in Italy

=== Other Italian roads ===
- State highways (Italy)
- Regional road (Italy)
- Provincial road (Italy)
- Municipal road (Italy)
