= Autostrada del Brennero =

Autostrada del Brennero may refer to:

- Autostrada A22 (Italy)
- Brenner Autobahn, Austria
- Autostrada del Brennero (company), operator of A22 in Italy
