= A4 Holding =

- Native name: A4 Holding S.p.A.
- Formerly: Serenissima Group
- Type: subsidiary of a listed company
- Founded: June 1952
- Headquarters: Verona, Italy
- Key people: Attilio Schneck (chairman); Giulio Burchi (CEO); Flavio Tosi (director); Maurizio Pagani (general director)
- Revenue: ▼€559,241,763 (2015)
- Operating income: ▼€79,241,040 (2015)
- Net income: ▲€42,451,005 (2015)
- Total assets: ▲€1,749,109,885 (2015)
- Total equity: ▲€648,443,861 (2015)
- Owner: Abertis (51.3964%)
- Parent: Abertis
- Subsidiaries: Autostrada Brescia Verona Vicenza Padova; Serenissima Partecipazioni; Serenissima Mobilità; Serenissima Costruzioni
- Website: a4holding.it
- Footnotes in consolidated basis

A4 Holding S.p.A. known as Gruppo A4 Holding (previously as Serenissima Group), is an Italian holding company based in Verona, Veneto region. The company owned Autostrada Brescia Verona Vicenza Padova (100%), the operator of Brescia–Padua section of Autostrada A4 and Autostrada A31 (Rovigo via Vicenza to Piovene Rocchette), as well as an equity interests in Autostrada del Brennero, the operator of Autostrada A22 (Modena to Brenner Pass; 4.2327% stake via Serenissima Partecipazioni which A4 Holding owned 99.999% stake) and Autostrade Lombarde, the parent company of the operator of Autostrada A35 (Brescia to Milan; 4.90% stake via Autostrada Brescia–Padova).

== History ==
Autostrada Brescia Verona Vicenza Padova (P.IVA 00212330237; Verona CCIAA: 57409/1952) was the operator of Brescia–Padua section of Autostrada A4 and Autostrada A31. On 6 December 2011, the company was renamed to A4 Holding S.p.A., with a new subsidiary (P.IVA 03614140238; Verona CCIAA: 0350682) owned the concession to operate the toll road, effectively spin off the function of holding company from the operator.

The concession of Autostrada A31 was originally expired on 30 June 2013, which was agreed in 1999, after that the company started to construct the extension from Vicenza to Rovigo in the south in 2005. The concession was challenged by the European Commission in 2004. The European Court of Justice ruled that Italy failed to fulfill the obligations under European Council Directive 93/37/EEC. On 3 October 2006 Italian Decree-Law 262/2006 was announced, which amended the power of ANAS (both operator and regulator of Italian toll roads) in order to comply with EU rule. On 12 October European Commission sent a formal notice (applying Article 258 of TFEU) to Italy regarding the issue (infringement procedure N° 2006/4378). In July 2007 the concession was extended to 31 December 2026, applying Decree-Law 262/2006. The concession was confirmed by Decree-Law 59/2008 and Law 101/2008, despite the status of the infringement procedure. On 8 October 2009 European Council closed the case.

== Shareholders ==
The company was a subsidiary of a consortium led by Intesa Sanpaolo. The bank had a controlling voting rights (65.92%) in Re.Consult Infrastrutture, the direct parent company of A4 Holding (R.C.I., via three companies Investire nelle Infrastrutture (IN.FRA), Compagnia Italiana Finanziaria (CIF) and Iniziative Logistiche, the latter two Intesa Sanpaolo owned 63.78% stake and 60.02% stake respectively); R.C.I. owned 44.8530% stake in A4 Holding as at 31 December 2014, (which received about 5% shares from CIF circa 2013) Intesa had an additional 6.5433% stake in A4 Holding, held directly by banking subsidiary Equiter (as at 31 December 2014, a wholly owned subsidiary of Intesa). Astaldi was the minority shareholders of R.C.I. (31.85% via wholly owned subsidiary Astaldi Concessioni), which the construction company merged its subsidiary A.I.2 S.r.l. (the holder of the equity interests in A4 Holding) into R.C.I. on 1 January 2014. Infrastrutture CIS (InfraCIS) was a minority owner of CIF (8.33%) and Iniziative Logistiche (8.97%), which in turn Primo Fondo Italiano per le Infrastrutture and Cassa del Trentino were the minority owners of InfraCIS. The last two shareholders of CIF were 2G Investimenti (Giuliano and Guglielmo Tabacchi) and Esperia Servizi Fiduciari (subsidiary of Banca Esperia). Intesa Sanpaolo acquired the shares of R.C.I., CIF and Iniziative Logistiche in year 2010 due to the collapse of the business empire of Mario Rino Gambari, which the shares were collaterals to the bank. The shares of CIF and Iniziative Logistiche held by 2G Investimenti were also pledged to Intesa Sanpaolo in year 2011. Lastly, Infragruppo, a company that A4 Holding had a significant stake (49.01%), the bank also had a 21.71% stake as at 31 December 2009, as well as had a significant loan to the company. In 2011 Infragruppo was merged into Serenissima Partecipazioni, which A4 Holding increased it stake to 99.999%, the minority interests and the loan previously held by bank was repaid via the capital increase of A4 Holding, by the bank and other shareholders.

In 2016 Abertis announced that the company would buy the stake held by Old Equiter (ex-Equiter, a shareholder of [new] Equiter; 6.5433% stake) and Re.Consult Infrastrutture (44.8530%) for €594 million.

The second largest shareholder of A4 Holding was Società delle Autostrade Serenissima (8.3732% as at 31 December 2014, increased from 1.6874000% in May 2011), the ex-operator of Padua–Venice section of Autostrada A4 until 2009. A4 Holding had a cross ownership of 14.45% stake in Società delle Autostrade Serenissima as at 31 December 2014, (decreased from 19.05% in December 2011) which was sold completely as in 2016. Mantovani–FIP Group (Serenissima Holding) had a significant voting rights of 35.28% in Società delle Autostrade Serenissima (as at 2016), as well as a minority interests (0.1617%) in A4 Holding via Impresa di Costruzioni Ing. E. Mantovani, an Italian construction company.

Unione Fiduciaria was the third largest shareholders, which acquired the entire 4.6671% stake from Milano Serravalle – Milano Tangenziali on 25 July 2014. The bank would eventually transferred the entire stake to Società delle Autostrade Serenissima in 2019 in installments.

As of 31 December 2014

- private investors (67.7728%)
1. a consortium led by Intesa Sanpaolo (51.3964%)
  1. Re.Consult Infrastrutture (44.8530%)
  2. Old Equiter (6.5433%)
2. Società delle Autostrade Serenissima (8.3732%)
3. Unione Fiduciaria (4.6671%)
4. Banco Popolare (2.7071%)
5. Banca Popolare di Vicenza (0.2043%)
6. Impresa di Costruzioni Ing. E. Mantovani (0.1617%)
7. Fondazione Cariverona (0.1425%)
8. Condotte d'Acqua (0.1204%)
- Chamber of Commerce, Industry, Agriculture and Artisanship (8.6994%)
1. Brescia Chamber of Commerce (1.5732%)
2. Bergamo Chamber of Commerce (1.5472%)
3. Verona Chamber of Commerce (1.5042%)
4. Padua Chamber of Commerce (1.3500%)
5. Venice Chamber of Commerce (1.1794%)
6. Vicenza Chamber of Commerce (1.0701%)
7. Milan Chamber of Commerce (0.4753%)
  1. direct (0.0001%)
  2. Holding di Partecipazioni Parcam (0.4752%)
- Local governments (23.5278%)
1. Province of Vicenza (7.4373%)
2. Comune of Verona (4.6480%)
3. Province of Brescia (4.5096%)
4. Province of Verona (4.2308%)
5. Province of Bergamo (2.2976%)
6. Comune of Vicenza (0.2426%)
7. Province of Venice (0.0809%)
8. Comune of Bergamo (0.0809%)
9. Province of Milan (0.0001%)
