= Panzano =

Panzano is the name of five frazioni (hamlets) of the following Italian and Spanish communes:

- Campogalliano
- Castelfranco Emilia
- Greve in Chianti
- Monfalcone
- Huesca
