= Infrastrutture CIS =

- Native name: Infrastrutture CIS S.p.A.
- Type: private Società per Azioni
- Industry: Financial services
- Founded: 2007
- Headquarters: Villafranca di Verona, Italy
- Services: holding company of toll road operators
- Net income: €1,077,271 (2014)
- Total equity: €97,567,930 (2014)
- Owner: CIS (38.72%); F2i First Fund (26.31%); Cassa del Trentino (19.89%); Impresa Pizzarotti (13.76%); others (1.32%)
- Website: Official website

Infrastrutture CIS (InfraCIS) is an Italian holding company that associated with Compagnia Investimenti Sviluppo (CIS Group; literally Company [for] Investment [in] Development), which had 38.72% stake. Fondo Italiano per le Infrastrutture also had a minority interests of 26% in InfraCIS.

Compagnia Investimenti Sviluppo itself consist of 154 shareholders, such as Veneto Sviluppo (3.15% stake in 2013). It was reported that CIS would be liquidate as part of reconstruction. While Milano Finanza reported that InfraCIS will be liquidated or just selling the road assets instead.

The company directly or indirectly had equity interests in the operator of Autostrada A15 and A22 and Brescia to Padua and Venice to Trieste section of Autostrada A4 (2.21% indirectly).

The company also owned a minority interests in Iniziative Logistiche and Compagnia Italiana Finanziaria, subsidiaries of Intesa Sanpaolo.

== Equity interests ==
- Autostrada del Brennero (7.8275%)
- Iniziative Logistiche (8.97%)
- Compagnia Italiana Finanziaria (8.33%)
  - Re.Consult Infrastrutture (38.52% via CIF; 19.26% via Iniziative Logistiche)
    - A4 Holding (44.85%)
      - Autostrada Brescia Verona Vicenza Padova (100%)
        - Serenissima Partecipazioni (99.999%)
          - Autostrada del Brennero (4.2327%)
- GIRPA S.p.A. (in liquidation; 10% stake)
- Autovie Venete (4.29%)
- Autocamionale della Cisa (0.357%)
