= Autostrada A53 (Italy) =

Controlled-access highway in Italy

Autostrada A53
- Raccordo Autostradale 7 RA7 motorway junction

Route information
- Maintained by Milano Serravalle - Milano Tangenziali
- Length: 9.1 km (5.7 mi)
- Existed: 1960–present

Major junctions
- North end: Bereguardo
- A7 in Bereguardo; A54 in Pavia
- South end: Pavia

Location
- Country: Italy
- Regions: Lombardy

Highway system
- Roads in Italy; Autostrade; State; Regional; Provincial; Municipal
← A 52	→ A 54

The Autostrada A53 or Raccordo autostradale RA7 ("RA7 motorway junction") is an autostrada (Italian for "motorway") 9.1 kilometres (5.7 mi) long in Italy located in the region of Lombardy which connects Bereguardo and Autostrada A7 to Pavia and its bypass Autostrada A54. The Autostrada A53 is managed by Milano Serravalle - Milano Tangenziali.

== Route ==
BEREGUARDO - PAVIA; Raccordo autostradale RA7
Exit	↓km↓	↑km↑	Province	European Route
Milano - Genova	0.0 km (0 mi)	9.1 km (5.7 mi)	PV	--
Toll gate Bereguardo	0.1 km (0.062 mi)	9.0 km (5.6 mi)	PV	--
Bereguardo	0.6 km (0.37 mi)	8.5 km (5.3 mi)	PV	--
Cascina Carpana	2.0 km (1.2 mi)	7.1 km (4.4 mi)	PV	--
Casottole	2.8 km (1.7 mi)	6.3 km (3.9 mi)	PV	--
Torre d'Isola	4.1 km (2.5 mi)	5.0 km (3.1 mi)	PV	--
Villaggio dei Pioppi	4.8 km (3.0 mi)	5.3 km (3.3 mi)	PV	--
Massaua	6.5 km (4.0 mi)	2.6 km (1.6 mi)	PV	--
Pavia Via Riviera	8.5 km (5.3 mi)	0.6 km (0.37 mi)	PV	--
Tangenziale di Pavia	9.1 km (5.7 mi)	0.0 km (0 mi)	PV	--

== See also ==
- Autostrade of Italy
- Roads in Italy
- Transport in Italy

=== Other Italian roads ===
- State highways (Italy)
- Regional road (Italy)
- Provincial road (Italy)
- Municipal road (Italy)
