= Autostrade Lombarde =

Italian holding company

- location of Autostrada A35
- Native name: Autostrade Lombarde S.p.A.
- Company type: private Società per Azioni
- Industry: Financial services
- Headquarters: 2/4 via Somalia, Brescia, Italy
- Key people: Francesco Bettoni (president); Duilio Allegrini (general manager)
- Services: holding company of toll road operator
- Revenue: ▼€70,898,801 (2014)
- Operating income: ▼€45,498,213 (2014)
- Net income: ▼ (€26,033,377) (2014)
- Total assets: ▲€1,907,427,946 (2014)
- Total equity: ▼€424,401,424 (2014)
- Owner: Intesa Sanpaolo (42.4461%)
- Footnotes / references in consolidated balance sheets

Autostrade Lombarde is an Italian holding company that owned a majority stake (78.9752%) in Società di Progetto Brebemi S.p.A., the operator of Autostrada A35 (Brescia–Bergamo–Milan, although the toll road did not go through Bergamo city but the province). The company also owned 27.958% stake in Autostrade Bergamasche (ex-Interconnessione Pedemontana-Brebemi), a company that own the concession to connect Autostrada A35 and Autostrada A36.

Intesa Sanpaolo purchased 39.3% equity stake of Autostrade Lombarde from Autostrade per l'Italia, a subsidiary of Atlantia in 2007.

== Shareholders ==
As of 31 December 2014

1. Intesa Sanpaolo (42.4461%)
2. Società Autostrada Torino–Alessandria–Piacenza (13.3354%)
3. Impresa Pizzarotti (6.4140%)
4. Unieco (5.7726%)
5. Autostrade Centro Padane (5.4068%)
6. Mattioda Pierino e Figli (5.3450%)
7. Autostrada Brescia–Verona–Vicenza–Padova (A4 Holding) (4.9015%)
8. Milan Chamber of Commerce
  1. direct (0.0000%)
  2. Parcam (2.8177%)
9. Milano Serravalle – Milano Tangenziali (2.7794%)
10. Brescia Chamber of Commerce (2.7575%)
11. Tecnoinfrastrutture (Tecno Holding) (2.1380%)
12. Province of Bergamo (1.1396%)
13. Province of Brescia (0.8866%)
14. Bergamo Chamber of Commerce (0.7143%)
15. Cooperativa Muratori e Braccianti di Carpi (0.6414%)
16. Metropolitan City of Milan (0.6087%)
17. UBI Banca (0.6053%)
  1. direct (0.5301%)
  2. Banco di Brescia (0.0752%)
18. Cassa Rurale Treviglio (0.4122%)
19. Associazione Industriale Bresciana (0.3669%)
20. Brescia Comune (0.2031%)
21. Cremona Chamber of Commerce (0.1100%)
22. Treviglio Comune (0.0877%)
23. Banco Popolare (0.0787%)
24. Confindustria Bergamo (0.0135%)
25. Assolombarda (0.0089%)
26. Caravaggio Comune (0.0061%)
27. Travagliato Comune (0.0061%)
