= Sant'Orsola, Campogalliano =

Church in Campogalliano, Modena, Italy

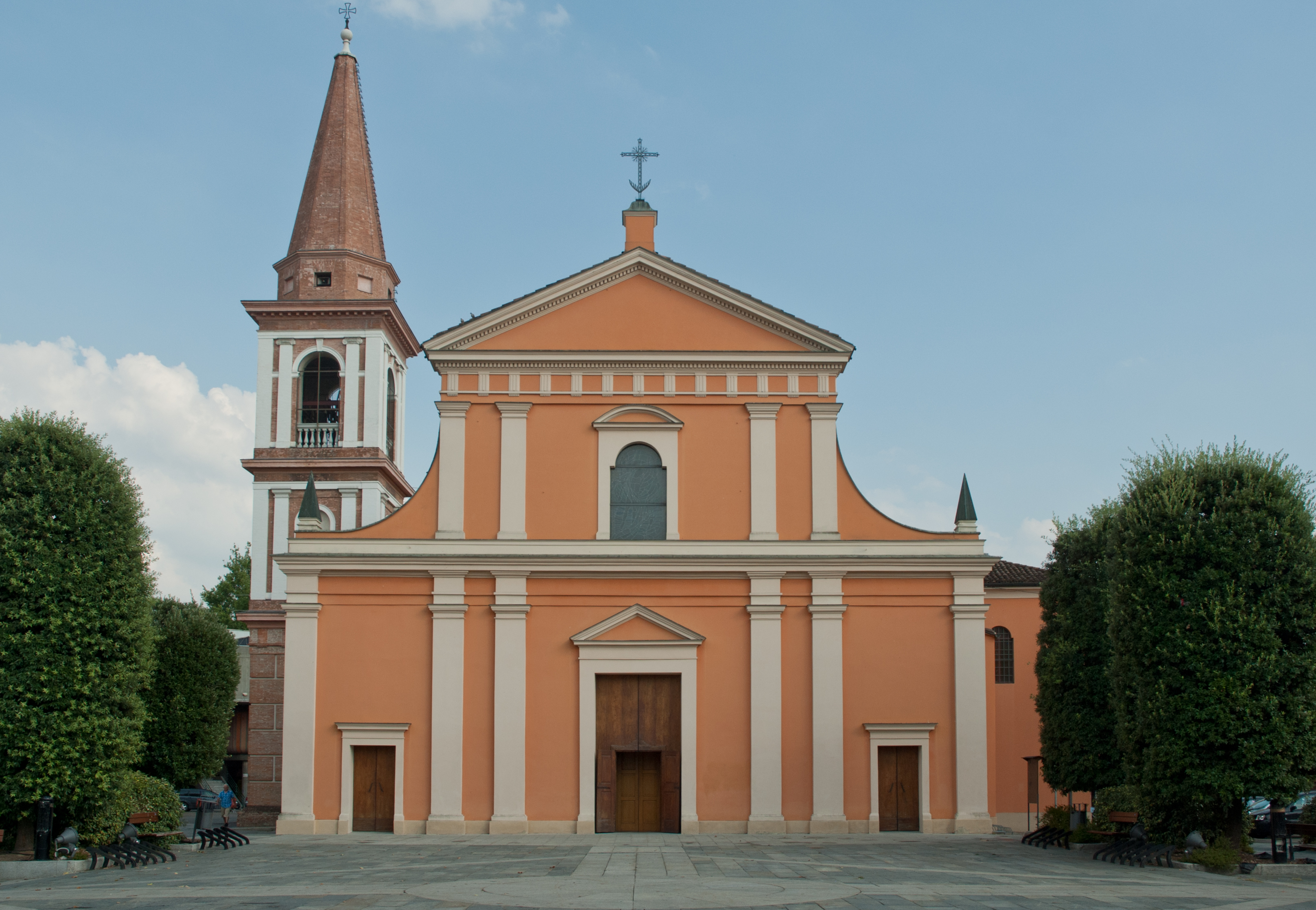
Facade of Church

Sant'Orsola is Roman Catholic parish church located in the town of Campogalliano in the province of Modena, region of Emilia-Romagna, Italy.

== History ==
An earlier church in Campogalliano was dedicated to St Ambrose, but in the 15th century it was replaced by a new church dedicated to St Agatha, named as parish church in 1501. That building was replaced by the present one in 1795, and refurbished and enlarged in 1830 by adding the flanking aisles. The bell-tower was also replaced in the 19th century. The interior contains altarpieces depicting the life of St Ursula painted during 1610–1614 by Lavinia Fontana.
