= Massimo Sarmi =

Italian businessman (born 1948)

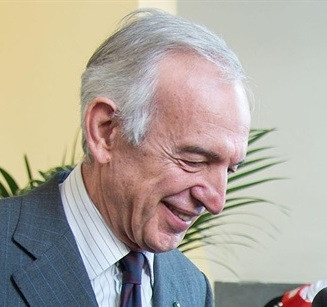
- Massimo Sarmi in 2014
- Born: August 4, 1948 (age 78); Malcesine, Italy
- Occupation: Business executive
- Known for: Chairman and chief executive officer of FiberCop

Massimo Sarmi (born 4 August 1948) is an Italian business executive who serves as the chairman and chief executive officer of FiberCop. He previously was the chief executive officer of Poste italiane Spa from May 2002 to April 2014.

== Career ==
Massimo Sarmi began his career as an engineer in the Italian Air Force.

In 1995 he became the managing director of the newly established TIM, a position that he left in 1998 and took the position of codirector for the parent company Telecom Italia.

In 2001 Siemens Italia appointed him CEO, a position he left in 2002 to become CEO of the Poste Italiane Group.

=== Poste Italiane ===
Massimo Sarmi was appointed CEO of the Poste Italiane Group in May 2002 and was reconfirmed three times (2005, 2008 and 2011).

At the head of the Group, Massimo Sarmi developed a strategy for strengthening the post office network, technological innovation, expansion of the range of services and entry into new business sectors, obtaining significant results on the financial level. Poste Italiane, under the guidance of Massimo Sarmi, established relationships with important national and international players, such as UPS, Finmeccanica, Russian Post, Microsoft, IBM, HP, Cisco, Vodafone and Ferrovie dello Stato.

Poste Italiane, under the leadership of Massimo Sarmi, was placed in the list of the "World's Most Admired Companies" drawn up by the US magazine Fortune, for five years. In 2011 Poste Italiane has been placed in fifth position in the list of the leading global operators in the delivery sector.

From July 2011 to April 2015 he is the chairman of the board of directors of Banca del Mezzogiorno – MedioCredito Centrale, a subsidiary of Poste italiane.

=== FiberCop ===
In November 2020, Massimo Sarmi became chairman of FiberCop, then a controlled subsidiary of TIM. In July 2024, he was appointed chairman of the newly independent FiberCop, the telecommunications network infrastructure company spun off from TIM and sold to a consortium of Italian and foreign institutional investors led by the private equity firm KKR. As of 23 January 2025, in addition to his role as chairman, he also assumed the position of chief executive officer of the company.

=== Other positions ===
Since 2002 he has been a member of the Board of Administration of the Bocconi University in Milan.

In May 2009 he was elected for the second time to the board of IPC (International Post Corporation), the association of the largest postal operators in the world.

Since June 2010 Massimo Sarmi has also been chairman of the Global Cyber Security Center (Gc-Sec), the international study and research body for digital communication security established in Rome on the initiative of Poste Italiane. On 6 October 2014 Sarmi became the CEO of Milano Serravalle – Milano Tangenziali.

== See also ==
- Poste Italiane
- PosteMobile
