= Gisleno Santunione =

Italian footballer

Personal information
- Date of birth: 14 April 1924
- Place of birth: Campogalliano, Kingdom of Italy
- Date of death: 28 September 1991 (aged 67)
- Position: Midfielder

Senior career*
Years	Team	Apps	(Gls)
1942–1943	Roma	1	(0)
1943–1944	Modena	4	(0)
1945–1946	Mantova	21	(0)
1946–1947	Biellese	33	(0)
1949–1951	Modena	21	(0)
1951–1952	Cesena	15	(2)
1952–1955	Cavese	37	(?)
1955–1956	Mogliese		
- * Club domestic league appearances and goals

Gisleno Santunione (14 April 1924 – 28 September 1991) was an Italian professional football player.

His debut game in the 1942/43 season for A.S. Roma remained the only Serie A game in his career.
