= Attilio Schneck =

Italian Venetist politician

Attilio Schneck (born 8 July 1946 in Schio) is an Italian Venetist politician. He is member of the Liga Veneta-Lega Nord.

He joined Liga Veneta in the early 1990s and was Mayor of Thiene from 1997 to 2007, when he was elected President of the Province of Vicenza by a landslide: in the election he obtained 60.0% of the vote against 17.2% of his major opponent.

Schneck was the president of A4 Holding.
