= Impresa di Costruzioni Ing. E. Mantovani =

- Industry: Construction company
- Headquarters: Padua, Veneto, Italy

Impresa di Costruzioni Ing. E. Mantovani known as Ing. E. Mantovani (abb. of Ingegnere Enzo Mantovani) is an Italian construction company based in Padua, Veneto. The company was found by engineer Enzo Mantovani, but was purchased by Serenissima Holding, a holding company for Chiarotto family. Serenissima Holding also owned FIP Group, which FIP Industriale supplied 8 viscous dampers (hydraulic cylinders) for the tuned mass damper of Taipei 101.

As a construction company, the company owned a stake in the operator of Padua–Venice section Autostrada A4 as part of build–operate–transfer and public–private partnership. The operation contract was expired, but the company was transformed into a holding company namely Società delle Autostrade Serenissima. Ing. E. Mantovani still owned 26.75% stake as the largest shareholders, plus an additional 8.53% held by Serenissima Holding. The company was one of the contractor of Passante di Mestre, Angel Hospital of Mestre Mestre tram system, and Terminal Ro-Ro Fusina of Venice Port. Ing. E. Mantovani owned 0.1617% stake directly in A4 Holding, the operator of Brescia–Padua section of Autostrada A4.

Ing. E. Mantovani was one of the contractors of MOSE Project, which accounted for 3.3212% stake in the consortium Consorzio Venezia Nuova.

Ing. E. Mantovani also built some of the venues of Expo 2015 in Milan.

== Controversy ==
Some manager of Mantovani, including the president Piergiorgio Baita was arrested in 2013 by Guardia di Finanza for alleged false accounting in MOSE Project.
