= Autostrada A7 (Italy) =

Controlled-access highway in Italy

Autostrada A7
- Autostrada dei Giovi; Giovi motorway

Route information
- Part of E25 and E62
- Maintained by Milano Serravalle - Milano Tangenziali (from Milan to Serravalle Scrivia) - Autostrade per l'Italia (from Serravalle Scrivia to Genoa)
- Length: 135.5 km (84.2 mi)
- Existed: 1935–present

Major junctions
- North end: Milan
- A50 in Assago; A53 in Bereguardo; A21 in Tortona; A12 in Genoa; A10 in Genoa
- South end: Genoa

Location
- Country: Italy
- Regions: Lombardy, Piedmont, Liguria

Highway system
- Roads in Italy; Autostrade; State; Regional; Provincial; Municipal
← A 6	→ A 8

The Autostrada A7 or Autostrada dei Giovi ("Giovi motorway") or Serravalle is an autostrada (Italian for "motorway") 135.5 kilometres (84.2 mi) long in Italy located in the regions of Lombardy, Piedmont and Liguria which connects Milan to Genoa. It is a part of the E25 and E62 European routes.

The Milan - Serravalle Scrivia section of the motorway is operated by Milano Serravalle – Milano Tangenziali, which the concession would last until 2028.

== Route ==
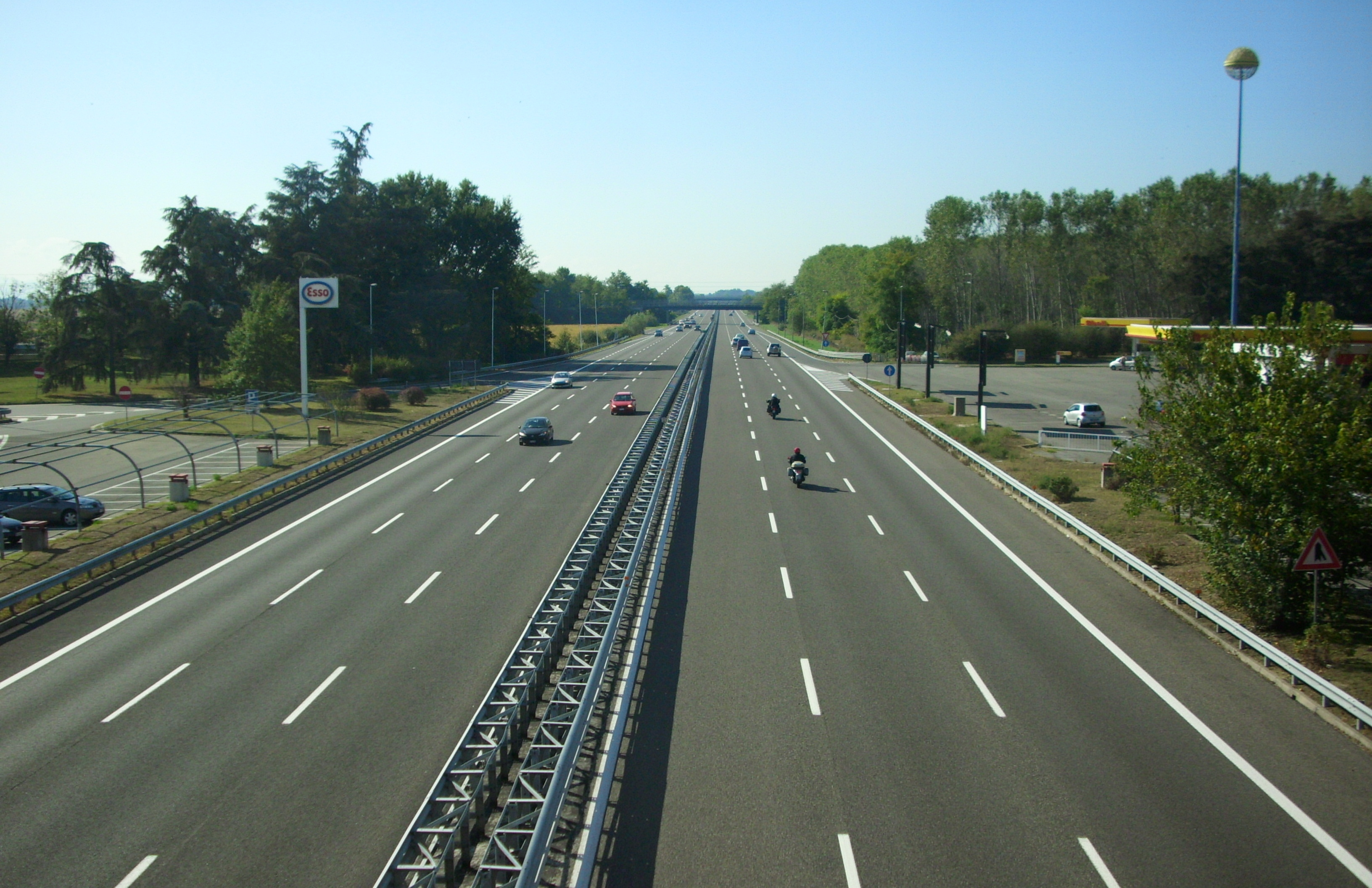
Autostrada A7 near Gropello Cairoli

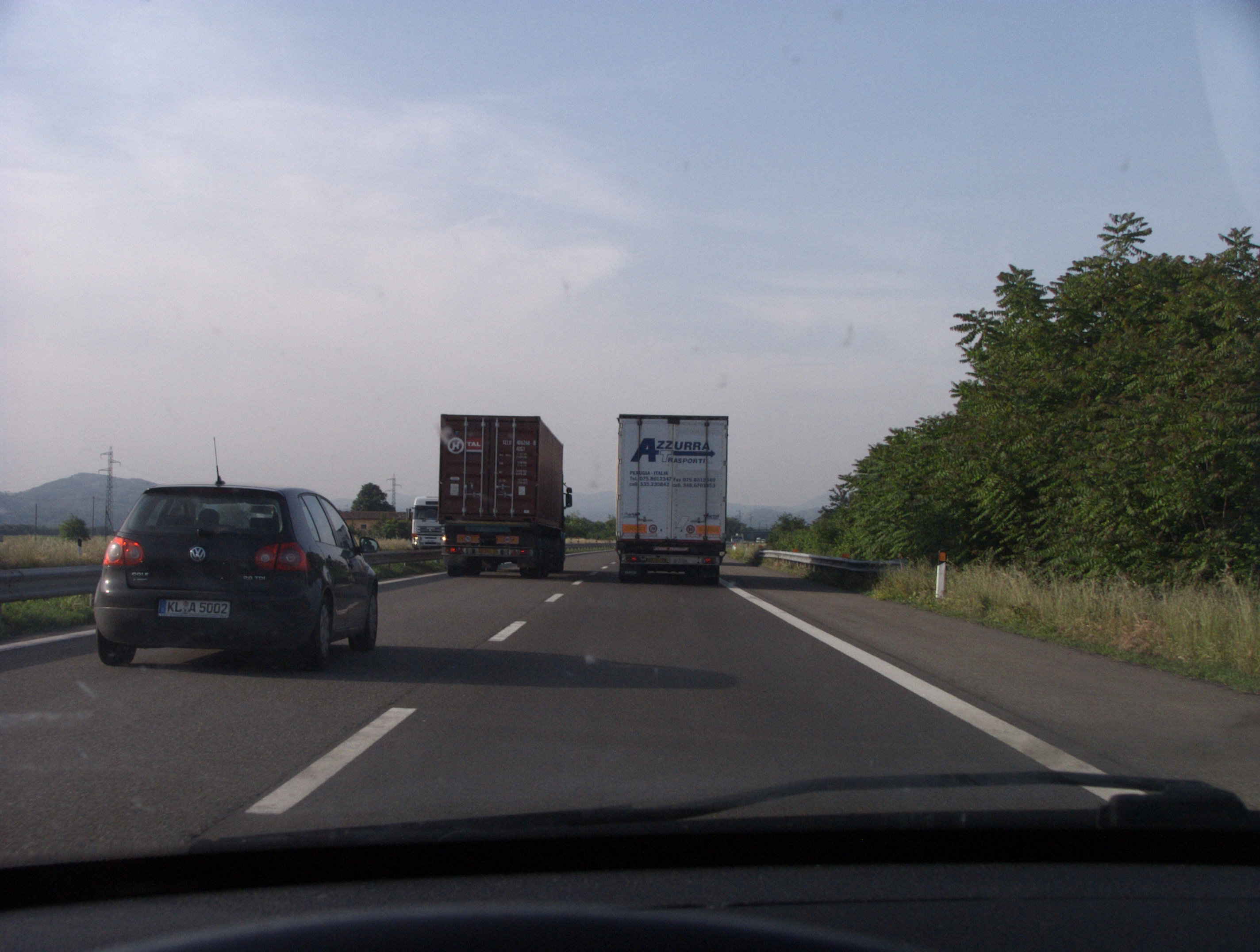
Autostrada A7 near Pozzolo Formigaro

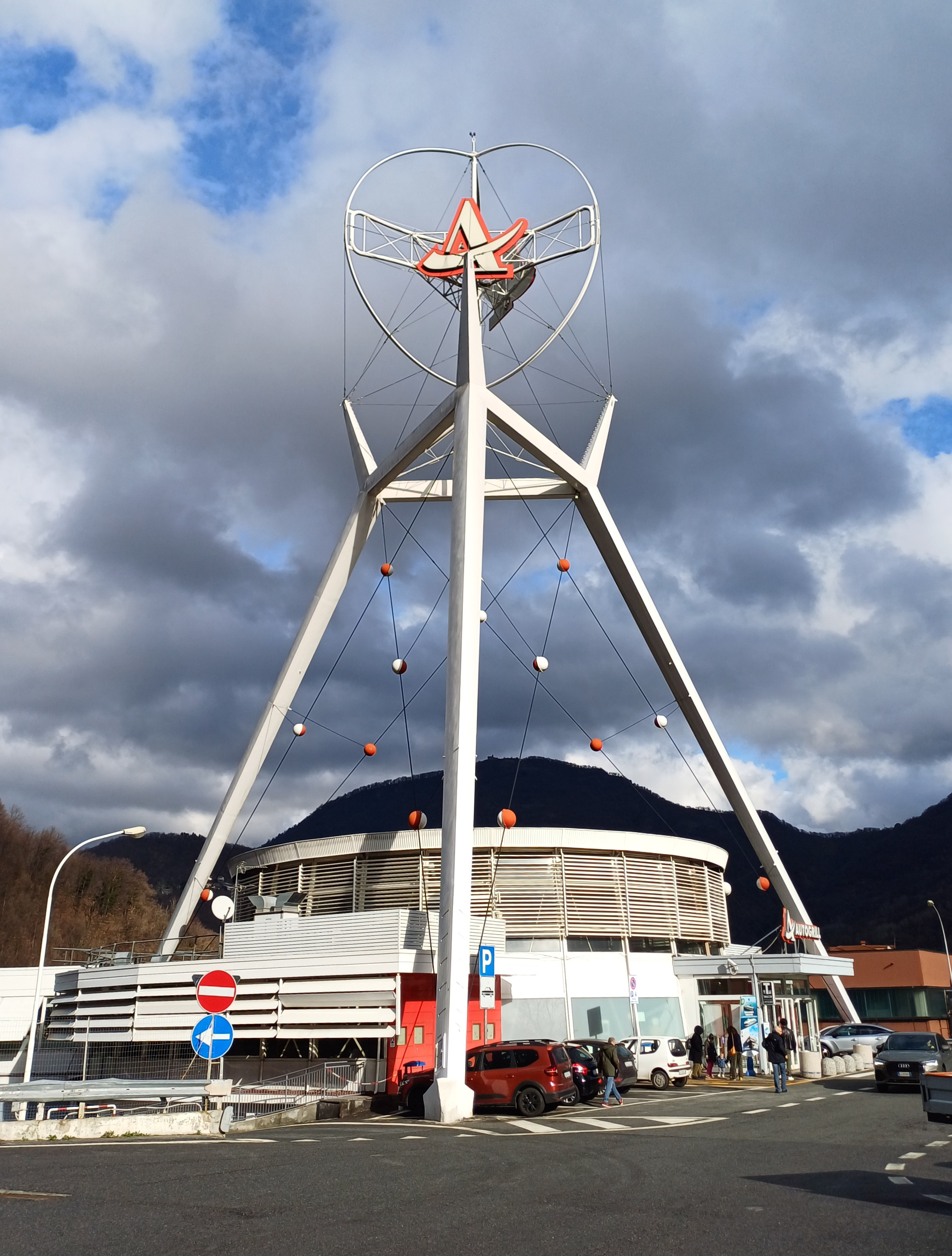
Rest area "Giovi"

MILAN – GENOA; Autostrada dei Giovi
Exit	↓km↓	↑km↑	Province	European route
Milan Piazza Maggi	−1.9 km (−1.2 mi)	1.9 km (1.2 mi)	MI	—
Milan Viale Famagosta; MM2 Famagosta	−1.1 km (−0.68 mi)	1.1 km (0.68 mi)	MI	—
Milan Via del Mare	0.0 km (0 mi)	133.0 km (82.6 mi)	MI	—
Rest area "Cantalupa"	0.5 km (0.31 mi)	132.8 km (82.5 mi)	MI	—
Assago - Milanofiori	2.0 km (1.2 mi)	131.0 km (81.4 mi)	MI	—
Tangenziale ovest di Milano; Milan Malpensa Airport; Milan Linate Airport	3.2 km (2.0 mi)	130.0 km (80.8 mi)	MI	E62
Toll gate Milan ovest	4.0 km (2.5 mi)	129.3 km (80.3 mi)	MI	E62
Binasco	10.5 km (6.5 mi)	123.0 km (76.4 mi)	MI	E62
Bereguardo - Pavia nord Bereguardo - Pavia	21.5 km (13.4 mi)	112.0 km (69.6 mi)	PV	E62
Gropello Cairoli - Pavia sud	30.6 km (19.0 mi)	103.0 km (64.0 mi)	PV	E62
Rest area "Dorno"	33.6 km (20.9 mi)	100.0 km (62.1 mi)	PV	E62
Casei Gerola	50.0 km (31.1 mi)	83.0 km (51.6 mi)	PV	E62
Castelnuovo Scrivia	54.0 km (33.6 mi)	79.0 km (49.1 mi)	AL	E62
Rest area "Castelnuovo Scrivia"	60.6 km (37.7 mi)	73.0 km (45.4 mi)	AL	E62
Torino - Piacenza - Brescia	63.0 km (39.1 mi)	70.0 km (43.5 mi)	AL	E62
Tortona	63.5 km (39.5 mi)	69.5 km (43.2 mi)	AL	E62
Diramazione Predosa - Bettole; Genoa - Gravellona Toce	72.0 km (44.7 mi)	61.0 km (37.9 mi)	AL	E62
Rest area "Bettole di Novi"	80.3 km (49.9 mi)	53.0 km (32.9 mi)	AL	E62
Serravalle Scrivia	84.5 km (52.5 mi)	48.0 km (29.8 mi)	AL	E62
Vignole Borbera - Arquata Scrivia	88.6 km (55.1 mi)	44.0 km (27.3 mi)	AL	E62
Isola del Cantone	100.7 km (62.6 mi)	32.0 km (19.9 mi)	GE	E62
Rest area "Giovi"	106.1 km (65.9 mi)	26.5 km (16.5 mi)	GE	E62
Ronco Scrivia	106.5 km (66.2 mi)	26.0 km (16.2 mi)	GE	E62
Busalla	111.5 km (69.3 mi)	22.0 km (13.7 mi)	GE	E62
Rest area "Campora"	117.5 km (73.0 mi)	16.0 km (9.9 mi)	GE	E62
Genoa Bolzaneto	125.8 km (78.2 mi)	7.0 km (4.3 mi)	GE	E62
Genoa - Livorno; Genoa est	128.7 km (80.0 mi)	4.0 km (2.5 mi)	GE	E62
Genoa - Ventimiglia; Genoa Christopher Columbus Airport	131.7 km (81.8 mi)	2.0 km (1.2 mi)	GE	E62; E25
Toll gate Genoa ovest	132.8 km (82.5 mi)	0.8 km (0.50 mi)	GE	E62; E25
Rest area "La Lanterna"	133.2 km (82.8 mi)	0.4 km (0.25 mi)	GE	E62; E25
Genoa Sampierdarena; Sopraelevata Aldo Moro; Genoa centro Port of Genoa	133.6 km (83.0 mi)	0.0 km (0 mi)	GE	E62; E25

=== A7/A26 Bettole-Predosa connection ===
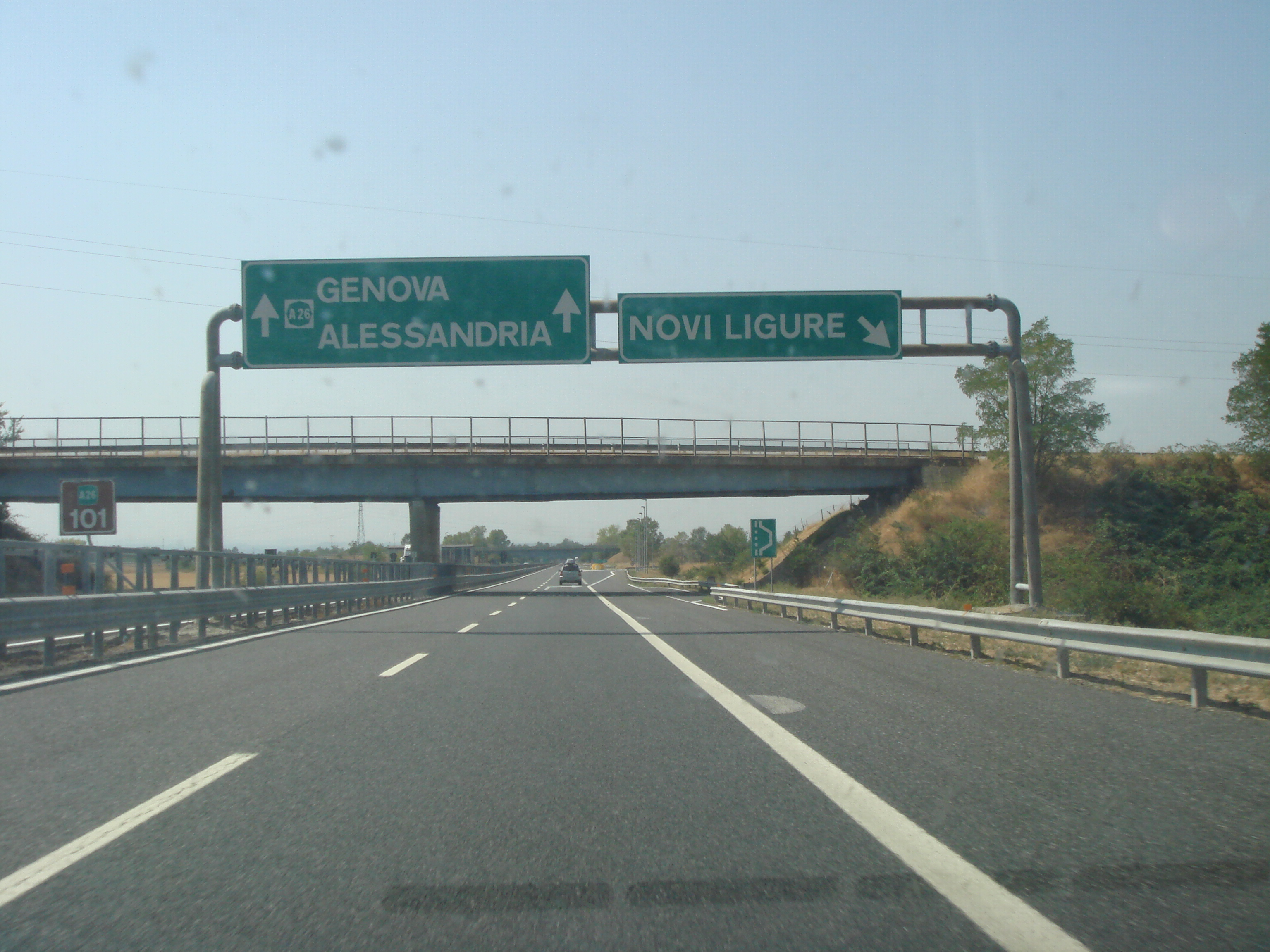
A7/A26 Bettole-Predosa connection

AUTOSTRADA A26/A7; A7/A26 Bettole-Predosa connection
Exit	↓km↓	↑km↑	Province	European route
Genoa - Gravellona Toce	0.0 km (0 mi)	17.0 km (10.6 mi)	AL	--
Novi Ligure	7.9 km (4.9 mi)	9.1 km (5.7 mi)	AL	--
Rest area "Marengo"	9.7 km (6.0 mi)	7.3 km (4.5 mi)	AL	--
Milan - Genoa	17.0 km (10.6 mi)	0.0 km (0 mi)	AL	--

== See also ==
- Autostrade of Italy
- Roads in Italy
- Transport in Italy

=== Other Italian roads ===
- State highways (Italy)
- Regional road (Italy)
- Provincial road (Italy)
- Municipal road (Italy)
