= Autostrada A22 (Italy) =

Controlled-access highway in Italy

Autostrada A22
- Italian: Autostrada del Brennero; German: Brennerautobahn; Brenner motorway

Route information
- Part of E45
- Maintained by Autostrada del Brennero S.p.A.
- Length: 315 km (196 mi)
- Existed: 1968–present

Major junctions
- South end: Modena
- A1 in Modena; A4 in Verona
- North end: Brenner Pass

Location
- Country: Italy
- Regions: Emilia-Romagna, Lombardy, Veneto, Trentino-Alto Adige/Südtirol

Highway system
- Roads in Italy; Autostrade; State; Regional; Provincial; Municipal
← A 21	→ A 23

The Autostrada A22 or Autobrennero or Autostrada del Brennero ("Brenner motorway"; German: Brennerautobahn) is one of the most important autostrada (Italian for "motorway") in Italy, as it connects Po Valley, the city of Modena and the Autostrada A1 to Austria through the Brenner Pass, located in the municipality of Brenner. The Autostrada A22 is 315 kilometres (196 mi) long. It is a part of the E45 European route. The operator of the road is Autostrada del Brennero S.p.A. The Autostrada A22 is located in the regions of Emilia-Romagna, Lombardy, Veneto and Trentino-Alto Adige/Südtirol.

== History ==
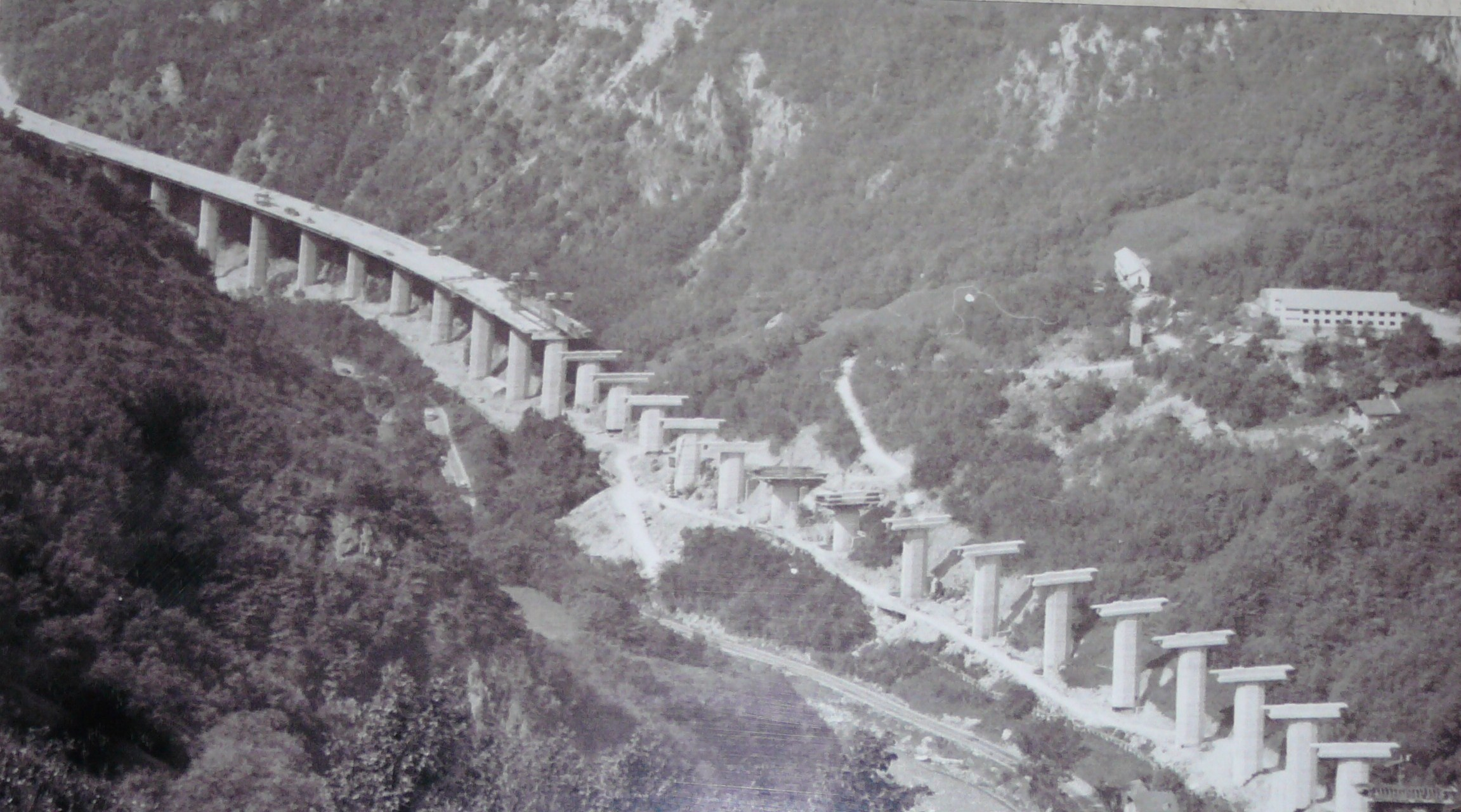
The construction of one of the many viaducts of the Autostrada A22 in the 1970s

In 1949, during the Geneva Convention on Road Traffic, it was designed a route, identified as E56, leading from Scandinavia to the southernmost point of Italy. The current Autobrennero track was already part of that route plan.

The next step for the fulfillment of the project was the foundation of Autostrada del Brennero S.p.A., on 20 February 1959, that two years later was given the concession for the building and the following management of the highway. Autostrada del Brennero S.p.A. is still the company which curates A22 infrastructure. The motorway track was initially designed by Bruno and Lino Gentilini, assisted by senator Guido de Unterrichter. The first plan was then edited, and it was made up by two carriageways, 7,5 × 2 metres each. The project Verona-Brenner was approved by ANAS on 25 January 1962, while the segment Verona-Modena was approved during the following year. Later on, several plots of land had to be dispossessed, underpasses and flyovers had to be built (for both roads and railroads), 307 kilometers of power lines and 74 km of telephone lines even had to be moved away. It all required about 23 billion lira.

In 1963, the definitive track plan was approved. The first segment open to the public – 50 km between Bolzano and Trento – was inaugurated on 21 December 1968. The first motorway traffic between Italy and Austria occurred on 5 April 1971.

After the opening of other segments, the highway could be considered as definitively completed on 11 April 1974, with the inauguration of the section between Chiusa and Bolzano, resulting in the most complicated one due to the complex infrastructural and engineering work. Overall, at that time 21 entrance-and-exit toll booths and 12 service stations were opened.

At that time the overall cost of A22 amounted to 243,721,821,000 lire, or about 780 million lire per kilometer. Only in 1984, highway A22 managed to have its first net profit.

During the years, the expressway A22 had been subjected to few track modifications; mostly toll booths have been opened or closed. For instance:

- "Bressanone sud – Zona industriale (= industrial area)": opened just for the ones heading north or coming from the north. It is expected the opening toward the other direction, too;
- "Trento sud": opened on 3 May 2011, costed 17,5 million euros, including the new bridge above Adige;
- "Trento centro": only the highway exits (not entrance ones) have been closed since 23 May 2011.

Nowadays, the motorway consists of 313,5 km of track, with 23 entrance toll booths, 22 exit toll booths, 6 security centers, 6 service centers, and 22 gas stations.

== Features ==
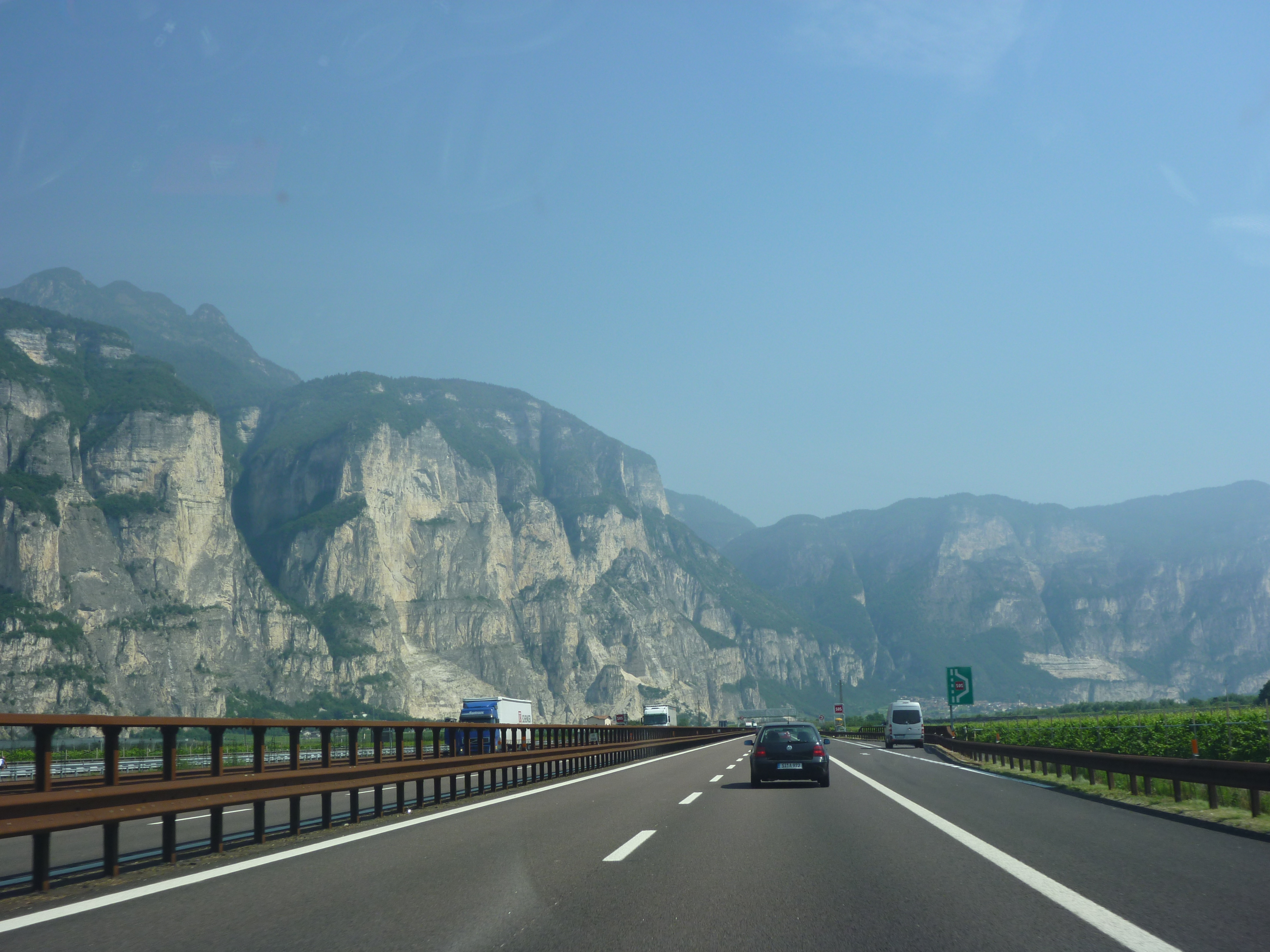
Autostrada A22 from Verona to Bolzano

With a total of 313 km of highway track, A22 originates near Modena, at the interchange on motorway A1, not far from Modena Nord toll booth. After Modena, the motorway traverses the whole Po Valley, overshooting Carpi and Mantua. In Verona A22 crosses highway A4, afterwards it settles in the Adige Valley, in parallel to Lake Garda. It goes past Rovereto, then passing through Trento and Bolzano. From here, it sets inside the Isarco Valley (known in German as 'Eisacktal'), tighter than Po and Adige valleys. Therefore, here A22 twists and turns through the valley, easily overtaking Bressanone and then going over Vipiteno toll booth. Finally, A22 reaches the Brenner Pass in Brennero, where it gets the Austrian border and comes to its end. Here, the passageway Modena-Munich goes on crossing the boundary, following the Austrian A13 Brenner Autobahn. As it clearly appears, A22 is a strongly important highway for connections and transports between Southern and Northern Europe, designed on a track studied and planned to make use of one of the lowest mountain passes in the Alps, the Brenner Pass – one of the busiest borders in Europe – located at only 1375 m above sea level.

Statistical studies calculated that this expressway moves 30,000–40,000 vehicles per day (among them, approximately a third are heavy vehicles), with higher peaks during holiday transfers; sometimes the circulation of traffic comes to a standstill, because of this congestion, causing several serious breakings, queues and small accidents and rear-end collisions, also due to the limitation of the track at just two lanes. To avoid these problems, it is suggested and incentivized the use of intermodal freight transport for the heavy vehicles, taking them onto specific wagons or boxcars, and the conveyance abroad from Verona by railway.

A22 guardrails, whose brown colour is very typical, are made in Corten Steel, an alloy showing elevated corrosion resistance rates and high mechanical strength.

Traffic news in Trentino-Alto Adige are provided by Radio NBC (in Italian) and radio Südtirol 1 (in German), whereas in the remaining section are broadcast by radio Pico.

=== Track ===
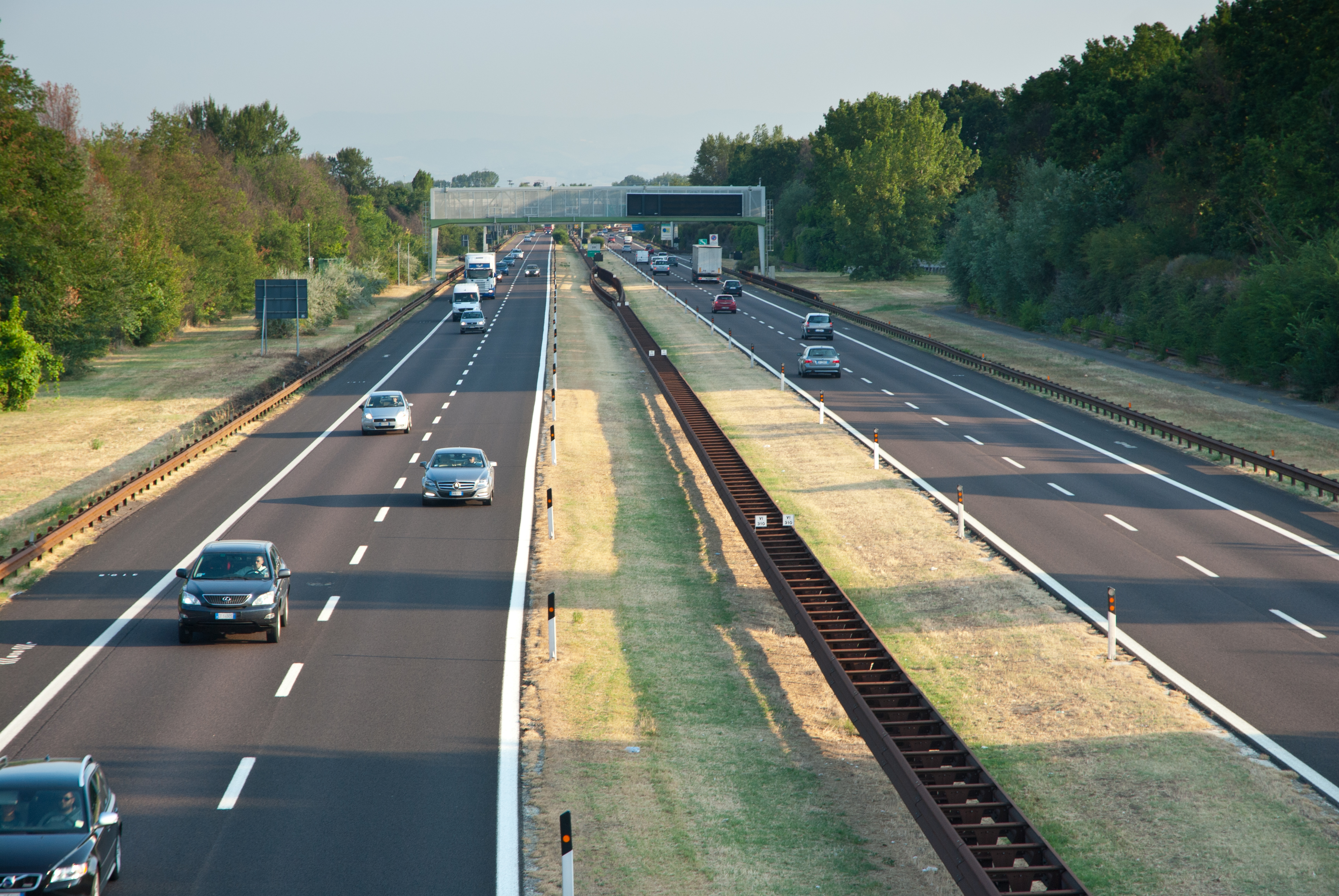
Autostrada A22 near Campogalliano

The highway is 315 km long: the track begins nearby Modena, at the junction with Autostrada A1, and vertically crosses the whole Northern Italy, finally reaching at the Brenner Pass, along the Austrian border. Once over the boundary, the expressway is connected with A13 Austrian motorway (Brennerautobahn A13, Innsbruck-Brenner). A22 highway passes through four Italian regions (Trentino-Alto Adige, Veneto, Lombardy, Emilia-Romagna). The management of the road has been assigned since its construction to specific concessionaires and motorway maintenance companies.

=== European roads ===
A22 highway, inside the network of European roads, is part for its entire track of the north–south route E45, connecting Karesuando and Gela. The main intersection with the west–east routes is with E70 (in that point represented by Italian motorway A4) in Verona.

=== Signage ===
Signage is bilingual: both in Italian and in German, due to the fact that in the South Tyrol these two languages are official.

== Route ==
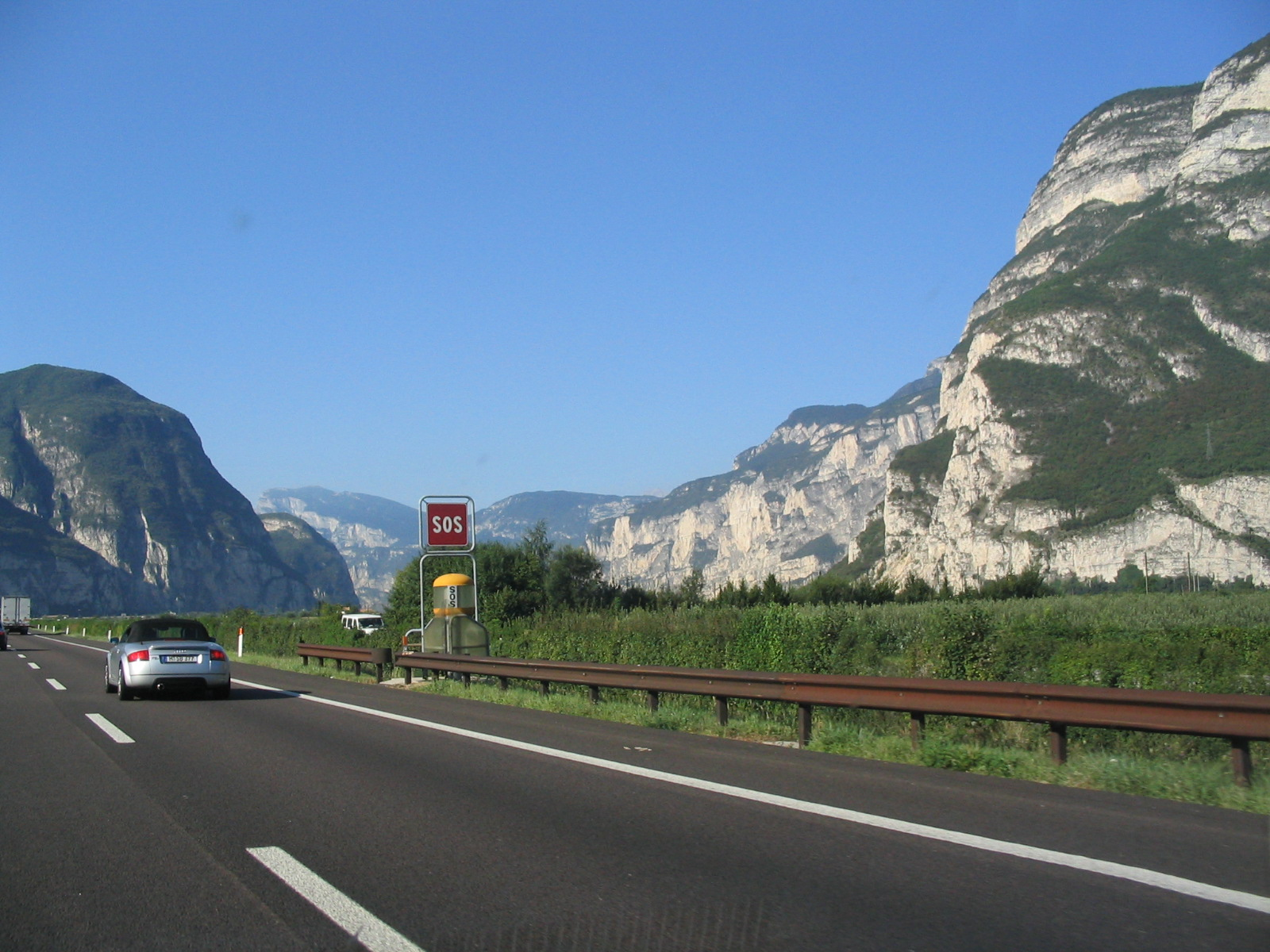
Autostrada A22 near Egna

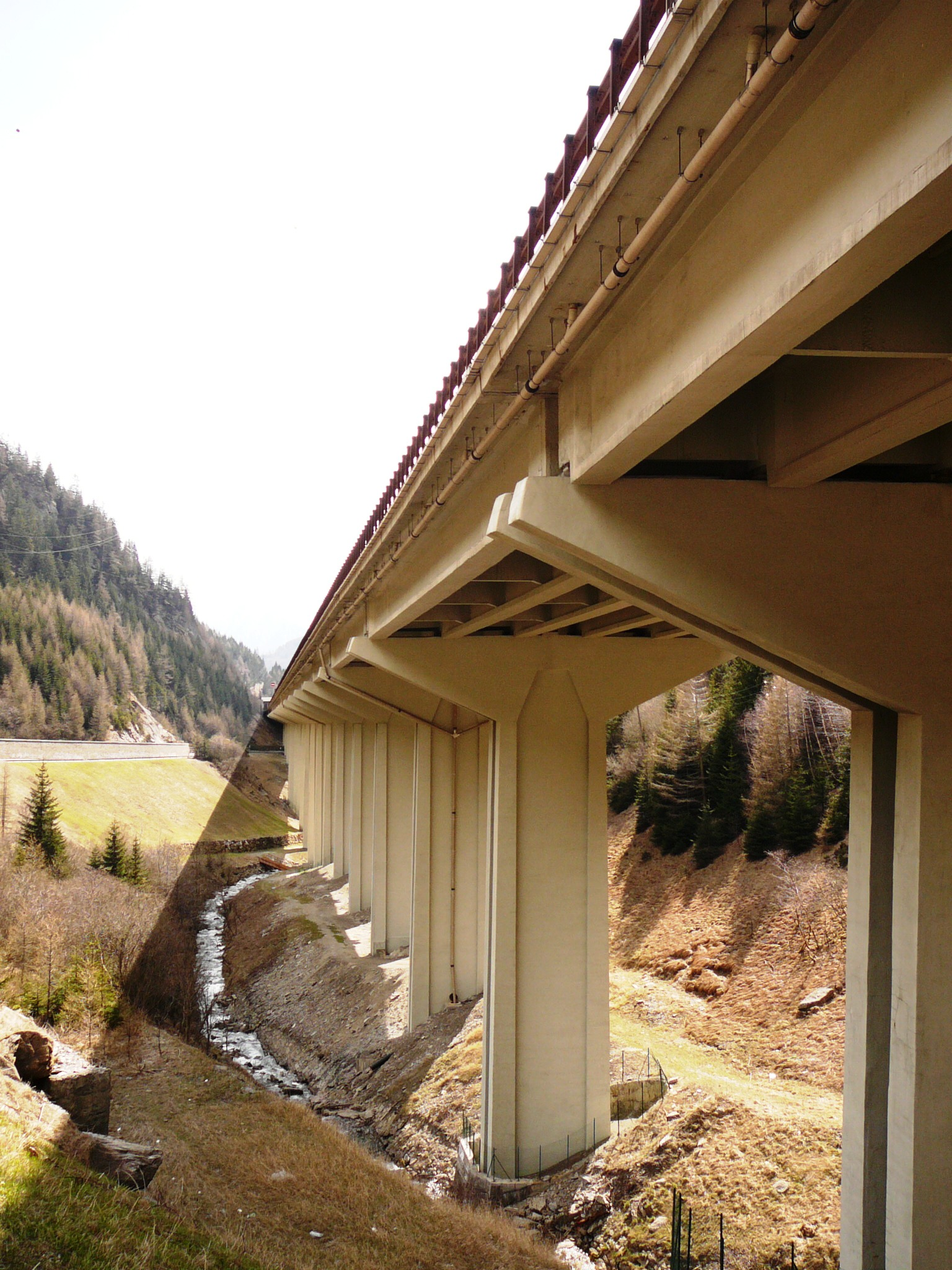
Autostrada A22 near Terme di Brennero

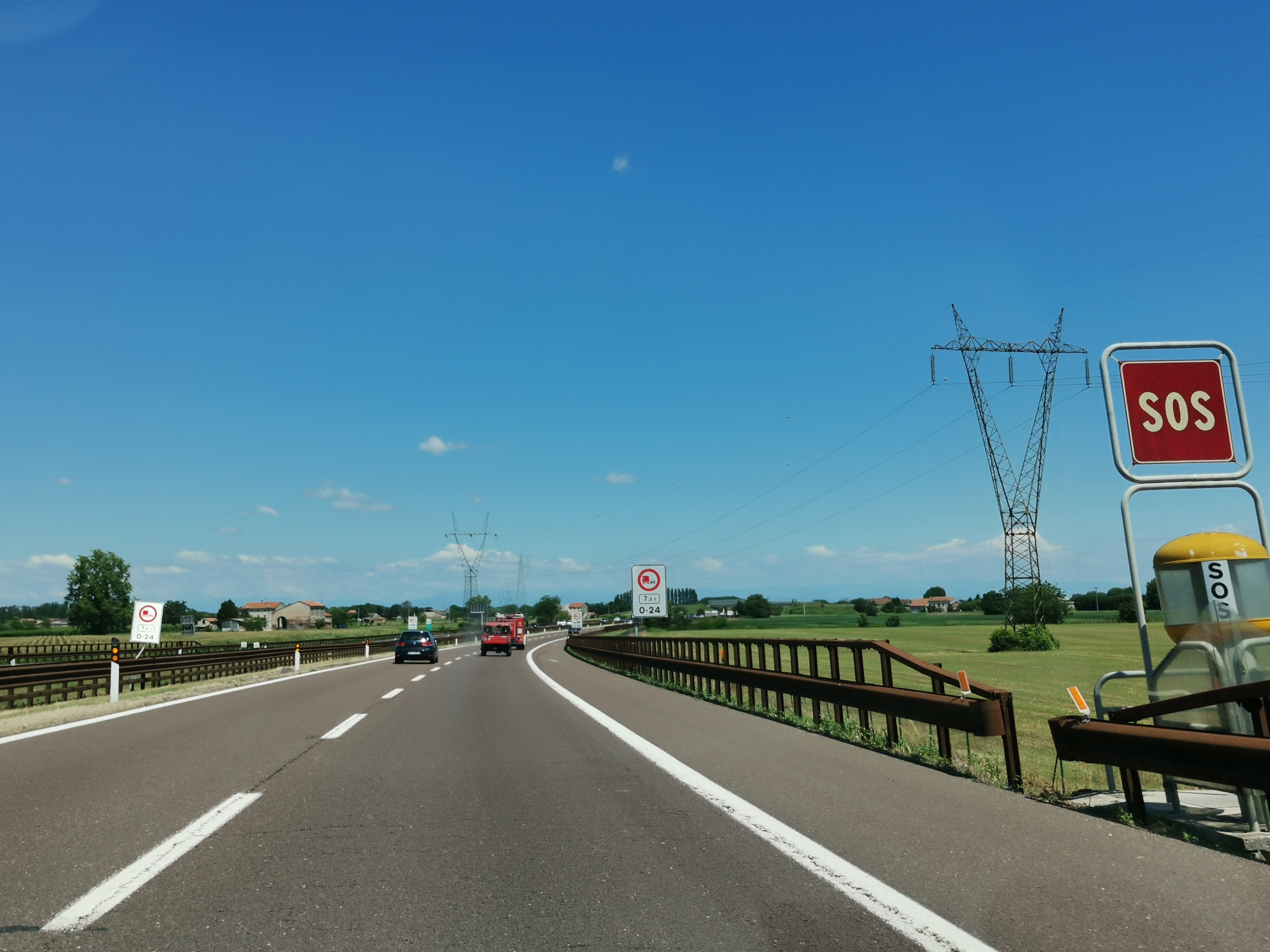
Autostrada A22 near Pegognaga

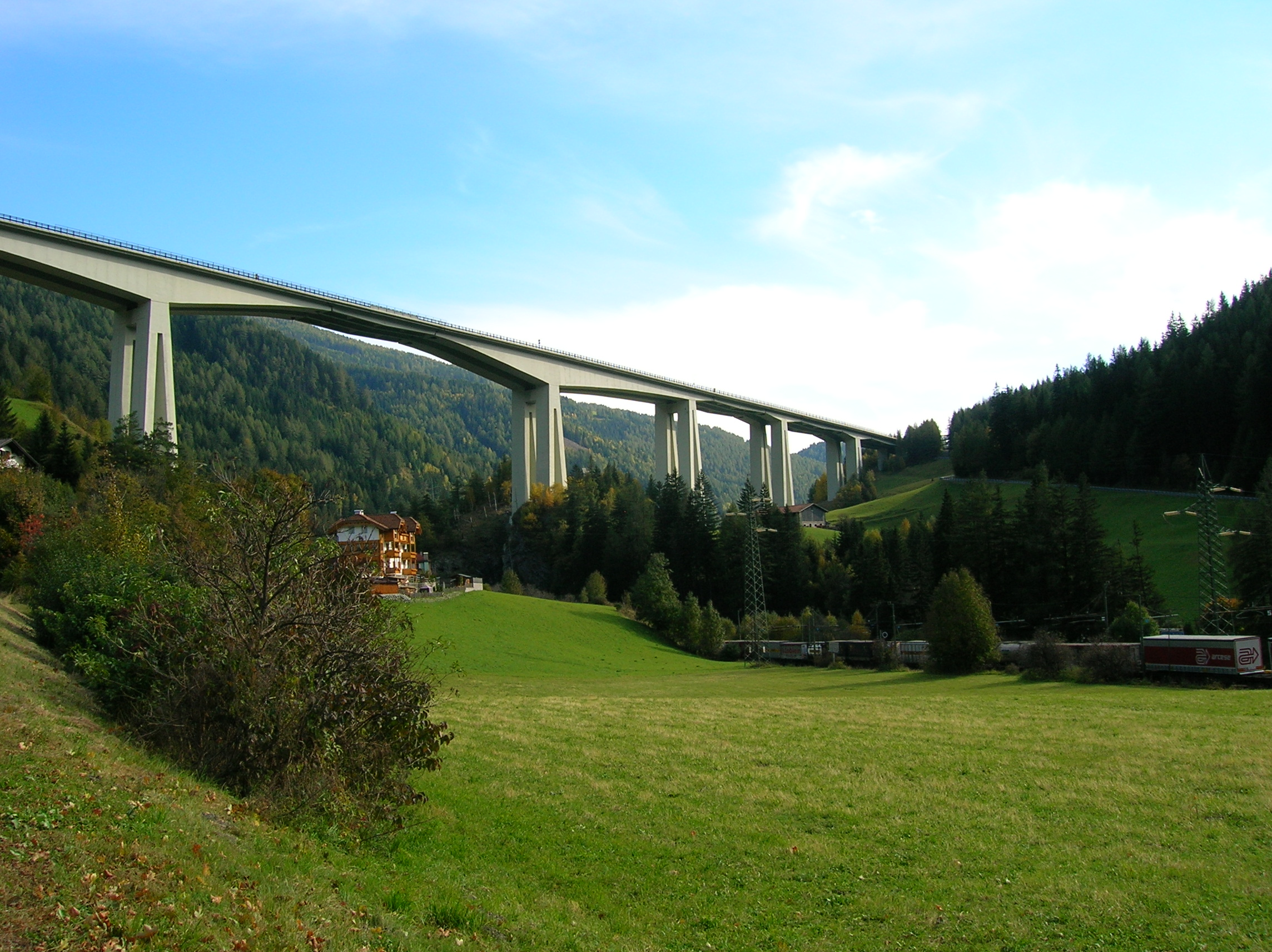
Autostrada A22 near Colle Isarco

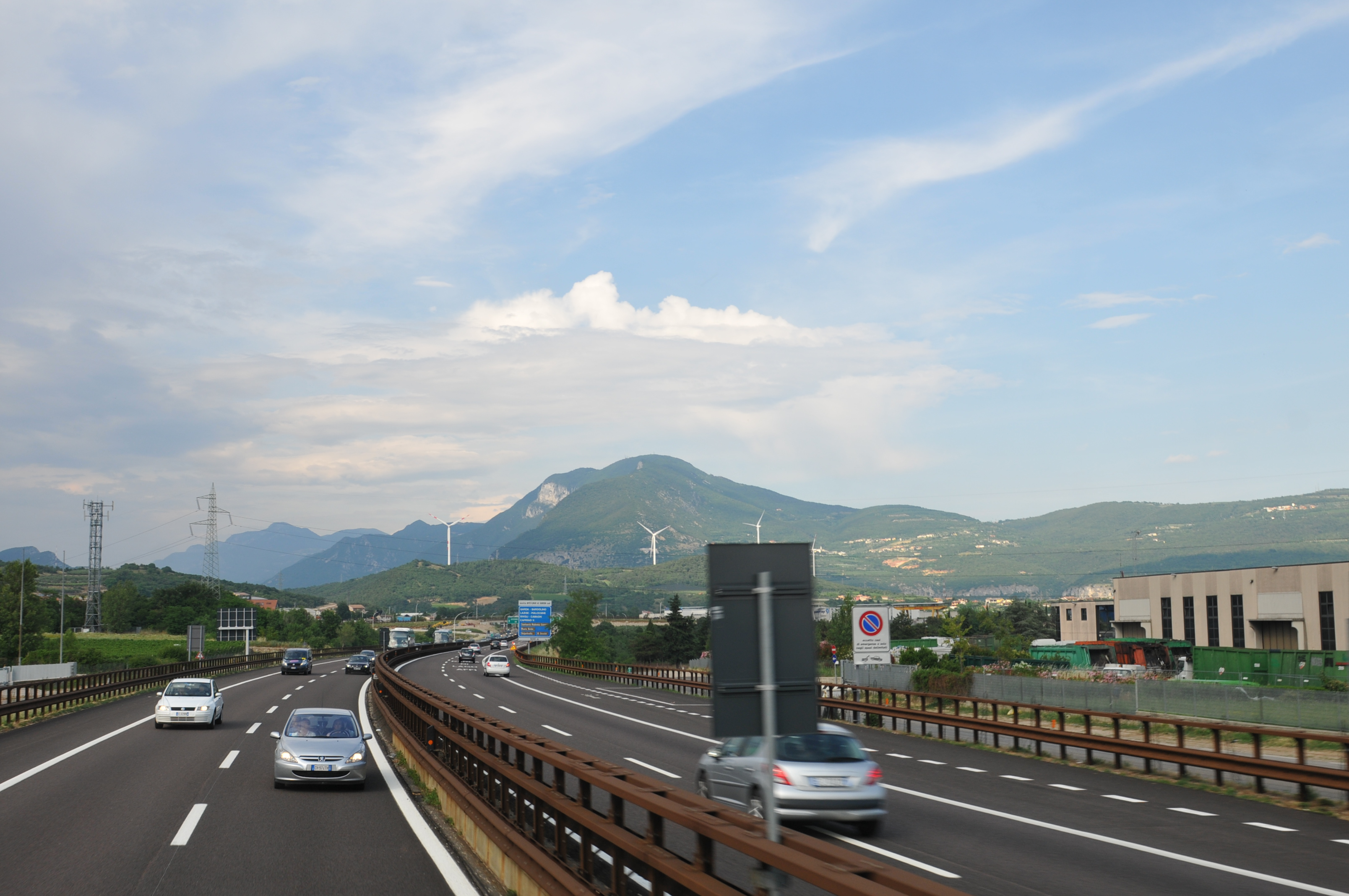
Autostrada A22 near Affi

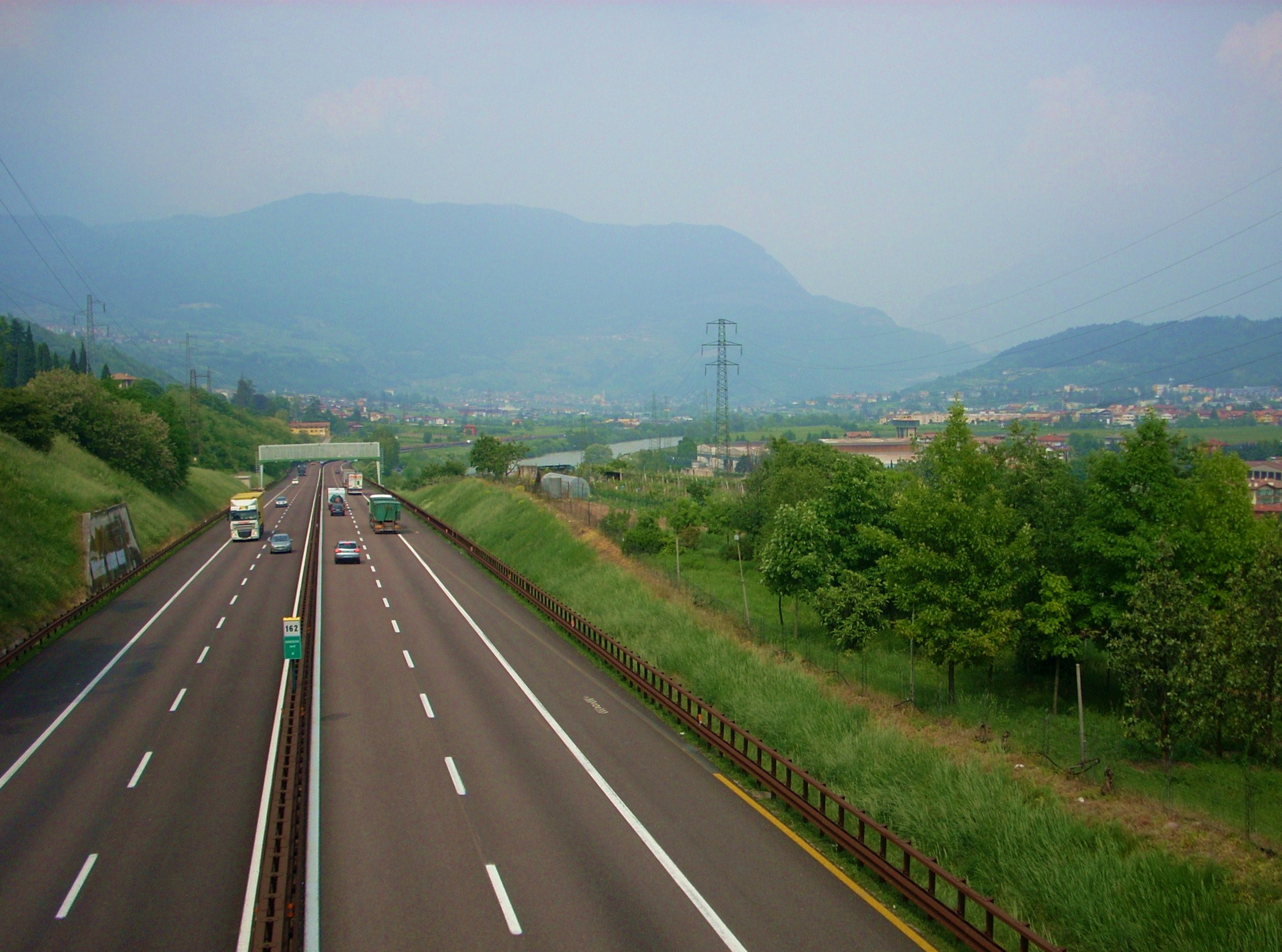
Autostrada A22 near Rovereto

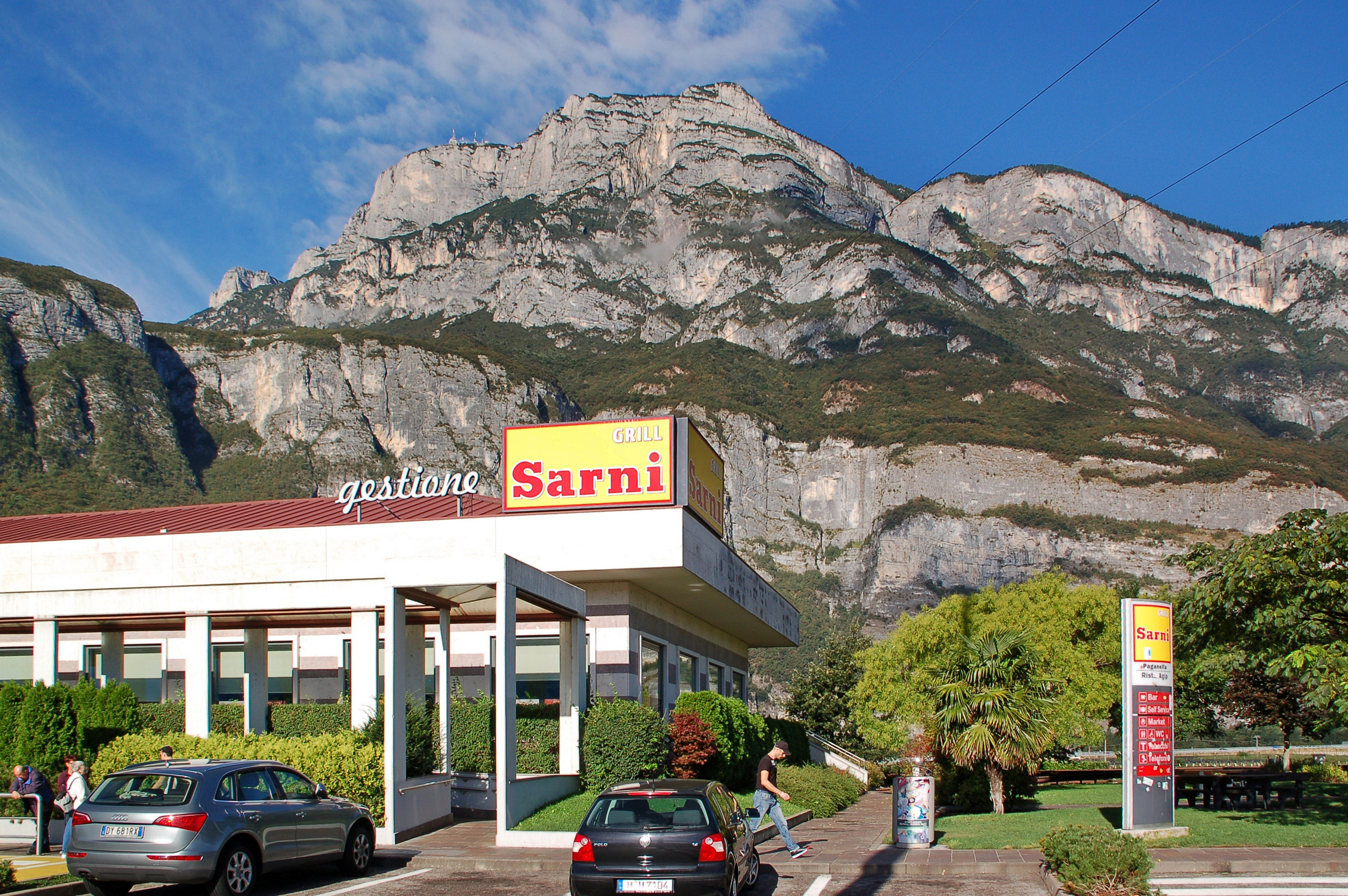
Rest area "Paganella"

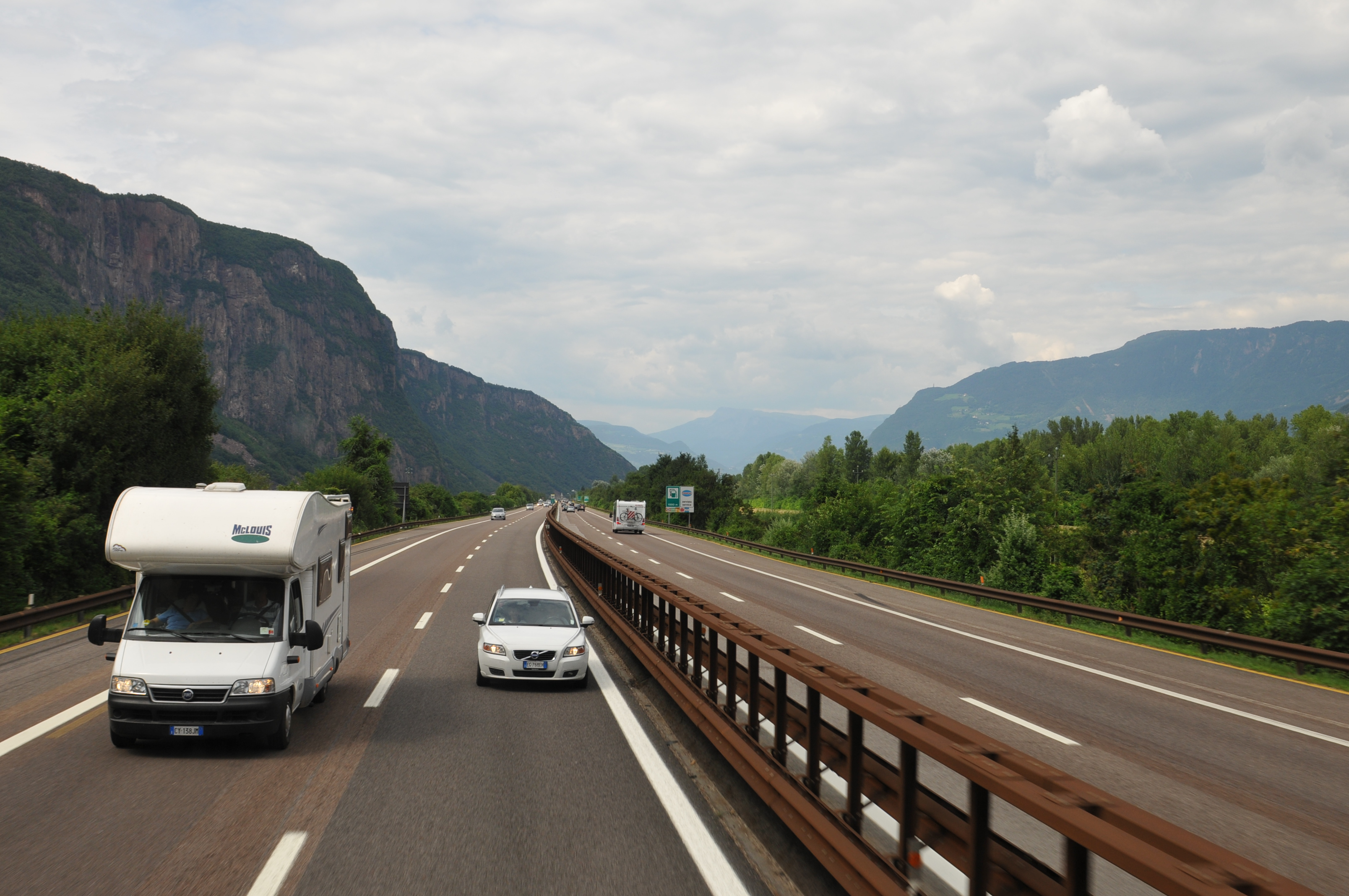
Autostrada A22 near Vadena

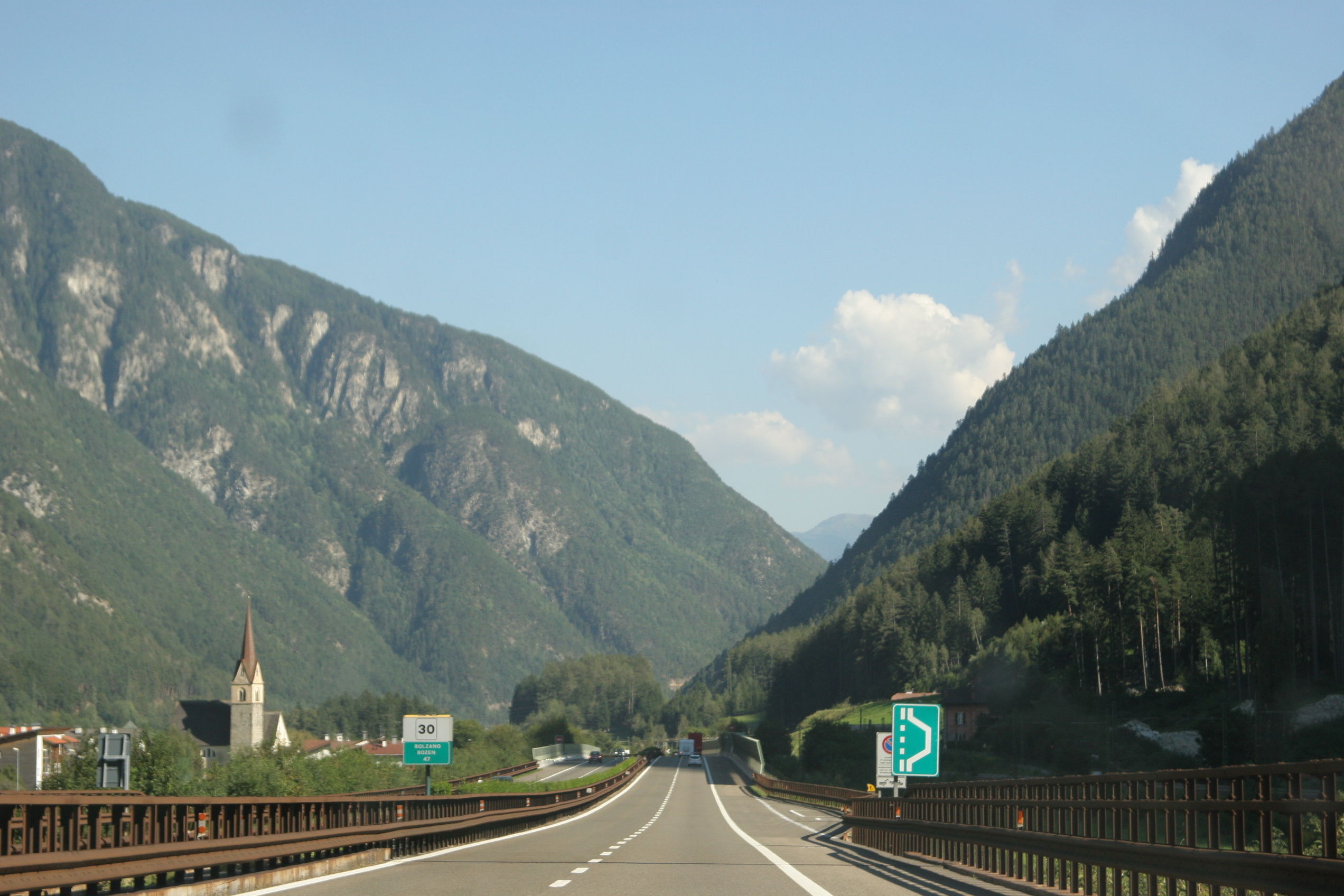
Autostrada A22 near Fortezza

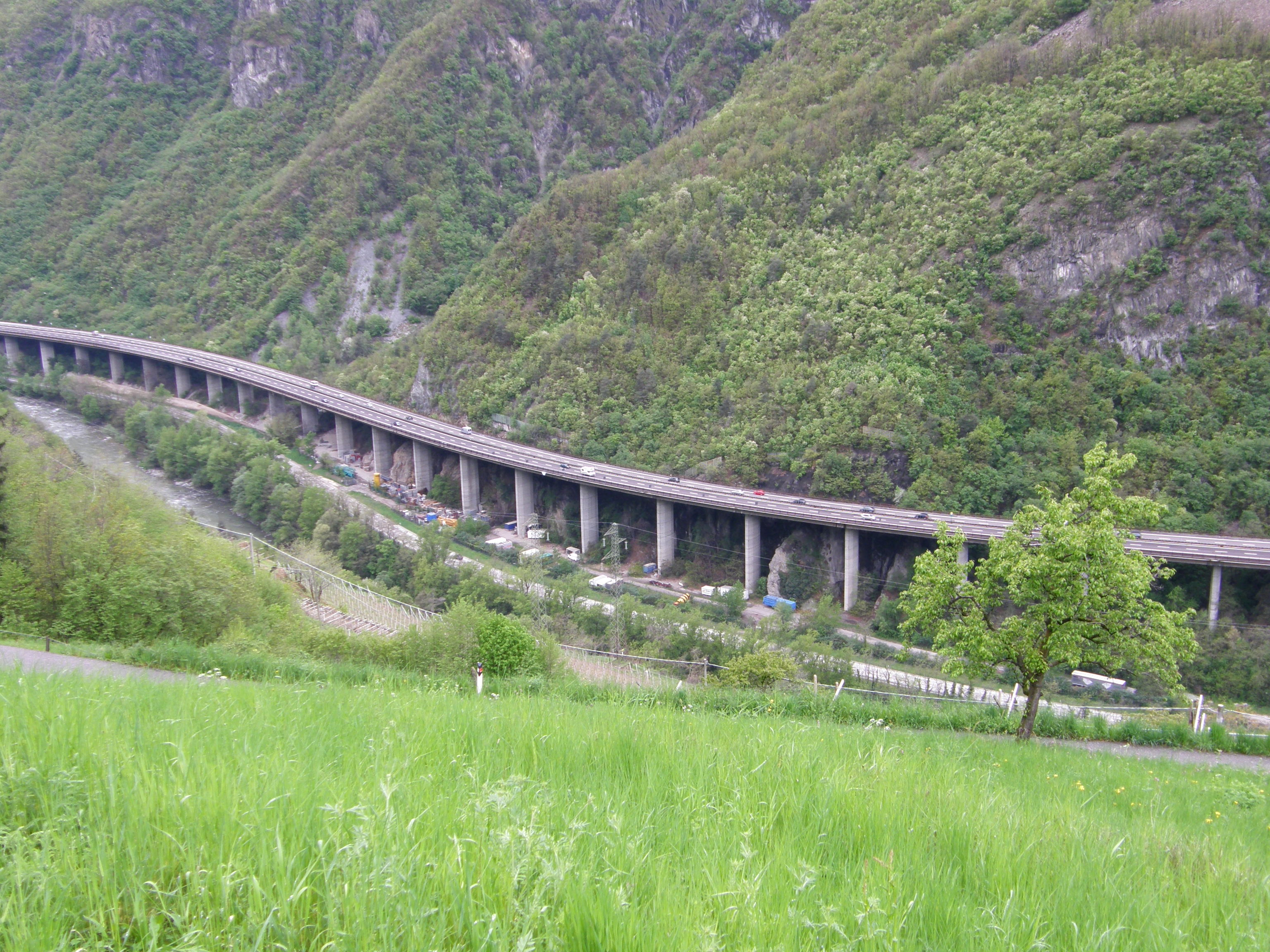
Autostrada A22 near Renon

MODENA – BRENNERO; Autostrada del Brennero
Exit	↓km↓	↑km↑	Province	European Route
Milano - Bologna	0 km (0 mi)	315 km (196 mi)	MO	E45
Campogalliano	3 km (1.9 mi)	311 km (193 mi)	MO	E45
Rest area "Campogalliano"	5 km (3.1 mi)	309 km (192 mi)	MO	E45
Carpi	11 km (6.8 mi)	303 km (188 mi)	MO	E45
Reggiolo - Rolo	28 km (17 mi)	286 km (178 mi)	RE	E45
Pegognaga; Suzzara - Parma	37 km (23 mi)	277 km (172 mi)	MN	E45
Rest area "Po"	47 km (29 mi)	267 km (166 mi)	MN	E45
Mantua south	49 km (30 mi)	265 km (165 mi)	MN	E45
Mantua north	57 km (35 mi)	257 km (160 mi)	MN	E45
Nogarole Rocca	71 km (44 mi)	243 km (151 mi)	VR	E45
Rest area "Povegliano"	74 km (46 mi)	240 km (150 mi)	VR	E45
Milano - Venezia; Verona sud	86 km (53 mi)	228 km (142 mi)	VR	E45
Verona nord Verona Villafranca Airport	88 km (55 mi)	226 km (140 mi)	VR	E45
Rest area "Garda"	104 km (65 mi)	210 km (130 mi)	VR	E45
Affi - Lago di Garda sud Lake Garda	108 km (67 mi)	206 km (128 mi)	VR	E45
Rest area "Adige"	128 km (80 mi)	186 km (116 mi)	VR	E45
Ala - Avio Castle of Avio; Monte Baldo - Prà Alpesina	135 km (84 mi)	179 km (111 mi)	TN	E45
Rovereto south - Lake Garda north Lake Garda; Riva del Garda di Loppio e Val di Ledro - Giudicarie	147 km (91 mi)	167 km (104 mi)	TN	E45
Rest area "Nogaredo"	154 km (96 mi)	160 km (99 mi)	TN	E45
Rovereto nord Lake Cei del Pasubio- Vallarsa	156 km (97 mi)	158 km (98 mi)	TN	E45
Trento sud del Caffaro - Valle del Chiese - Storo di Campiglio - Val Rendena di Val d'Assa e Pedemontana Costo - Altopiano della Vigolana	174 km (108 mi)	140 km (87 mi)	TN	E45
Trento centro Gardesana Occidentale	178 km (111 mi)	136 km (85 mi)	TN	E45
Trento nord Interporto di Trento della Valsugana delle Dolomiti - Fiemme Valley e Fassa Valley della Val di Non - Non Valley e Val di Sole della Val di Cembra	182 km (113 mi)	132 km (82 mi)	TN	E45
Rest area "Paganella"	185 km (115 mi)	129 km (80 mi)	TN	E45
San Michele all'Adige - Mezzocorona; Lake Molveno della Val di Non - Mezzolombardo di Campiglio - Madonna di Campiglio dei Laghi di Molveno e Tenno - Paganella	193 km (120 mi)	121 km (75 mi)	TN	E45
Egna - Ora - Termeno del Grappa e del Passo Rolle - San Martino di Castrozza; Strada del vino dell'Alto Adige	212 km (132 mi)	102 km (63 mi)	BZ	E45
Rest area "Castel Varco"	218 km (135 mi)	99 km (62 mi)	BZ	E45
Bolzano sud / Bolzano South; Fiera di Bolzano; Bolzano Airport dello Stelvio del Tonale e della Mendola - Mendel Pass	229 km (142 mi)	85 km (53 mi)	BZ	E45
Bolzano north - Val d'Ega	237 km (147 mi)	77 km (48 mi)	BZ	E45
Rest area "Sciliar (Note: Southbound only)	—	69 km (43 mi)	BZ	E45
Rest area "Isarco (Note: Northbound only)	250 km (160 mi)	—	BZ	E45
Chiusa - Val Gardena di Val Gardena e Passo Sella - Laion	261 km (162 mi)	53 km (33 mi)	BZ	E45
Brixen industrial zone Brixen industrial area	266 km (165 mi)	48 km (30 mi)	BZ	E45
Rest area "Plose"	272 km (169 mi)	42 km (26 mi)	BZ	E45
Bressanone - Val Pusteria della Pusteria di Val Badia della Valle Aurina di Alemagna - Cortina d'Ampezzo	276 km (171 mi)	38 km (24 mi)	BZ	E45
Rest area "Trens"	294 km (183 mi)	20 km (12 mi)	BZ	E45
Vipiteno dell'Abetone e del Brennero del Passo di Giovo di Val Sarentino e del Passo di Vizze	298 km (185 mi)	16 km (9.9 mi)	BZ	E45
Toll gate "Brennero"	298 km (185 mi)	16 km (9.9 mi)	BZ	E45
Colle Isarco (Note: Only exit towards Brenner) dell'Abetone e del Brennero	307 km (191 mi)	—	BZ	E45
Terme di Brennero (Note: Entry only towards Modena)	—	6 km (3.7 mi)	BZ	E45
Brennero sud dell'Abetone e del Brennero - Val di Fleres	309 km (192 mi)	5 km (3.1 mi)	BZ	E45
Rest area "Plessi"; Plessi Museum	312 km (194 mi)	1 km (0.62 mi)	BZ	E45
Austria–Italy border Brenner Autobahn - Innsbruck	313 km (194 mi)	0 km (0 mi)	BZ	E45

== Works and projects ==
=== Dynamic lane ===
In the section between Trento South and Rovereto North, a pilot project of the so-called "third dynamic lane", which includes the use of the breakdown lane as a normal drive lane when occurring particular situations such as traffic congestions. This is signalled to drivers by determined lightning Variable-message signs along the route as they display green arrows if the breakdown lane is usable as a normal lane, oblique yellow arrows if the third lane is being shut down, and red crosses if the third lane is closed and can be used only in case of emergency. This project includes the use of the dynamic lane technique also in the segment between Bolzano South and Verona North tollbooths, where it is scheduled to take place the interchange with the third permanent lane (which is going to be built) up to the intersection with motorway A1 in Modena.

=== Third lane ===
By 2016 the work for the realisation of the third motorway lane in the segment between Verona North toll booth and the intersection with highway A1 in Modena North had begun. In this last section, the interchange will be enlarged enough to satisfy the needs of the constantly rising traffic. Moreover, it will be already prearranged for the future add-on towards Sassuolo (through a beltway). For this extension of the motorway, no land expropriations are planned to be brought. Instead, the already present 11 meters of central reservation between the two carriageways will be used. This intervention also provides for the widening of the hard shoulder of about one meter. Furthermore, it is planned the building of lay-by stopping places every 500 meters.

=== Beltway Campogalliano-Sassuolo ===
The project about the elongation of the A22 heading South, from the junction of Campogalliano to Sassuolo, 14 km long and provided with 6 tollbooths, was approved in 2005 by ANAS Governing Body. The beginning of the work, which was subcontracted to the temporary enterprise association Autocs (made up by Autostrada del Brennero spa, Coopsette, Impresa Pizzarotti & C., Cordioli, Edilizia Wipptal, Oberosler, and Consorzio stabile Coseam Italia), was due in May 2018. Works were to last for four years, at an estimated total cost of 516 million euros.

The executive project provides for the realisation of 25,5 km of road in total, 14 km of which represented by the above-mentioned highway add-on Campogalliano-Sassuolo, 6 km constituting the new Rubiera south bypass (with extra 1,4 km for the joint), and 3,6 km for the joint with Modena ring road. Two viaducts are planned to be built to cross river Secchia (814 m) and to overpass via Emilia and Milano-Bologna railway beam (621 m), and two underground tunnels to shield the natural oasis in Colombarone di Formigine, in addition to 15 underpasses and 12 flyovers for the secondary traffic stream.

=== Ti.Bre. (beltway with A15) ===
Ti.Bre project route

Ti.Bre project (Italian acronym for Tyrrhenian-Brenner) includes the lengthening of highway A15 La Spezia-Parma northbound, from Fontevivo (Parma Ovest) to Nogarole Rocca tollbooth on A22, consisting of 85 km in total.

In March 2017, 12 km out of the 85 km planned were under construction, for a total amount of 2.7 billion euros. The link ends in San Quirico di Trecasali (Parma).

=== Trento and Rovereto urban bypass ===
In order to solve the traffic problems inside the cities of Trento and Rovereto, it is under consideration of the Autonomous Province of Trento the free use of the highway in the sections between the tollbooths of Trento North and South, and Rovereto North and South. In particular, in the city of Rovereto, not being served by its own ring road, often occur long queues and traffic jams, frequently causing delays and accidents. The study provides for the gratuitousness of the segments between the tollbooths just for the citizens who entered and exited at the toll booths at issue. This is preferable due to the elevated construction costs of the potential building of an orbital road around Rovereto, about 200 million euros against about one million euro per year as pledged by the agreement between the Province and A22, and due to the lower environmental and panoramic impact compared to the building of a new ring road.

=== Hydrogen highway ===
A22 was due to be the first "hydrogen highway" all over Europe. By 2010, the motorway was planned to be served by a hydrogen supply system, based upon the California Hydrogen Net (CaH2Net), realised due to the will of the governor of the State of California Arnold Schwarzenegger. Hydrogen, not present in nature in its free form, must be produced by petroleum or by alternative sources; in line with the severe environmental safeguard adopted in the area of Bolzano, the propellant was due to be produced by renewable sources.

After prolonged hesitations by both the province and A22, led respectively by Luis Durnwalder and Silvano Grisenti, in 2013 the works for the realisation of the hydrogen production plant got underway, despite the fact that yet in 2012 no decisions were made.

In summer 2014, the plant was finished, supplying a new fuel station nearby Bolzano South tollbooth, inaugurated at the end of November.

=== Trento Sud toll booth ===
On 3 May 2011 Trento South tollbooth was opened, and it allowed to redirect the traffic circulation on the Trento orbital road whenever the motorway is partially or totally shut down. However, with the opening of Trento South tollbooth, the Trento Central one has been closed outbound.

== See also ==
- Autostrade of Italy
- Roads in Italy
- Transport in Italy

=== Other Italian roads ===
- State highways (Italy)
- Regional road (Italy)
- Provincial road (Italy)
- Municipal road (Italy)
