= Eggental =

Coordinates: 46°26′57″N 11°26′54″E

The Eggental (Italian: Val d'Ega; German: Eggental) is a valley in South Tyrol, Italy.
