= Autostrada del Brennero (company) =

Operator of A22 motorway in Italy

- Native name: Autostrada del Brennero S.p.A.; Brennerautobahn A.G.
- Type: Majority state-owned S.p.A.
- Headquarters: 10 via Berlino, Trento, Italy
- Key people: Luigi Olivieri (President); Walter Pardatscher (CEO)
- Revenue: ▲€350,425,957 (2014)
- Operating income: ▲€73,529,437 (2014)
- Net income: ▲€72,678,886 (2014)
- Total assets: ▲€1,460,015,751 (2014)
- Total equity: ▲€658,494,869 (2014)
- Owner: Trentino - South Tyrol (32.29%); Infrastrutture CIS (7.8275%); South Tyrol (7.63%); Province of Verona (5.51%); Verona (5.51%); Trentino (5.34%); others (43.71%)
- Website: Official website

Autostrada del Brennero S.p.A. (German: Brennerautobahn A.G.) is the operator of the Italian A22 motorway.

== Shareholders ==
As of 31 December 2014

1. Trentino – South Tyrol autonomous region (32.2893%)
2. Autonomous Province of Trentino (7.9326%)
  1. directly (5.3359%)
  2. Cassa del Trentino (2.5967%)
3. Infrastrutture CIS (7.8275%)
4. Autonomous Province of South Tyrol (7.6265%)
5. Province of Verona (5.5128%)
6. Comune of Verona (5.5087%)
7. Province of Modena (4.2410%)
8. Serenissima Partecipazioni (a subsidiary of A4 Holding, A4 Holding is a subsidiary of Abertis) (4.2327%)
9. Comune of Trento (4.2319%)
10. Comune of Bolzano (4.2268%)
11. Province of Mantua (4.2029%)
12. Province of Reggio Emilia (2.5010%)
13. Mantua Chamber of Commerce (2.4970%)
14. Comune of Mantua (2.1159%)
15. Banco Popolare (1.9973%)
16. Verona Chamber of Commerce (1.6972%)
17. Bolzano Chamber of Commerce (0.8414%)
18. Trento Chamber of Commerce (0.3370%)
19. Condotte d'Acqua (0.1000%)

Treasury shares (0.0804%)
