= Milano Serravalle – Milano Tangenziali =

- Native name: Milano Serravalle – Milano Tangenziali S.p.A.
- Company type: majority state-owned società per azioni
- Headquarters: 4/A via del Bosco Rinnovato, Assago, Italy
- Key people: Maura Tina Carta (president); Massimo Sarmi (CEO)
- Services: toll road operator
- Revenue: ▲€253,285,045 (2014)
- Operating income: ▲€46,579,573 (2014)
- Net income: ▲€19,502,586 (2014)
- Total assets: ▼€1,469,416,084 (2014)
- Total equity: ▲€403,840,351 (2014)
- Subsidiaries: Milano Serravalle Engineering (100%); Autostrada Pedemontana Lombarda (78.972%)
- Footnotes / references in consolidated balance sheets

Milano Serravalle – Milano Tangenziali S.p.A. is an Italian transport company. The company owns the concession until 2028 on Milan to Serravalle Scrivia section of Autostrada A7, as well as the concession of the ring roads or bypass road (Italian: Tangenziale and plural Italian: Tangenziali) surrounding Milan (A50, A51 and A52). The company is the holding company (78.972% stake) of Autostrada Pedemontana Lombarda, the operator of A36 (Cassano Magnago to Lentate sul Seveso).

The company also has equity interests in Tangenziali Esterne di Milano, a sub-holding company for the operator of A58 (Milan East Tangenziale; 47.66% stake) and the operator of A15 (Parma to La Spezia; 5.37% stake), as well as Autostrade Lombarde (2.7794% stake), another holding company for the operator of A35 (Provinces of Brescia, Bergamo and Milan).

The company sold the equity interests (4.6671%) in A4 Holding (the operator of Brescia–Padua section of Autostrada A4) to Società delle Autostrade Serenissima in 2014 for €44,151,210. However, until the final payment in 2019, the stake was mandated by Unione Fiduciaria.

== Shareholders ==
As of 31 December 2014

1. Azienda Sviluppo Ambiente e Mobilità (Lombardy region via Finlombarda) (52.902%)
2. Milan Comune (18.600%)
3. Società Iniziative Autostradali e Servizi (10.656%)
4. Province of Pavia (4.189%)
5. Milan Chamber of Commerce (4.000%)
  1. direct (0.000%)
  2. Parcam (4.000%)
6. Province of Como (3.634%)
7. Autostrada dei Fiori (2.884%)
8. Pavia Chamber of Commerce (1.560%)
9. Pavia Comune (0.907%)
10. Genoa Port Authority (Italian: Autorità Portuale di Genova) (0.283%)
11. Como Comune (0.200%)
12. Como Chamber of Commerce (0.127%)
13. ASTM (0.048%)
14. Società Autostrada Torino–Alessandria–Piacenza (0.007%)
15. Province of Lecco (0.003%)
16. Metropolitan City of Milan (0.000%)
