= Campogalliano =

- Comune
- Comune di Campogalliano
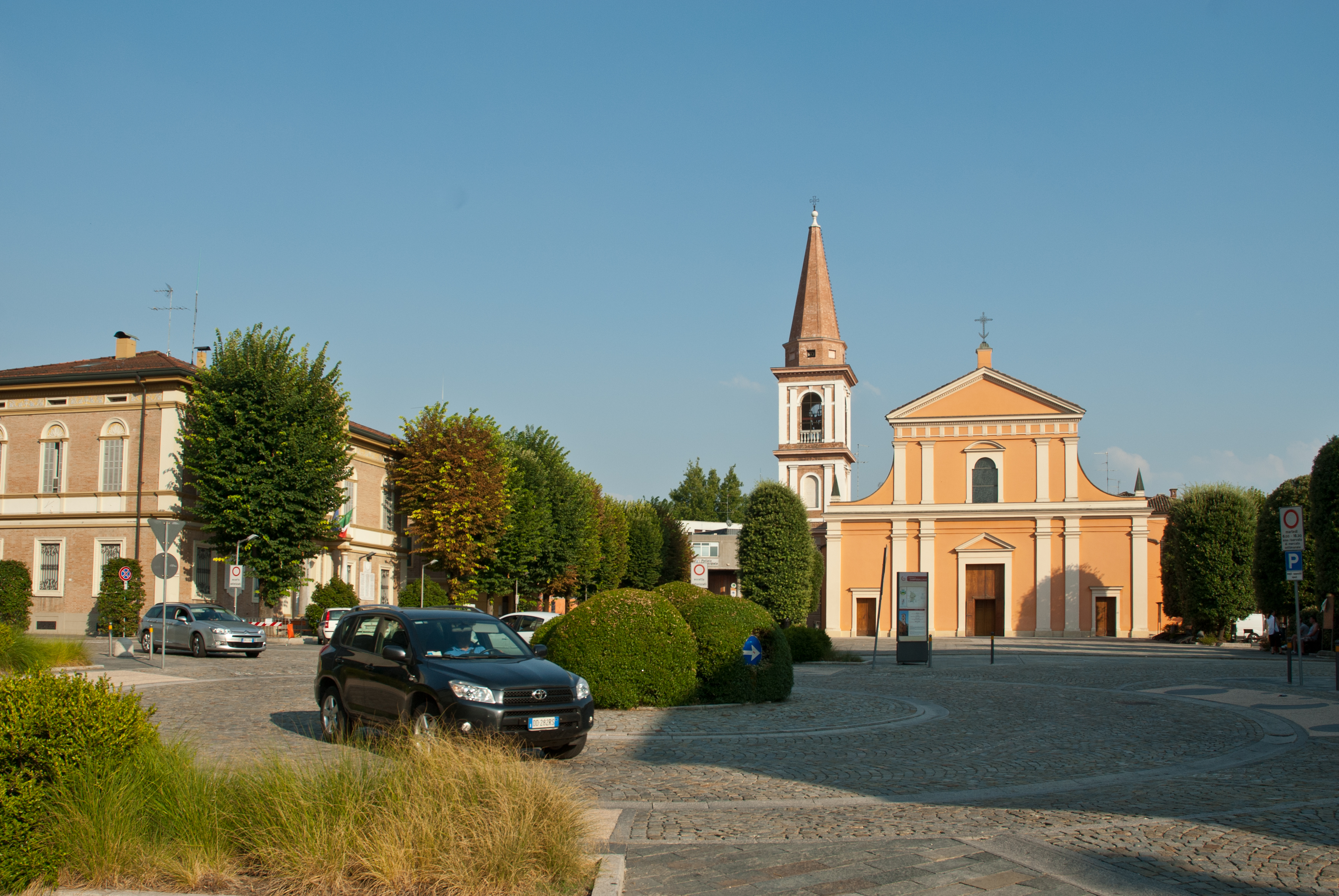

- Location within Italy Location within Emilia-Romagna
- Coordinates: 44°41′N 10°51′E
- Country: Italy
- Region: Emilia-Romagna
- Province: Modena (MO)
- Frazioni: Saliceto Buzzalino, Panzano

Government
  - Mayor: Daniela Tebasti

Area
  - Total: 35.69 km^{2} (13.78 sq mi)
- Elevation: 43 m (141 ft)

Population (30 April 2017)
  - Total: 8,791
  - Density: 246.3/km^{2} (638.0/sq mi)
- Demonym: Campogallianesi
- Time zone: UTC+1 (CET)
  - Summer (DST): UTC+2 (CEST)
- Postal code: 41011
- Dialing code: 059
- Patron saint: St. Ursula
- Saint day: October 21
- Website: Official website

Campogalliano (Carpigiano: Campgàjan) is a comune (municipality) of 8.804 inhabitants in the Province of Modena in the Italian region Emilia-Romagna, located about 45 kilometres (28 mi) northwest of Bologna and about 8 kilometres (5 mi) northwest of Modena.

Campogalliano borders the following municipalities: Carpi, Correggio, Modena, Rubiera, San Martino in Rio.

== History ==
According to some studies, the first traces of settlements in Campogalliano date back to prehistoric age with the arrival of the Gauls into the Po Valley, from which the city was named after the ‘Campo dei Galli’ ('Field of the Gauls'). The Gauls – as a Terramare civilisation – settled nearby the River Secchia, an important river route that flows near the town. The Romans subdued the Celtic local population of Reggio and Modena, and after that, the Galli Boi territory – the Celtic tribe that lived there – was annexed to the Roman province of Cisalpine Gaul, which became its core.

The real first settlement began only in the 16th century, with the construction of Castrum, a castle commissioned by the cadet branch of the House of Este of San Martino then the Lords of Campogalliano, but nowadays there remain no more than the ruins. The castle was supposed to be located in the modern Montagnole park, where the morphological aspect of the land implies the existence of some kind of moat, visible to this day. The channel was mainly used for defensive purpose and there was a bridge that connected the castle with the first settlement, Piazza Castello, where the St. Rocco oratory was built, both still existent. In the same period the Church of St. Ursula was built, patron saint of Campogalliano, on top of the area of an ancient chapel dedicated to her.

Campogalliano was a jurisdiction administered by the San Martino branch of the House of Este from 1501 until the extinction of the household in 1752.

On 12 April 1753, with the Ferrari conveyance deed, the territories of San Martino in Rio and Campogalliano were ceded for a duration of three years by the Camera Ducale d’Este to the marquise Teresa Sfondrati, widow of the last prince of the San Martino branch of the House of Este, Carlo Filiberto II d’Este. In 1756 the contract was renewed in favour of the marquise's daughter Anna Ricciarda, who had married Prince Alberico Barbiano di Belgiojoso the year before. The contract would be renewed again with the Ferrari deed in 1758 and extended until the end of 1767, after which year the territory would definitively return to the Camera Ducale.

During the years of the Second World War, Campogalliano played a key role in the Resistance, as it was a crucial communication route between the partisan lines located in the mountains and those in the Po valley; even nowadays the fallen in the battlefields are still commemorated and the monumento alla Resistenza was also created by Ettore de Conciliis. It was not until the 1980s that the city expanded territorially when the city centre extended beyond the Sant’Orsola oratory.

In 1980 the reservoirs of the River Secchia were built in collaboration with the Municipalities of Rubiera and Modena.

In 2000 construction started of the high-speed railway line that crosses the municipal territory.

== Culture ==
The Museum of Scales and Balances is a technological and industrial museum that exhibits numerous objects for measuring. The museum traces the history of Campogalliano as the city of scales, where those instruments have been produced since 1860.

== Sport ==
The Polisportiva Campogalliano sports centre was founded in 1984, and has been expanded and renovated in recent years also thanks to the restructuring of the stadium. The Polisportiva Campogalliano is engaged on many sports also on a provincial and national level, especially in football where the team plays in second division. Virtus Campogalliano Calcio was founded in 2012, engaged in football league and seven-a-side football. Born from a local group of managers and players, who in the past have worked in the Polisportiva present in the country. Virtus Campogalliano Calcio was promoted to the Italian Serie B (second division), winning the championship in its first season.

== Miscellaneous ==
- An international etymology convention with entomologists from all over Europe took place twice a year in Campogalliano. Due to the consistently high flow of visitors the convention has been moved to the nearest headquarters in the centre of Modena.
- From 1987 the car maker Bugatti Automobili S.p.A. had its headquarters in Campogalliano, but it has been closed for many years due to financial problems. In 1998 Volkswagen acquired the Bugatti brand. Today the name of the company is Bugatti Automobili SAS and its headquarters are in Molsheim, Alsace.
- According to the Catholic Church, the municipal area belongs to two different parishes. The parishes of Campogalliano and Saliceto Buzzalino belong to the Modena-Nonantola archdiocese whereas the parish of Panzano belongs to the Carpi archdiocese.

== Main sights ==
- Santuario della Madonna della Sassola
- Museum of Scales and Balances
- Factory where the Bugatti EB 110 was built is in Campogalliano.
- Sant'Orsola is the parish church.

== Notable people from Campogalliano ==
- Stefano Bonaccini, politician
- Gisleno Santunione, football player
