= Messina =

Messina Missina (Sicilian) Μεσσήνη (Greek)
- Comune
- Comune di Messina
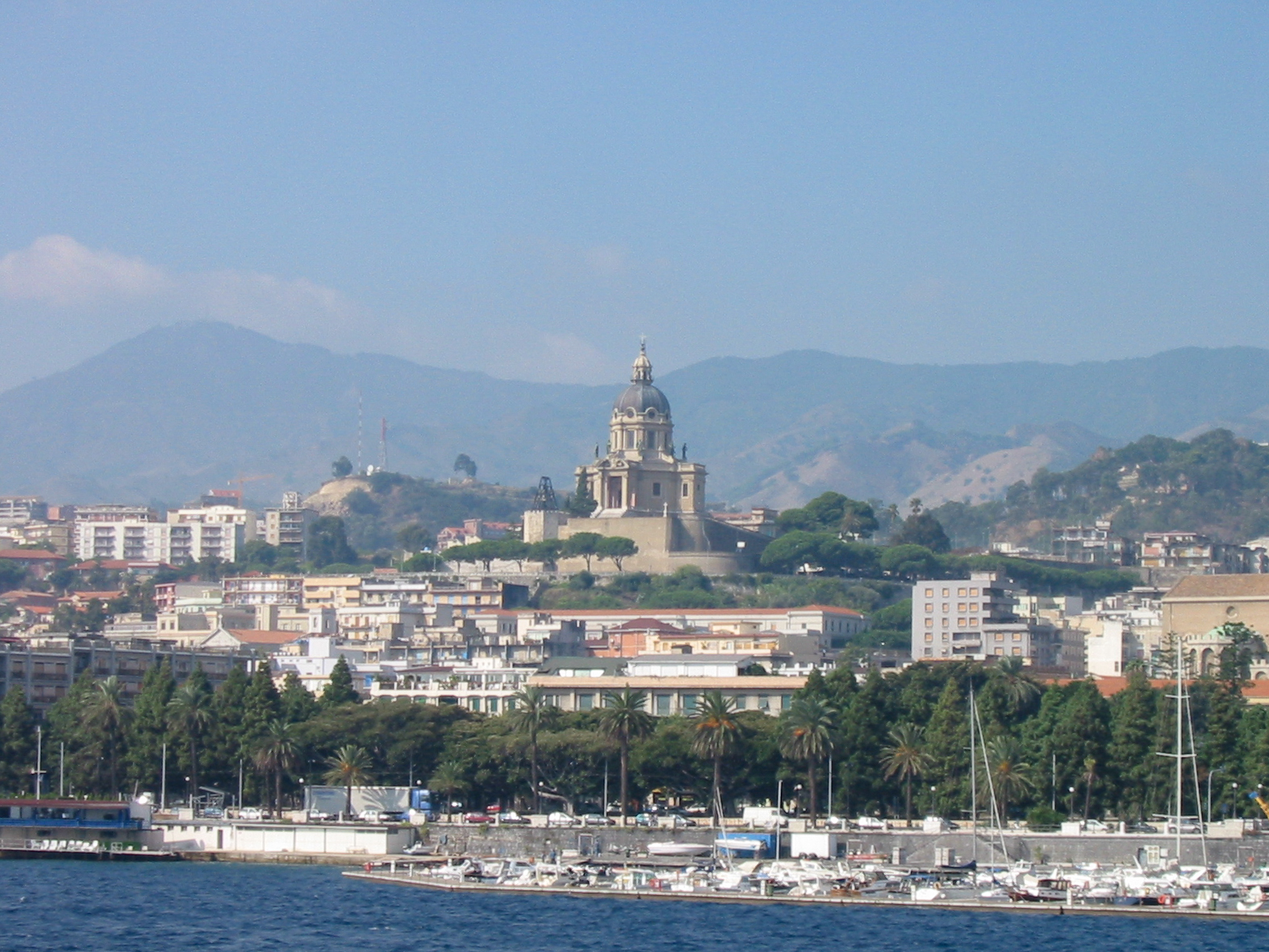
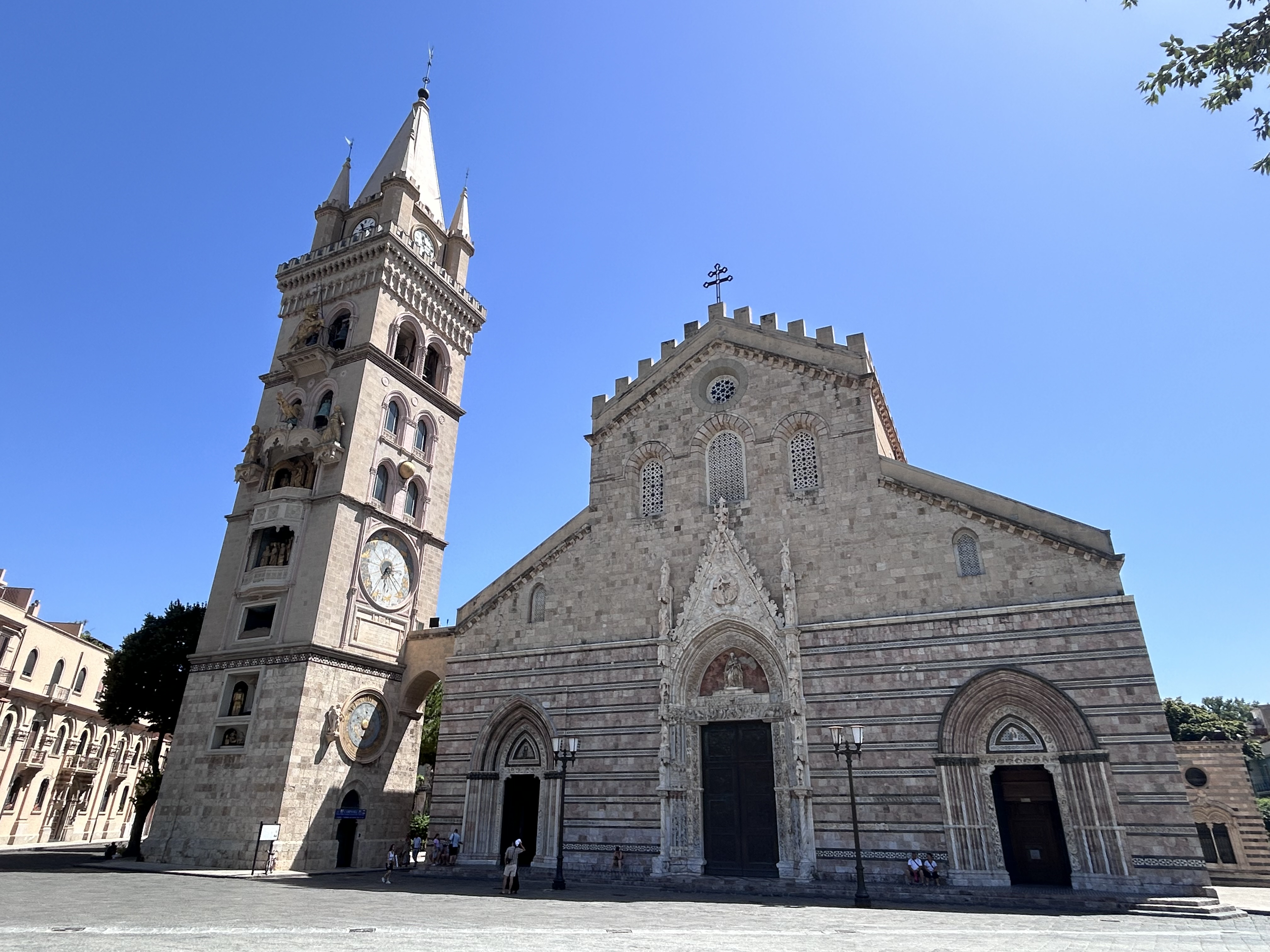
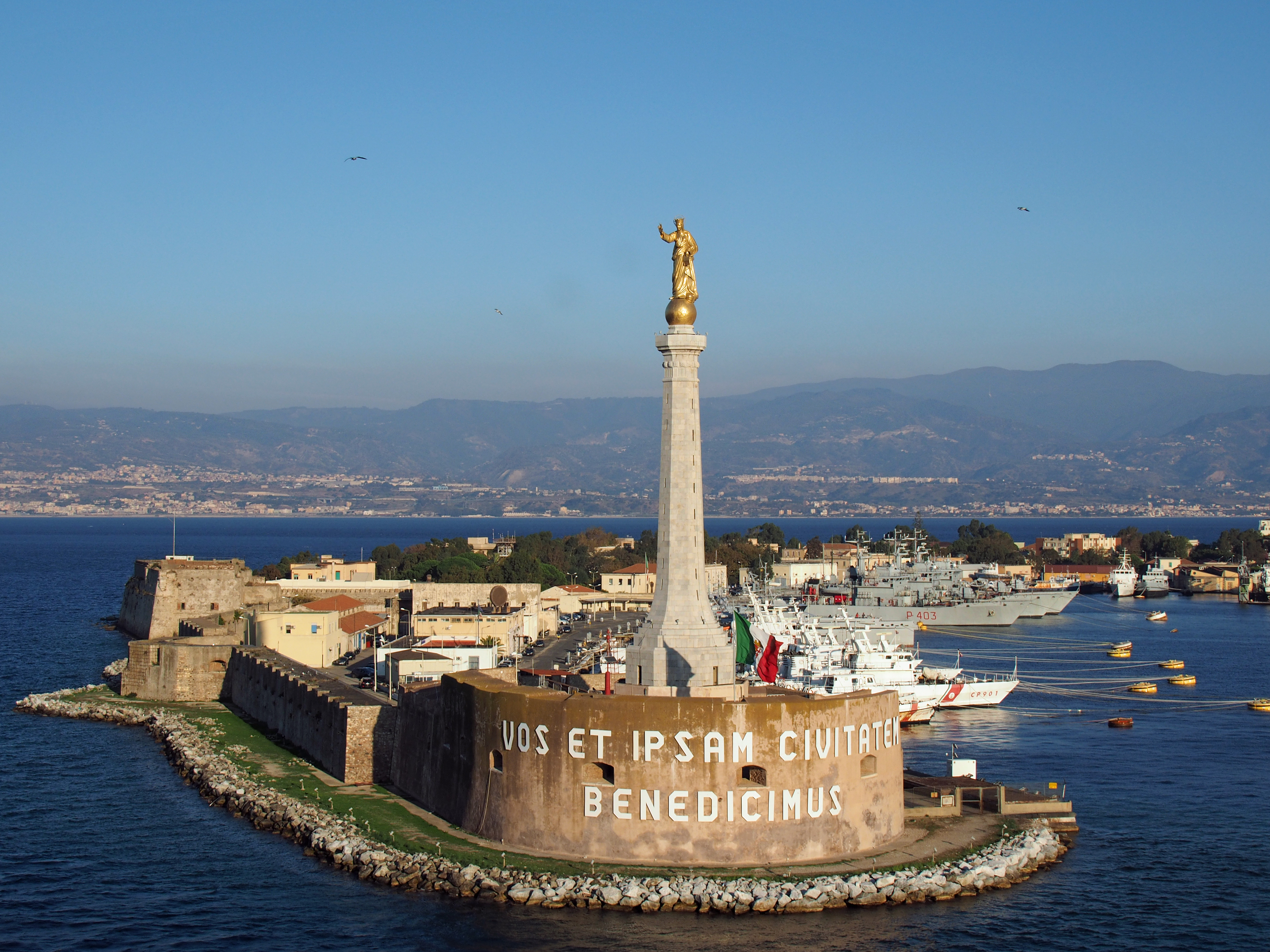
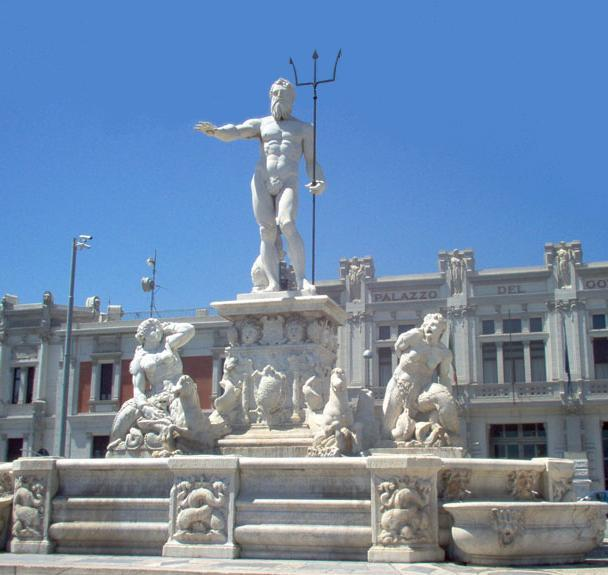
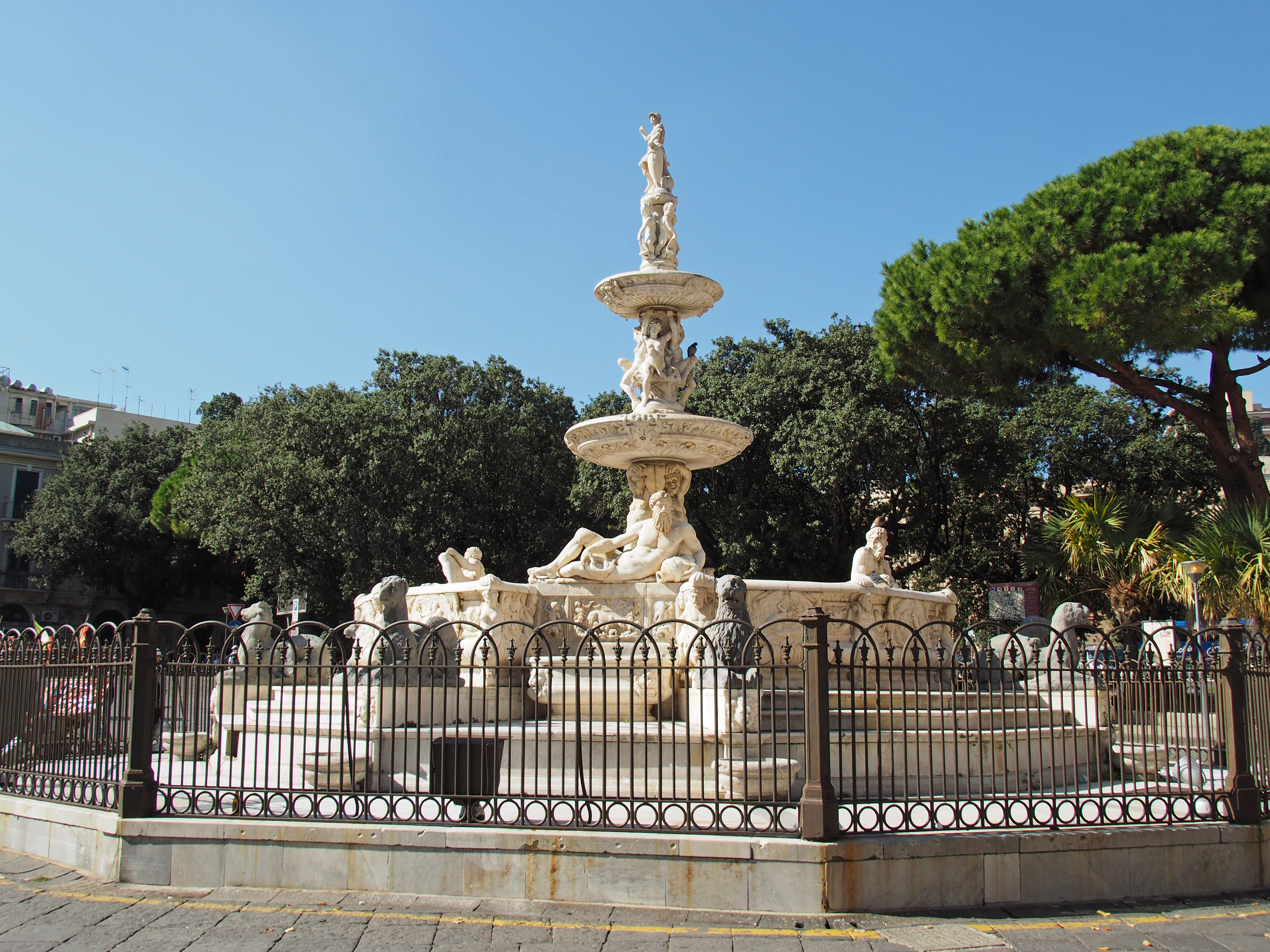
- Skyline of Messina Messina Cathedral Madonna della Lettera Fontana del Nettuno Fontana di Orione

- Flag Coat of arms

- Position of the commune in the Metropolitan City

- Location within Italy Location within Sicily
- Coordinates: 38°11′37″N 15°33′15″E
- Country: Italy
- Region: Sicily
- Metropolitan city: Messina (ME)
- Frazioni: Altolia, Bordonaro, Briga Superiore, Camaro, Castanea delle Furie, Cumia, Giampilieri Superiore, Molino, Rodia, Torre Faro

Government
  - Mayor: Federico Basile

Area
  - Total: 213.75 km^{2} (82.53 sq mi)
- Elevation: 3 m (9.8 ft)

Population (2026)
  - Total: 216,458
  - Density: 1,012.7/km^{2} (2,622.8/sq mi)
- Demonym: Messinese
- Time zone: UTC+1 (CET)
  - Summer (DST): UTC+2 (CEST)
- Postal code: 98100
- Dialing code: 090
- ISTAT code: 083048
- Patron saint: Madonna of the Letter
- Saint day: 3 June
- Website: Official website

Messina (/mɛˈsiːnə/ meh-SEE-nə, US also /mɪˈ-/ mih-; Italian: [mesˈsiːna]) (Note: Sicilian: Missina [mɪsˈsiːna]; Greek: Μεσσήνη); Latin: Messana; Ancient Greek: Μεσσήνη, romanized: Messḗnē.) is a harbor city and the capital of the Metropolitan City of Messina in the autonomous island region of Sicily in Italy. It is the third largest city on the island of Sicily, and the 13th largest city in Italy, with a population of 216,458 inhabitants in the city proper and 594,074 in the metropolitan city as of 2026. It is located near the northeast corner of Sicily, at the Strait of Messina and it is an important access terminal to the Calabria region on the mainland, namely the town of Villa San Giovanni and the city of Reggio Calabria.

Founded by the Sicels with the name of Zancle in 757 BC, which in their language meant sickle, it was repopulated by Greek colonists of Magna Graecia and renamed Messana. The city was renamed Messina in the Byzantine period. It was a major Roman city that contracted under the Byzantine and Arab rule to rise sharply in importance during the Norman era. It reached the height of its prosperity between the late Middle Ages and the mid-17th century, when it competed with Palermo for the role of capital of the Kingdom of Sicily.

Put to fire and sword in 1678 after a historic anti-Spanish revolt that led to the annihilation of its ruling class, it was seriously damaged by an earthquake in 1783. In 1908, another earthquake destroyed the city almost entirely, causing the death of about half the population. Rebuilding started in 1912, largely in the Liberty style, and an orderly and regular network of wide and straight streets in a north-south direction were built. Being a strategic target, the city of the strait was heavily bombed by the Allies of World War II in 1943 during the landing in Sicily, being hit by about 6,500 tons of explosives in about 2,800 air raids and four naval bombardments. This event earned the city the Gold Medal of Military Valor. Winston Churchill visited Messina after the bombing. He came to the city in July 1943, during the time when the Allies were executing the invasion of Sicily.

Its port, for thousands of years has been one of the main commercial crossroads of the Mediterranean and only recently becoming a port of call for ferries to the continent, is the first in Italy in terms of the number of passengers in transit. According to Eurostat the FUA of the metropolitan area of Messina has, in 2014, 277,584 inhabitants. The city has been a Roman Catholic Archdiocese and Archimandrite seat since 1548 and is home to the University of Messina.

== Names ==
- Zancle, which Thucydides said was from a Siculian word meaning "scythe", because of the shape of the natural port, from the founding of the city by the Sicels in 757 BC up to the Magna Graecia age;
- Dankle (Ζάγκλης), from the Greek ζάγκλον meaning "scythe" in the Magna Graecia age up to Anaxilas of Rhegium;
- Messene (Μεσσήνη), a name that was given to the city in the Magna Graecia age by Anaxilas of Rhegium, when he settled refugees from Messenia there at the beginning of the 5th century BC;
- Messana, in the Roman age;
- Messina, from the Byzantine age up to modern times.

== History ==
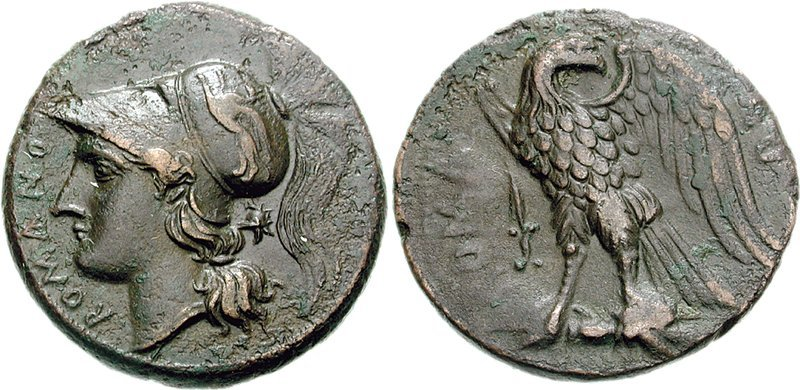
Ancient Roman bronze coin minted in Messina, 264 BC

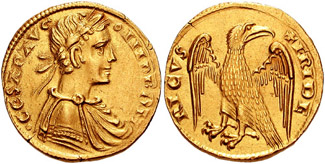
13th-century coins minted during the reign of Frederick II, Holy Roman Emperor, in Messina.

Founded by Greek colonists of Magna Graecia in the 8th century BC, Messina was originally called Zancle (Ancient Greek: Ζάγκλη), from the Greek ζάγκλον meaning "scythe" because of the shape of its natural harbour (though a legend attributes the name to King Zanclus). A comune of its Metropolitan City, located at the southern entrance of the Strait of Messina, is to this day called 'Scaletta Zanclea'. Solinus wrote that the city of Metauros was established by people from Zancle.

In the early 5th century BC Anaxilas of Rhegium renamed it Messene (Μεσσήνη) in honour of the Greek city Messene (See also List of traditional Greek place names). Later, Micythus was the ruler of Rhegium and Zancle, and he also founded the city of Pyxus. The city was sacked in 397 BC by the Carthaginians and then reconquered by Dionysius I of Syracuse.

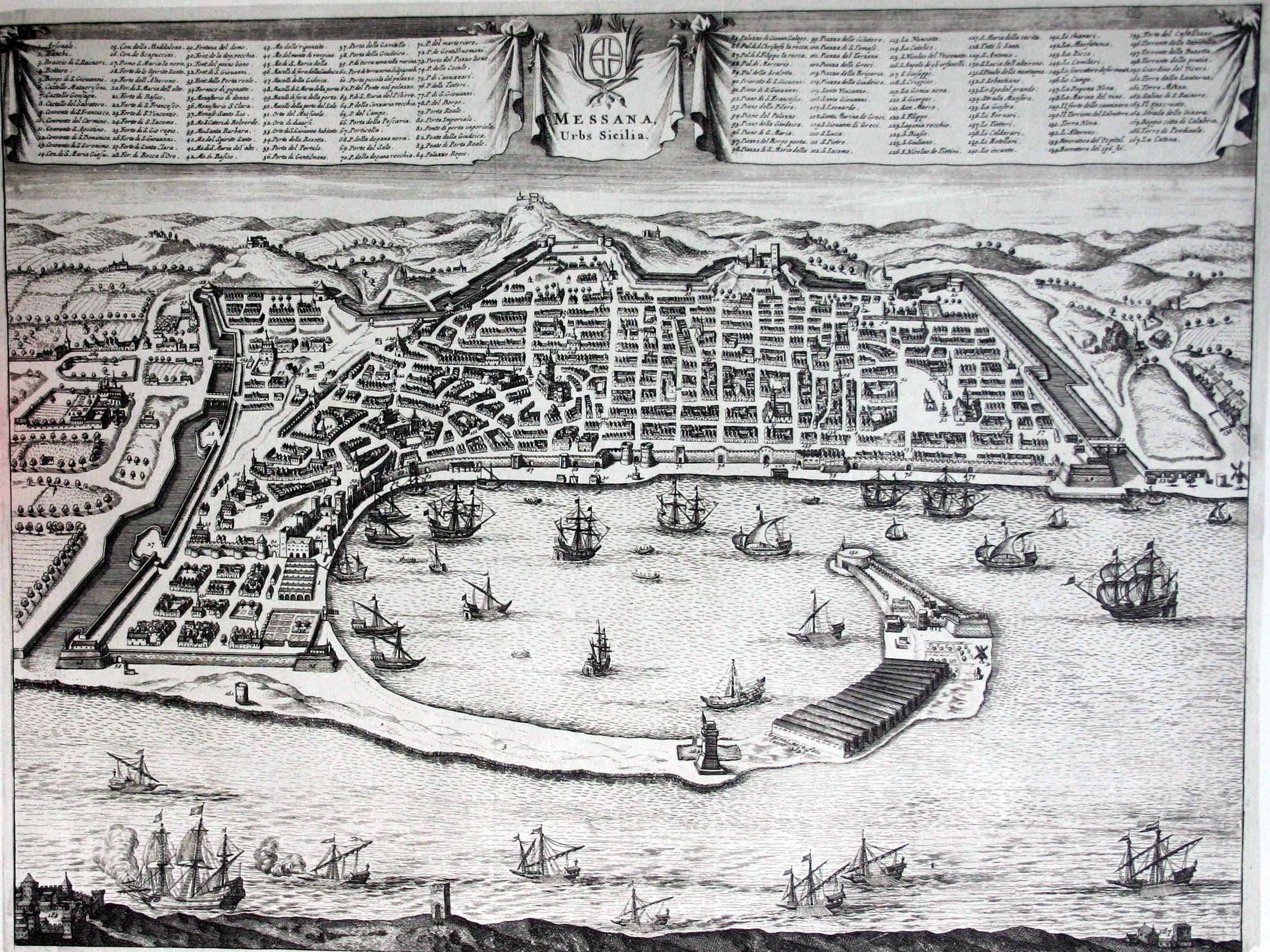
17th century map of Messina

In 288 BC the Mamertines seized the city by treachery, killing all the men and taking the women as their wives. The city became a base from which they ravaged the countryside, leading to a conflict with the expanding regional empire of Syracuse. Hiero II, tyrant of Syracuse, defeated the Mamertines near Mylae on the Longanus River and besieged Messina. Carthage assisted the Mamertines because of a long-standing conflict with Syracuse over dominance in Sicily. When Hiero attacked a second time in 264 BC, the Mamertines petitioned the Roman Republic for an alliance, hoping for more reliable protection. Although initially reluctant to assist lest it encourage other mercenary groups to mutiny, Rome was unwilling to see Carthaginian power spread further over Sicily and encroach on Italy. Rome, therefore, entered into an alliance with the Mamertines. In 264 BC, Roman troops were deployed to Sicily, the first time a Roman army acted outside the Italian Peninsula. At the end of the First Punic War it was a free city allied with Rome. In Roman times Messina, then known as Messana, had an important pharos (lighthouse). Messana was the base of Sextus Pompeius, during his war against Octavian.

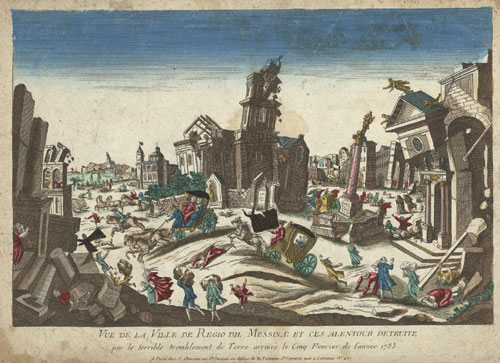
1783 Messina earthquake

After the fall of the Western Roman Empire in 476 the city was successively ruled by Vandals and Ostrogoths, then by the Byzantine Empire from 535 (with a final siege by the Ostrogoth king Totila in 548), by the Aghlabids from September 843, by the Fatimids from 909, by the Byzantines again from 1038 (with previous brief conquests in 964 and before 976), and from October 1060 by the Normans (brothers Robert and Roger Guiscard and their successors). Under Byzantine rule, Messina became fragmented into a constellation of villages. The shift from the Church of Rome to the Patriarchate of Constantinople around 737 saw the expansion of Eastern Christian monasticism in the area. In the Islamic period, in particular from 877, the city was reduced to a military outpost against Byzantine Rometta and Calabria, although high-brow Fatimid architecture may also have existed. Messina was reconquered by the Byzantines in 1038 and successfully defended against the Arabs in 1041. Refortified by Roger I after 1081, the city grew quickly as a hub of Mediterranean trade during the twelfth century and became Sicily's second port (after Palermo), with a shipyard and Genoese, Pisan, Amalfitan and Egyptian commercial presence. It was briefly the seat of royal government during the regency of Adelaide del Vasto from 1101 to 1111. In 1131 Messina became a metropolitan see through a papal decision confirmed in 1166. In 1168 the Greek and Latin citizens lynched a governor, and in 1169 the city was hit by a major earthquake. In 1189 the English king Richard I ("The Lionheart") stopped at Messina en route to the Holy Land for the Third Crusade and briefly occupied the city after a dispute over the dowry of his sister, who had been married to William the Good, King of Sicily. Richard built a provisional castle named Mategriffon, later replaced in stone by Emperor Frederick II, who also established the mint for Sicily and Calabria at Messina. Under the Angevin rule, the admirals of the kingdom of Sicily had their residence in the city, as did Roger de Lauria after 1283. During the thirteenth century, the glazed cooking pots manufactured in Messina spread all across the island, as evidence of new consumption patterns. The city built up territorial influence: by 1199 it controlled Randazzo as a source of timber, by 1302 the plain of Milazzo with its grain output, and later also Castrogiovanni.

In 1277, Messina counted at least 30,000 inhabitants. One of the major cities on Sicily, Messina was heavily involved in the rivalry between the Anjou dynasty in Naples and the Aragonese House of Barcelona. Initially a stronghold of Angevin support on Sicily, by the end of April 1282 the city joined the revolt of the Sicilian Vespers and elected Alaimo da Lentini as captain of the commune, resulting in the city being subjected to a major siege by Charles I of Anjou. Messina remained a major naval base for the remainder of the ensuing twenty-year War of the Sicilian Vespers, and was besieged a second time in 1301. In 1303, the Catalan Company set sail from Messina to Constantinople. Despite the resumption of the Sicilian–Angevin conflict in the fourteenth century, the city continued to rely on the now hostile Calabria for its grain supply.

In the reign of Frederick III, the royal court met regularly in the city, and from 1321 onwards Messina was the de facto capital of the Kingdom of Trinacria on account of the ruler's permanent residence in the area. In 1345 Orlando d'Aragona, Frederick's illegitimate son, was the strategos of Messina.

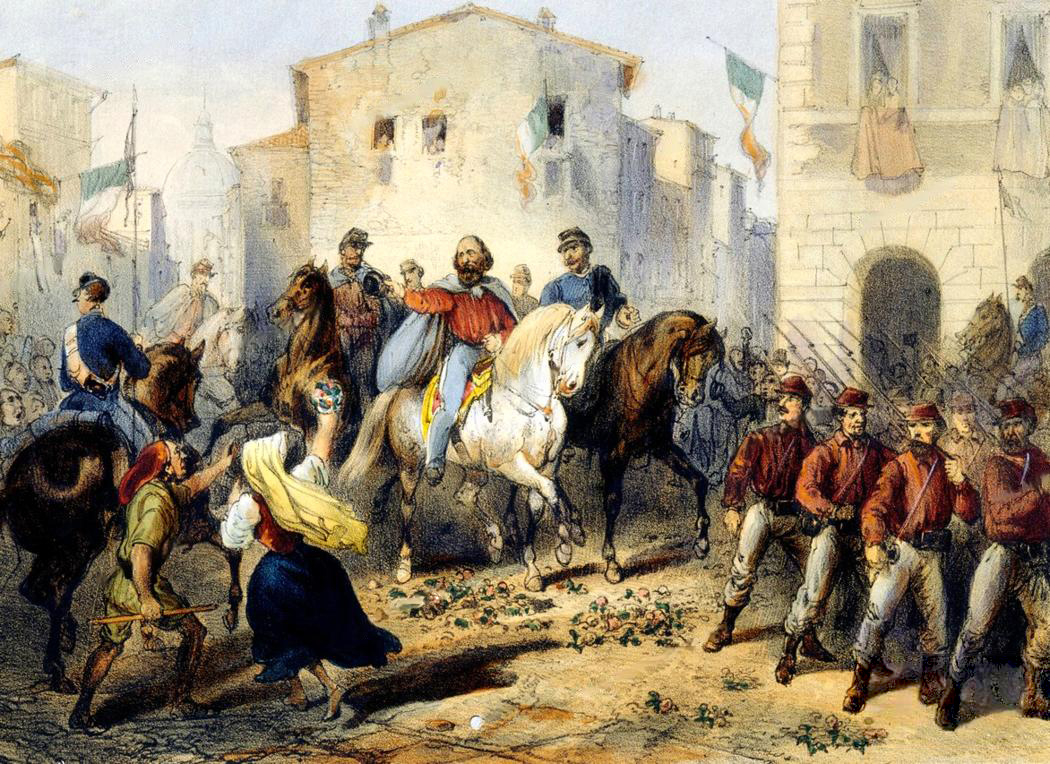
Giuseppe Garibaldi's entry into Messina during the Expedition of the Thousand in 1860, an event of the unification of Italy

In 1347 Messina was one of the first points of entry for the black death into Western Europe. Genoese galleys travelling from the infected city of Kaffa carried plague into the Messina ports. Kaffa had been infected via Asian trade routes and the siege of Kaffa from infected Mongol armies led by Janibeg; it was a departure point for many Italian merchants who fled the city to Sicily. Contemporary accounts from Messina tell of the arrival of "Death Ships" from the East, which floated to shore with all the passengers on board already dead or dying of plague. Plague-infected rats probably also came aboard these ships. The black death ravaged Messina and rapidly spread northward into mainland Italy from Sicily in the following few months.

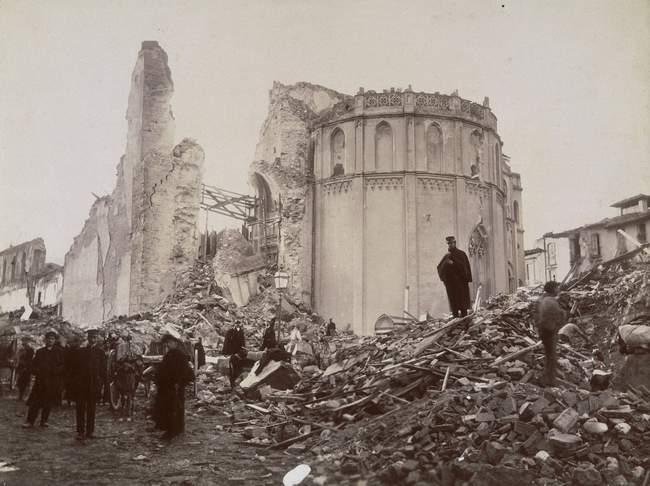
An image of the 1908 Messina earthquake aftermath. Ruins of the Duomo.

In 1548 St. Ignatius founded there the first Jesuit college in the world, which later gave birth to the Studium Generale (the current University of Messina). The Christian ships that won the Battle of Lepanto (1571) left from Messina: the Spanish author Miguel de Cervantes, who took part in the battle, recovered for some time in the Grand Hospital. The city reached the peak of its splendour in the early 17th century, under Spanish domination: at the time it was one of the ten greatest cities in Europe.

Greek minority of Messina flag

In 1674 the city rebelled against the foreign garrison. It managed to remain independent for some time, thanks to the help of the French king Louis XIV, but in 1678, with the Peace of Nijmegen, it was reconquered by the Spaniards and sacked: the university, the senate and all the privileges of autonomy it had enjoyed since the Roman times were abolished. A massive fortress was built by the occupants and Messina decayed steadily. In 1743, 48,000 died of a second wave of plague in the city.

On 5 February 1783 an earthquake devastated much of the city, and it took decades to rebuild and rekindle the cultural life of Messina. In 1847 it was one of the first cities in Italy where Risorgimento riots broke out. In 1848 it rebelled openly against the reigning Bourbons, but was heavily suppressed again. Only in 1860, after the Battle of Milazzo, the Garibaldine troops occupied the city. One of the main figures of the unification of Italy, Giuseppe Mazzini, was elected deputy at Messina in the general elections of 1866. Another earthquake of less intensity damaged the city on 16 November 1894. The city was almost entirely destroyed by an earthquake and associated tsunami on the morning of 28 December 1908, killing about 100,000 people and destroying most of the ancient architecture. The city was largely rebuilt in the following year. However, thousands of residents displaced by the earthquake lived in shanty towns outside the city until the late 1930s, when further reconstruction finally commenced.

It incurred further damage from the massive Allied air bombardments of 1943; before and during the Allied invasion of Sicily. Messina, owing to its strategic importance as a transit point for Axis troops and supplies sent to Sicily from mainland Italy, was a prime target for the British and American air forces, which dropped some 6,500 tons of bombs in the span of a few months. These raids destroyed one-third of the city, and caused 854 deaths among the population. The city was awarded a Gold Medal of Military Valor and one for Civil Valor by the Italian government in memory of the event and the subsequent effort of reconstruction.

In June 1955 Messina was the location of the Messina Conference of Western European foreign ministers which led to the creation of the European Economic Community. The conference was held mainly in Messina's City Hall building (it), and partly in nearby Taormina. In November 2004 the city witnessed the Messina Declaration of Italian universities on open access to scientific knowledge.

The city is home to a small Greek-speaking minority, which arrived from the Peloponnese between 1533 and 1534 when fleeing the expansion of the Ottoman Empire. They were officially recognised in 2012.

== Geography ==
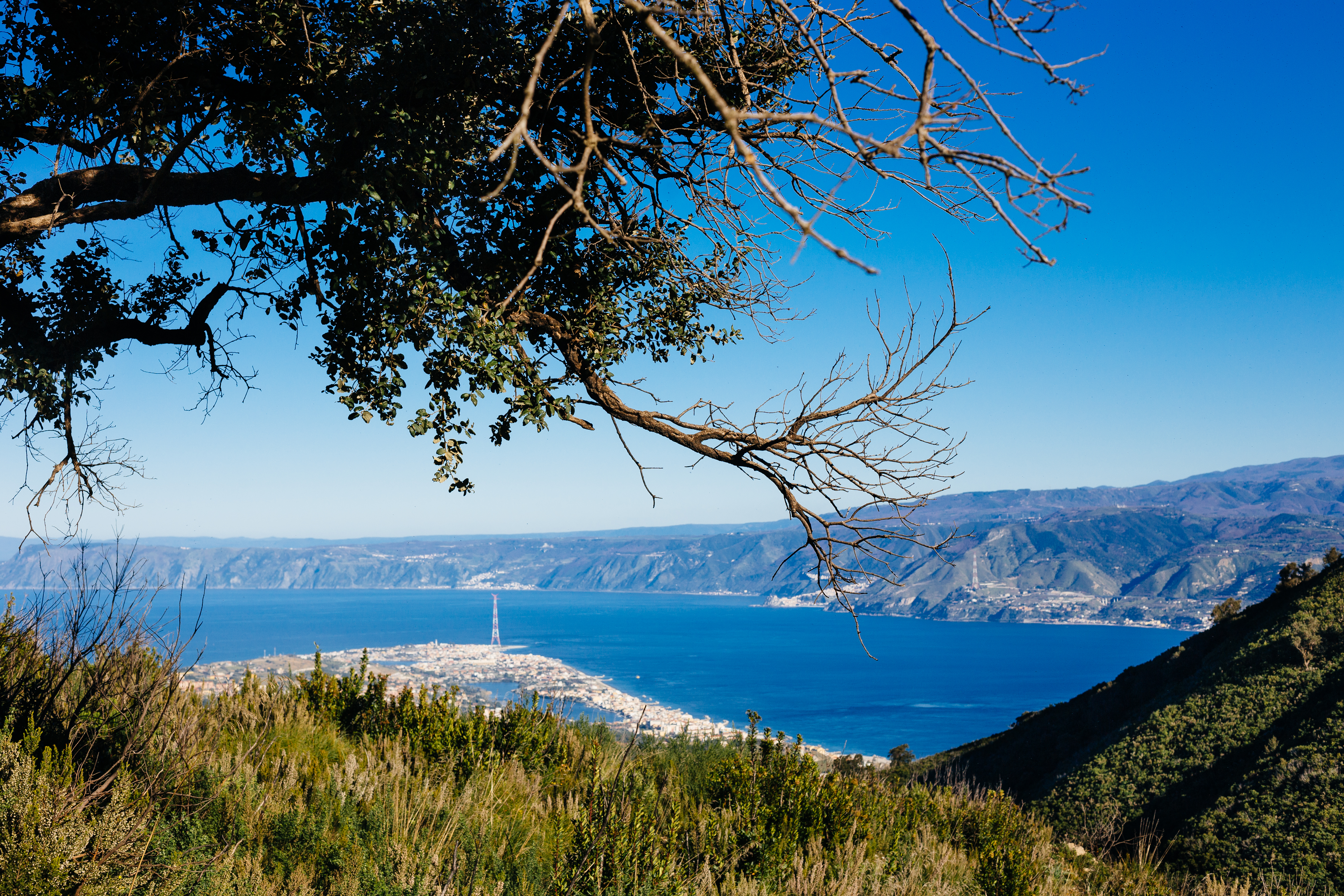
Natural Reserve Capo Peloro

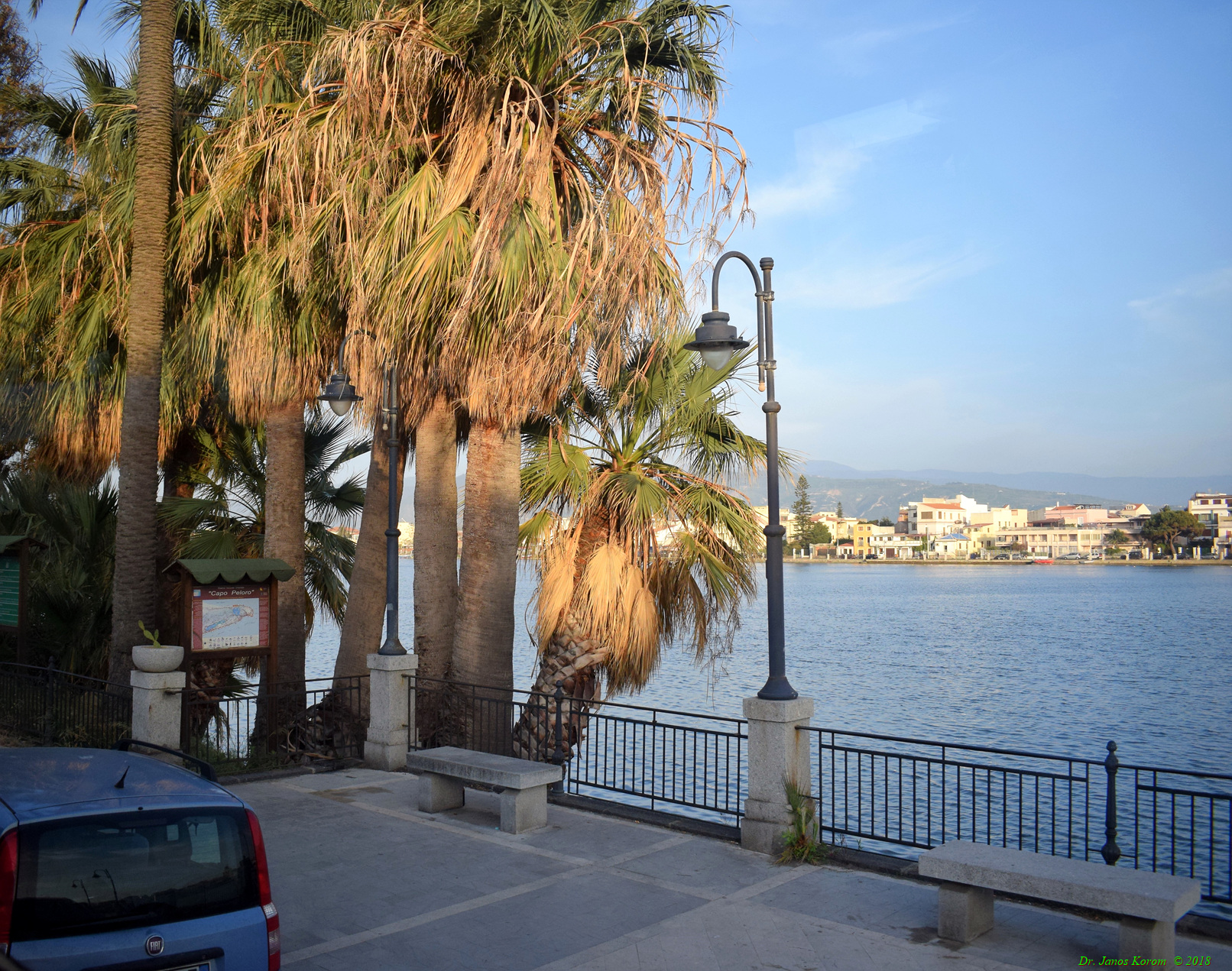
Lake Ganzirri

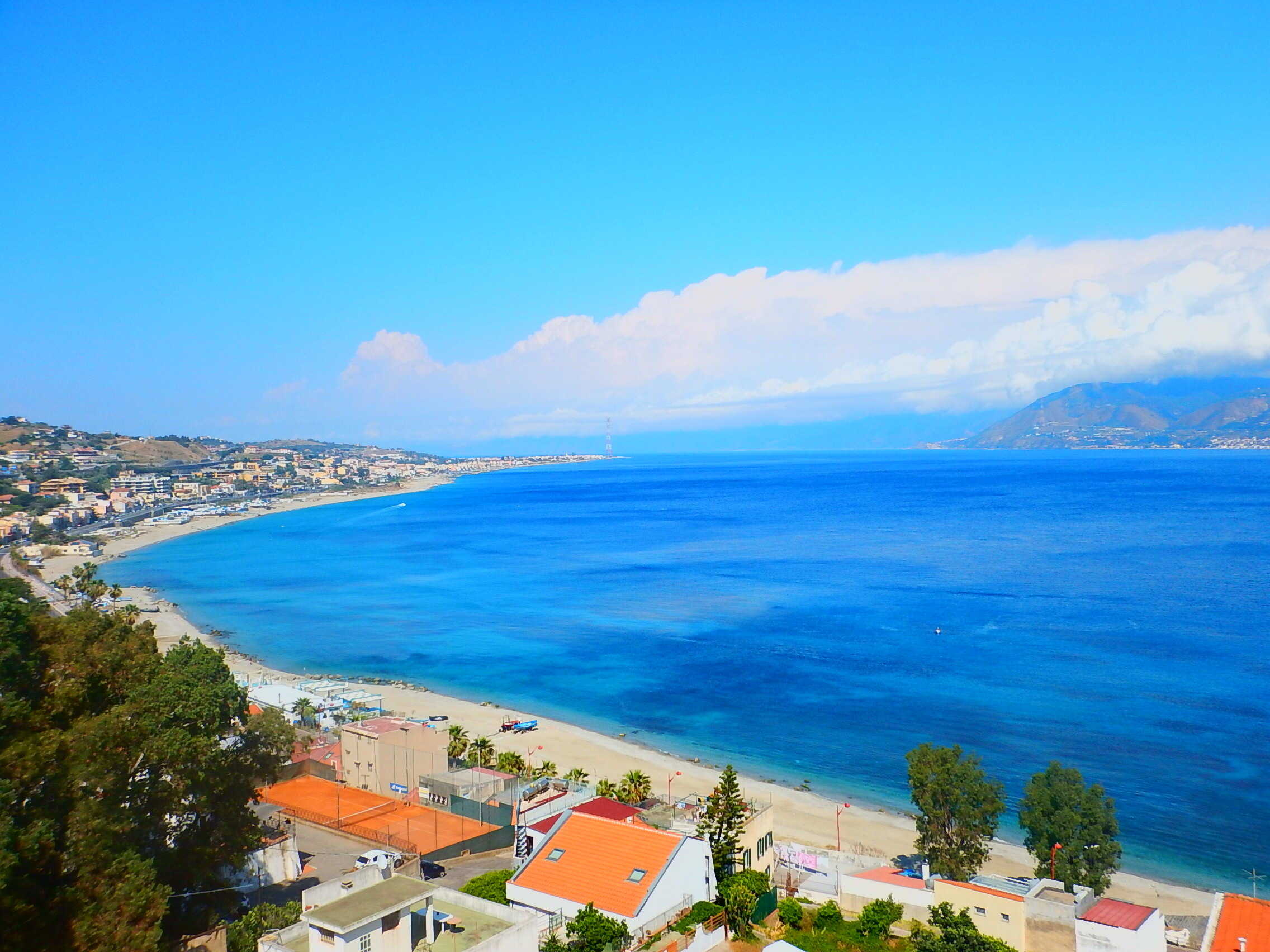
A tract of around 30 km (19 mi) of beaches of Messina

Located in the north-eastern corner of Sicily, on the western shore of the Strait of Messina (Ionian Sea)— altitude 3 m (9.8 ft) above sea level— it extends for 213.75 km^{2} (82.53 sq mi) of municipal surface. Its extension on the coast (56 km (35 mi) from the coast of Giampilieri to the south to that of Orto Liuzzo to the north), which makes it the "longest" and most maritime city in Italy.

The municipality is located 96 km (60 mi) from Catania and 223 km (139 mi) from Palermo, squeezed between the Ionian and Tyrrhenian coasts and the Peloritani mountains, it overlooks with its large natural, military and commercial port, closed by the sickle-shaped peninsula of San Raineri, in front of Villa San Giovanni and a little further north than Reggio Calabria. Cape Peloro, in the northern part of the city, is instead opposite Scylla. In these waters is located the myth of Scylla and Charybdis, whose whirlpools are compared to the punishment of the souls of hell that go round and round and collide eternally ("qui la gente riddi" in Sicilian).

As the wave over Charybdis, / that breaks with the one it bumps into, / so must people laugh here.

— (Dante Alighieri, Divine Comedy, Canto VII of the Inferno.

An era of the Neogene, a fraction of the upper Miocene, a period known as the one in which the Mediterranean increased its salinity following the closing of the Strait of Gibraltar, takes the name of Messinian from the discovery in Messina of its characteristic rocks, the evaporites.

From sea level, within the same municipality, it is possible to climb up to 1,127 m (3,698 ft) above sea level, via the hills overlooking the city, to Mount Dinnammare, from the Latin "bimaris", two seas. From here the view extends over the two seas of the city, the Ionian, the Strait of Messina and the Tyrrhenian. To the east, the entire city of Messina can be seen, while across the sea Calabria from its southernmost point to Capo Vaticano, in the province of Vibo Valentia. To the south, the imposing view of Mount Etna is clearly visible. To the northwest, the Aeolian Islands and the Tyrrhenian coast with Capo Milazzo, Capo Tindari and Capo Calavà in Gioiosa Marea.

The city develops mainly in a longitudinal direction along the coast of the strait without interruption from Giampilieri Marina to Capo Peloro for 32 km (20 mi) in the Ionian strip. The Tyrrhenian strip, 24 km (15 mi) long, extends from Capo Peloro to Ponte Gallo. The central urban area, which can be enclosed between the Annunziata and San Filippo streams, now covered by the road surface, is about 12 km (7.5 mi) long, with little inclination towards the west due to the hilly buttresses of the Peloritani, which prevent the development of a large geometric urban network in that direction. The extreme proximity of the mountains gives the western part of the city a certain slope, overcome with steps and crossed by the panoramic ring road located upstream. There are numerous "urban intrusions" towards the interior, corresponding to the short plains of the streams, which tend to incorporate as districts some of the oldest farmhouses in the city territory, the so-called "Villaggi", currently 48.

=== Climate ===
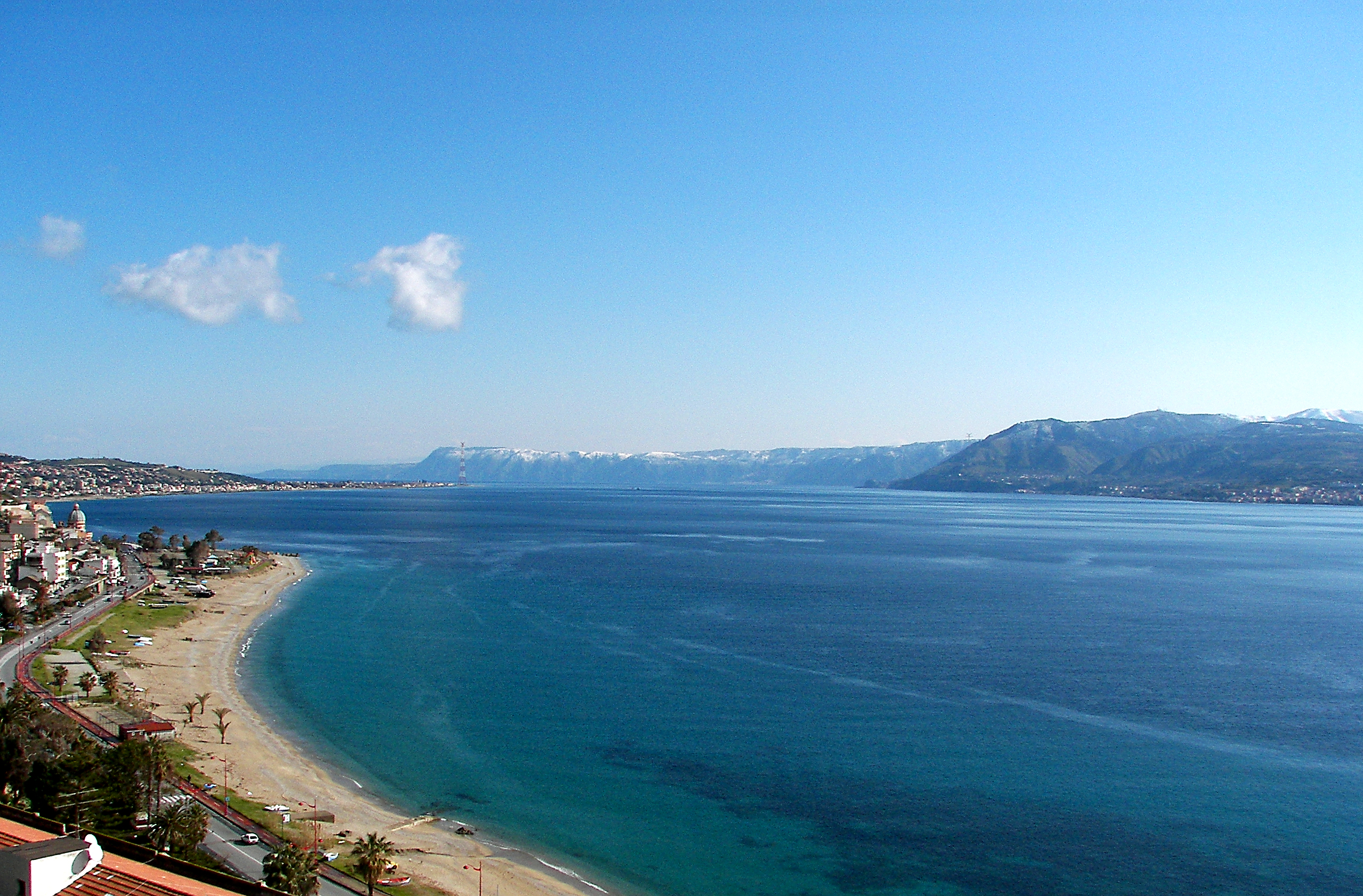
The Strait of Messina, seen from the northern area of the city

Messina has a subtropical Mediterranean climate with long, hot summers with low diurnal temperature variation and consistently dry weather. In winter, Messina is rather wet and mild. Diurnals remain low and remain averaging above 10 °C (50 °F) lows even during winter. It is rather rainier than Reggio Calabria on the other side of the Messina Strait, a remarkable climatic difference for such a small distance.

The winter, short, presents rare episodes of cold that in rare cases can also bring snow in the hinterland of the city. The last snowy episode occurred on 7 January 2017, preceded by the event of 31 December 2014 and even before that by that of 30 January 1999.

The summer, hot, but due to the sea breezes, is not particularly muggy. The average humidity value tends to be lower during the hottest hours of the day. Furthermore, the presence of the sea tends to contain the maximum temperature values; only in the presence of southern winds (during the major heat waves) do reach 40 °C (104 °F), and in these cases the humidity levels are very high, reaching over 80%.

Precipitation is consistent as Messina is among the medium-large municipalities of the island, the rainiest coastal city in Sicily. An average annual rainfall of 846.9 mm (33.34 in) places the city of the strait above the Italian average. Precipitation is concentrated mainly between autumn and winter but in the summer season there are some thunderstorms. The abundant rainfall in Messina derives from various factors and in particular from the relatively high reliefs close to the area on which the city stands, in Sicily the eastern Nebrodi and the Peloritani, in Calabria the Aspromonte, reliefs that cause frequent orographic lift phenomena and the presence of two seas, the Ionian and the Tyrrhenian, which create frequent conditions favorable to precipitation.

Climate data for Messina, elevation: 59 m or 194 ft, 1991–2020 normals, extremes 1909–present
Month	Jan	Feb	Mar	Apr	May	Jun	Jul	Aug	Sep	Oct	Nov	Dec	Year
Record high °C (°F)	24.6 (76.3)	25.8 (78.4)	32.0 (89.6)	29.6 (85.3)	33.6 (92.5)	43.4 (110.1)	43.6 (110.5)	41.8 (107.2)	40.5 (104.9)	36.4 (97.5)	29.2 (84.6)	26.6 (79.9)	43.6 (110.5)
Mean daily maximum °C (°F)	14.8 (58.6)	15.0 (59.0)	16.9 (62.4)	19.4 (66.9)	23.4 (74.1)	27.8 (82.0)	30.9 (87.6)	31.4 (88.5)	27.8 (82.0)	24.0 (75.2)	19.8 (67.6)	16.2 (61.2)	22.3 (72.1)
Daily mean °C (°F)	12.4 (54.3)	12.3 (54.1)	14.0 (57.2)	16.2 (61.2)	20.0 (68.0)	24.2 (75.6)	27.2 (81.0)	27.8 (82.0)	24.4 (75.9)	20.9 (69.6)	17.1 (62.8)	13.7 (56.7)	19.2 (66.6)
Mean daily minimum °C (°F)	10.1 (50.2)	9.7 (49.5)	11.3 (52.3)	13.3 (55.9)	16.9 (62.4)	21.1 (70.0)	24.0 (75.2)	24.7 (76.5)	21.4 (70.5)	18.3 (64.9)	14.6 (58.3)	11.4 (52.5)	16.4 (61.5)
Record low °C (°F)	0.2 (32.4)	−0.1 (31.8)	−0.2 (31.6)	4.3 (39.7)	7.5 (45.5)	12.4 (54.3)	15.3 (59.5)	14.4 (57.9)	12.5 (54.5)	7.5 (45.5)	5.1 (41.2)	0.8 (33.4)	−0.2 (31.6)
Average precipitation mm (inches)	118.5 (4.67)	92.4 (3.64)	94.0 (3.70)	65.5 (2.58)	37.1 (1.46)	32.1 (1.26)	19.8 (0.78)	29.9 (1.18)	91.8 (3.61)	114.1 (4.49)	126.9 (5.00)	127.3 (5.01)	949.3 (37.37)
Average precipitation days (≥ 1.0 mm)	10.9	9.9	8.9	6.9	4.3	2.8	2.0	2.3	7.4	7.9	10.7	11.7	85.8
Average relative humidity (%)	74.1	71.9	71.3	70.9	69.1	68.3	68.1	68.8	71.4	73.9	74.7	74.0	71.4
Average dew point °C (°F)	7.6 (45.7)	6.7 (44.1)	8.1 (46.6)	10.1 (50.2)	13.2 (55.8)	15.8 (60.4)	19.5 (67.1)	20.7 (69.3)	18.5 (65.3)	15.8 (60.4)	12.0 (53.6)	8.9 (48.0)	13.1 (55.5)
Mean monthly sunshine hours	142.6	153.2	207.7	222.0	277.5	300.0	334.2	314.0	231.9	199.0	150.9	126.5	2,659.5
Source 1: NOAA, (Dew point for 1981-2010)
Source 2: Temperature estreme in Toscana

== Demographics ==
Historical population
Year	Pop.	±%
1861	104,036	—
1871	112,512	+8.1%
1881	126,776	+12.7%
1901	147,589	+16.4%
1911	128,121	−13.2%
1921	177,196	+38.3%
1931	179,914	+1.5%
1936	191,966	+6.7%
1951	220,590	+14.9%
1961	254,538	+15.4%
1971	250,519	−1.6%
1981	260,118	+3.8%
1991	231,693	−10.9%
2001	252,026	+8.8%
2011	243,262	−3.5%
2021	221,246	−9.1%
Source: ISTAT

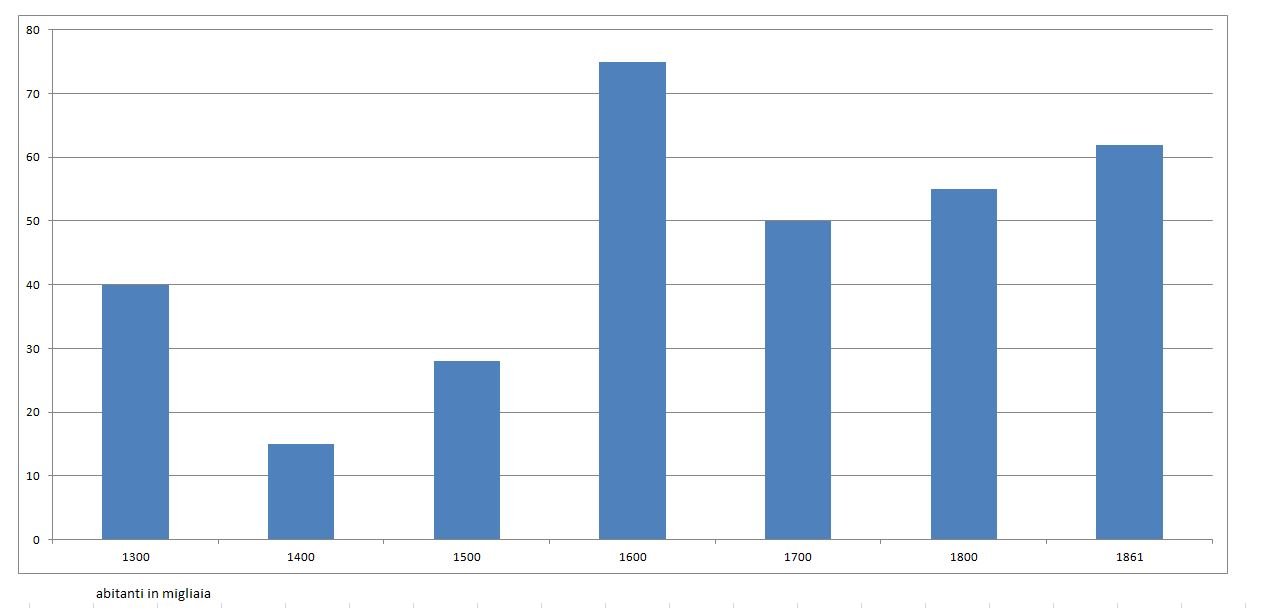
Population of Messina from 1300 to 1861

As of 2026, the population is 216,458, of which 48.2% are males, and 51.8% are females. Minors make up 14.4% of the population, and seniors make up 26.0%.

The 1911 census recorded a drastic contraction due to the 1908 Messina earthquake. The victims were actually much more numerous than would appear from a simple subtraction between the data of that census and the previous one, because the city, almost entirely depopulated, was repopulated by inhabitants from other areas of Sicily and Calabria, attracted by the reconstruction and by the large gaps that opened up in public employment and trade. The families from Messina who had lived in the city since before 1908 are now very few.

=== Immigration ===
As of 2025, immigrants make up 6.7% of the population. The 5 largest foreign countries of birth are Sri Lanka, Philippines, Romania, Morocco, and Argentina.

== Government ==
=== Municipal administration ===
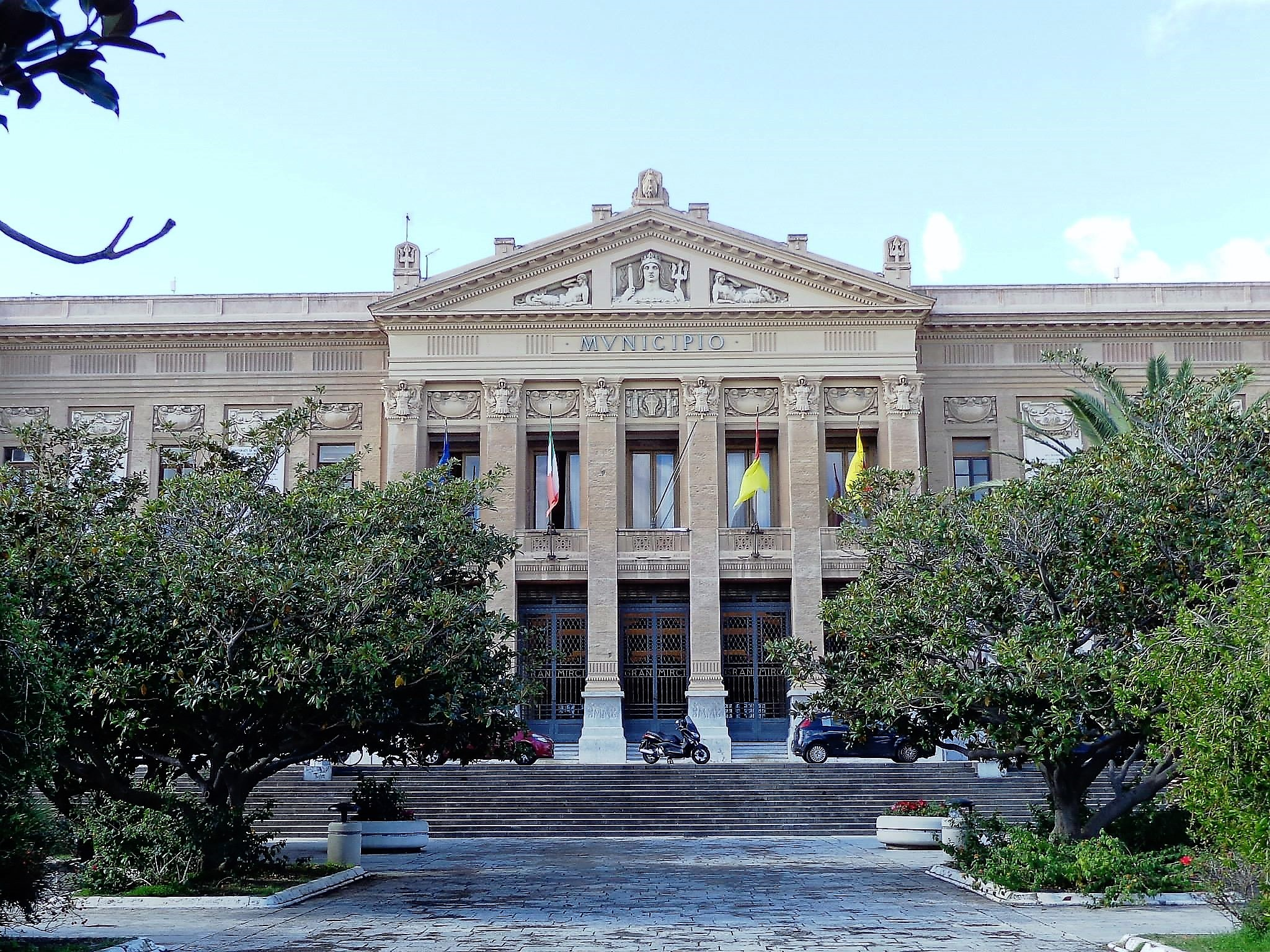
Palazzo Zanca, the town hall of Messina

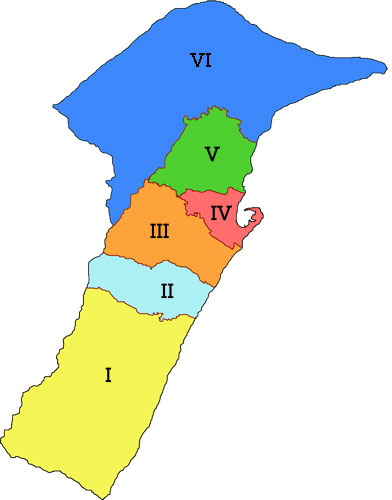
Map of the municipal territory of Messina divided into its six districts

Since 1994 the mayor is elected directly by Messina's electorate.

=== Administrative subdivisions ===
The territory of the municipality of Messina is divided into six districts, which are in turn divided into dozens of frazioni.

=== Metropolitan area of Messina ===
The metropolitan area of Messina, still unimplemented to date, was established in 1986 by the Sicily region and delimited by a decree of 1995. It would include 51 municipalities on a surface of 1,135 km^{2} (438 sq mi) and would be characterized by an uninterrupted ribbon-like coastal conurbation of 150 km (93 mi) between Furnari on the Tyrrhenian Sea and the Alcantara River on the Ionian Sea, passing through Milazzo, Barcellona Pozzo di Gotto, Lipari, Taormina and Giardini Naxos.

== Main sights ==
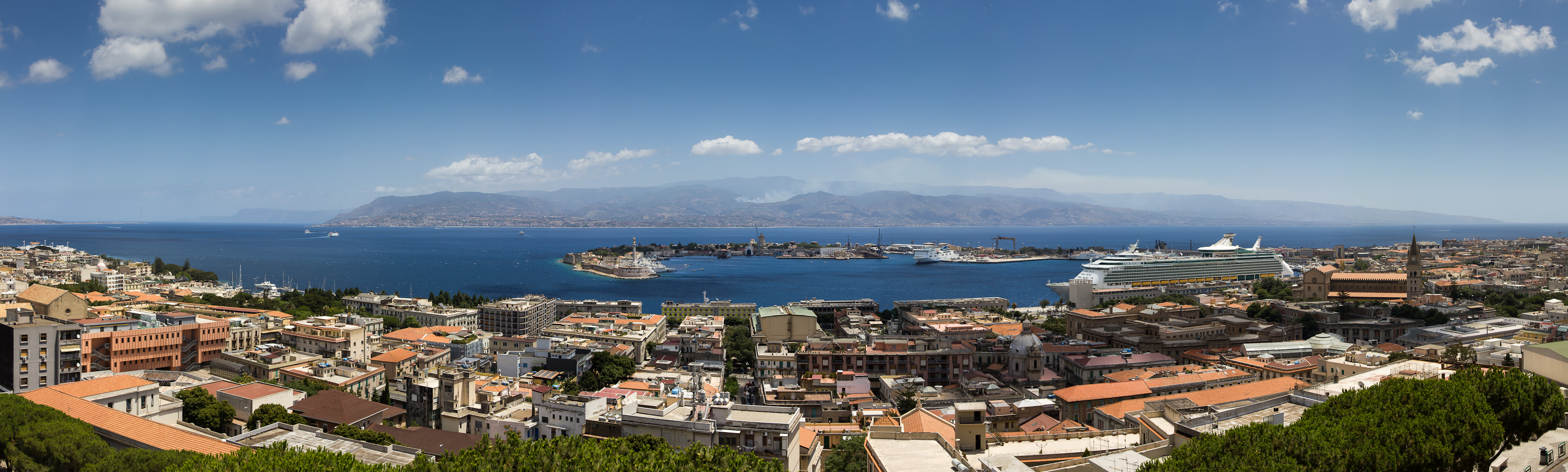
Panorama of the Messina Strait seen from Messina towards the Italian mainland. Reggio Calabria is visible on the right.

=== Religious architecture ===
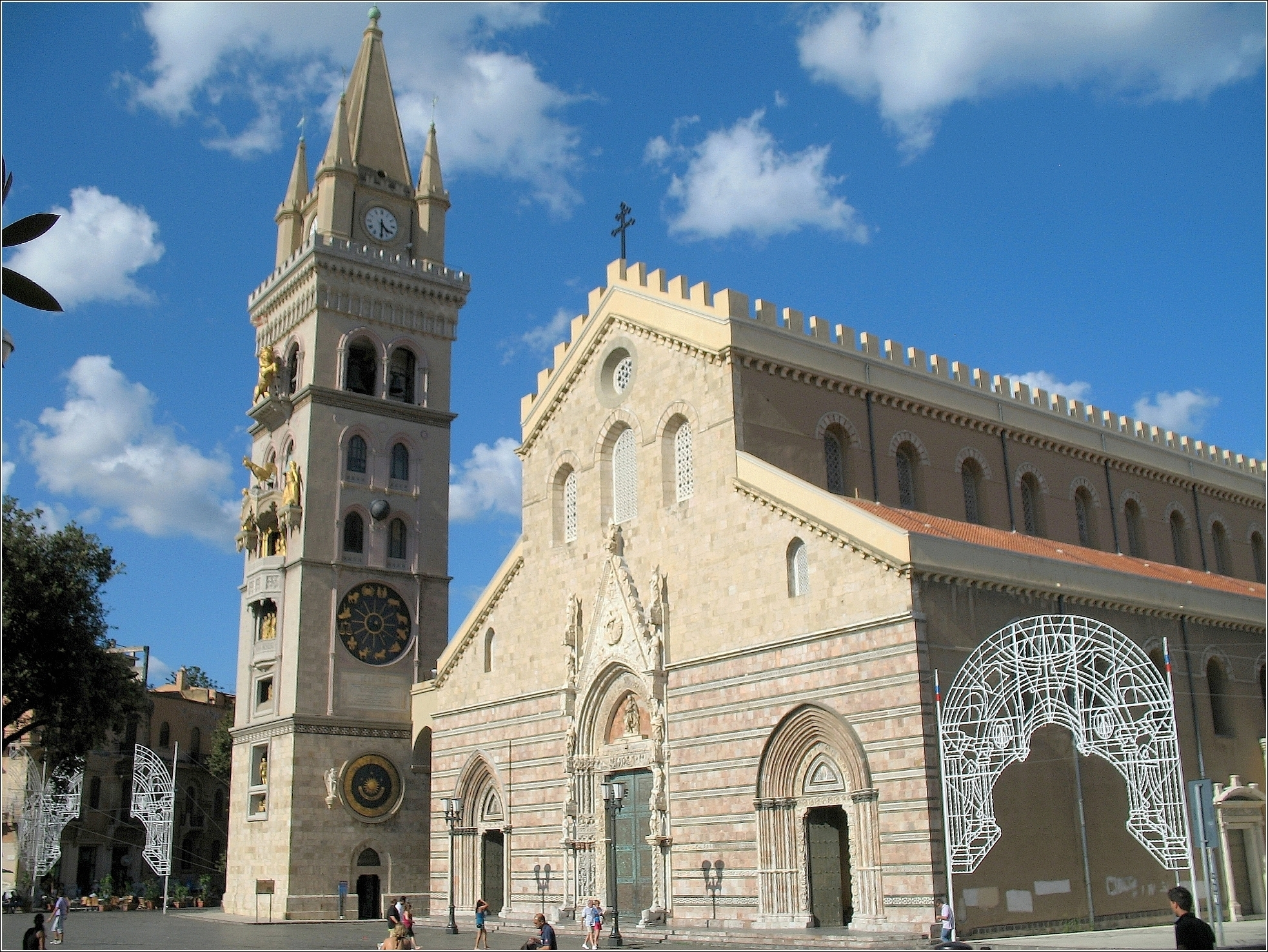
Messina Cathedral.

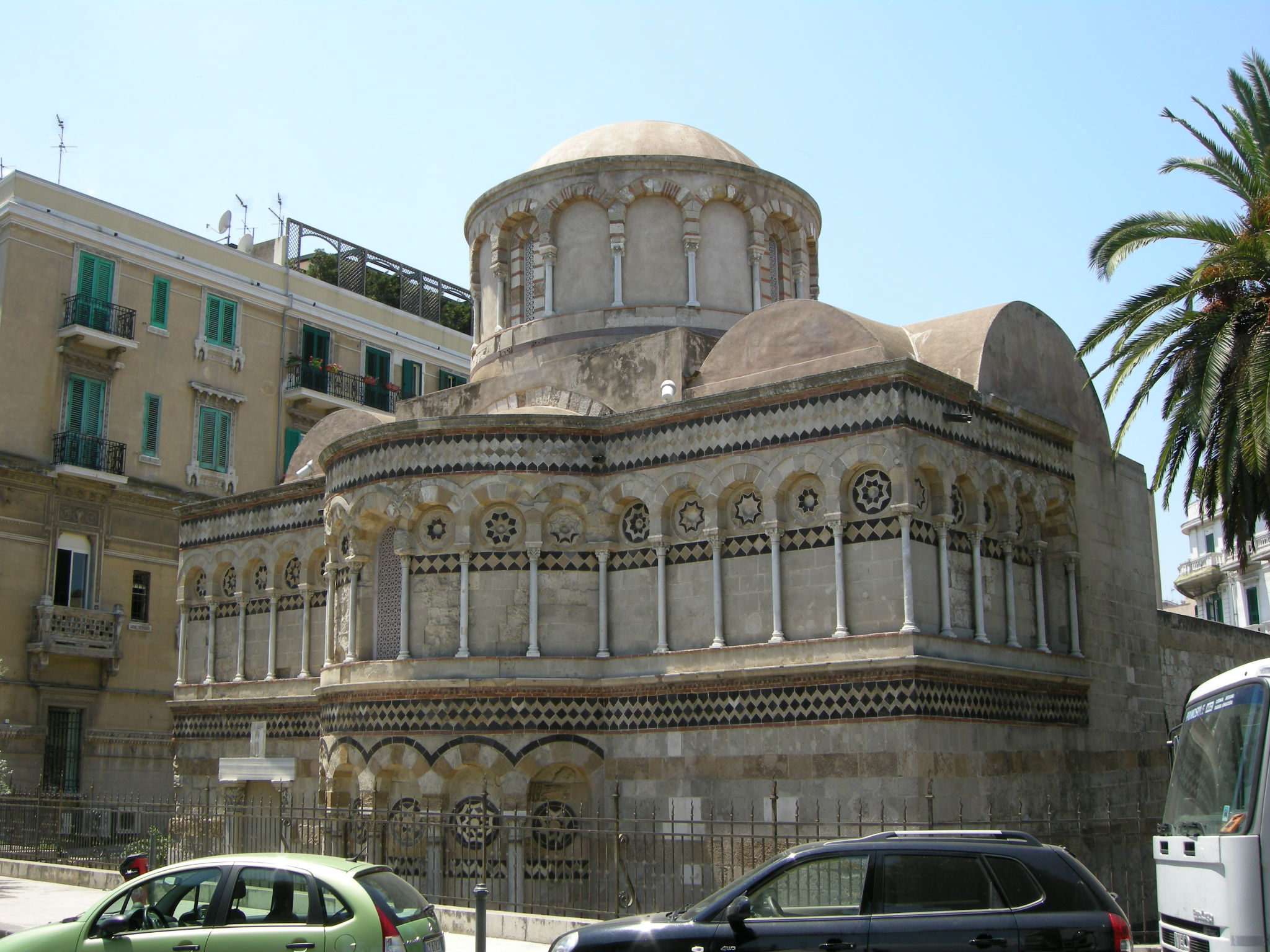
Church of the Santissima Annunziata dei Catalani.

- Messina Cathedral (12th century)
- Chiesa del Carmine.
- The Church of the Santissima Annunziata dei Catalani (late 12th–13th century).

=== Civil and military architecture ===
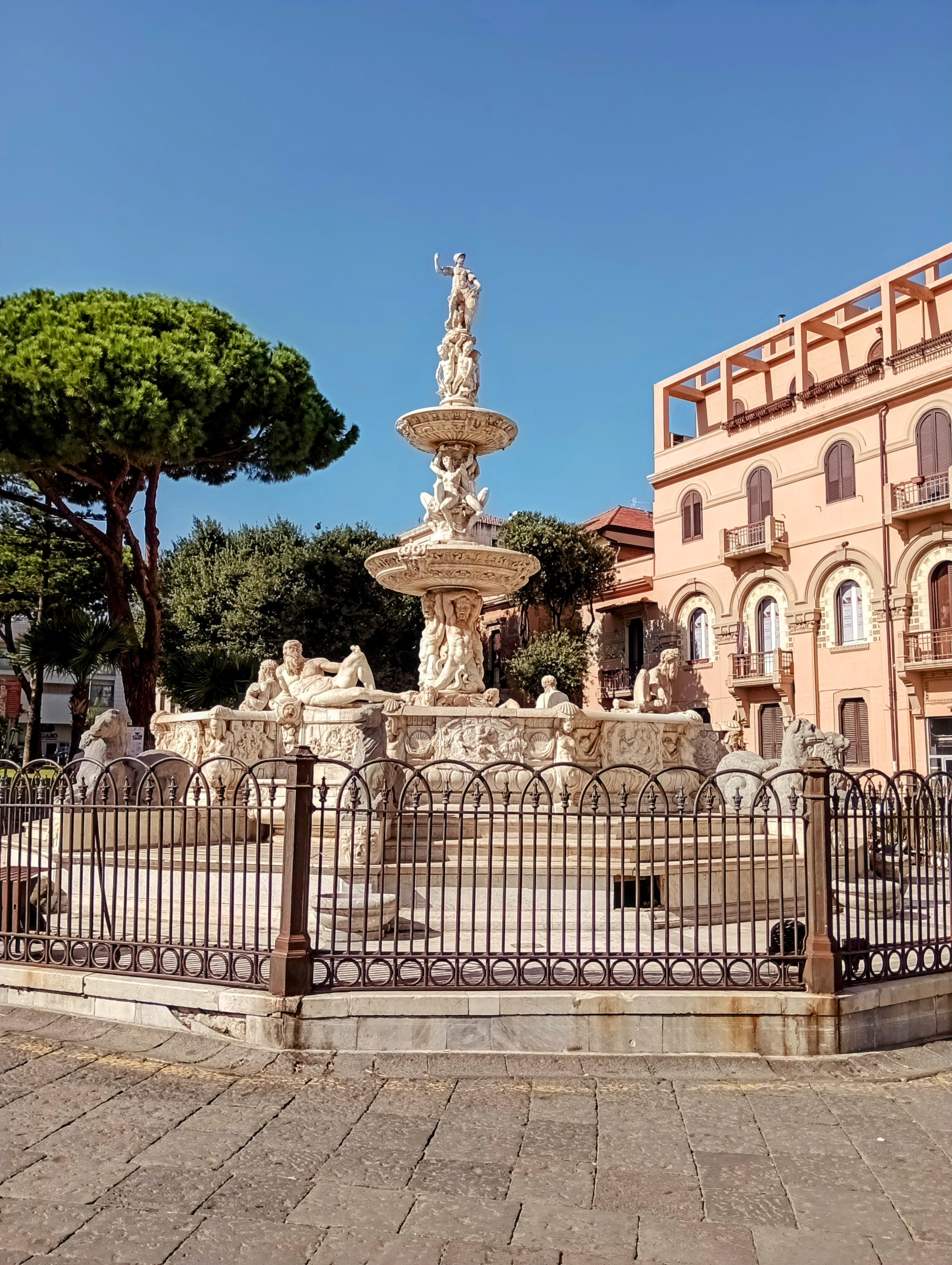
Fountain of Orion in Piazza Duomo

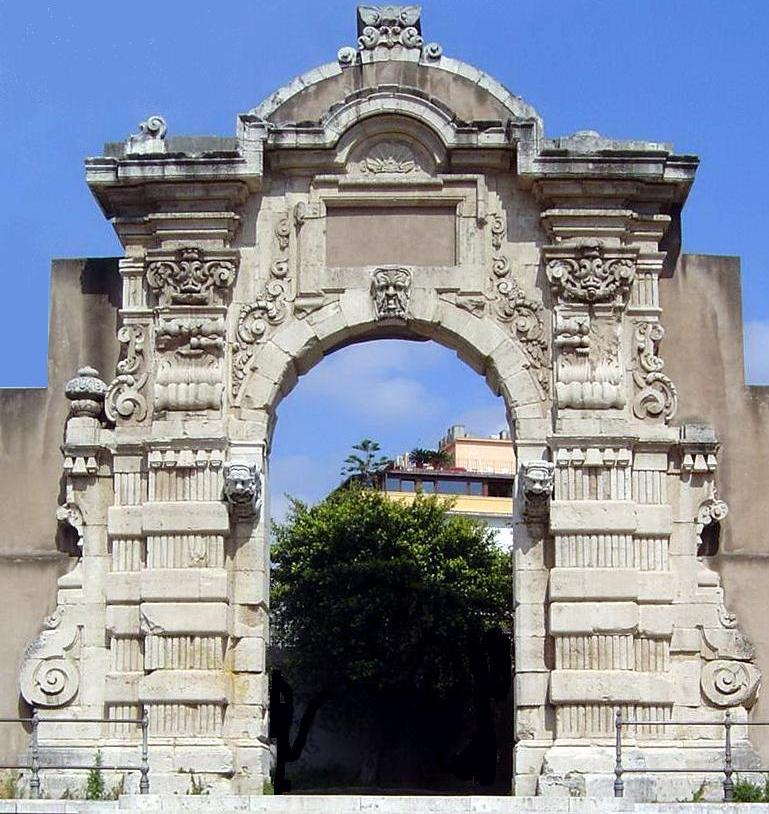
Porta Grazia

- The Forte del Santissimo Salvatore, a 16th-century fort in the Port of Messina.
- The Forte Gonzaga, a 16th-century fort overlooking Messina.
- The Pylons of Messina, built in 1957 to carry a 220 kV overhead power line.
- The Palace of Culture, built in 2009.

=== Monuments ===
- The monument to John of Austria (1572)
- LaFenice, a sculpture on Piazza della Memoria

=== Museums ===
- Museo Regionale di Messina (MuMe) hosting notable paintings by Caravaggio, Antonello da Messina, Alonzo Rodriguez, Mattia Preti

== Culture ==
=== Literature ===
Messina is the setting for two of William Shakespeare's plays, Much Ado About Nothing and The Winter's Tale. In August 2011, the city council of Messina voted to grant Shakespeare honorary citizenship.

In the science fiction novel The Condemned of Messina by the American writer Ben Bova, the city of Messina is the seat of the world government.

=== Cuisine ===
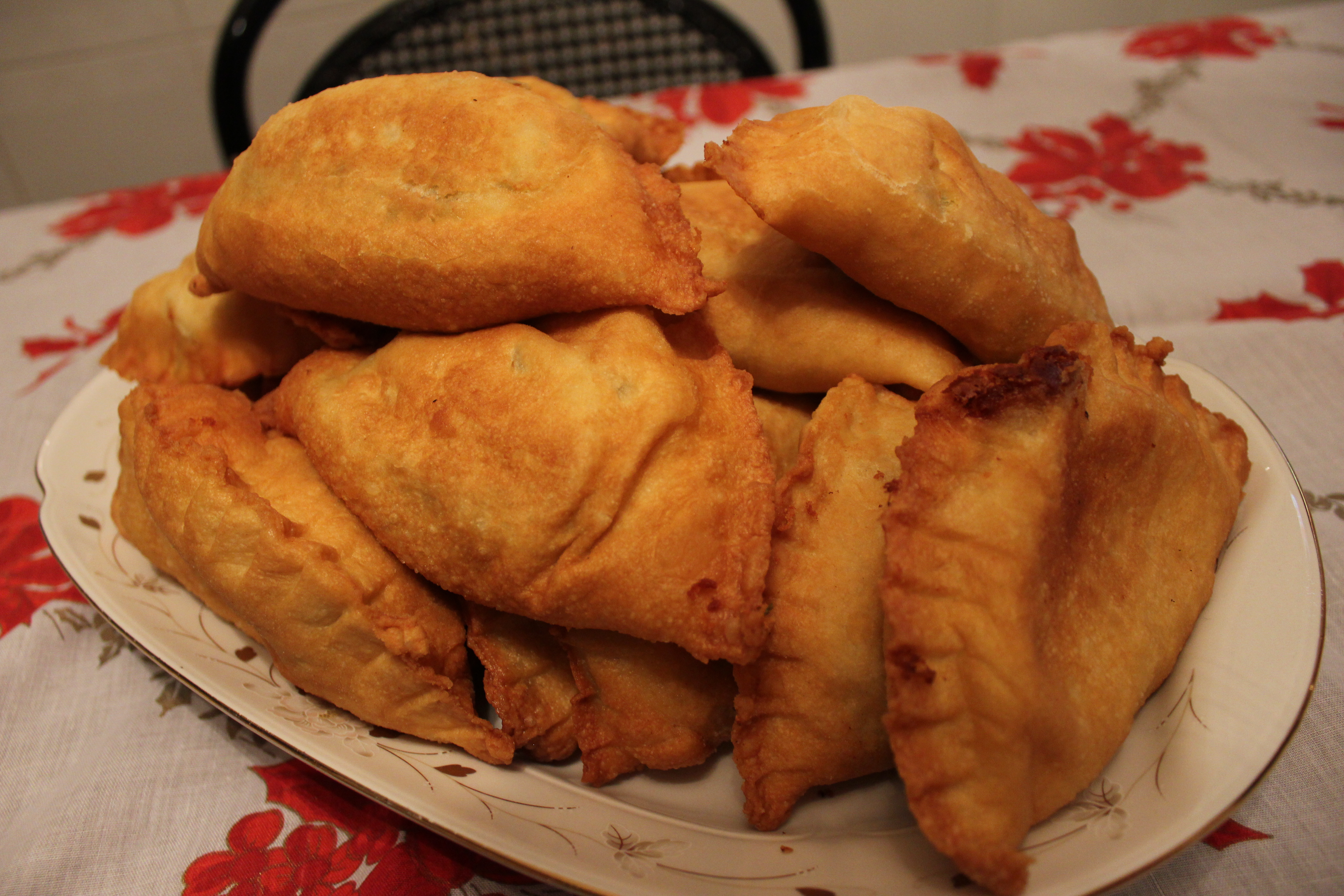
Pitoni, a common dish in Messina

The specialities of Messina's cuisine are fish and seafood dishes: swordfish, stockfish, mussels, saury, neonata and tuna. Meat-based dishes include braciole (a unique cut different from the rest of Italy) and falsomagro. Typical Messina desserts include: pignolata glazeata, bianco e nero, ricotta, cannoli with a chocolate variant, and cassata siciliana. Also typical are focaccia messinese (curly escarole, desalted anchovies, black pepper and tuma cheese), pane alla disgraziata

=== Universities ===
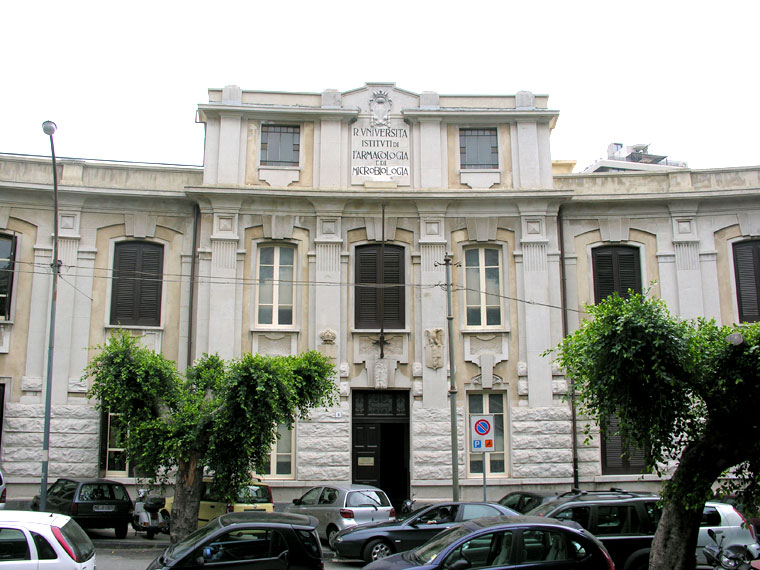
University of Messina

The University of Messina (Latin: Studiorum Universitas Messanae), known colloquially as UniME, is a state university located in Messina. Founded in 1548 by Pope Paul III, it was the world's first Jesuit college, and today it is counted among the oldest universities in Italy. It is organized in 12 departments offering more than 80 Graduate and Undergraduate Degrees, over 20 Master's Degrees and 13 PhD Programmes. Among them, 7 are English-taught. The university counts more than 23.000 students distributed in the 4 campus facilities spread across the city.

Over the centuries the University of Messina has been a centre of attraction for esteemed scholars and historical figures, such as Giovanni Pascoli, Marcello Malpighi, Gaetano Salvemini and Vittorio Emanuele Orlando. The Central Administration Buildings and the Faculties of Economics, Political Science, Law and Education are located in the centre of Messina in the historical site of the university or Polo Centrale.

The Faculty of Medicine is held in the main hospital of the city, Policlinico G. Martino, situated in the southern area of Messina. The Faculties of Sciences and Engineering are located inside Polo Papardo, overlooking the famous Strait of Messina. The Faculties of Veterinary Medicine, Pharmacy and Humanities are established in the Polo Annunziata facility, which is also the Sport Centre of the university.

=== Traditions and folklore ===
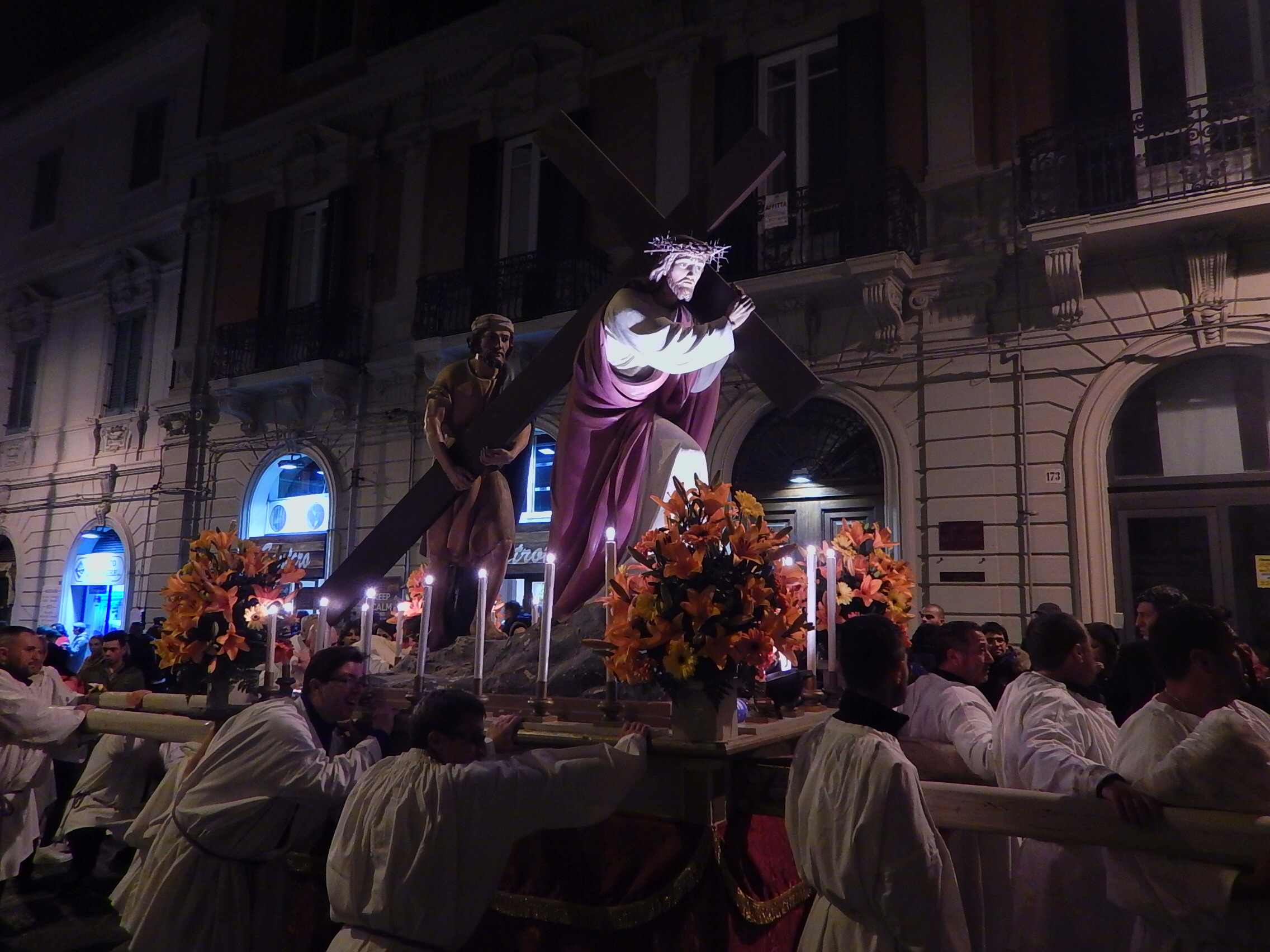
Good Friday celebrations in Messina

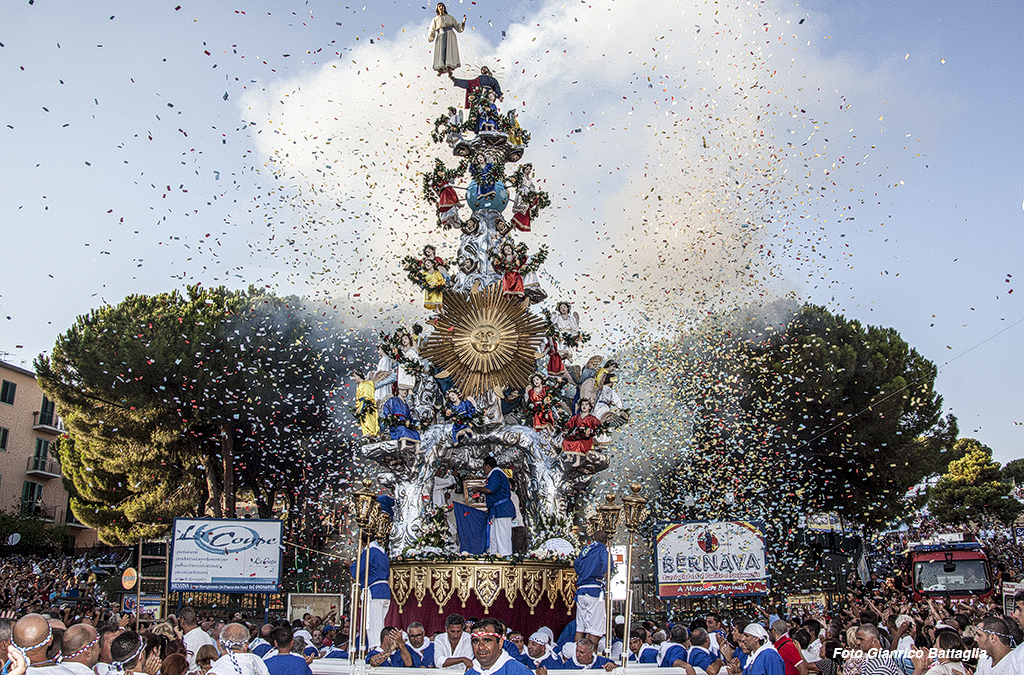
The Ferragosto procession in Messina

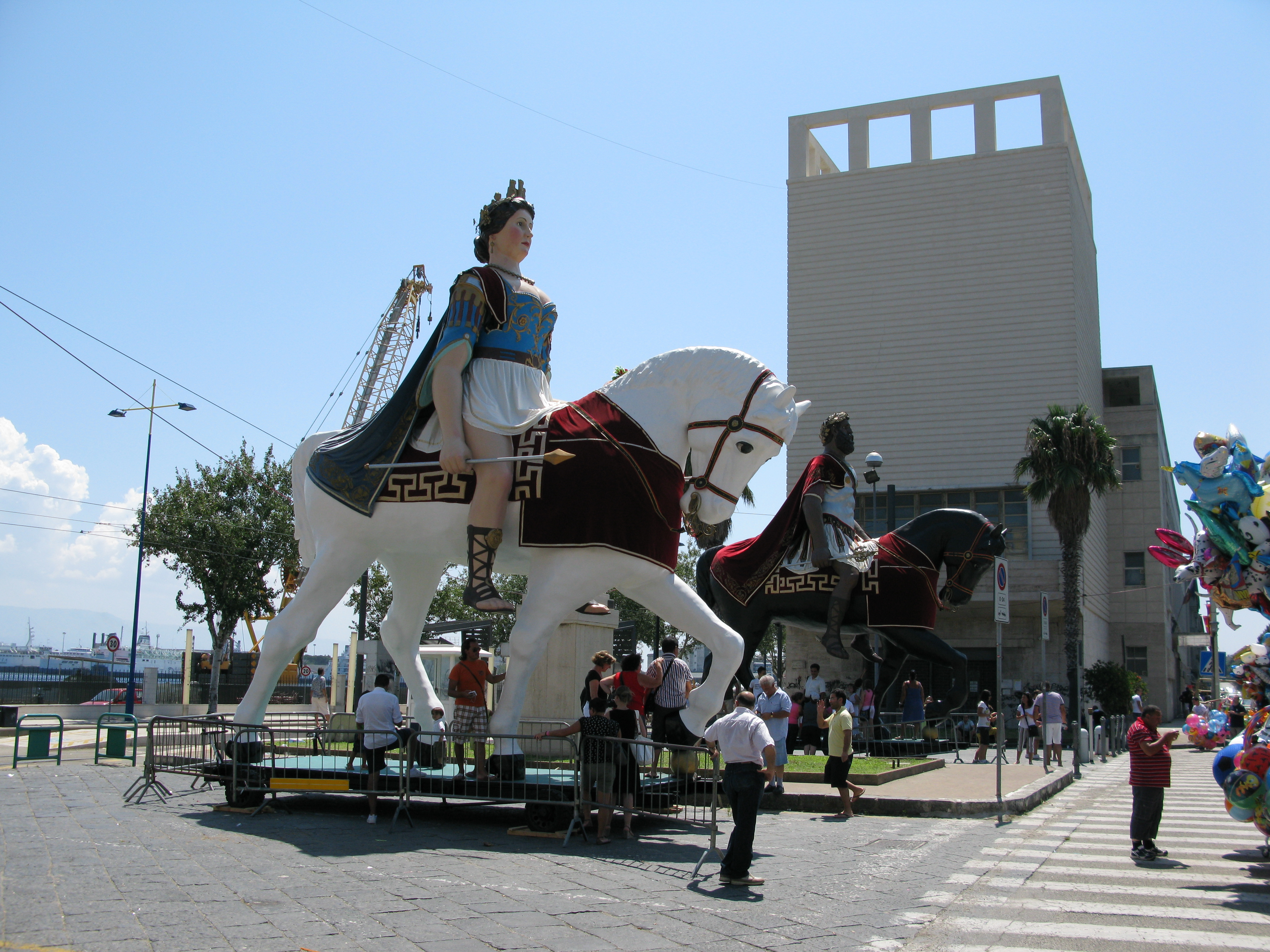
The giants Mata and Grifone of the Ferragosto procession in Messina

The Good Friday celebrations wind through the main streets of the city with the procession of the Barette (Varette), dating back to 1610.

On the feast day of Corpus Christi, a long procession begins from the Cathedral, preceded by hooded Catholic believers called "Babaluci" and by all the religious associations, congregations and archconfraternities of the city. Together with the monstrance with the Blessed Sacrament, carried under a rich silk canopy by the Archbishop, the "Vascelluzzo" (small vessel) is carried on the shoulders, a fercolo in chiseled silver adorned with small red drapes and ears of wheat. The work is an ex voto made by the people of Messina as a sign of thanks to the Madonna della Lettera who, according to legend, during various famines, brought several vessels loaded with wheat to the city's port. The Vascelluzzo is kept at the Church of the Sailors and is displayed behind safety glass in addition to two heavy iron grates overexposed. On the morning of Corpus Christi it is carried on the shoulders of 16 people, with a pace that makes it seem as if the Vascelluzzo is sailing on the sea, and enters the cathedral at the stroke of midday. Once it has arrived at the main altar, the relic of the Lock of Hair of the Madonna is placed in the centre of the Vascelluzzo. In the evening, after Holy Mass, the Vascelluzzo without the relic is brought back in procession to the Church of the Sailors where it is welcomed with the setting off of fireworks.

In the days leading up to 15 August, the streets of the city are filled with the festive procession of the two Giants and the Camel, along with numerous folk groups. In particular, the two colossal statues on horseback represent the legendary founders of the city, the Messina native Mata and the Moor Grifone (known as "u giganti e a gigantissa"). The statues derive from the processional giants of the ancient Catalan tradition, still present today in many areas of Catalonia and used during various festivities, such as Tarragona for the feast of Santa Tecla, or during the fiesta Mayor de Reus which takes place on the day of San Pietro Reus. Contact with the Catalan domination brought the tradition of processional giants which also spread to Sicily and today is linked to the cult of the Virgin Mary, as in the case of the giants Mata and Grifone of the feast of the Assumption in Messina and the giants Kronos and Mytia of the feast of the Madonna della luce in Mistretta, while the Camel recalls the triumphal entry into Messina, at the beginning of the conquest of Sicily taken from the Arabs, of the Norman Count Roger I of Hauteville, which according to tradition took place on the back of a camel.

== Economy ==
=== Agriculture, fishing and livestock ===
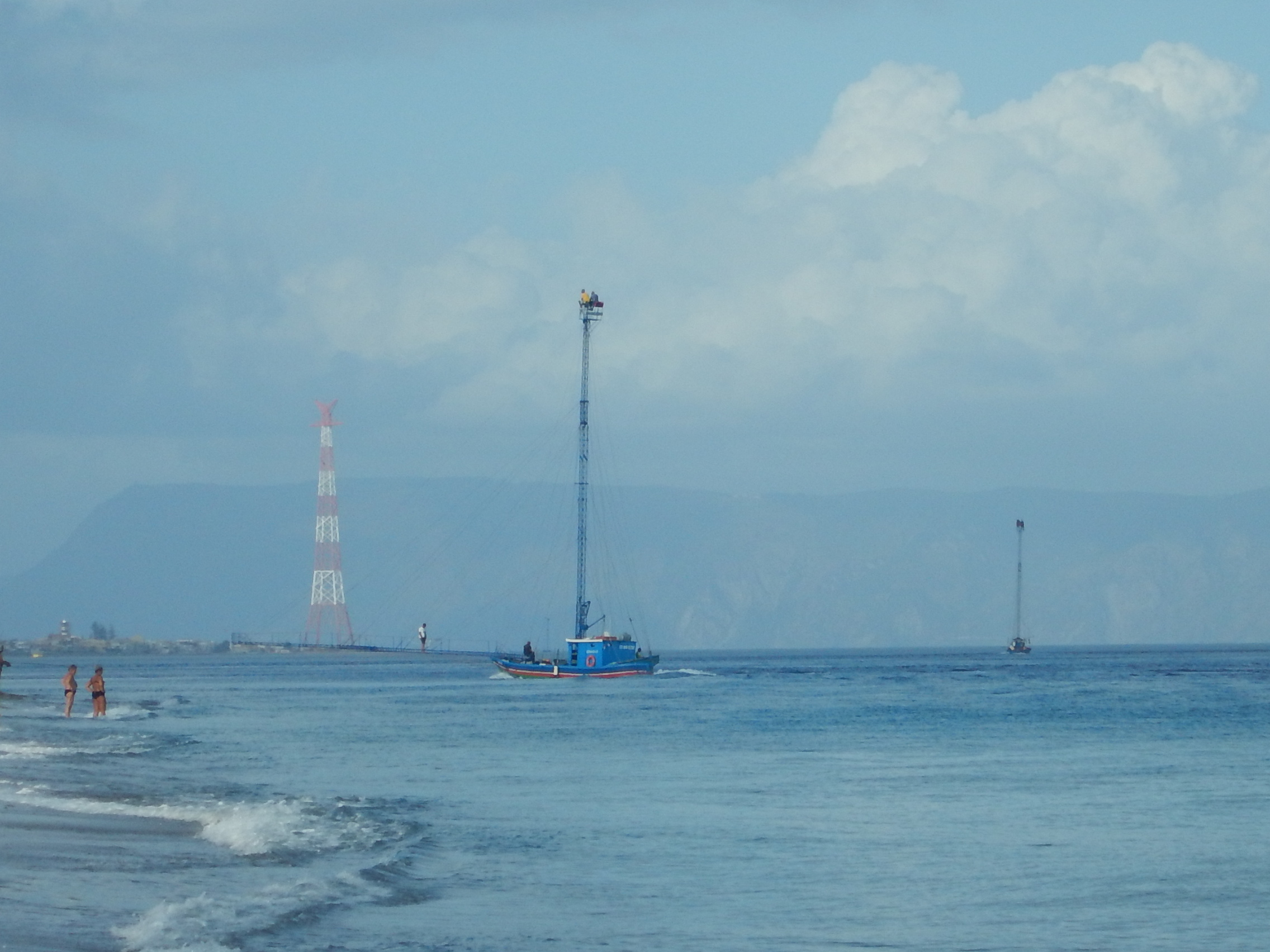
A felucca, a boat used by fishermen of Messina to catch swordfish

Agricultural products include:

- Vines, from which red and white wines are produced, including the DOC Faro
- Beer, where the Birra DOC 15 and the Birra dello Stretto have been produced since 2016 in a Messina brewery.

Breeding animals for red meat, especially sheep whose meat is traditionally eaten in the city cooked in a wood oven, and cattle whose entrails are roasted on the grill and also sold on the street, a dish that in the Messina dialect is called: taiuni, virina and paddi i boi.

=== Crafts and industry ===
The secondary sector includes:

A Regional Industrial Zone (ZIR), in the southern part of the city, there were activities such as grain milling, production of food products, prefabricated buildings, furniture, etc. The hub for the artisanal development of Larderia, also in the southern part of the city. Numerous medium-sized artisanal activities are based there, with high-quality production (companies in the food sector, furniture, prefabricated and building materials).

=== Tertiary ===
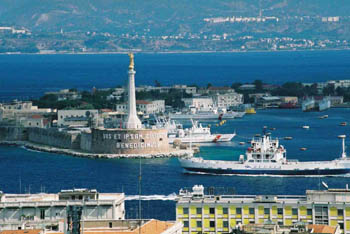
Port of Messina

The tertiary sector is, historically, the driving sector of the city's economy. This is partly due to the presence of the Port of Messina, which in the past was an important export hub for local products (wine, silk, and above all, citrus products).

=== Tourism ===
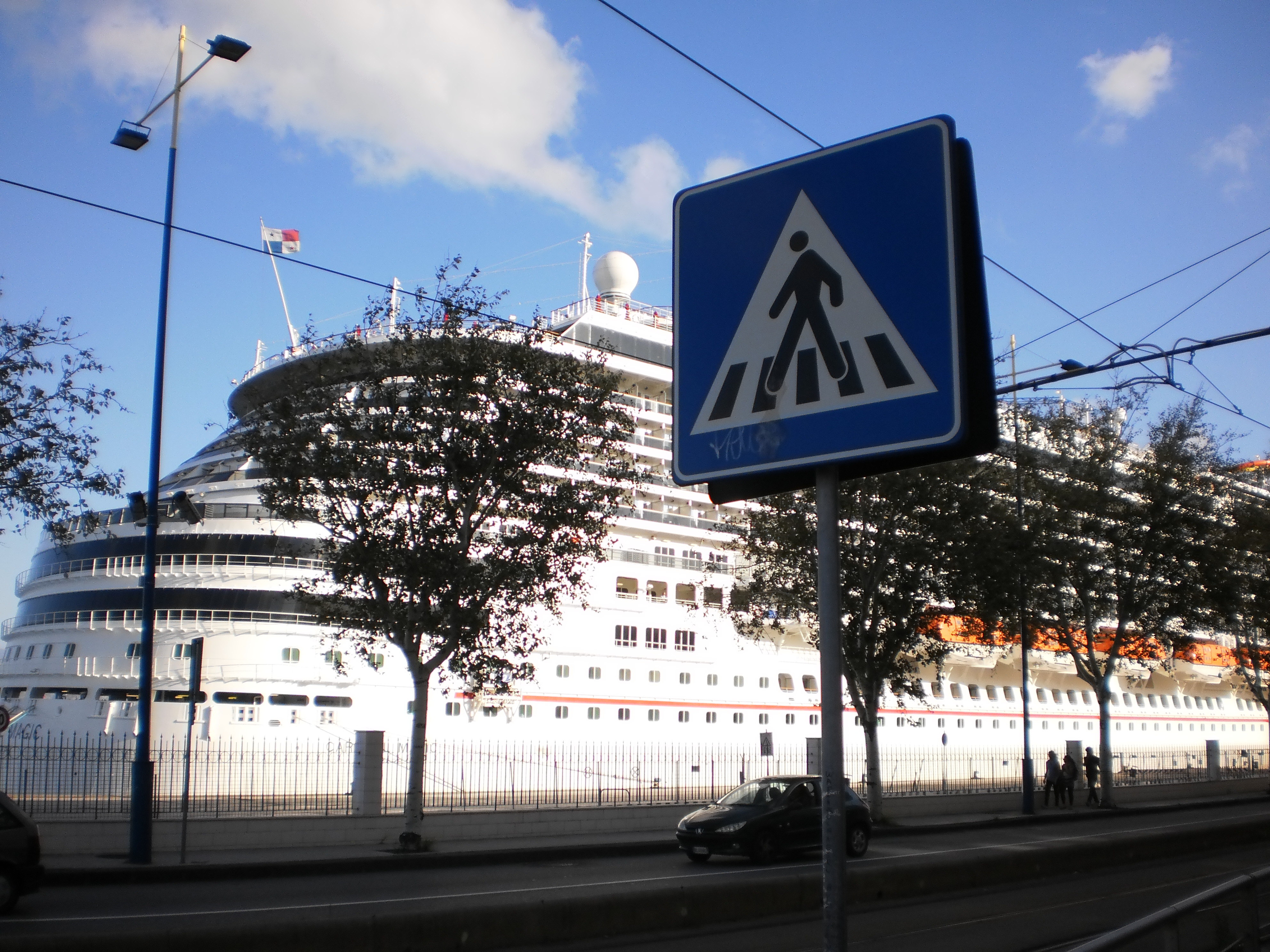
Cruise ship in the Port of Messina.

The tourism sector has developed with the annual presence of cruise passengers in the city, reviving Messina from a serious crisis in the sector due to the proximity of the major attractions of Taormina and the Aeolian Islands (which make the metropolitan city the second most visited in Southern Italy after Naples and the first in Sicily). In 2017, 367,269 cruise passengers disembarked at the city's port, in 2024 650,000.

In 2025, Messina received the recognition of Blue Flag beach, the international eco-label awarded by the Foundation for Environmental Education for the quality of beaches and coastal services, with over 11 km of its coastline included in the award.

== Transport ==
=== Roads ===
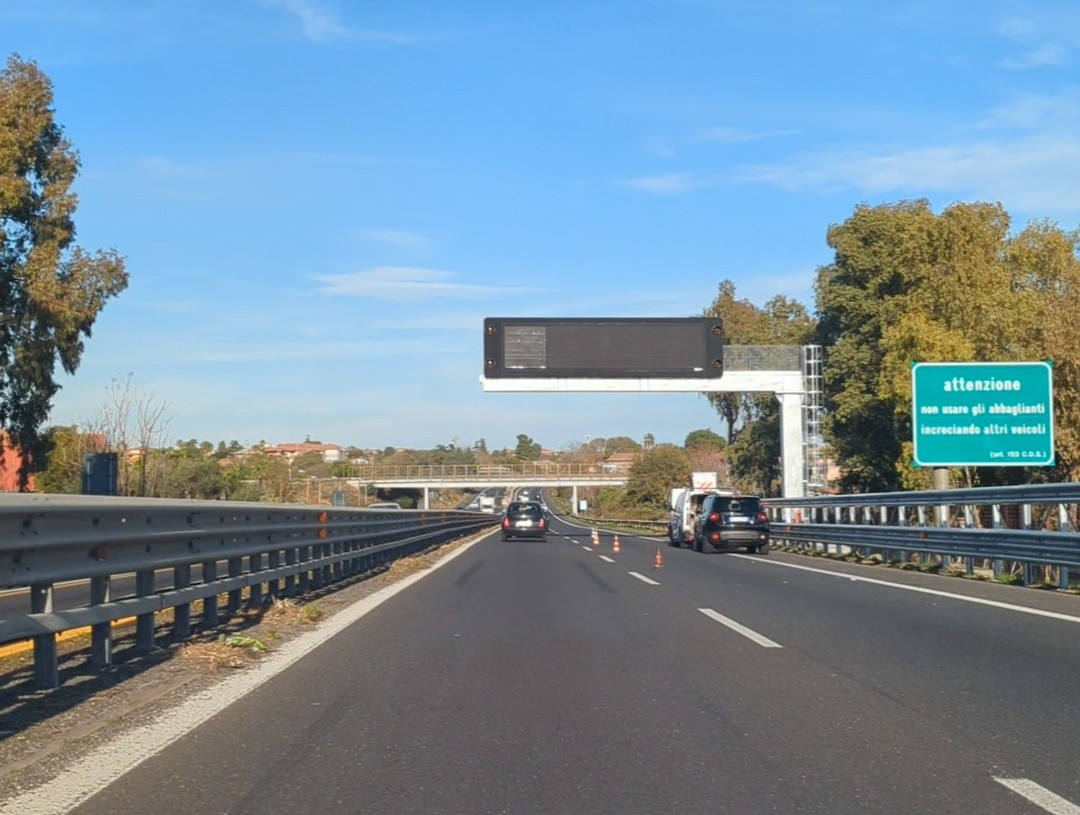
Autostrada A18 Messina-Catania

The Messina motorway ring road is part of the Autostrada A20 Messina-Palermo.

=== Railways ===
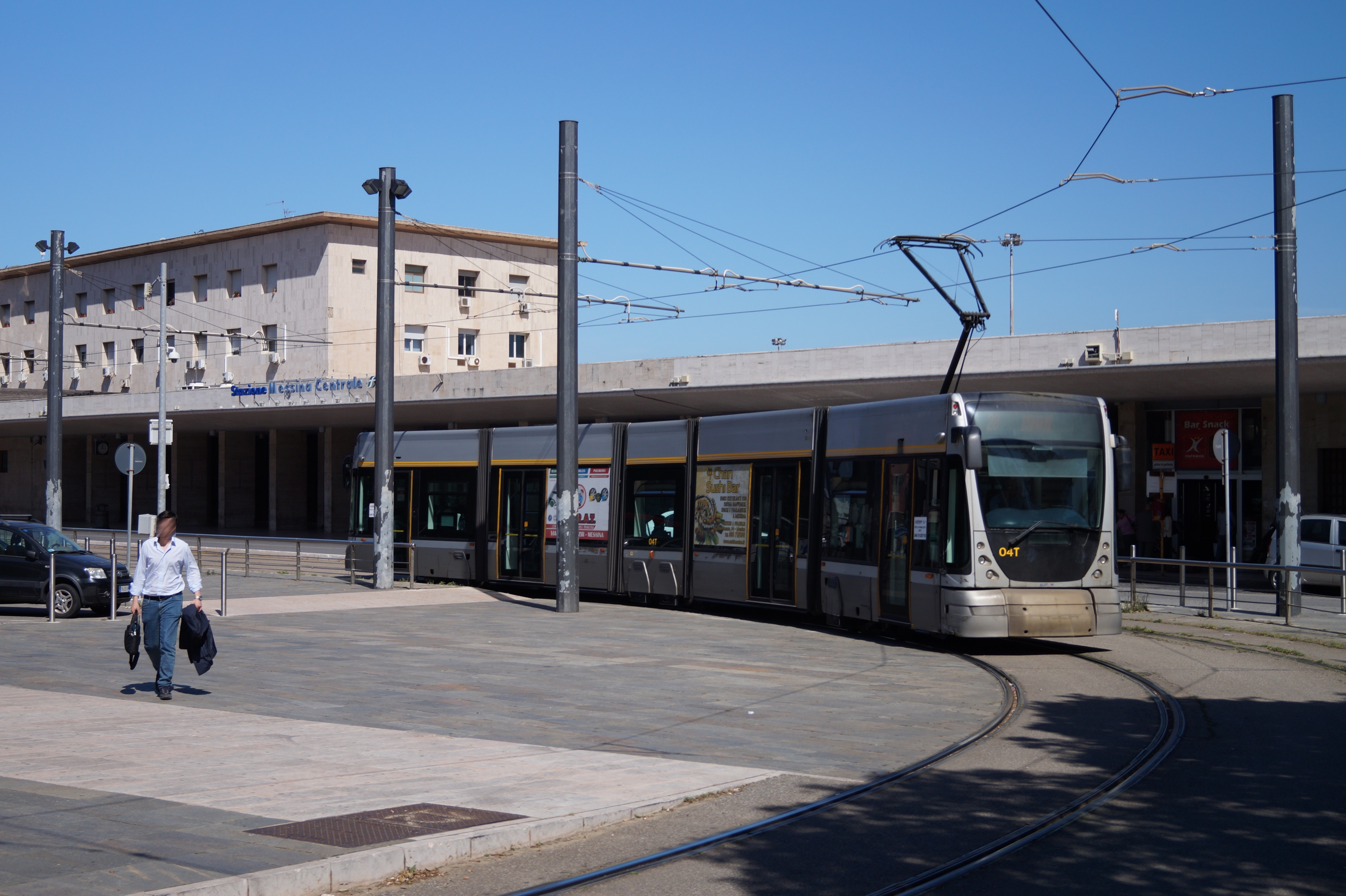
Messina Centrale railway station

The new Messina Centrale station building was projected following the modern criteria of the futurist architect Angiolo Mazzoni, and is extended through the stations square. It is at almost contiguous with Messina Marittima station, located by the port and constituting a Ferry transport in the Strait of Messina to Villa San Giovanni station across the Strait of Messina. In 2021 the harbor of Messina was the busiest passenger port in Europe with over 8,232,000 passenger crossings in one year.

The station is electrified and served by regional trains. For long-distance transport it counts some InterCity and ICN night trains to Rome, linking it also with Milan, Turin, Venice, Genoa, Bologna, Florence, and other cities. It is also part of the projected Berlin–Palermo railway axis.

Since 2010, a suburban train service has been carried out along the Messina-Catania-Syracuse railway with routes serving the stations of Fiumara Gazzi, Contesse, Tremestieri, Mili Marina, Galati, Ponte Santo Stefano, Ponte Schiavo, San Paolo and Giampilieri.

=== Bus and tram ===
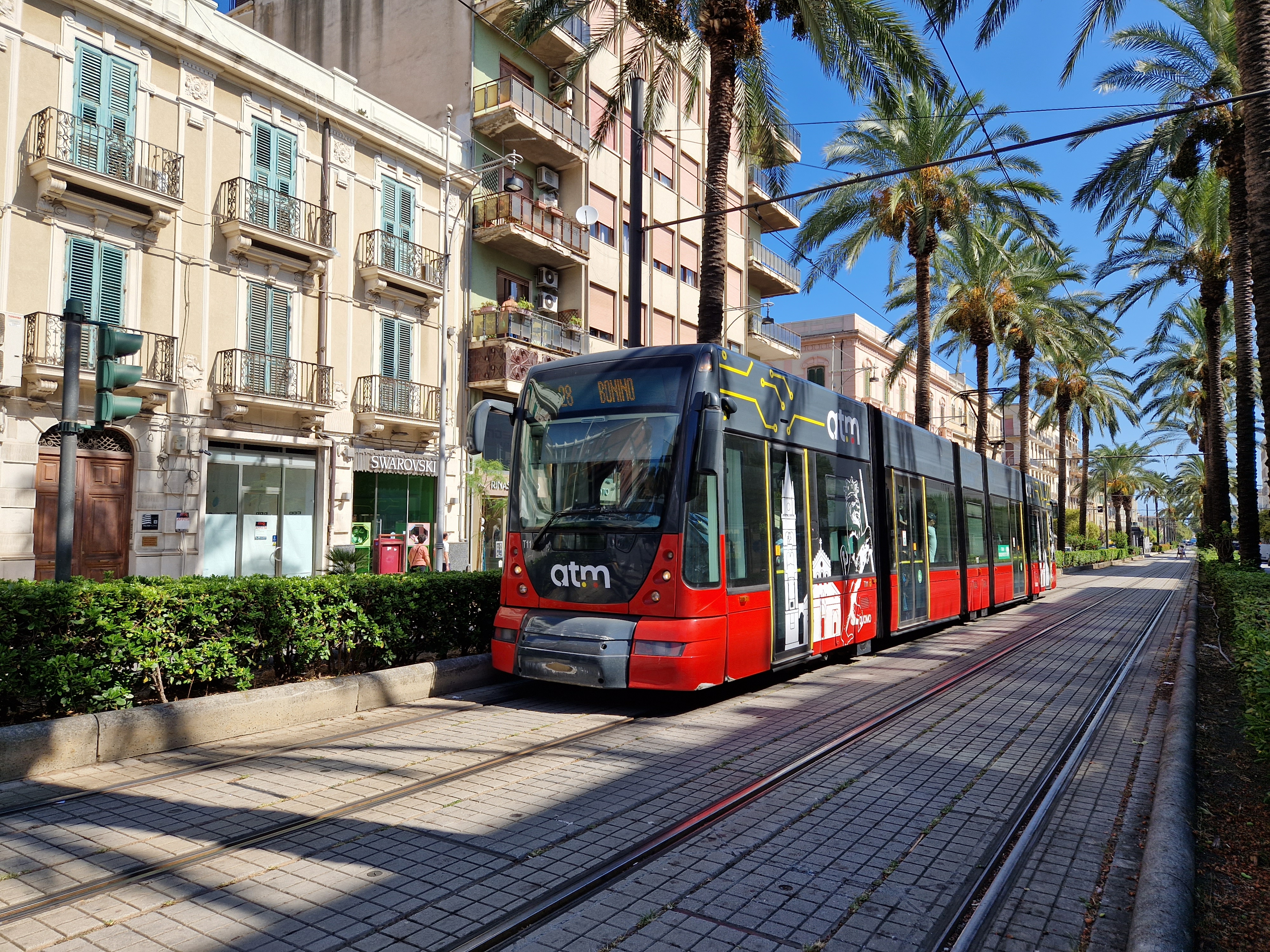
Tram no T11 in Messina

Messina's public bus system is operated by ATM Messina: starting from 8 October 2018, has reorganized the offer of public transport, introducing a bus line (line 1 - Shuttle 100) which with a frequency of approx. 15 minutes, it crosses 38 of the total 50 km of the coast of the City of Messina. Thus, a comb service is created, with interchange stops at which the buses to and from the villages terminate, and with the tram which reaches a frequency of about 20 minutes. About 36 different routes reach every part of the city and also the modern Messina tramway (at "Repubblica" stop, on station's square), opened in 2003. This line is 7.7 km (4.8 mi) and links the city's central railway station with the city centre and harbour.

=== Strait of Messina Bridge ===
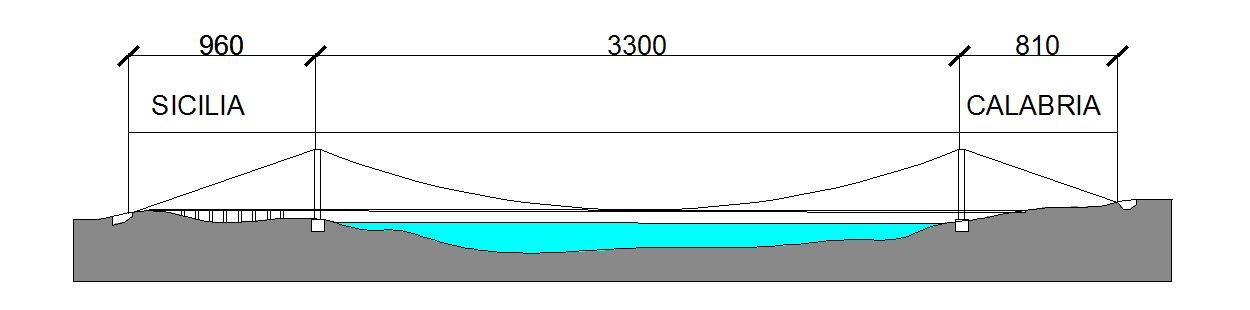
Cross-sectional diagram of the Strait of Messina Bridge

The Strait of Messina Bridge is a proposed 3.6 km (2.2 mi) suspension bridge across the Strait of Messina, connecting Torre Faro in Sicily with Villa San Giovanni on the Italian peninsula.

While a bridge across the Strait of Messina had been proposed since ancient times, the first detailed plan was made in the 1990s for a suspension bridge. The project was cancelled in 2006 under prime minister Romano Prodi. On 6 March 2009, as part of a massive new public works programme, prime minister Silvio Berlusconi's government announced that construction of the Messina Bridge would indeed go ahead, pledging €1.3 billion as a contribution to the total cost, estimated at €6.1 billion. The project was cancelled again on 26 February 2013, by prime minister Mario Monti's government, due to budget constraints. A decade later, the project was revived again with a decree by Giorgia Meloni's government, on 16 March 2023, which received presidential approval on 31 March 2023.

If fully approved and built, it will be the longest suspension bridge in the world. The bridge would be part of the Berlin–Palermo railway axis (Line 1) of the Trans-European Transport Networks (TEN-T). Construction is set to begin in April 2025, with completion expected in 2032.

== Sport ==
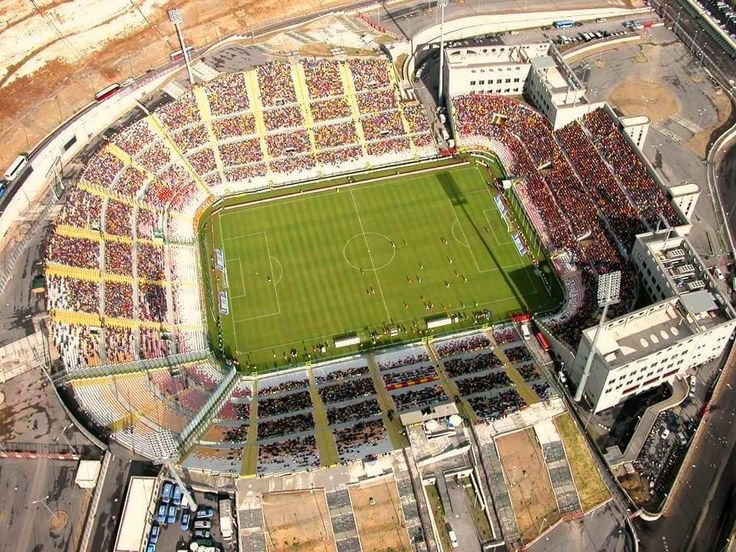
Stadio San Filippo

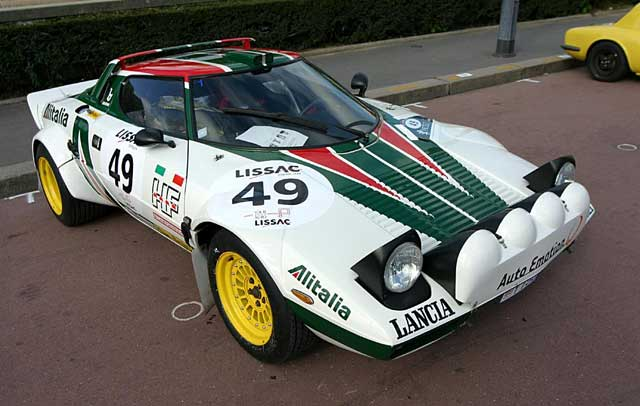
Lancia Stratos won the 1st edition of International Rally of Messina in 1979

Associazioni Calcio Riunite Messina is a football club based in Messina, that competes in the Serie C, the third tier of the Italian football league system. The origins of the team go back to 1900, when Messina F.C. was founded in the city. The club has spent most of its existence in the lower Italian football leagues. They last competed in Serie B in 2007–08, which followed three consecutive seasons in Serie A. In July 2008, Messina were excluded from professional football due to financial issues, being later registered into amateur Serie D. The farthest Messina has reached in the Coppa Italia is the last 16. This was achieved in the 2000s decade. In the past, they have also reached the semi-finals in the Coppa Italia Serie C. Messina have appeared in the Italy's top league, Serie A, for a total of five seasons. The club's first spell in the league was in the 1960s; the second began in the 2000s decade. The highest ever position they have finished is 7th, which happened during the 2004–05 season.

Pallacanestro Messina was an Italian professional basketball team based in Messina. Established in 1976, the club was admitted to the first division Serie A for the 2003-04 season after Virtus Bologna was excluded for financial irregularities. Messina struggled on every front during that season, finishing dead last in the league whilst suffering from financial problems and a lack of interest from the public. With debts too big to allow the club to even take part in other divisions and scaring off clubs that wanted to buy the side's sporting rights, Messina went bankrupt a few months after the season.

International Rally of Messina was a former rally competition that was held in Messina annually 1979 to 2004.

== Literature ==
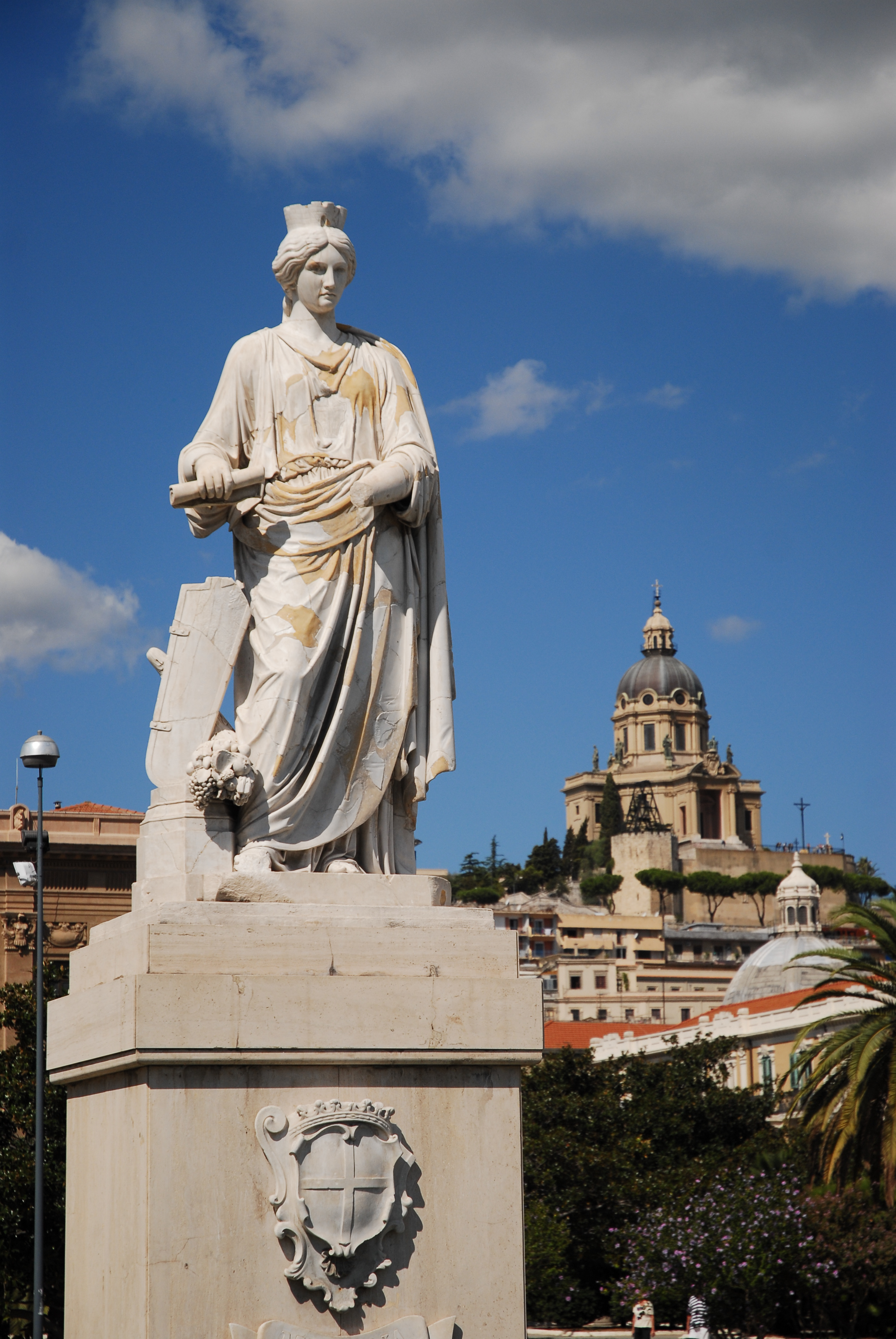
The statue of the personification of Messina

Numerous writers set their works in Messina, including:

- Plutarch – The Life of Pompey (40 BC?)
- Giovanni Boccaccio – Decameron IV day V novel, Lisabetta da Messina – IV day IV Novel, Gerbino ed Elissa (1351)
- Matteo Bandello – Novelliere First Part, novel XXII (1554)
- William Shakespeare – Much Ado about Nothing (1598) and Antony and Cleopatra (1607)
- Molière – L'Étourdi ou Les Contre-temps (1654)
- Friedrich Schiller – Die Braut von Messina (The Bride of Messina, 1803)
- Silvio Pellico – Eufemio da Messina (1818)
- Friedrich Nietzsche – Idyllen aus Messina (Idylls from Messina, 1882)
- Giovanni Pascoli – poem L'Aquilone (1904)
- Elio Vittorini – Le donne di Messina (Women of Messina, 1949) and Conversazione in Sicilia (Conversations in Sicily, 1941)
- Stefano D'Arrigo – Horcynus Orca (1975)
- Julien Green – Demain n'existe pas (1985)
- Simonetta Agnello Hornby La monaca (2013)

== International relations ==
=== Twin towns – sister cities ===
- Southampton, England, United Kingdom
- Townsville, Australia
- Nîmes, France
- Corfu, Greece
- Kochi, India

== Notable people ==
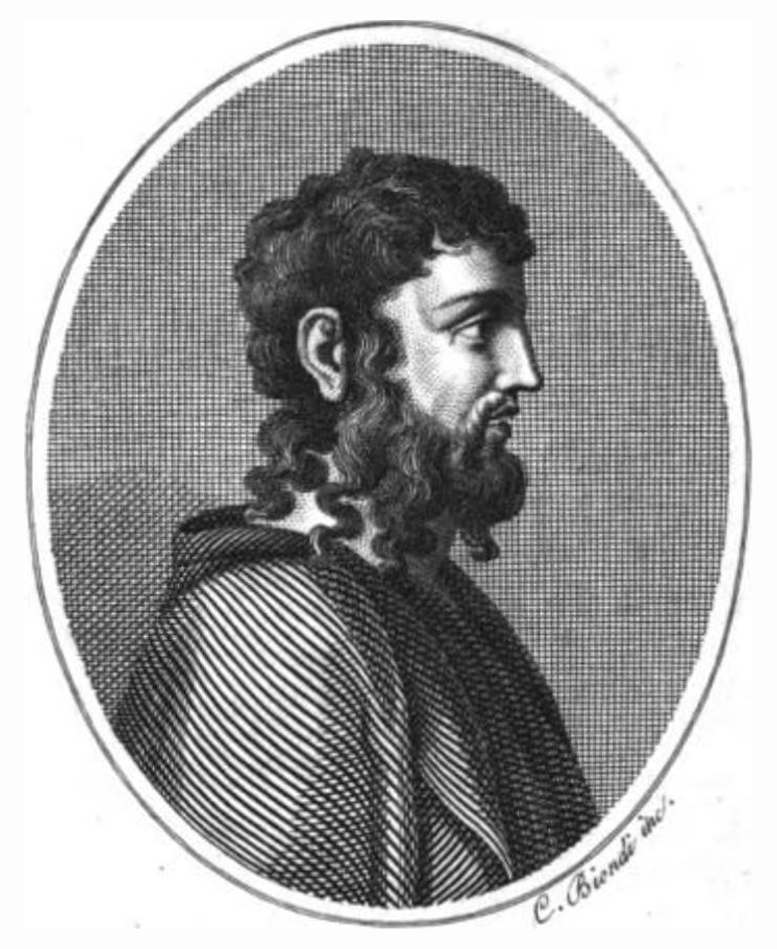
Dicaearchus of Messana

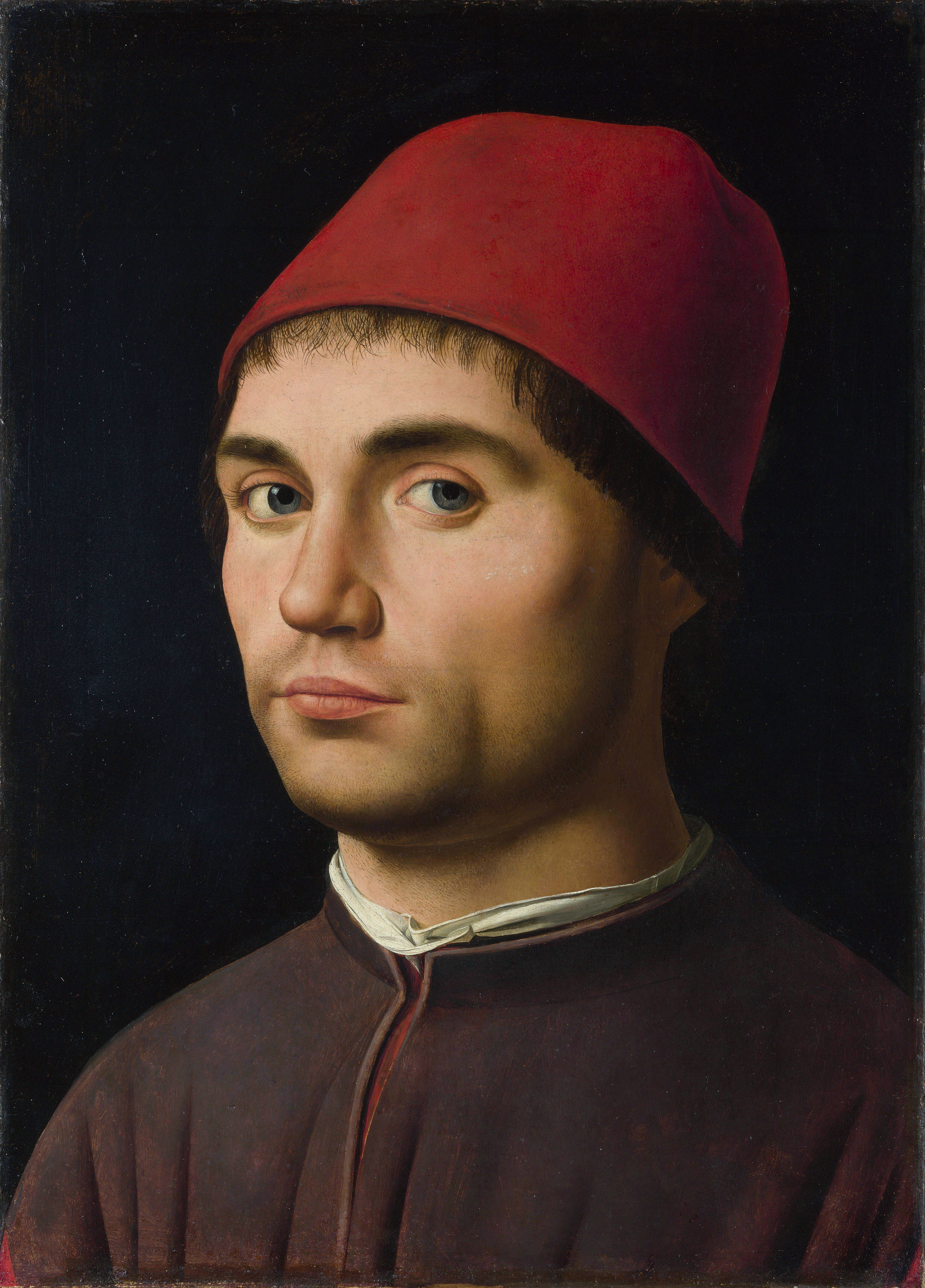
Antonello da Messina

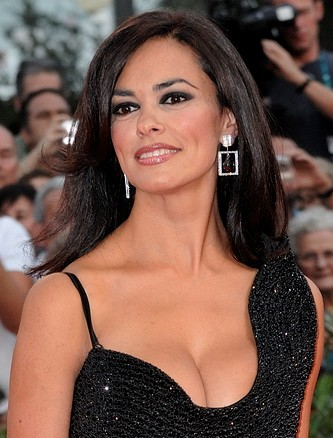
Maria Grazia Cucinotta

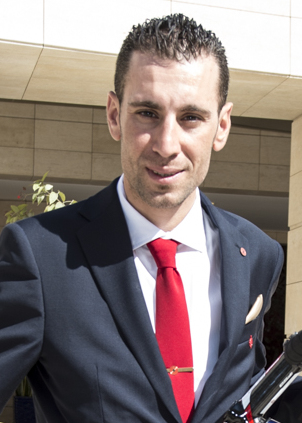
Vincenzo Nibali

List of notable people from Messina or connected to Messina, listed by career and then in alphabetical order by last name.

=== Actors ===
- Adolfo Celi, actor (1922–1986)
- Tano Cimarosa, actor (1922–2008)
- Maria Grazia Cucinotta, actress (born 1968)
- Nino Frassica, actor (born 1950)
- Massimo Mollica, actor (1929–2013)
- Adua Del Vesco, actress (born 1992)
- Ninni Bruschetta, actor (born 1962)
- Gino Buzzanca, actor (1912–1985)

=== Artists and designers ===
- Girolamo Alibrandi, painter (1470–1524)
- Anna Maria Arduino (1672 – 1700), 17th century painter, writer and socialite, served as the Princess of Piombino, from Messina.
- Antonio Barbalonga, painter (17th century)
- Francesco Comande, painter (16th century)
- Antonello da Messina, major painter of the Renaissance (1430–1479)
- Giuseppe Migneco, painter (1908–1997)
- Giovanni Quagliata, painter (1603–1673)
- Filippo Juvarra, Baroque architect (1678–1736)
- Mariano Riccio, painter (1510–1593)
- Alonzo Rodriguez, painter (1578–1648)
- Valentina Romeo (born 1977), cartoonist, illustrator, billiards player
- Giovanni Tuccari, painter (1667–1743)
- Pino da Messina, painter (born 15th century)

=== Politicians, civil service, military ===
- Rosa Donato (1808–1867), Italian revolutionary
- Giuseppe La Farina, leader of the Italian Risorgimento (1815–1863)
- Gaetano Martino, politician, physician and professor. (1900–1967)
- Giuseppe Natoli, lawyer and politician (1815–1867)
- Luigi Rizzo, naval officer and First World War hero (1887–1951)

=== Musicians, composers ===
- Mario Aspa, composer (1797–1868)
- Filippo Bonaffino (fl. 1623), Italian madrigal composer
- Alberto Urso, singer (born 1997)
- Peppino D'Agostino, guitarist (born 1956)

=== Religion ===
- Eustochia Smeralda Calafato, saint (1434–1485)
- Annibale Maria Di Francia, saint (1851–1927)
- Pope Leo II, bishop of Rome (611–683)

=== Sport ===
- Tony Cairoli, motocross world champion (born 1985)
- Vincenzo Nibali, cyclist (born 1984)
- Antonio Stelitano, Italian footballer (born 1987)
- Antonino Ragusa, Italian footballer (born 1990)

=== Researchers, academics ===
- Aristocles of Messene, peripatetic philosopher (1st century AD)
- Dicaearchus, Greek philosopher and mathematician (350 BC—323 BC)
- Caio Domenico Gallo, historian (1697–1780)
- Francesco Maurolico, astronomer, mathematician and humanist (1494–1575)
- Agostino Scilla, painter, paleontologist, geologist and pioneer in the study of fossils (1629–1700)
- Giuseppe Seguenza, naturalist and geologist (1833–1889)
- Giuseppe Sergi, anthropologist and psychologist (1841–1936)
- Michele Parrinello, physicist (born 1945)
- Gaetano Martino, scientist (1900–1967)
- Ettore Cordiano, Fiat engineering director (1923-1998)

=== Others ===
- Stefano D'Arrigo, writer (1919–1992)
- Guido delle Colonne, judge and writer (13th century)
- Santi Visalli, American photographer and photojournalist (born 1932)

== See also ==
- Messina Grand Prix held between 1959 and 1961
- Zanclean Age of the Pliocene Epoch in geology, named for Zancle, ancient Messina
- Messinian Age of the Miocene Epoch in geology, named for Messina

== Bibliography ==
=== in English ===
- William Smith, ed. (1872) [1854]. "Messana". Dictionary of Greek and Roman Geography. London: John Murray. hdl:2027/hvd.ah5cur.
- John Ramsay McCulloch (1877), "Messina", A Dictionary, Practical, Theoretical, and Historical, of Commerce and Commercial Navigation, Hugh G. Reid, ed., London: Longmans, Green, and Co., hdl:2027/njp.32101079877088
- "Messina". Chambers's Encyclopaedia. London. 1901. hdl:2027/njp.32101065312926.
- Ismar Elbogen (1904), "Messina", Jewish Encyclopedia, vol. 8, New York, hdl:2027/mdp.49015002282243
- "Messina", Southern Italy and Sicily (15th ed.), Leipzig: Karl Baedeker, 1908 + 1867 ed.
- Ashby, Thomas (1910). "Messina" . Encyclopædia Britannica. Vol. 18 (11th ed.). pp. 194–195.
- Benjamin Vincent (1910), "Messina", Haydn's Dictionary of Dates (25th ed.), London: Ward, Lock & Co., hdl:2027/uc2.ark:/13960/t41r6xh8t
- Roy Domenico (2002). "Sicily: Messina". Regions of Italy: a Reference Guide to History and Culture. Greenwood. pp. 287+. ISBN 0313307334.
- Christopher Kleinhenz, ed. (2004). "Messina". Medieval Italy: an Encyclopedia. Routledge. pp. 705+. ISBN 0415939291.

=== in Italian ===
- Cajo Domenico Gallo (1756). Annali della citta si Messina (in Italian). Francesco Gaipa.
- Guida per la cittá di Messina (in Italian) (2nd ed.). Giuseppe Fiumara. 1841.
- "Messina". Nuova Enciclopedia Italiana (in Italian). Vol. 13 (6th ed.). Torino: Unione Tipografico-Editrice Torinese. 1882. hdl:2027/uc1.c2649811.
- "Messina". Guida generale di Sicilia e Malta: storica, artistica, commerciale (in Italian) (3rd ed.). Catania: Niccolò Giannotta. 1889.
- "Messina". Sicilia. Guida d'Italia (in Italian). Milan: Touring Club Italiano. 1919. p. 96+. hdl:2027/uc1.$b535988.
- Paolo Militello (2008). Ritratti di città in Sicilia e a Malta: XVI-XVII secolo (in Italian). Palermo: Officina di Studi Medievali. ISBN 978-88-88615-78-3.
