= Caio Domenico Gallo =

Italian historian

- Born: 28 February 1697; Messina, Kingdom of Sicily
- Died: 20 October 1780 (aged 83); Messina
- Occupation: historian
- Writing career
- Notable work: Gli Annali della città di Messina capitale del Regno di Sicilia dal giorno di sua fondazione fino a tempi presenti

Caio Domenico Gallo (28 February 1697 – 20 October 1780), was an Italian historian. Gallo was born and died in Messina, in the north-east of the Mediterranean island of Sicily. His principal work, the Annali della città di Messina, is a comprehensive history of that city from its beginnings up to the time of the plague of 1743. It was published in four volumes, of which only two appeared during his lifetime, in 1756 and 1758. The third volume was published posthumously in 1804, and the fourth in 1875. Two volumes of later history, by Gaetano Oliva, were added in 1896.

== Publications ==
- Gli Annali della città di Messina capitale del Regno di Sicilia dal giorno di sua fondazione fino a tempi presenti, four volumes, 1756–1875
