= Bordonaro =

Bordonaro is a surname. Notable people with the surname include:

- Antonio Chiaramonte Bordonaro (1877–1932), Italian diplomat
- Martín Bordonaro (born 1988), Argentine footballer
- Molly Bordonaro (fl. 1990s–2000s), American businesswoman and diplomat
- Tom J. Bordonaro Jr. (born 1959), American politician
