= Belvedere dello Stretto =

Proposed viewing platforms of Messina Strait, Italy

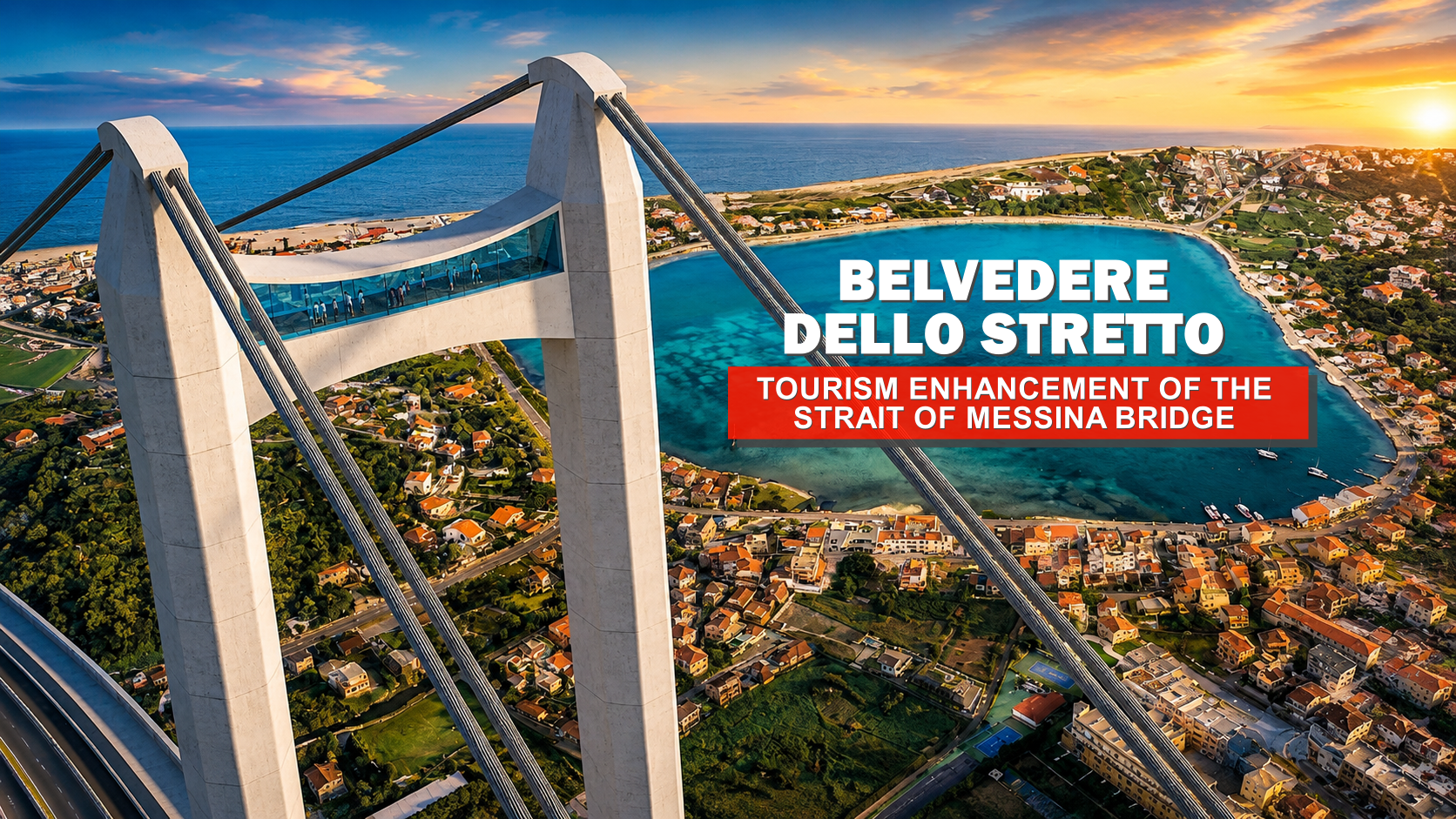
- A Belvedere rendering
- Interactive map of the Belvedere dello Stretto area

General information
- Status: Proposed
- Type: Observation deck
- Location: Strait of Messina, Torre Faro, Messina (Sicily side); Cannitello, Villa San Giovanni, (Calabria side)
- Coordinates: 38°15′45″N 15°37′54″E
- Construction started: March 2027 (extimated)

Height
- Height: 374 metres (1,227 ft); 249 metres (817 ft); 123 metres (404 ft)

Design and construction
- Developer: Webuild, Italy
- Structural engineer: COWI, Denmark
- Civil engineer: Giuseppe Palamara
- Main contractor: Webuild, Italy

Other information
- Public transit: Strait of Messina Bridge

Website
- Belvedere dello Stretto

The Belvedere dello Stretto (English: Belvedere of the Strait) are six panoramic observatories to be located in the towers of the Strait of Messina Bridge, on the Sicilian and Calabrian sides, inserted in the cross-beams of the pylons and placed at heights of 123 m, 249 m and 374 m respectively.

== History ==
Pietro Ciucci, CEO of Stretto di Messina S.p.A. and head of the Messina Bridge project, when interviewed by Corriere della Sera on February 21, 2024, was asked: “What do you mean by tourism enhancement?”

He replied verbatim:

We are considering panoramic viewpoints with observation decks and belvederes at a height of 250 meters on both towers. Also under consideration is the construction of a cycle path to cross the Strait.

— Pietro Ciucci, Corriee della Sera, 21 February 2024

== The Concept and Design ==
The Designer’s Report

On March 14, 2024, Stretto di Messina S.p.A. made the designer’s report public. On page 417, the idea of enhancing the Bridge as a tourist attraction was introduced for the first time. The report mentions a panoramic belvedere located at the third crossbeam and on both towers, at a height of 374 meters.

3.5.1.10 Architectural Design of the Belvedere

As requested by Società Stretto di Messina during the meeting of 27 November 2023, recorded in minutes CS_005, the General Contractor shall further develop, during the Executive Design phase, a feasibility study concerning public panoramic access within both towers of the Crossing Structure.

The concept shall provide visitor access inside the structure either through service elevators reconfigured for this purpose or through additional elevators. The panoramic access point shall be located at the second or third crossbeam level.

The feasibility study shall necessarily take into account parameters such as visitor comfort (vibrations), infrastructure and public safety, landscape considerations, as well as structural and functional aspects. In any case, the surrounding conditions shall remain unchanged, including the fundamental characteristics (geometry and materials) of the tower legs.

Economic evaluations shall be deferred to the Executive phase.

Based on the above considerations, the following preliminary design concept is proposed.

— IL PROGETTISTA: Dott. Ing. Marco Orlandini, Ordine Ingegneri Roma n° 14340, From page 417 of the Designer's Report, 14 March 2024

Tourism enhancement of the cross-elements

Palamara conceived a strategic vision for the "Tourism enhancement of the cross-elements" (valorizzazione turistica dei trasversi) in February 2024. The project proposes transforming the structural cross-beams (transversal beams) of the bridge's deck into observatory decks or functional spaces for international tourism. This concept was officially presented to the Bridge Commission at Palazzo Zanca on 29 November 2024, emphasizing the bridge not only as a transport link but as a standalone destination (destination-bridge).

The preliminary design was developed by Webuild, project developed in dialogue with the technical proposals of engineer Giuseppe Palamara, while the Danish firm COWI, as was also the case for the executive design of the Messina Bridge project, is responsible for the detailed structural design and wind tunnel testing.

== See also ==
- Strait of Messina Bridge
- Stretto di Messina
- Webuild
- COWI
- Marco Orlandini
