= Giorgio Diana =

Italian engineer, academic, writer

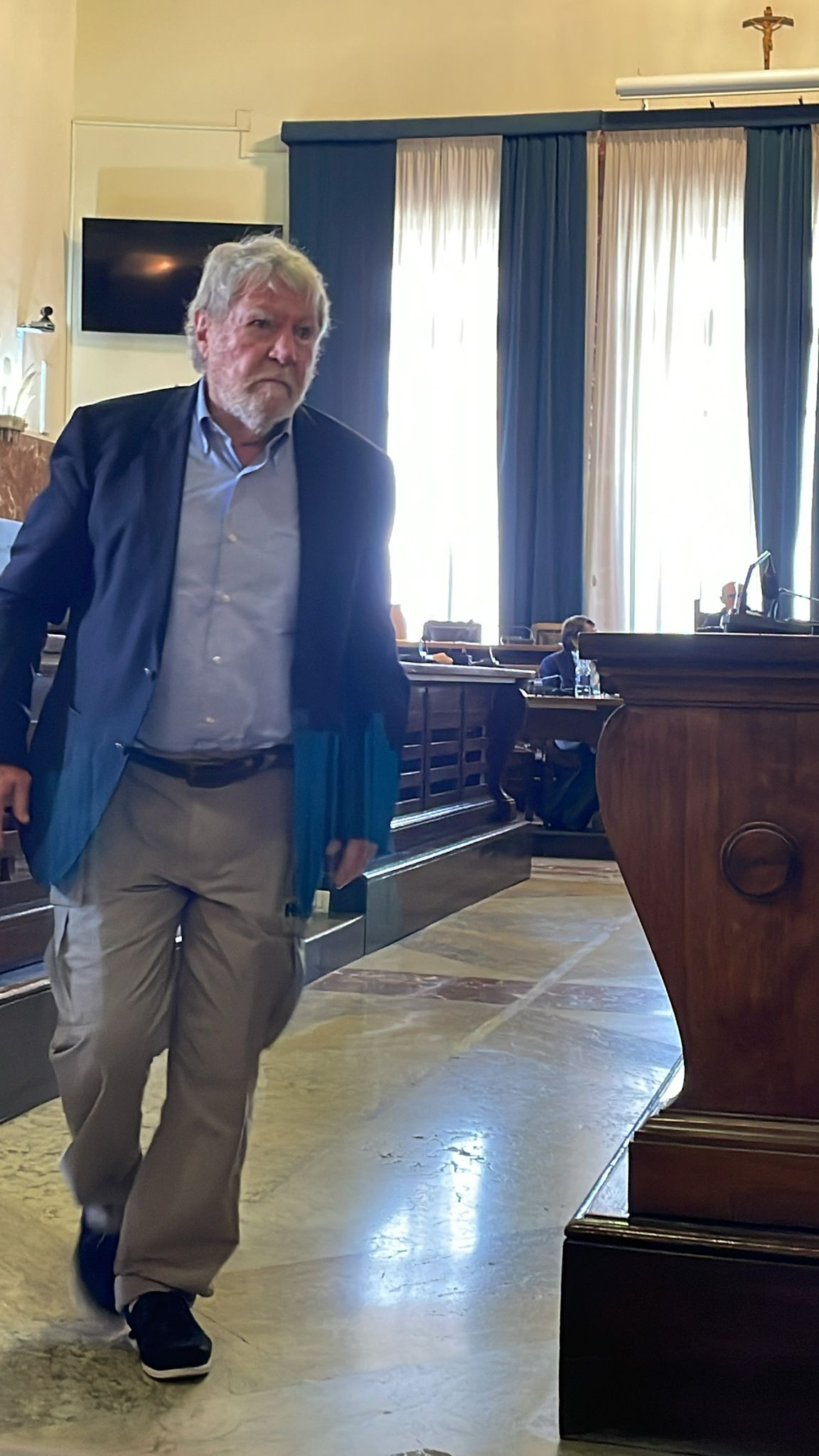
- Diana in 2024 at 87.
- Born: 27 September 1936 (age 90); Blevio, Italy
- Education: Polytechnic University of Milan
- Engineering career
- Projects: Strait of Messina Bridge; Stonecutters Bridge

Giorgio Diana (born 27 September 1936) is an Italian engineer, writer, and professor of Applied Mechanics at the Department of Mechanical Engineering of the Polytechnic University of Milan.

== Biography ==
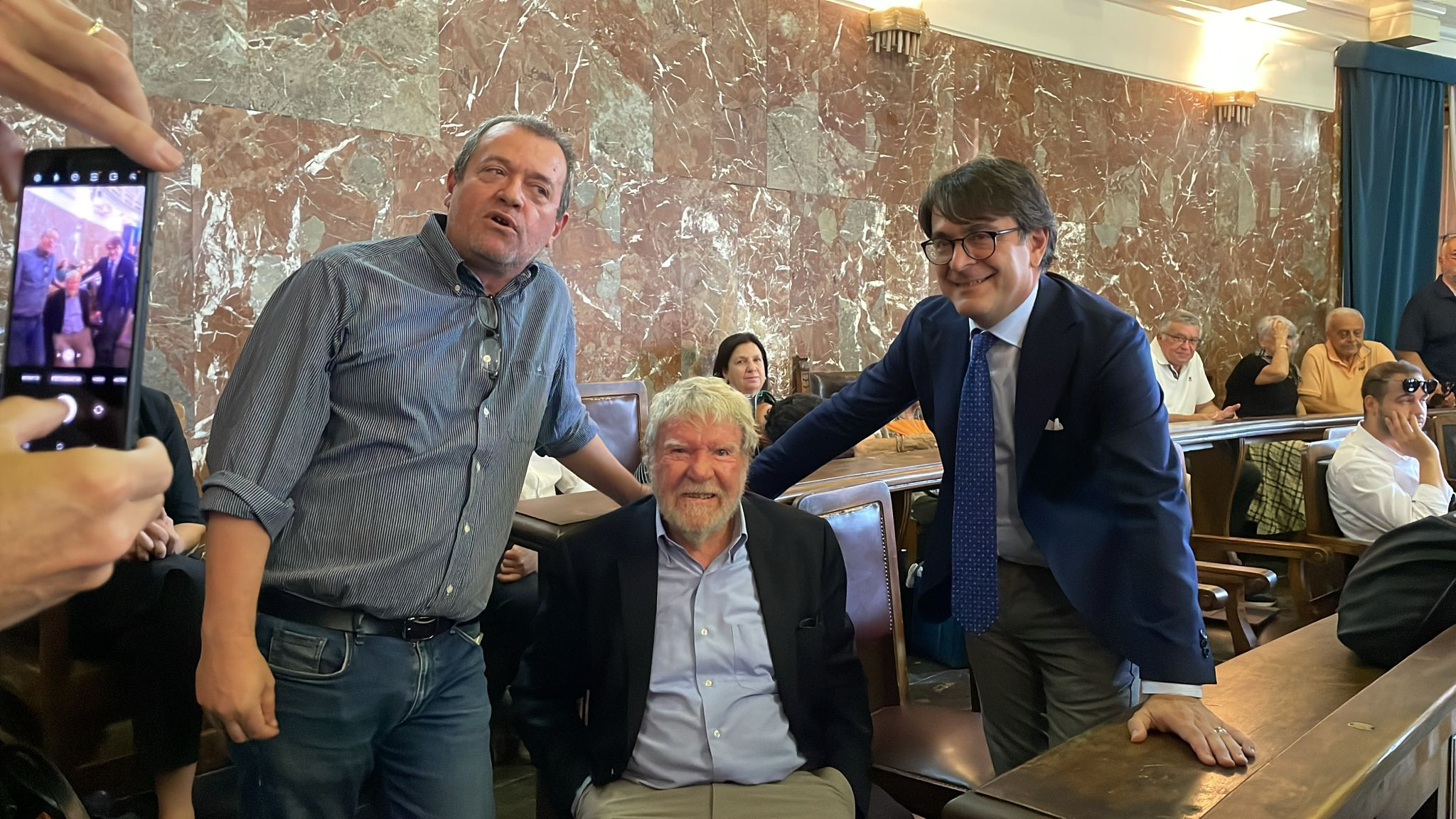
Diana (center) in Messina in 2024.

In 1961, Diana graduated in Mechanical Engineering at Polytechnic University of Milan, Italy.

== Career ==
Diana designed aspects of the Strait of Messina Bridge related to aeroelastics and the bridge's proposed road-rail functionality. He has carried out Aerodynamic and aeroelastic analysis for the projects of the Stonecutters Bridge (Hong-Kong), Talavera (Spain), Adige (Italy). He carried out analyses of wind-induced vibrations and design of damping systems for some of the largest overhead power lines in the world, including the Orinoco Crossing (Venezuela), Lake Maracaibo Crossing (Venezuela), Gheshm Strait Crossing (Iran), Yangtze River Crossing (China). He has also carried out analyses of wind-induced vibrations on cables and design of damping systems for the British Airways London Eye (UK), Beijing Great Wheel (China), and Great Berlin Wheel (Germany) projects.

In sport, Diana worked on optimization of sail plans for the Oracle America's Cup team (USA), 2008–2009.

== Books ==
Diana has written several books, most often on the subject of the Messina Bridge.

- Diana, Giorgio; Brancaleoni, Fabio; Faccioli, Ezio; Fiammenghi, Giuseppe (2009). The Messina Strait Bridge: A Challenge and a Dream. Rome: CRC Press. ISBN 9780415468145.
- Diana, Giorgio (2018). Modelling of Vibrations of Overhead Line Conductors: Assessment of the Technology. Berlin: Springer. ISBN 9783319728087.
- Diana, Giorgio; Cheli, Federico (2015). Advanced Dynamics of Mechanical Systems. Berlin: Springer. ISBN 9783319181998.
- Diana, Giorgio; Fossati, Fabio (2000). Principi di funzionamento di un'imbarcazione a vela. Hamburg: Spiegel. ISBN 9788876601583.

== Awards ==
During his career, Diana received the following awards.

- ICARO Award (2007), by University of A Coruña, Spain
- Robert H. Scanlan Medal (2009) by American Society of Civil Engineers, Reston, Virginia, US
- The CIGRE SC B2 Technical Committee Award (2012) by International Council on Large Electric Systems, Paris, France
- The European Railway Award (2014) by Community of European Railway and Infrastructure Companies, Brussels, Belgium

== See also ==
- Claudio Borri
- Bill Brown
