= Pietro Ciucci =

Italian businessman (born 1950)

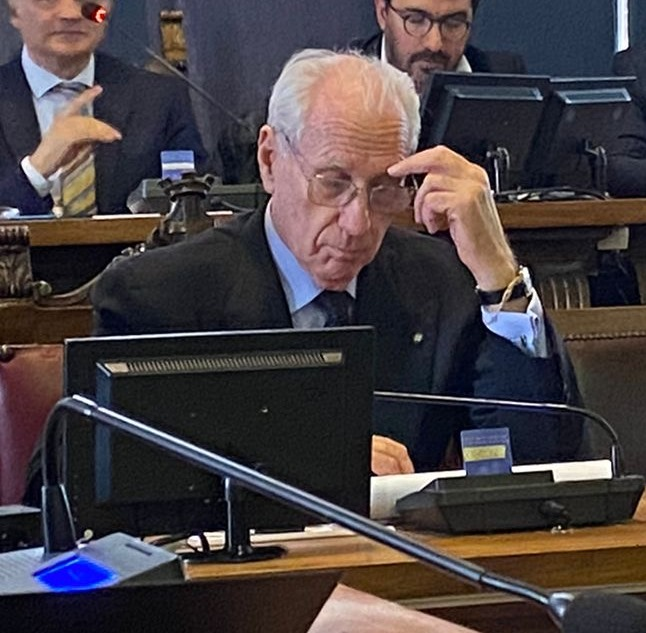
- Ciucci in Messina in 2024.
- Born: 24 October 1950 (age 75); Rome, Italy
- Occupation: Businessman
- Title: President, ANAS

Pietro Ciucci (born 24 October 1950) is an Italian businessman, CEO of Stretto di Messina and former ANAS President.

== Biography ==
Pietro Ciucci was born in 1950 in Rome. He studied Economics and Commerce at the University of Rome. In April 1987, he received the position of Central Co-Director of the Finance Department at IRI. Also in IRI, Pietro Ciucci, in March 1993, was instead appointed General Manager. From June 2000 to November 2002, Ciucci was a member of the IRI Board of Liquidators. He oversaw the company's economic recovery plan and subsequently followed the sale of the main companies of the IRI group to private individuals. He was on the board of directors of the Banca Popolare di Roma. He also held the position of President of ANAS and CEO of the Strait of Messina company until 2012.

== See also ==
- Stretto di Messina
- Strait of Messina Bridge
