= Gianluca Valensise =

Italian geologist (born 1958)

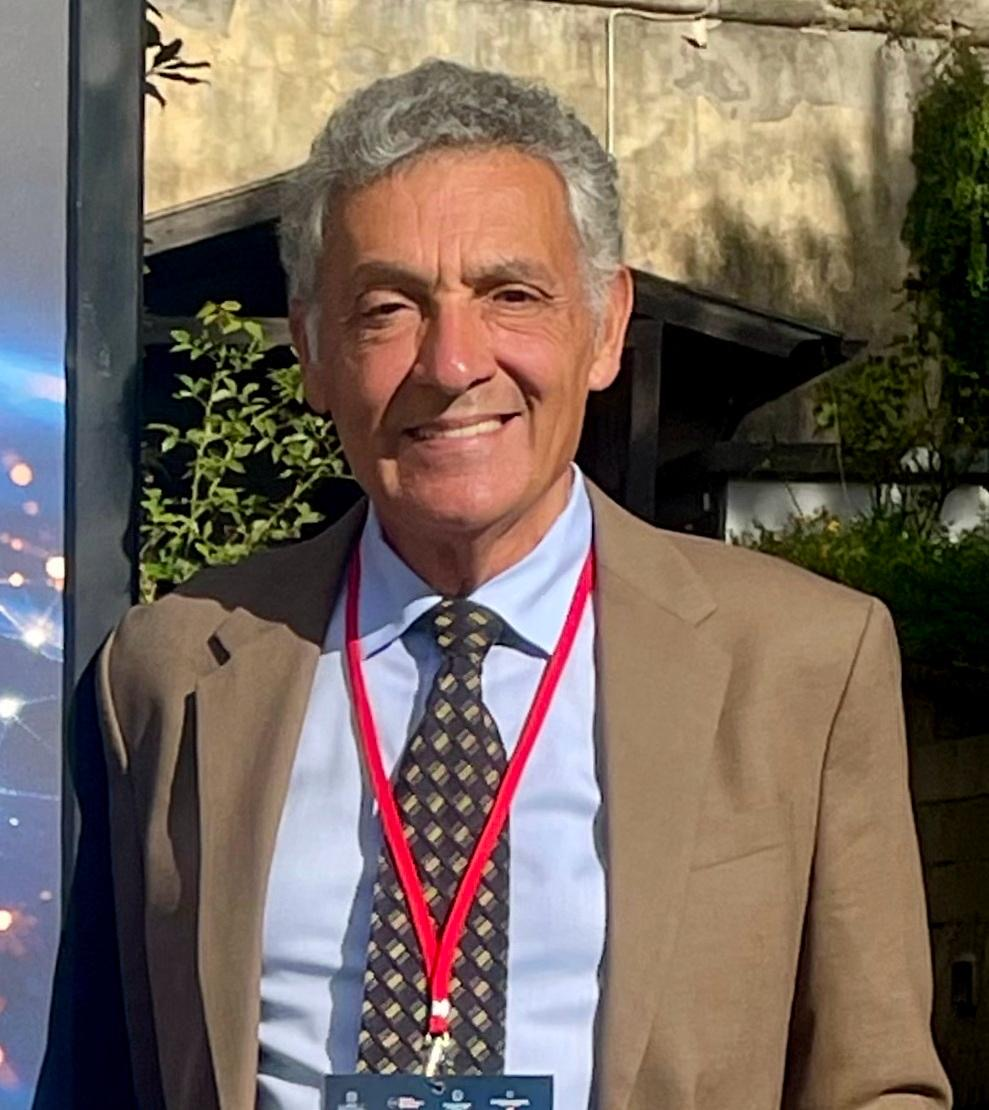
- Valensise in 2025
- Born: 27 December 1958 (age 67); Rome, Italy
- Known for: crystal structure solution; Seismology; Strait of Messina Bridge
- Awards: SIGEA-APS Award 2021
- Scientific career
- Fields: Geology; Seismology
- Workplaces: Sapienza University of Rome, Italy

Gianluca Valensise (born 27 December 1958) is an Italian geologist and seismologist.

== Biography ==
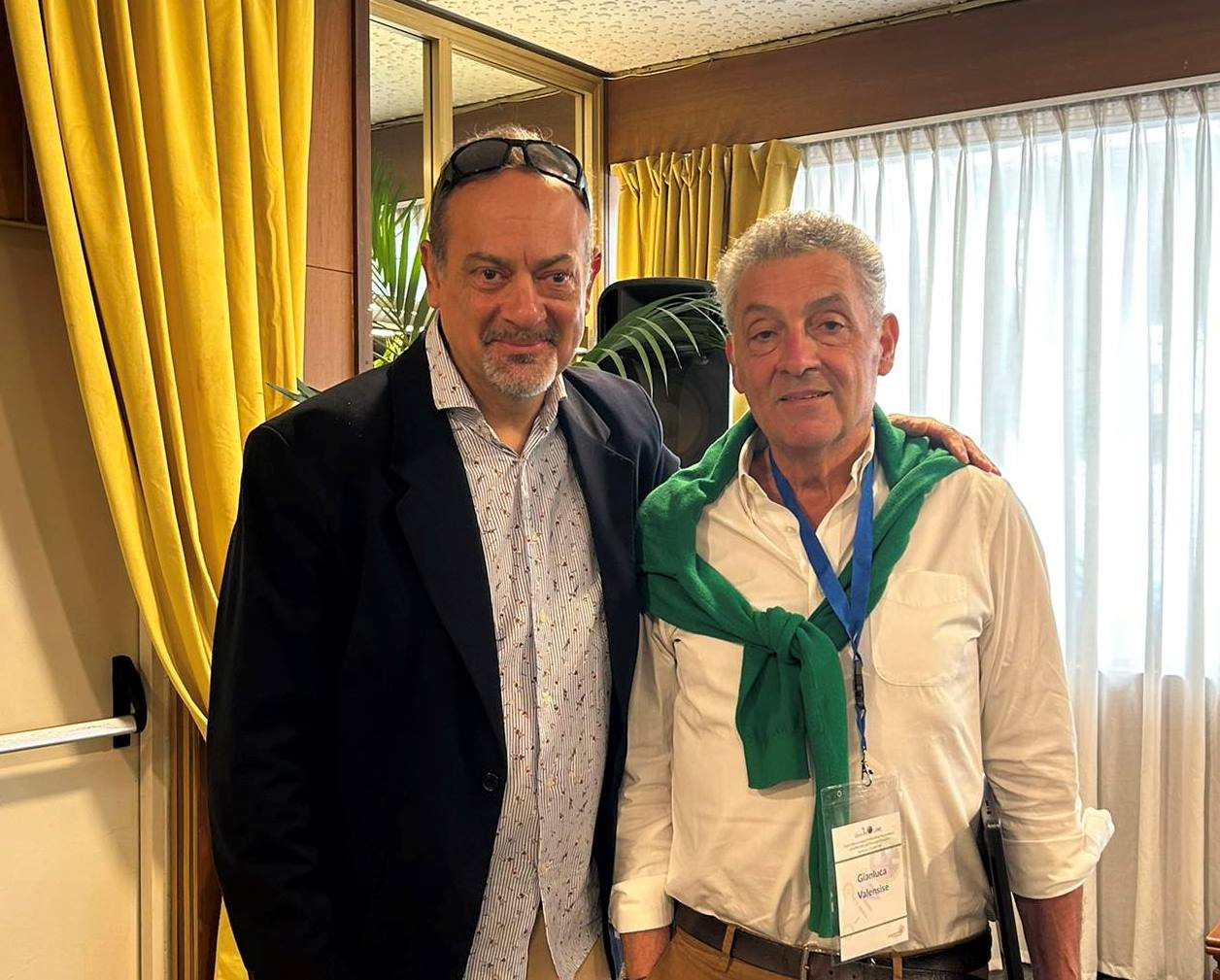
Valensise (right) with engineer Giuseppe Palamara at Geo-INQUIRE 2026 in Messina.

Born on 27 December 1958 in Rome, Italy, Valensise graduated in Geological Sciences from the Sapienza University of Rome in 1982 and obtained a PhD in Solid Earth Geophysics from the same university in 1987.

He has worked at the National Institute of Geophysics and Volcanology (INGV) since 1983, becoming Research Director in the Seismology and Tectonophysics Section in 1997.

== Career ==
Valensise is a senior member of the DISS Working Group and one of the main developers of the Database of Individual Seismogenic Sources (DISS), a key tool for seismic hazard assessment in Italy and surrounding regions.

He has held visiting positions at the University of California, Santa Cruz (1987–1989), the U.S. Geological Survey in Menlo Park (1990) and the University of Southern California (1992).

In April 2026 he was among the speakers at the conference “From Data to Hazard Modelling (Hackathon), Earthquake and Tsunami Cascades” which was held in Messina, Italy.

== Research ==
Valensise has had numerous international collaborations, especially with University of Southern California. His main research focuses on the relationship between active faults, paleoseismology and historical seismicity, with particular attention to the creation and maintenance of the DISS database and the Catalogue of Strong Earthquakes in Italy and the Mediterranean (CFTI).

== Recognition ==
Valensise’s research has been widely cited in the international scientific community (about 12,000 citations on Google Scholar) and has contributed significantly to the understanding of active tectonics and seismic hazard in Italy.

== Strait of Messina Bridge ==
A longtime consultant for the Strait of Messina Bridge, he has been repeatedly called upon to clarify debated aspects of the Straits' seismotectonics reported by the press, sometimes even by fellow geologists. In particular, he was requested to debunk unverified theories regarding other dangerous faults detected in the Strait of Messina, in addition to the only officially recognized fault that caused the 1908 Messina earthquake.

Awards for his research include:

- SIGEA-APS Award 2021

== Books ==
- Boschi, Enzo; Ferrari, Graziano; Gasperini, Paolo; Guidoboni, Emanuela; Smriglio, Giuseppe; Valensise, Gianluca (1995). Catalogo dei Forti Terremoti in Italia dal 461 a.C. al 1980. Bologna: I.N.G.-S.G.A. - Storia Geofisica Ambiente. p. 973. ISBN 8885213073.
- Boschi, Enzo; Guidoboni, Emanuela; Ferrari, Graziano; Gasperini, Paolo; Valensise, Gianluca (1997). Catalogo dei Forti Terremoti in Italia dal 461 a.C. al 1990. Bologna: I.N.G.-S.G.A. - Storia Geofisica Ambiente. ISBN 8885213081.
- Bertolaso, Guido; Boschi, Enzo; Guidoboni, Emanuela; Valensise, Gianluca (2008). Il terremoto e il maremoto del 28 dicembre 1908. Bologna: SGA - Storia Geofisica Ambiente. ISBN 9788885213159.
- Azzaro, Raffaele; Piccione, Caterina; Valensise, Gianluca (2008). Terremoto Calabro Messinese 1908/2008. Florence: Alinari-Sole 24 Ore editore. ISBN 9788863020205.
- Valensise, Gianluca; Brancaleoni, Fabio; Faccioli, Ezio; Fiammenghi, Giuseppe; Diana, Giorgio (2009). The Messina Strait Bridge: A Challenge and a Dream. Rome: CRC Press. ISBN 9780415468145.
- Guidoboni, Emanuela; Valensise, Gianluca (2012). Il peso economico e sociale dei disastri sismici in Italia negli ultimi 150 anni. Bologna: Bononia University Press. ISBN 9788873956839.
- Guidoboni, Emanuela; Valensise, Gianluca (2013). L'Italia dei disastri. Dati e riflessioni sull'impatto degli eventi naturali 1861-2013. Bologna: Bononia University Press. ISBN 9788873959045.
- Guidoboni, Emanuela; Valensise, Gianluca (2022). Atlante. L'azzardo sismico delle città. Il Sud. Roma: Fondazione CNI. ISBN 9788860140920.
- Guidoboni, Emanuela; Valensise, Gianluca (2023). Atlante. L'azzardo sismico delle città. Il Centro e il Nord. Roma: Fondazione CNI. ISBN 9788860140937.
