= Claudio Borri =

Italian engineer, academic, writer

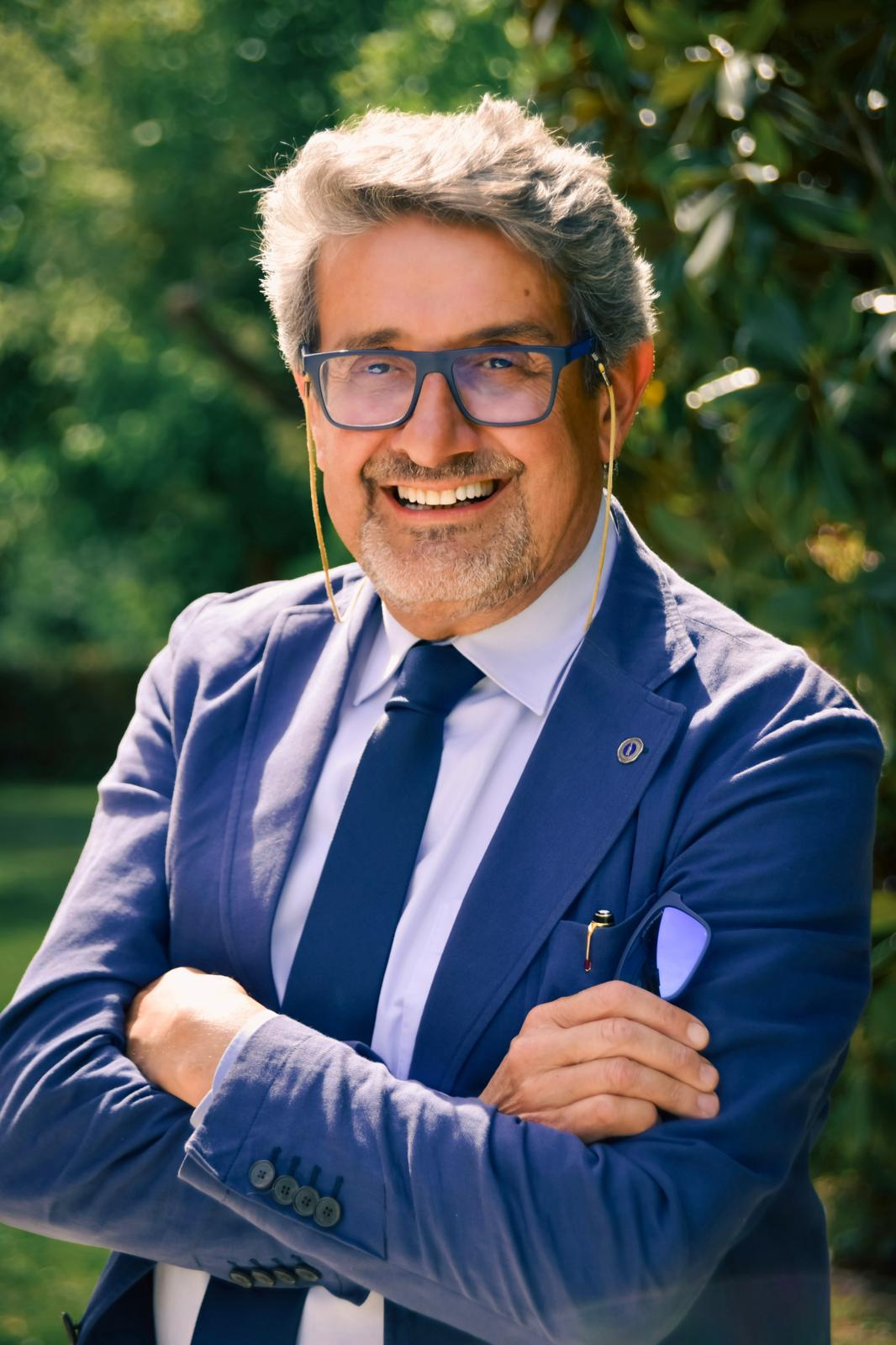
- Borri in 2026.
- Born: 3 October 1953 (age 72); Figline Valdarno, Italy
- Education: University of Florence

Claudio Borri (born 3 October 1953) is an Italian civil/structural engineer, academic, professional consultant & Professor Emeritus at University of Florence since November 2023. After 2001 he became Full professor of Continuum/Structural Mechanics and Strength of Materials (Construction Science), Chair of Computational Mechanics and Wind Engineering at the Department of Civil and Environmental Engineering of the University of Florence.

Prof. Borri has served as President of the European Soc. for Engineering Education (SEFI, Brussels, 2005-07) and of IFEES (Int. Federation of EE Societies, Washington DC, 2006-08). In August 2023 he was elected as President of IAWE (int. Association for Wind Engineering.

== Biography ==
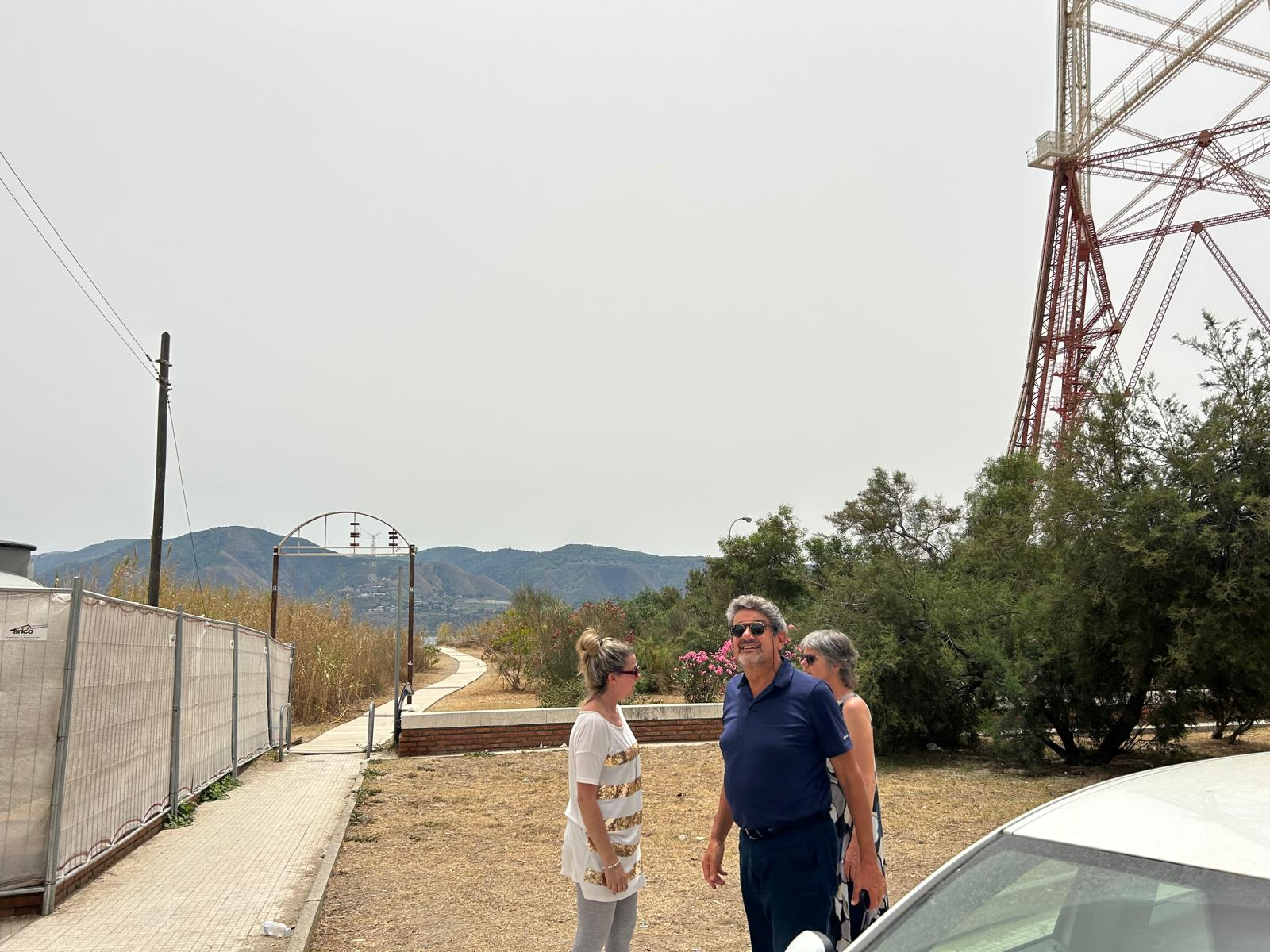
Borri under Messina Pylon in 2024.

Claudio Borri started his academic studies of Civil Engineering at University of Florence, Italy and then at Ruhr University Bochum, Germany. He graduated in Florence in 1978 and in 1983 in Bochum he obtained his doctorate in Structural Mechanics, became associate professor and then Full Prof. of Structural Mechanics with the Chair of Wind Engineering at the Faculty of Engineering,University of Florence.

In 1991 Prof. Borri was co-founder the first Italian Inter-university Research Center for Building Aerodynamics and Wind Engineering (in Italian the acronym is CRIACIV) was established between University of Rome "La Sapienza" and University of Florence, of which he became Director in 2004, holding this position until 2012, when he was elected Dean & Head (Direttore) of Civil and Environmental Engineering Dept. (in Italian the acronym is DICEA), of the University of Florence (until 2017).

In 1999/2000 he also set-up and Coordinated (with Prof. Udo Peil) the International-joined PhD school & programme on "Risk management on the built environment" (later on: Civil and Environmental Engineering) with a joined degree with TU-Braunschweig in Germany (co-financed by the Italian Ministry MIUR and the German DFG).

== Career ==
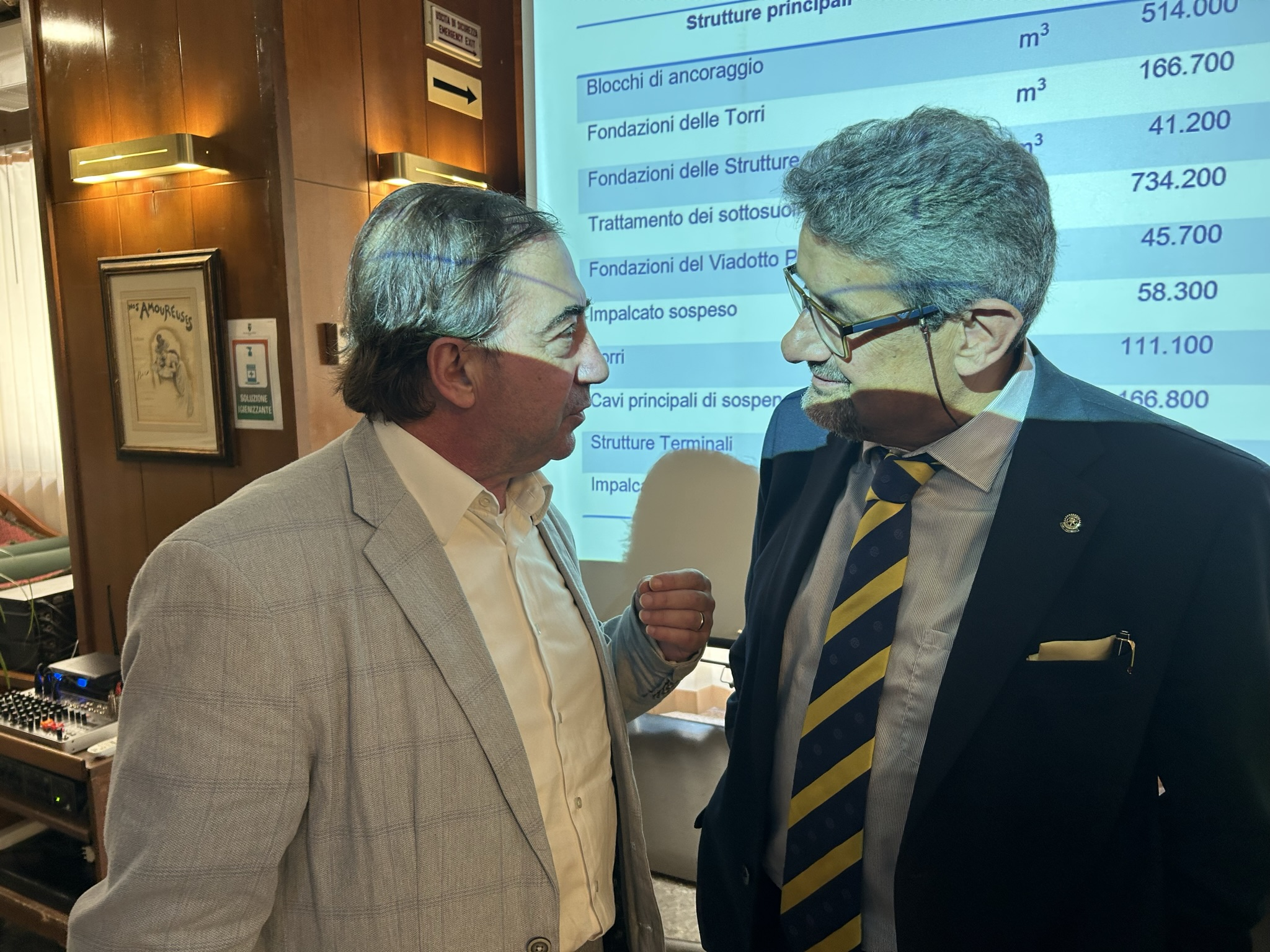
Borri (right) in Messina in 2023.

Appointed by Ministry of Infrastructure and Transportation as Member of the scientific committee of the Stretto di Messina S.p.A., the mandatary company for the construction of the Strait of Messina Bridge, from 2009 to 2011 and again from 2023 onwards.

Chairman of the 16th edition of the International Conference on Wind Engineering (ICWE) which took place in Florence from 27 to 31 August 2023. Director of the CRIACIV from 2004 to 2012 (Centro Interuniversitario di Aerodinamica delle Costruzioni e Ingegneria del Vento in english language Inter-University Research Centre on Building Aerodynamics and Wind Engineering).

As a structural engineer Prof. Borri has performed several tenths of structural engineering consultancies for shell structures, wind effects on large buildings and structures (such as television towers and antennas, large roofs, tall buildings, bridges and walkways), large wind turbines and wind energy structures, either as designer, construction leader or static testing check engineer. He has also carried out official Official technical consultant (CTU) for trials in different courts in Italy and Germany, in cases of damages or collapses of buildings or structural elements, affected on construction sites (construction of wind farms, tunnels, new roads).

== Works ==
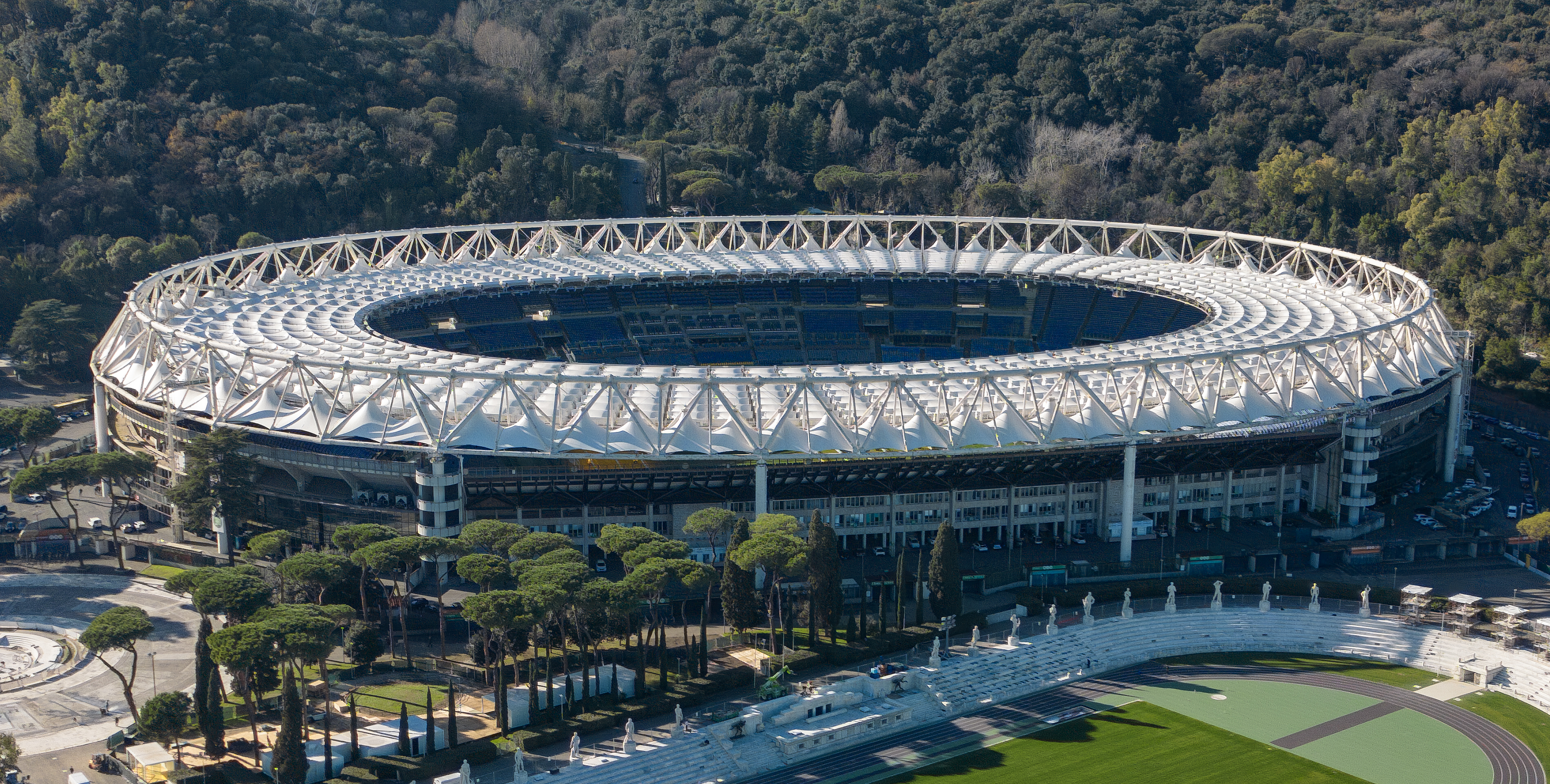
The roof of the Stadio Olimpico in a 2024 shot.

In 1989 Borri was a consultant of Prof. M. Majowiecki (designer) and participated in the project of the new roof of the Olympic Stadium in Rome, taking care of the 3D numerical dynamic-nonlinear analysis under the action of turbulent winds.

In 1998 he was Chief consulting and design activity in wind engineering, aerodynamics and structural design. in the Santa Palomba transmitter and related infrastructures (cable bridges, smaller tower, etc.) project in Pomezia, Rome for the RAI (Italian Broadcasting Corp.); General contractor: Thomcast AG, Tuergi/CH; Struct. Engrg. by Thomcast GmbH, Mannheim).

After 2008 (till 2018) Prof. Borri was Chief designer leading a technical group for development, construction and static testing of about 160 large sized wind turbines (82m rotor diameter, hub height 84-98m) in about 20 large wind farms in Italy (Gen. Contractor: ENERCON GmbH). In 2014, in the project pedestrian crossing of the Terni railway station (also known as Umbria Getaway), he deals with aerodynamic and aeroelastic tests in the wind tunnel.

In 2021 he participated in the renovation project of the Stadio Artemio Franchi in Florence as an aerodynamics and structures consultant.. After 2024 Prof. is coordinating a design team for the new bridge and short viaduct by passing Asciano historic town center (Siena).

== Conferences ==
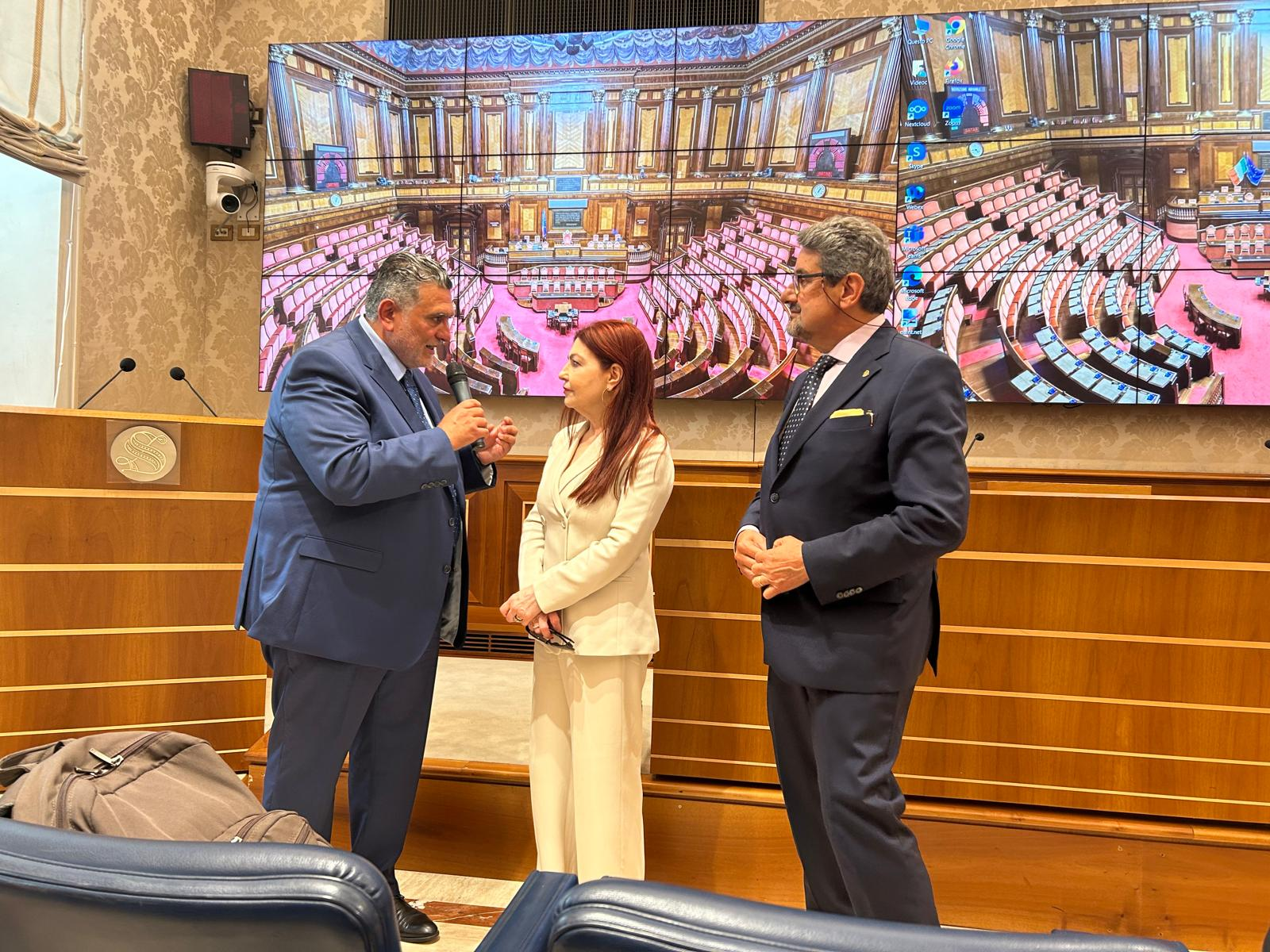
Borri (first from right) in Rome at Palazzo Madama at the presentation of the website Pontesullostrettonews in June 2023.

Professor Borri was president of the Italian national conference on wind engineering in 1990 (IN-VENTO-90), then in 1996 Europaean Dynamics (EURODYN 1996), in 2002 European Society for Engineering Education (SEFI 2002), in 2005 the Italian Association of Theoretical and Applied Mechanics (in Italian the acronym is AIMETA 2005) and then in 2009 the European African Conference on Wind Engineering (EACWE 2009).

In 2023 he was President of International Conference on Wind Engineering (ICWE16), an important conference on wind engineering which in 2023 was held for the first time in Italy in Florence. Also in 2023 Borri was appointed President of the International Association for Wind Engineering (IAWE in Italian), a position he will hold until 2027.

== Books ==
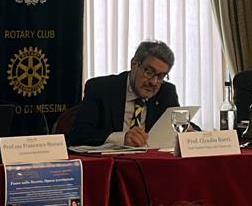
Borri during a congress in 2023.

Professor Claudio Borri has authored or co-authored more than 400 scientific papers and book chapters, including hundreds of articles published in leading peer-reviewed journals. He has also edited or co-edited more than a dozen special issues of major journals in engineering education, structural mechanics and wind engineering. In addition, he has written or edited numerous books, most of them devoted to the fields of wind engineering, wind loads and wind effects on structures. Among his principal publications are:

- Augusti, Giuliano; Borri, Claudio; Spinelli, Paolo (1996). Structural Dynamics: Proceedings of EURODYN '96, 3rd European Conference on Structural Dynamics. Balkema.
- Borri, Claudio; Weck, Tor-Ulf (2002). The Renaissance Engineer of Tomorrow. Florence: Polistampa.
- Van Beeck, Jeroen; Borri, Claudio (2004). Impact of Wind and Storm on City Life and Built Environment. von Karman Institute for Fluid Dynamics. ISBN 2930389117.
- Borri, Claudio; Facchini, Luca; Federici, Giorgio; Primicerio, Mario (2005). AIMETA 2005: Atti del XVII Congresso Nazionale di Meccanica Teorica e Applicata. Florence: Firenze University Press.
- Borri, Claudio; Briganti, Daniele (2006). L'ingegneria del vento: Un'antica, modernissima scienza. Florence: Firenze University Press.
- Borri, Claudio; Pastò, Stefano (2007). Lezioni di ingegneria del vento. Florence: Firenze University Press. ISBN 9788892738966.
- Borri, Claudio; Betti, Michele; Marino, Enzo (2008). Lectures on Solid Mechanics. Florence: Firenze University Press. ISBN 9788884538536.
- Borri, Claudio; Augusti, Giuliano; Bartoli, Gianni; Facchini, Luca (2009). Proceedings of the 5th European and African Conference on Wind Engineering. Florence: Firenze University Press.
- Borri, Claudio; Tesi, Alberto (2009). Formazione e la professione dell'ingegnere: qualità e accreditamento nel confronto europeo. Florence: CUES.
- Borri, Claudio; Mannini, Claudio (2010). Aeroelastic phenomena and pedestrian-structure dynamic interaction on non-conventional bridges and footbridges. Florence: Firenze University Press. ISBN 9788864532028.
- Borri, Claudio; Bartoli, Gianni; Mannini, Claudio; Marino, Enzo (2026). Proceedings of the 16th International Conference on Wind Engineering. Springer.

== Awards ==
During his career Borri received the following awards.

- 1994: Max-Planck Forschungspreis (Research Award) in Structural Mechanics, in Bonn, Germany
- 2001: Honorary degree in Engineering Sciences by the University of Sofia, Bulgaria
- 2006: Honorary degree in Wind Engineering by the University of Tallinn, Estonia
- 2010: Humboldt Alumni Award, in Berlin, Germany
- 2012: IFEES Presidential Award by IFEES, in Buenos Aires
- 2014: Nikola Tesla Golden Chain for Outstanding contributions to Engineering Education, in Dubai
- 2019: Scruton Lecturer, part of the Institution of Civil Engineers (ICE), in London

== See also ==
- Strait of Messina Bridge
- Messina Bridge technical committee
- Wind Engineering
