= Messina Type Deck =

Suspension bridge component

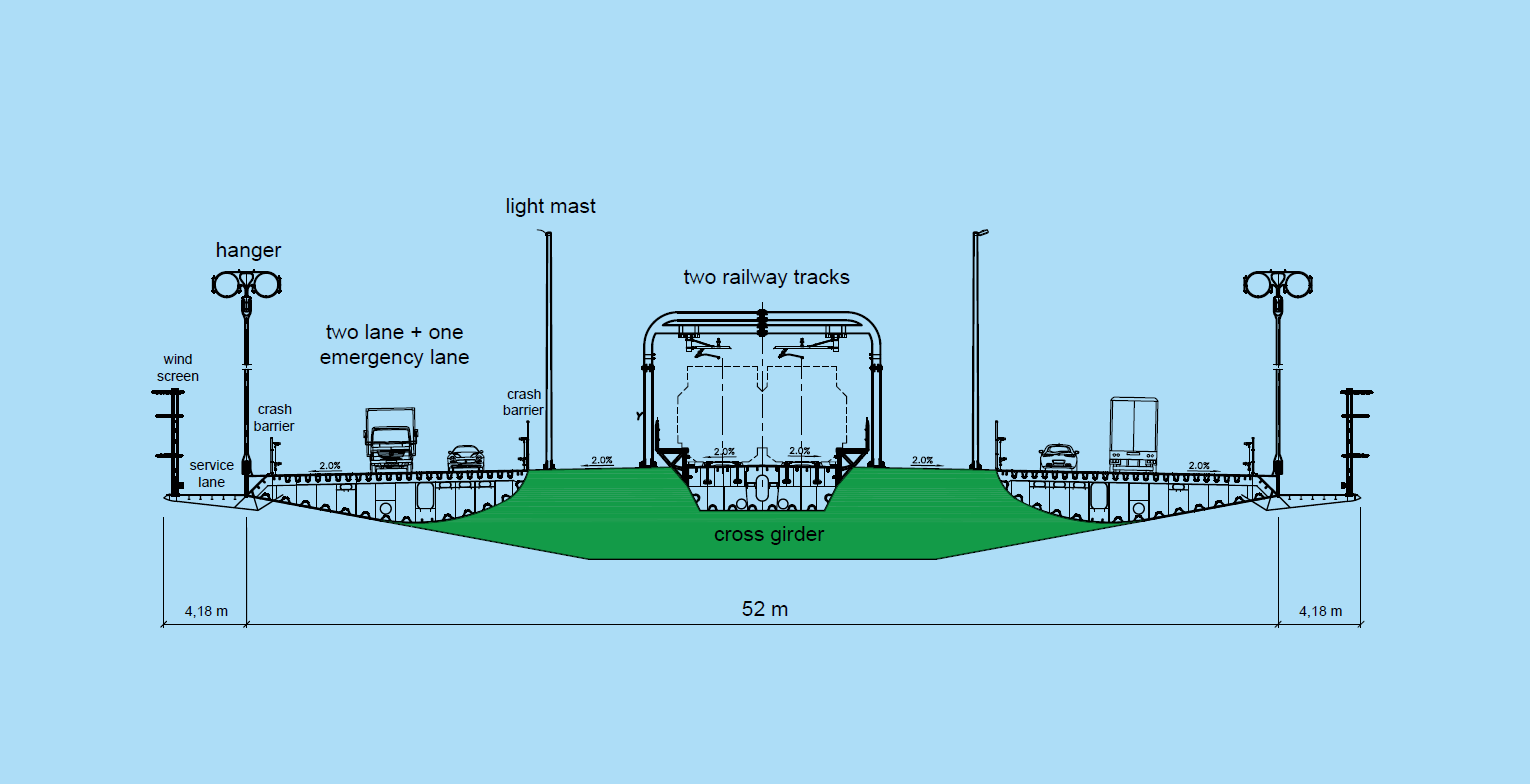
- Messina Bridge Deck cross section
- Manufacturer: Stretto di Messina S.p.A.
- Type: Bridge deck
- Released: 1992 (designed)

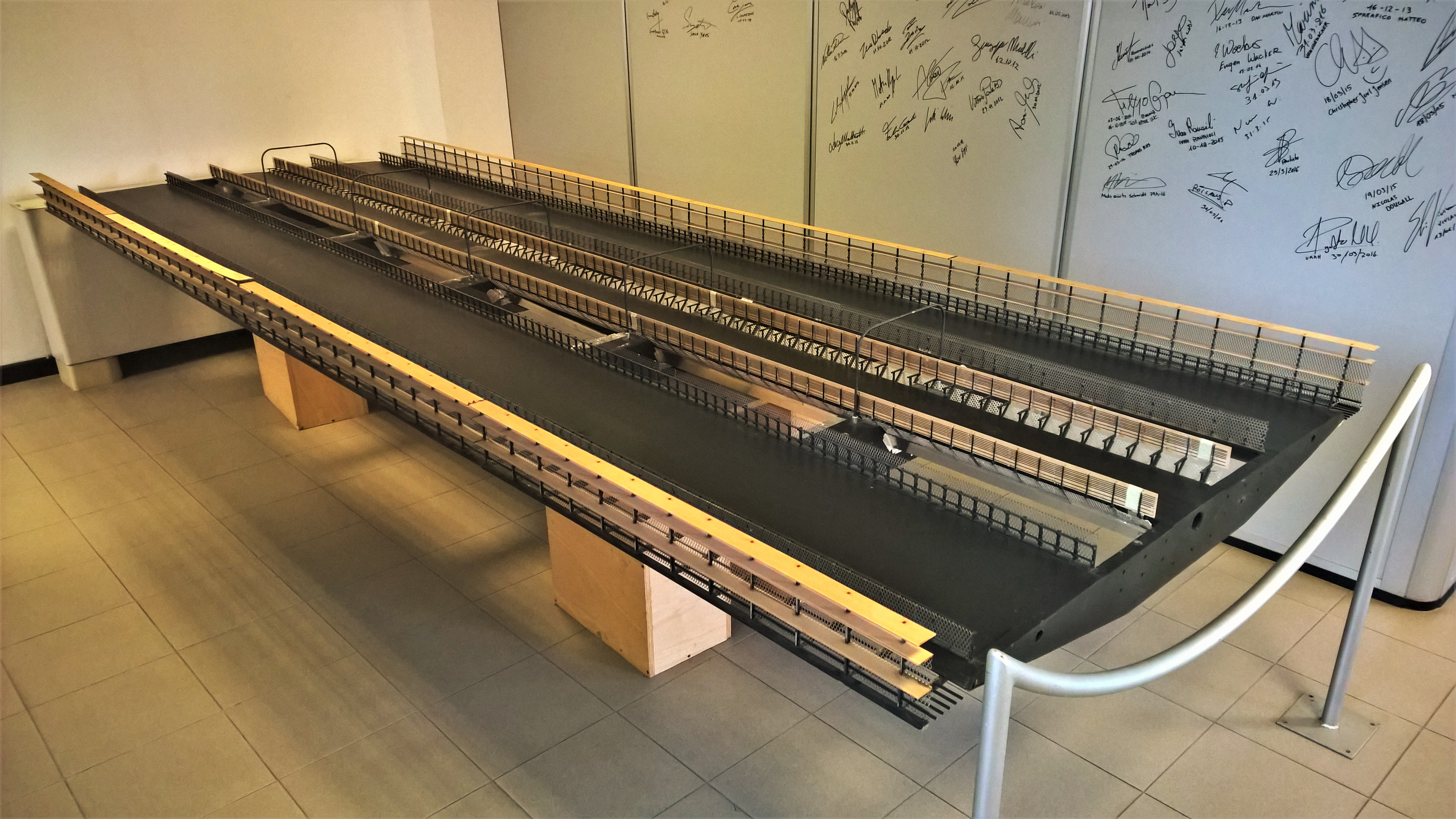
A model of the Messina Type Deck at the Polytechnic University of Milan.

The Messina Type Deck (also known as Messina Style Bridge), it is a suspension bridge deck designed by the Welsh engineer Bill Brown in 1992, of the so-called third generation wing box type, with three separate boxes (two for road and one for the railway).

== Description ==
The final approval of the Strait of Messina Bridge project was made on 6 August 2025.

=== Third-Generation Suspension Bridges ===
The third-Generation Suspension Bridges is a series of newly developed bridges inaugurated with the suspension bridge project over the Strait of Messina.

The deck section is composed of multiple airfoil-shaped boxes, separated by transparent surfaces and equipped with appropriate aerodynamic features.

Not only does it offer wind resistance, but it is also intrinsically stable against aerodynamic instability.

== Bridges built with the Messina Type Deck ==
Even before being built for the bridge for which it was designed, the Messina Type Deck has been used in various bridges around the world.

Bridge	Year	Country	Main span	Bridge Type
Xihoumen Bridge	2009	China	1650 m	Suspension bridge
Stonecutters Bridge	2009	Hong Kong	1018 m	Cable stayed bridge
Yi Sun-sin Bridge	2012	South Korea	1545 m	Suspension bridge
San Francisco–Oakland Bay Bridge (eastern span)	2013	United States	385 m	Self-anchored suspension bridge
1915 Çanakkale Bridge	2022	Turkey	2023 m	Suspension bridge
Xihoumen Railroad Bridge	2026	China	1448 m	Suspension bridge

== See also ==
- List of longest suspension bridge spans - Under construction
- Strait of Messina Bridge
