= William Brown (bridge designer) =

British bridge designer (1928–2005)

William Christopher Brown South Wales, Great Britain (16 September 1928 – London, 16 March 2005) was a British structural engineer and bridge designer who specialised in suspension bridges. He is credited with the idea of designing bridge decks with an aerofoil-shaped cross section (in effect an upside-down wing) for stability in a wide variety of wind conditions.

He was educated at Monmouth School, University College, Southampton and Imperial College London.

He was one of the principal designers at Freeman Fox & Partners (now Hyder Consulting) from 1956 to 1985. In 1987 he set up the Brown Beech & Associates.

== List of bridges ==
- 1957. Adomi Bridge on the Volta River, Ghana, length 334m/1095 ft, arch span 245m/803 ft with a suspended roadway (Consulting Engineer: Freeman Fox & Partners)
- 1959-1971. Auckland Harbour Bridge, New Zealand, length 1020m/3346 ft, main span 243m/797 ft (designed by Sir Gilbert Roberts and William Brown)
- 1964. Forth Road Bridge, Scotland, length 1824m, main span 1006m/3300 ft (designed by Mot, Hay, Anderson, Sir Gilbert Roberts and William Brown at Freeman Fox & Partners)
- 1966. Wye Bridge, link South Wales-England, length 1153m/3184 ft, main span 235m/1000 ft (Consulting Engineer: Freeman Fox)
- 1966. Severn Bridge, England, length 1839m/6033 ft, main span 988m/3240 ft (designed by Mott, Hay, Anderson, Sir Gilbert Roberts and William Brown at the Freeman Fox & Partners)
- 1971. Erskine Bridge, Scotland, length 524m/1719, main span 305m/1000 ft (designed by William Brown)
- 1973. Bosporus Bridge, Turkey, length 1560m/5118 ft, main span 1074m/3523 ft (William Brown was the partner responsible for design at Freeman Fox)
- 1975. Cleddau Bridge, Wales, length 820m (designed at Freeman Fox & Partners)
- 1978. West Gate Bridge, Australia, length 2583m, main span 336m (designed by William Brown at Freeman Fox & Partners)
- 1981. Humber Bridge, England, length 2220m/7283 ft, main span 1410m/4264 ft (designed at the Freeman Fox & Partners)
- 1988. Bosporus II Bridge, Turkey, length 1090m/3576 ft, main span 1090m/3576 ft (William Brown was the bridge designer and engineer for construction)
- 1993. Vidyasagar Setu (Hooghly II Bridge), India, length 823m/2700 ft, main span 457.5m/1500 ft (Consulting Engineer: Freeman Fox & Partners)
- 1998. Storebaelt Bridge, Denmark, length 6800m/4.2 miles, main span 1624m/5328 ft (Major development in cable spinning using William Brown's controlled tension method)
- 2001. Triangle Link, Norway, length max 1077m/3533 ft, main span 677m/2221 ft (Brown Beech carried out erection engineering for the superstructure which included further development in cable spinning)

=== Bridges proposed or not yet built ===
- 1993. (yet to be built) Strait of Messina Bridge, Italy, length 3666m/12028 ft, main span 3300m/10827 ft (William Brown and "Brown Beech & Associates" were engaged by Stretto di Messina SPA to lead the innovative bridge design)
- 1995. proposed Dardanelles Bridge, Turkey, length 2150m/7053 ft, main span 1450m/4757 ft (based on the designs, specifications and calculations of William Brown and W.W.Frishmann)
- 1997. proposed Java-Bali Bridge, Indonesia, length, main span 2100m/6889 ft (designed by William Brown at Brown Beech)
- 1997. proposed Izmit Bay Bridge, Turkey, length 3.3 km/2 miles, main span 1688m/5538 ft (designed by William Brown at Brown Beech)
- 2003. (yet to be built) Tsing Lung Bridge, length, main span 1418m/4652 ft (Consulting Engineers: Brown Beech Associates)

== See also ==
- Strait of Messina Bridge
- Messina Type Deck
