= Gilbert Roberts (civil engineer) =

British civil engineer

Sir Gilbert Roberts
- Born: Gilbert Roberts; 18 February 1899
- Died: 1 January 1978 (aged 78)
- Awards: Royal Medal (1968); Fellow of the Royal Society

Sir Gilbert Roberts (18 February 1899 – 1 January 1978) was a British civil engineer who designed many famous bridges worldwide.

== Education ==
Roberts was born in Hampstead, north London, to Henry William Roberts, a pharmacist, and was educated at Bromley High School. He then went to Gresham College to study engineering but on the outbreak of WWI he joined the Royal Flying Corps.

== Career ==
After being shot in the knee in 1918 on a bombing raid, Roberts was invalided back to England and awarded an Army Scholarship to attend City and Guilds College of Imperial College, where he obtained his degree in 1923. He became a civil engineer and worked on the Sydney Harbour Bridge (1932) and Otto Beit suspension bridge (1938) across the Zambezi River.

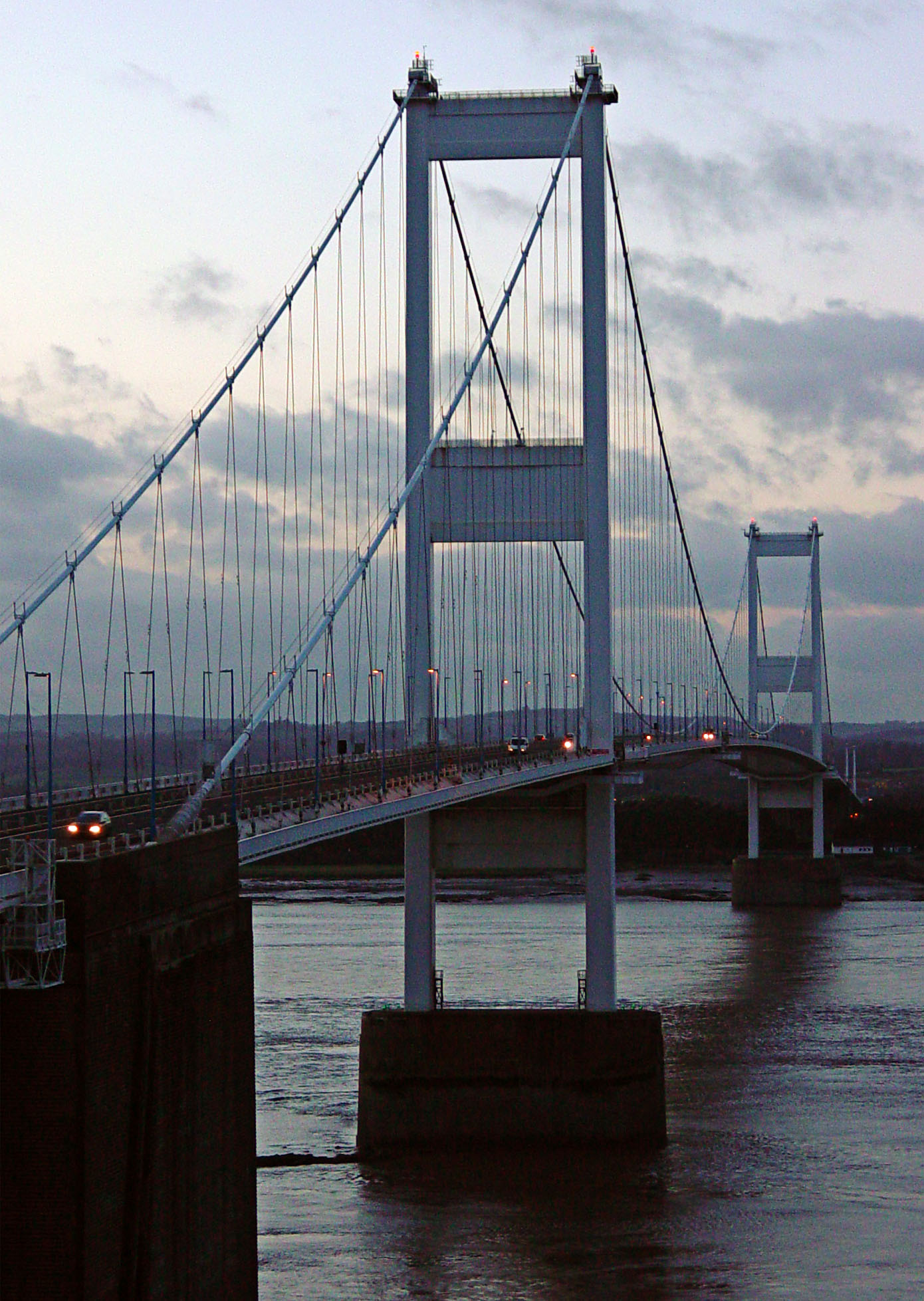
Severn Bridge

As a senior partner with the British firm Freeman Fox & Partners he designed, in collaboration with William Brown, the Volta River Bridge (1957), the Auckland Harbour Bridge (1959–71), the Forth Road Bridge (1964), the Severn Bridge (1966), the Bosphorus Bridge (1973) and the Humber Bridge (1981). Roberts was also the designer of the ill-fated West Gate Bridge in Melbourne which collapsed on October 15, 1970, killing 35 workers and injuring 18 others.

== Awards ==
Roberts was knighted in 1965. He was elected a Fellow of the Royal Society on 18 March 1965. His application citation read: "Distinguished for his contributions to civil engineering by advancing the design of structures, particularly long span bridges. Designer of Severn Bridge, Forth Bridge, Volta Bridge, Maidenhead Bridge, Auckland Harbour Bridge. Also contributed designs of other unusual structures, such as C.S.I.R.O. Radio Telescope, High Marnham Power Station, the Dome of Discovery at the Festival of Britain Exhibition, crane structures including 500 tons goliath crane for Babcock & Wilcox." He was awarded their Royal Medal in 1968.

== Personal life ==
Roberts married Elizabeth Nada Hora in London in 1935. He died in St. Stephen's Hospital, London on 1 January 1978.
