= Gheshlagh Bridge =

Historic bridge in Kurdistan province, Iran

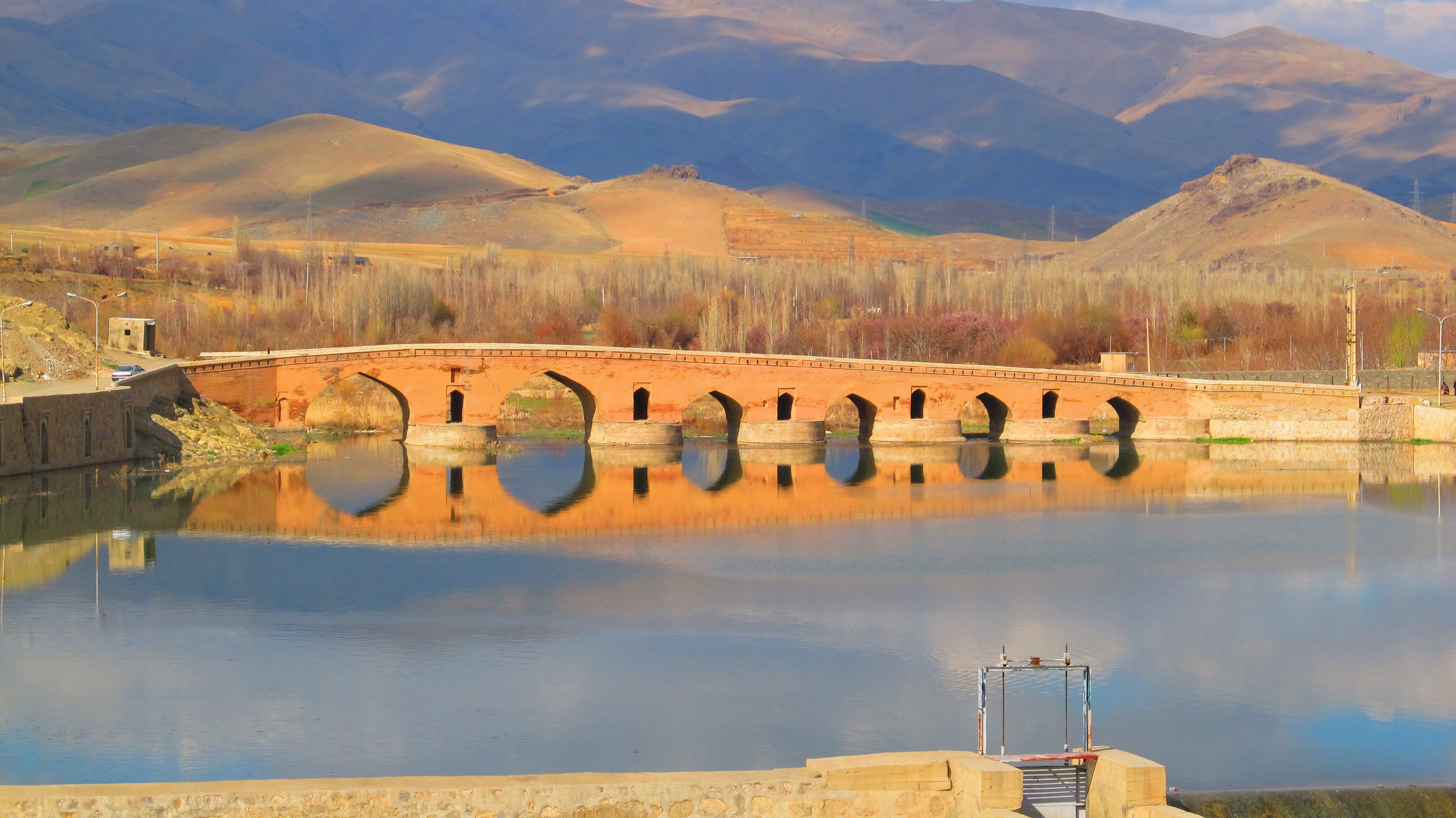
Qeshlaq Bridge

Gheshlagh Bridge (Persian: پل قشلاق) is located east of Sanandaj, the center of Iran's Kurdistan province.

This bridge on Gheshlagh river is a remnant of the Safavid and Zand eras. It was renovated later, especially in the Qajar era. The bridge was constructed by the order of Shah Safi, on the route from Sanandaj to Hamadan. Two centuries later, when the bridge was almost ruined, it was renovated again. A stone inscription on the facing mountain reads the name of Gholam Hossein Khan who repaired the bridge.

== The bridge's architecture ==
The bridge is built on a straight line, its length is about 78 meters, width of 3 meters and has six openings. This bridge is an example of the high technique of bridge building in the Safavid era. The six openings have zigzag shape ceilings. Width of openings increase from east to west, it starts from 2.20 m and reaches to 4.20m. The height of the bridge from the river bed, at its highest point, reaches to about 4.6m. The height of ceiling columns from the river bed varies from 1.5m to 2.5m. On the top of the bridge there is a half a meter turret on each side of the passageway. The triangular bases are to divide the stream of water. Gulches on the height of 1.2m and width of 0.8m are made on the base. The passage over the bridge is paved. The bridge's rock bases have come out 1 m above the pavement. The main body of the bridge is constructed of bricks.
