= COWI =

Danish consulting group

COWI A/S

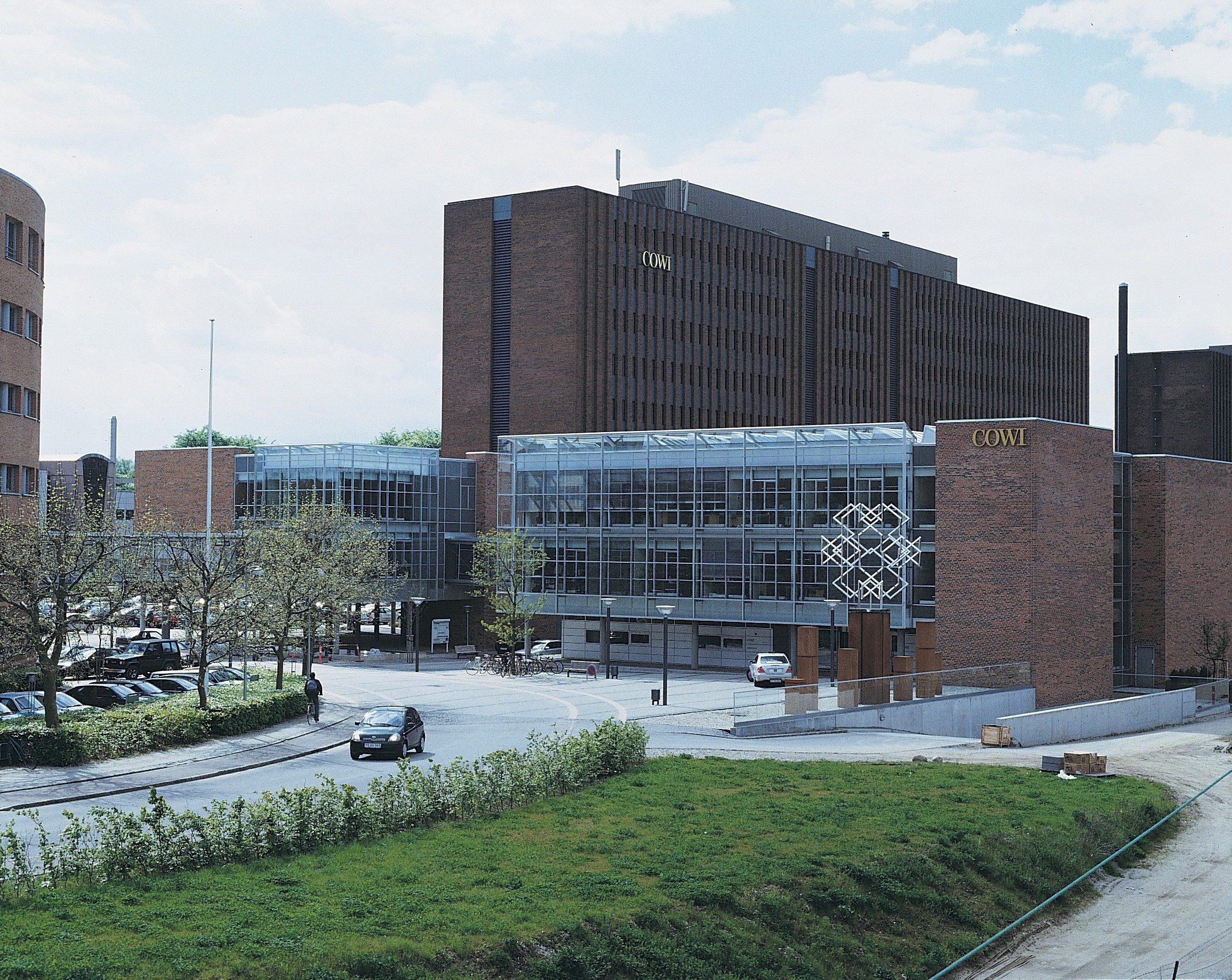
- COWI headquarters
- Type: Private
- Industry: Consulting
- Founded: 1930
- Founder: Christen Ostenfeld
- Headquarters: Kongens Lyngby, Denmark
- Key people: Jens Højgaard Christoffersen (CEO)
- Services: Engineering, environmental science and economics
- Revenue: € 985 million (2022)
- Operating income: € 33 million (2022)
- Net income: € 22 million (2022)
- Total assets: € 498 million (2022)
- Total equity: € 203 million (2022)
- Owner: COWIfonden (the COWIfoundation) (85%) Present and Former Employees (15%)
- Number of employees: 7,156 (2022)
- Website: www.cowi.com

COWI A/S is an international consulting group, specializing in engineering, environmental science and economics, with headquarters located in Lyngby, Denmark.

It has been involved in more than 50,000 projects in 175 countries and as at September 2016, has approximately 7,300 employees, including engineers, biologists, geologists, economists, surveyors, anthropologists, sociologists and architects.

== History ==
COWI was founded in 1930 by civil engineer Christen Ostenfeld in Copenhagen. Prior to establishing the business, Ostenfeld had spent several years in both France and Switzerland, during which time he developed an international outlook, independence and close cooperation with the research community that helped shape the future business. During 1931, Ostenfeld was hired to reconstruct Copenhagen's run-down Scala Theatre; having only a short timeframe to conduct the work, he opted to use prefabricated steel elements that did not need any scaffolding to speed up construction. The company's first international project was undertaken in 1935 with the design of the Danish pavilion for the Brussels International Exposition of 1935, which made extensive use of prefabricated locally harvested pine wood.

Throughout the 1930s, the firm specialised in construction projects with prefabricated elements and long-span roofs. It was also involved in the design of various bridges; the company's first major undertaking in this sector was the Aggersund bridge. Built for the Danish state under a private tender and opened in 1942, the bridge's design was influenced by modern techniques acquired in Czechoslovakia. Other innovative techniques and technologies were acquired throughout the 1940s, one such innovation being prestressed concrete; the original techniques, acquired from France, were further improved by the company and adapted to suit the colder Danish climate. Countless future undertakings by the firm made use of prestressed concrete construction, such as the world's first prestressed concrete silo (1956). Another innovation, created by Ostenfeld and Lauritz Bjerrum, was a telescopic drill that measured ground pressure to work out the bearing capacity of deep soil layers.

The business was heavily impacted by the Invasion of Denmark by Nazi Germany. The company's resources were rationed as the Danish government placed all design work on hold, placing the company's future at jeopardy. Ostenfeld personally travelled across the nation, lobbying for the most important projects to be kept going. Government subsidies were granted for the design of various civil engineering projects in preparation for the postwar years, which permitted the business to continue its engineering activities as well to get a valuable lead on planning work. As soon as the conflict ended, various construction projects were quickly launched and contact was re-established with the company's international colleagues as it became safe to freely communicate and travel once again.

During 1946, Wriborg W. Jønson became an equal partner in the business. The initials of the two senior partners lent the company its name; between 1946 and 1973, the company operated as a partnership under the name of Chr. Ostenfeld & W. Jønson (often shortened to O&J. During the 1950s, the company began to expand internationally; by 1953, a quarter of all turnover was being generated outside Denmark. Its first international office was established in Paris in response to the large and lucrative market opportunities for silos in France. During 1957, O&J designed the Fredrikstad Bridge in Norway, which was the company's first large bridge outside Denmark.

An increasing variety of projects were undertaken by the company throughout the 1960s following a considerable uptick in orders. In addition to regular silo work, it was involved in the building of Tamale Airport in Ghana, the Danish Embassy in Paris, a nuclear research facility in Geneva, the Little Belt Bridge in Denmark, renovated government facilities in Bahrain, numerous dams and bridges across the Middle East, and residential housing on permafrost in Greenland. One scheme, a motorway project between Baghdad and the Turkish border, had to be abandoned following the outbreak of the Iran-Iraq War. By the end of the decade, the firm had no less than 400 employees, a quarter of which were based outside Denmark.

During 1972, Ostenfeld retired from the firm; in the following year, the company's ownership was transferred to a foundation chaired by Wriborg Jønson and a new name was adopted "COWIconsult, Rådgivende Ingeniører A/S", ("COWIconsult, Consulting Engineers and Planners A/S") that was based on the two senior partners’ initials. Across the 1970s, in response to the energy crises of this decade, the company broadened its horizon from specialising primarily in bridges and structural engineering to building in the fields of energy and environment, such as combined heat and power. Among other environmental issues, it moved into with water treatment, waste management and air pollution, gradually becoming an established environmental consultant, working with local authorities, utility companies, and businesses alike in this capacity. In collaboration with the World Bank and the United Nations Development Programme, it has worked on numerous projects in developing countries such as Nigeria, Kenya and Swaziland. By 1979, COWIconsult has more than 800 staff, and a third of its turnover is generated outside of Denmark.

In 1995, the company was renamed once again to the current COWI. By this point, it had developed into a full-service consultant in social analysis, urban development, transport and welfare.

During the new millennium, a number of strategic acquisitions were made in Scandinavia and the UK, significantly increasing the number of employees and undertakings of the business. In 2008, the firm bought Flint & Neill, a UK civil and structural engineering consultancy specialising in bridges. In November 2014, the firm acquired Donaldson Associates Ltd, a UK base tunneling specialist company; at the time of acquisition, Donaldson Associates Ltd had 150 staff, operating from five UK offices and one international office in Hong Kong. In November 2018, the firm acquired the Danish architecture firm Arkitema Architects; it was the largest acquisition by COWI at that time.

In early 2022, COWI acquired US-based Finley Engineering Group. That same year, COWI announced that the company will no longer participate in tenders for new fossil energy projects.

== Ownership ==
COWI Holding A/S is an unlisted Danish public limited liability company jointly owned by the COWIfonden (the COWIfoundation) holding 85% of shares with the remaining 15% of company shares held by current and former employees from eight countries where COWI operates. The company regards employee shareholders as co-owners. The current company structure was adapted in 2010.

== Sustainability ==
With the rise of awareness about the climate crisis, COWI prioritised the need for action through overall organisational change. In 2022, COWI developed and adopted a new vision and strategy called FUTURE-NOW that puts sustainability at the centre of the company. The strategy works to accelerate the green transition and means that COWI became the first among engineering consultancies to stop taking on fossil fuel projects. Instead, COWI now allocates all resources to projects that move its customers towards sustainability. The goal is that 100 per cent of COWI's revenue must come from projects driving sustainability. COWI has established sustainability targets.

== See also ==
- Øresund Bridge
- Copenhagen Metro
- Great Belt Fixed Link
- Strait of Messina Bridge
- Çanakkale 1915 Bridge
