= Anas (company) =

Italian joint-stock company

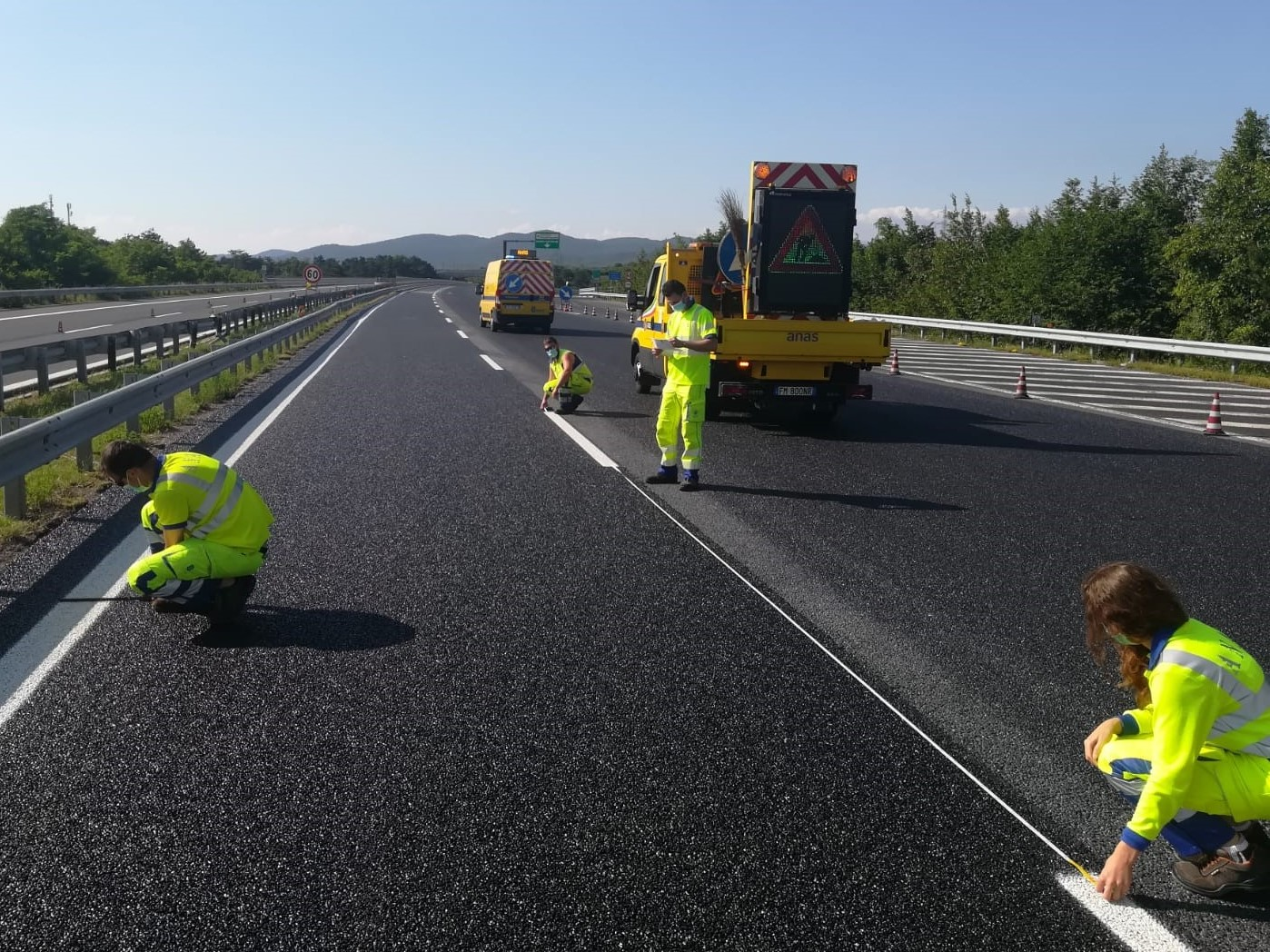
- Anas personnel engaged in inspections of pavements and road markings along the A4 - Trieste motorway junction 13
- Company type: S.p.A.
- Industry: Road transport
- Founded: 1946
- Founder: Italian Government
- Headquarters: Rome, Italy
- Key people: Edoardo Valente, Chairman; Aldo Isi, CEO
- Products: Motorways construction and maintenance
- Revenue: € 2.889 billion (2021)
- Operating income: € -6.61 million (2021)
- Net income: € 0.4 million (2021)
- Total equity: € 2.441 billion (2021)
- Owner: Ferrovie dello Stato Italiane
- Number of employees: 6,951 (2021)
- Website: https://www.stradeanas.it/it/
- Footnotes / references source

Anas S.p.A. is an Italian joint-stock company that deals with road infrastructure and manages the network of state roads and motorways of national interest. Founded in 1946 with the name Azienda Nazionale Autonoma delle Strade (ANAS), this acronym became a proper name with the transformation first into a public economic body (1996) and subsequently into a joint-stock company (2002). Since January 2018, it has been part of the Ferrovie dello Stato Italiane corporate group. Legally, the company can be classified as a public law body; furthermore, within the European System of Accounts, it appears among the companies in the consolidated income statement of the Italian state.

== History ==
In Italian history there was attempts to delineate a network of National roads; the Law 1094 of the 17th May 1928 (Decreto del 17 maggio 1928) established the "Azienda Autonoma Statale delle Strade" (AASS) (Autonomous State Agency of the Roads) with the first 137 National Roads. In the years the Agency grow up and after the Ethiopic War it managed about 5000 km of roads. This Agency was merged into Ministry of public works.

Founded on 27 June 1946, the company took a government grant for the reconstruction of the Italian road network, which had been seriously damaged in World War II.

== Managed road network ==
Anas holds the concession to manage the national road network, as governed by Decreto Legislativo no. 461 of 29 October 1999 as amended by the D.P.C.M. of 21 September 2001 ("Modifications to the Prime Ministerial Decree of 21 February 2000 identifying and transferring, pursuant to Article 101, paragraph 1, of Legislative Decree no. 112 of 1998, roads not included in the national motorway and road network") and other subsequent measures. The company manages and controls a network of 31,910 km of state roads, motorways, and spour route under direct management, including motorway interchanges and slip roads. The road network expanded between 2018 and 2021 as a result of the 'Rientro Strade' plan, which brought 6,500 km of former highway, regional and county road back under Anas management. The plan was launched in August 2017 with the agreement sanctioned by the Conferenza Unificata, which was followed by the Prime Ministerial Decree of 20 February 2018, while the second phase of the plan started in April 2021 in execution of the D.P.C.M. of 21 November 2019. Anas's roads are divided into regional compartments of competence, of which the Sicilian one has the most extensive road network with over 3,914 km.

== Shareholdings ==
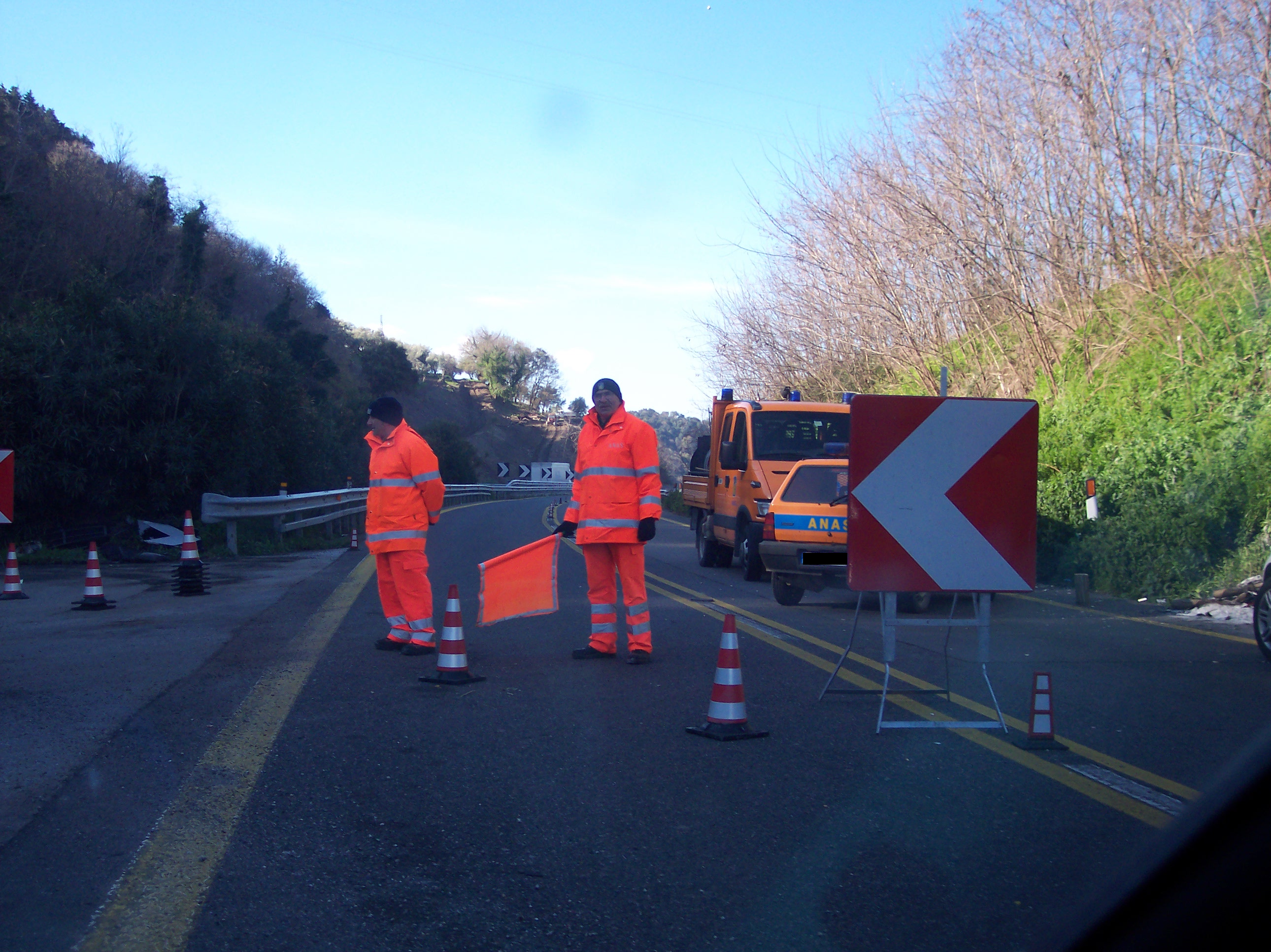
Anas workers in charge of alternating one-way traffic on the A2 Salerno-Reggio Calabria motorway

Anas has shareholdings in:

=== Directly controlled companies ===
- Anas International Enterprise - 100%
- Anas Concessioni Autostradali - 100%
- Quadrilatero Marche Umbria - 92.38%
- Stretto di Messina S.p.A. (company in liquidation) - 81.85%

=== Indirectly controlled companies ===
- PMC Mediterraneum - 1.50%

=== Associated companies ===
- Autostrade del Lazio - 50.00%
- Concessioni Autostradali Lombarde - 50.00%
- Concessioni Autostradali Venete - 50.00%
- Autostrada Asti-Cuneo - 35.00%
- Società Italiana per il Traforo del Monte Bianco - 32.13%
- Società Italiana per il Traforo Autostradale del Frejus (Sitaf S.p.A.) - 31.75%

=== Other companies ===
- Italian Distribution Council (company in liquidation) - 6.67%
- Consel (Consorzio ELIS per la formazione professionale superiore) - 1.00%

== Commercial data ==
in € millions	Year 2021	Year 2020	Year 2019	Year 2018
Revenue	2,889.35	2,343.08	2,163.47	2,046.51
Operating Income (EBIT)	-6.61	-19.63	-25.26	-11.64
Net Income	0.40	-168.76	-71.14	2.04
Net debt	-869.49	-1,061.27	-1,550.20	-1,457.65
Total equity	2,441.47	2,441.66	2,611.21	2,685.38
