= Santa Palomba transmitter =

Santa Palomba transmitter is a facility of RAI (the Italian broadcaster), used for medium-wave broadcasting near Santa Palomba at 41°42′13″N 12°34′50″E. It works on 846 kHz and 1332 kHz. On the first frequency, it can be easily received throughout Europe at night time.

Santa Palomba transmitter uses three antennas: two free-standing lattice towers, 186 metres and 75 metres tall and an array of three 116-meter-tall guyed mast radiators. The 186-meter-tall main tower, which is a grounded structure equipped with two individually feedable cage antenna systems for effective skywave suppression, is used for broadcasting on 846 kHz, and the mast array is used for broadcasting on 1332 kHz. The 75-meter-tall lattice tower, which is also grounded and equipped with a cage antenna, serves as a backup antenna for both frequencies.

Santa Palomba transmitter, which belongs to the most important transmitters of RAI, got controversial after the power of the transmitter for 846 kHz was increased to 1500 kW.
