= Stretto di Messina =

Company established in 1981 to design, build, and manage the Strait of Messina Bridge

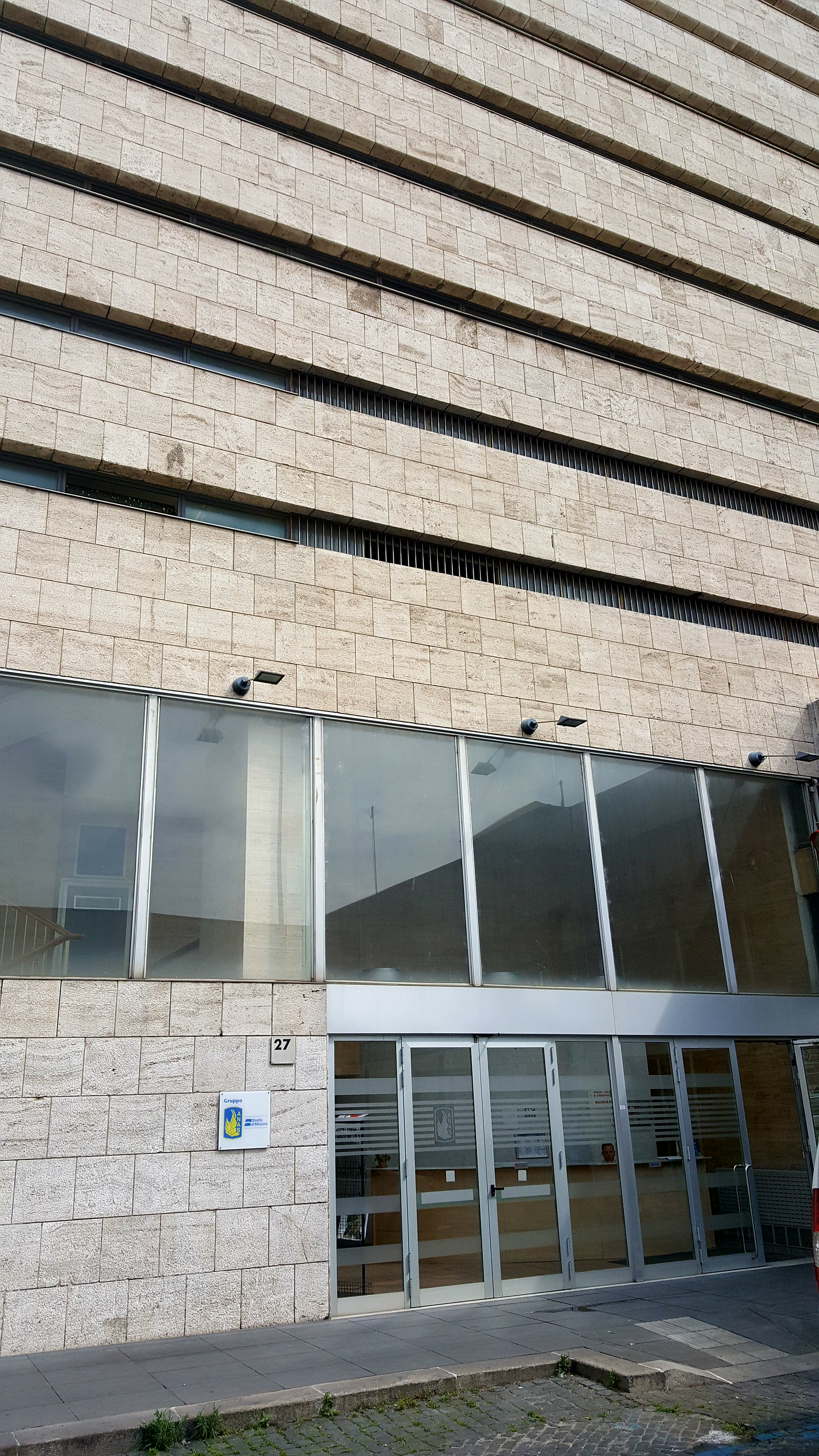
- Company headquarters
- Native name: Stretto di Messina S.p.A.
- Type: Società per azioni
- Industry: Construction industry
- Founded: 11 June 1981; 45 years ago
- Founder: MEF; RFI; ANAS; Regione Siciliana; Regione Calabria
- Headquarters: Rome, Italy
- Area served: Italy
- Products: Strait of Messina Bridge
- Owner: MEF (55.16%); ANAS (36.70%); Rete Ferroviaria Italiana (5.83%); Regione Siciliana (1.16%); Regione Calabria (1.16%)
- Parent: MEF
- Website: www.strettodimessina.it

The Stretto di Messina S.p.A. company was established in 1981 in implementation of law no. 1158/1971 of the Italian government to design, build and manage the Strait of Messina Bridge.

== History ==
The Stretto di Messina S.p.A. it was put into liquidation by the Monti Cabinet on 15 April 2013. With the "decreto ponte" (bridge decree, DL 35 of 31 March 2023), in view of the resumption of the Messina Bridge construction process, the company's liquidation status was revoked.

== Messina Bridge technical committee ==
=== 2010 ===
On 14 July 2010, the Stretto di Messina company and the Ministry of Infrastructure set up a technical table with the role of technical consultancy for the purpose of supervising and directing the technical design activities of the Strait of Messina Bridge. The committee, which remained in office until the end of the work wanted by the Monti government in 2011, was made up as follows.

- Professor Giulio Ballio, Rector of the Politecnico di Milano (coordinator)
- Professor Claudio Borri, Director of the Interuniversity Center for Building Aerodynamics and Wind Engineering, Full professor of civil and environmental engineering at the University of Florence, with a specialization in structures and aerodynamics;
- Professor Raffaele Casciaro, Professor of Construction Science at the University of Calabria, with specialization in structures;
- Professor Alberto Castellani, Professor of Construction in seismic areas at the Milan Polytechnic, with specialization in seismic engineering;
- Professor Pietro D'Asdia, Deputy Rector of the University of Pescara, Full Professor of Structural Construction Techniques, with specialization in suspended structures and bridges;
- Professor Giuseppe Muscolino, Professor of Construction Science at the University of Messina, with specialization in structures;
- Professor Alberto Prestininzi, Professor of Earth Engineering at the University of Sapienza University of Rome, with specialization in geology;
- Professor Giuseppe Ricceri, Professor of Geotechnics at the University of Padua, with specialization in the environment and tunnels;
- Professor Giovanni Solari, Full Professor of Civil Engineering and Architecture at the University of Genoa, with specialization in structures and wind engineering.

=== 2023 ===
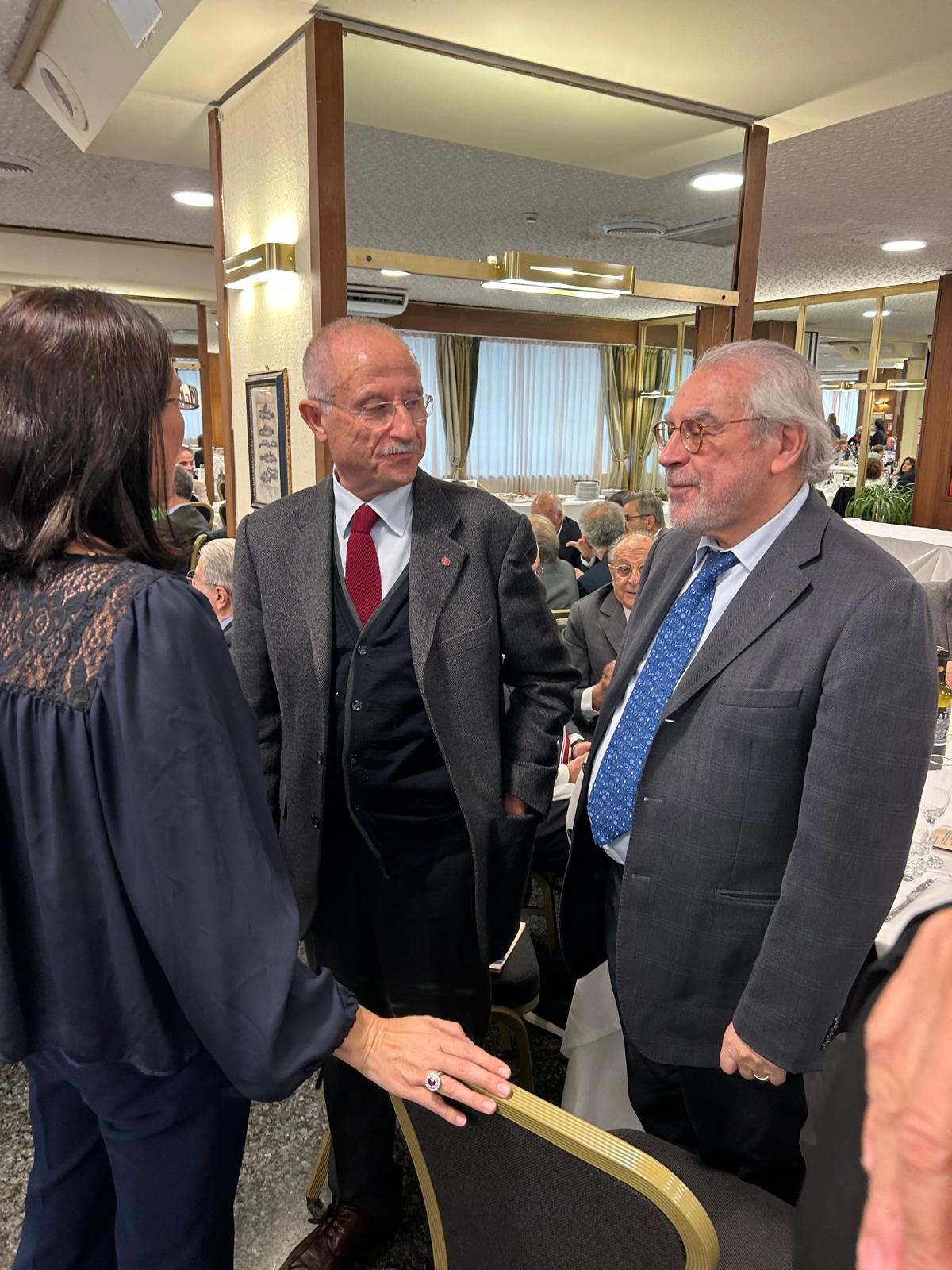
The President of the Scientific Committee Alberto Prestininzi (left) with Enzo Siviero in Messina in 2023.

On 19 September 2023, the Ministry of Infrastructure and Transport (MIT), having restarted the process for the construction of the Messina Bridge with law n.58 of 26 May 2023 signed by the President of the Italian Republic Sergio Mattarella, appointed a new scientific committee.

- Alberto Prestininzi (coordinator)
- Claudio Borri
- Andreas Taras
- Sara Muggiasca
- Mauro Dolce
- Francesco Karrer
- Giuseppe Muscolino
- Paolo Fuschi
- Alessio Ferrari

== See also ==
- Strait of Messina Bridge
- ANAS
- Salini Impregilo
