= Strait of Messina Bridge =

Proposed suspension bridge linking Sicily to mainland Italy

Strait of Messina Bridge Ponte sullo stretto di Messina
- An artist's impression of the planned bridge from the Calabrian coast
- Coordinates: 38°14′51″N 15°38′21″E
- Carries: Six lanes and two emergency lanes; two rail tracks and two railway sidewalks.
- Crosses: Strait of Messina
- Locale: Messina and Villa San Giovanni

Characteristics
- Design: Suspension bridge
- Total length: 3,666 metres (12,028 ft)
- Height: 399 metres (1,309 ft) (pylons)
- Longest span: 3,300 metres (10,800 ft)
- Clearance below: 76 metres (249 ft)

History
- Designer: Stretto di Messina
- Construction start: TBD
- Construction end: TBD

Location
- Interactive map of Strait of Messina Bridge

The Strait of Messina Bridge (Italian: Ponte sullo stretto di Messina) is a proposed 3.6-kilometre (2 1/4 mi) suspension bridge across the Strait of Messina, connecting Torre Faro on the Italian island of Sicily with Villa San Giovanni in Calabria on the Italian mainland. If built, it would be the longest suspension bridge in the world and part of the Berlin–Palermo railway axis of the Trans-European Transport Networks.

While a bridge across the Strait of Messina had been proposed since ancient times, the first detailed plan was made in the 1990s, for a suspension bridge. The project was cancelled in 2006 under Prime Minister Romano Prodi, revived in 2009 under Silvio Berlusconi, and cancelled again in 2013 under Mario Monti. It was resurrected again in 2023 under Giorgia Meloni and received final government approval in August 2025. However, in October 2025, Italy's Court of Audit rejected the proposal.

The proposal has drawn concerns connected with earthquakes, strong currents in the strait, disruption of bird migration routes, and a possibility of infiltration into the bridge's construction by the mafia groups Cosa Nostra and 'Ndrangheta.

== Geography ==
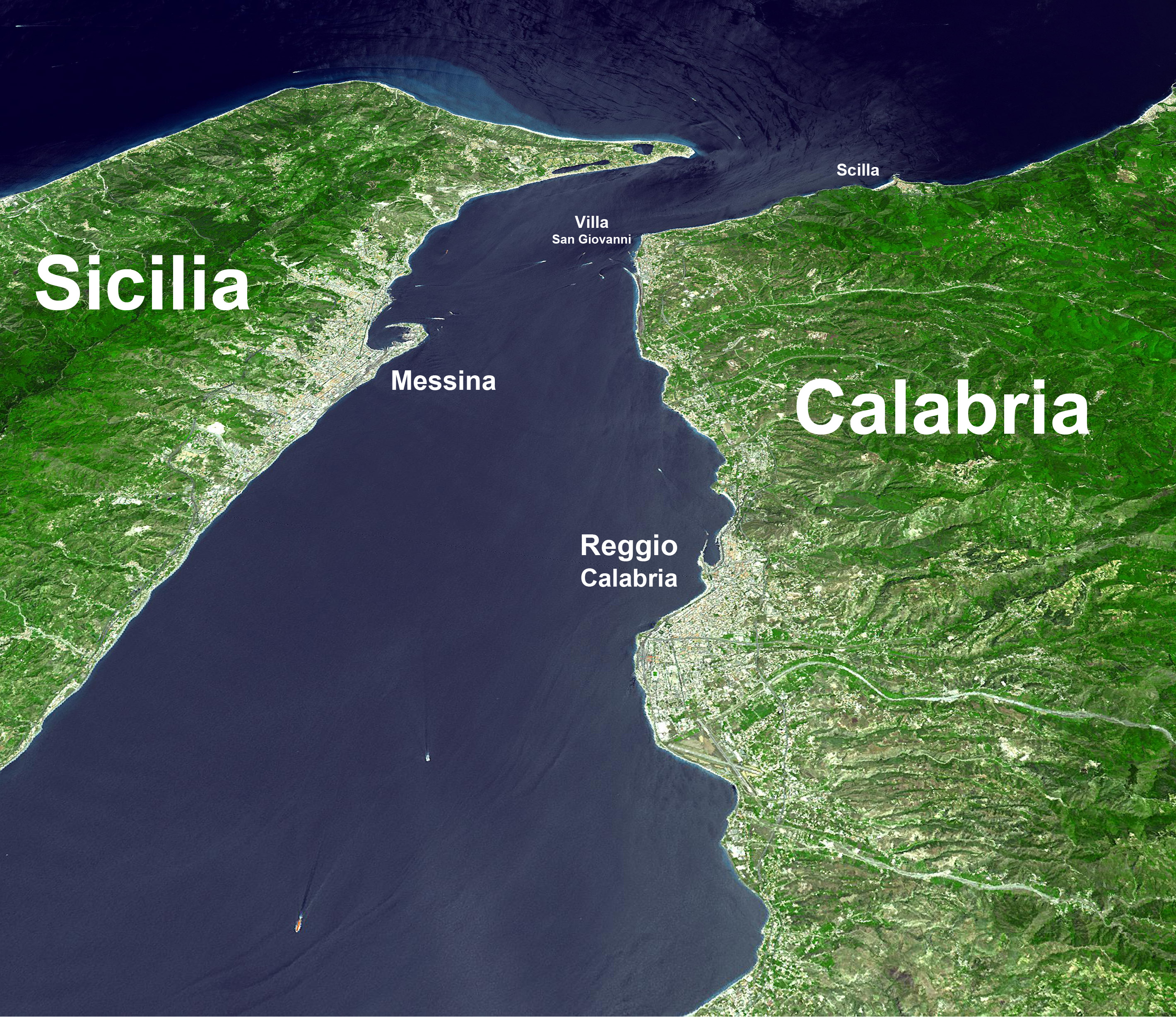
A 2002 NASA photo of the Strait of Messina. The bridge is expected to connect north Messina with Villa San Giovanni.

The Strait of Messina is a funnel-shaped arm of sea that connects the Ionian Sea in the south to the Tyrrhenian Sea to the north. The width of the strait varies from a maximum of approximately 16 km (9.9 miles), between Capo d'Alì in Sicily and Punta Pellaro in Calabria, to a minimum of approximately 3 km (1.9 miles) between Capo Peloro in Sicily and Torre Cavallo in Calabria. A similar distance separates Pezzo and Ganzirri. At that point, the strait is only 72 m (236 ft) deep, while in other places, it can reach 200 m (660 ft) deep. In addition to strong tidal currents, the region's significant seismic activity will pose a challenge to the bridge's construction.

== History ==
The idea of a bridge crossing the strait is an old one. The Romans considered building a bridge joining Calabria and Sicily, which was to be constructed from boats and barrels. Pliny the Elder, a philosopher and Roman military leader born in AD 23, wrote of a plan to bridge the strait with a series of connecting boats. The idea was abandoned, as it was clear that more traffic plied the strait in a north-south rather than east-west direction, so any structure on water could not be permanent.

Charlemagne considered joining the two sides with a series of bridges. This idea was revived by the Norman adventurer Robert Guiscard in the 11th century and by Roger II of Sicily in the 12th. In 1876, the politician Giuseppe Zanardelli was convinced that the strait could be linked by either a bridge or a tunnel. In 1866, the public works minister, Stefano Jacini, turned to Alfredo Cottrau, an internationally renowned engineer, to design a planned bridge between Calabria and Sicily.

In 1870, Navone proposed building a tunnel, based on Napoleon's failed 1802 proposal of a Channel Tunnel running below the English Channel. It was to start at Contesse and pass below Messina and Ganzirri at a depth of 150 m (490 ft), crossing the strait to Punta Pezzo and resurfacing at Torre Cavallo.

In 1909, a geological study of the strait was published (historical Arch. Sicilian year XXXIV f.1,2). In 1921, a study of an undersea tunnel was released to the Geographic Conference of Florence. A group of railway civil engineers studied the possibility of a suspension bridge, but nothing came of it.

In 1953, the idea was revived by the American civil engineer David B. Steinman, with a plan to build a bridge that crossed the strait using two 220 m (720 ft) towers sunk 120 m (390 ft) into the seafloor. The proposed 1,524 m (5,000 ft) span would have represented a world record, eclipsing the then-longest 1,275 m (4,183 ft) centre span of the Golden Gate Bridge and longer than the 2,256 m (7,402 ft) Mackinac Bridge, then in planning, with a total length of 2,988 m (9,803 ft). The proposed structure was to clear the sea by 50 m (160 ft) for navigation and have two decks—a lower deck carrying two rail lines, and 7 m (23 ft) above, a road deck 30 m (98 ft) wide. The main cables were designed with a diameter of 1 m (39 in). Construction of the bridge would have required 12,000 workers and cost hundreds of billions of lire.

== Modern attempts to build the bridge ==
=== Early planning stages ===
==== Oudry's bridge proposal (1852) ====
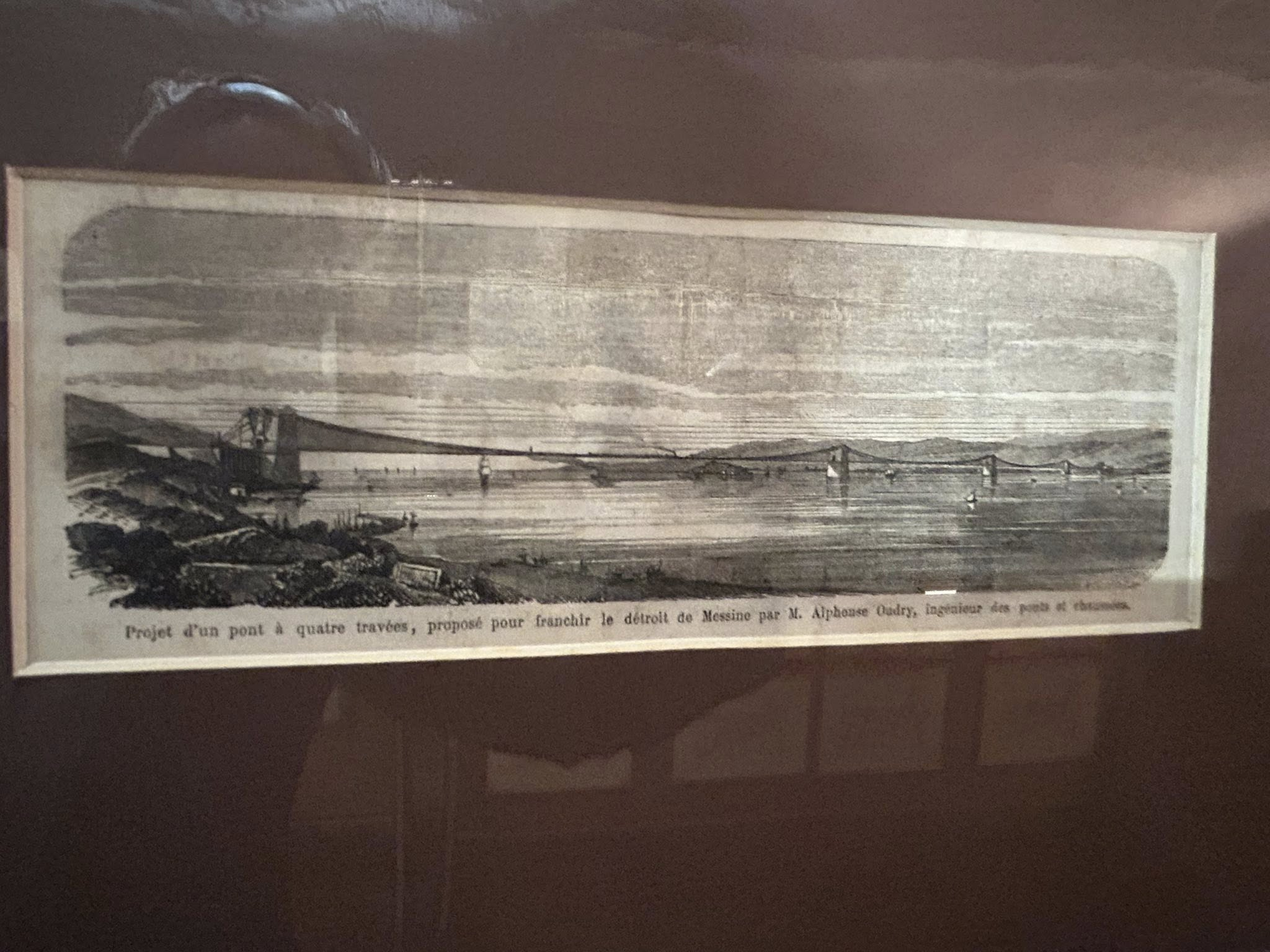
Project for a rigid and oscillation-free bridge for ordinary traffic and high-speed railway trains to be built over the Strait of Messina: proposed by Alphonse Oudry, engineer in the Imperial Corps of Bridges and Roads of France.

One of the earliest documented proposals for a permanent crossing of the Strait of Messina was developed in 1852 by the French engineer Alphonse Oudry, a member of the Corps impérial des ponts et chaussées of France. His concept envisioned a four-span bridge linking Sicily to mainland Italy, representing one of the first international engineering studies dedicated to a fixed connection across the strait.

The proposal was described in French technical documentation as Projet d'un pont à quatre travées, proposé pour franchir le détroit de Messine and reflected the growing 19th-century interest in large-scale transport infrastructure and railway expansion. Oudry's design aimed to provide both road and rail connectivity between the island and the Italian mainland.

In 1862, Oudry expanded the concept with a revised study entitled Projet d'un pont indéformable et sans oscillations pour circulation ordinaire et trains de chemin de fer passant à toute vitesse à établir sur le détroit de Messine. The project emphasized structural rigidity and reduced oscillation, proposing a bridge capable of supporting conventional traffic as well as railway trains operating at high speed.

Oudry's studies are considered among the earliest modern engineering attempts to demonstrate the technical feasibility of a stable crossing over the Strait of Messina, anticipating later proposals developed throughout the late 19th and 20th centuries.

==== Others ====
- In the 1960s, a wide variety of proposals were advanced, including everything from submerged tubes to floating struts, pontoons, and a revolving central section of the bridge. None turned out to be realistic.
- In 1968, an international design competition was arranged.
- In the 1970s, feasibility studies were undertaken by the state railways, leading to the creation of a private company with responsibility for planning the strait's crossing.
- In the 1980s, the Messina Strait Company was set up with support from the state railways, the regions, and the Istituto per la Ricostruzione Industriale. It concluded that it would be feasible to build a suspension bridge.
- Detailed plans followed in the 1990s, with final approval from the High Council of Public Works (Consiglio Superiore dei Lavori Pubblici) on 10 October 1997.

=== First Berlusconi government ===
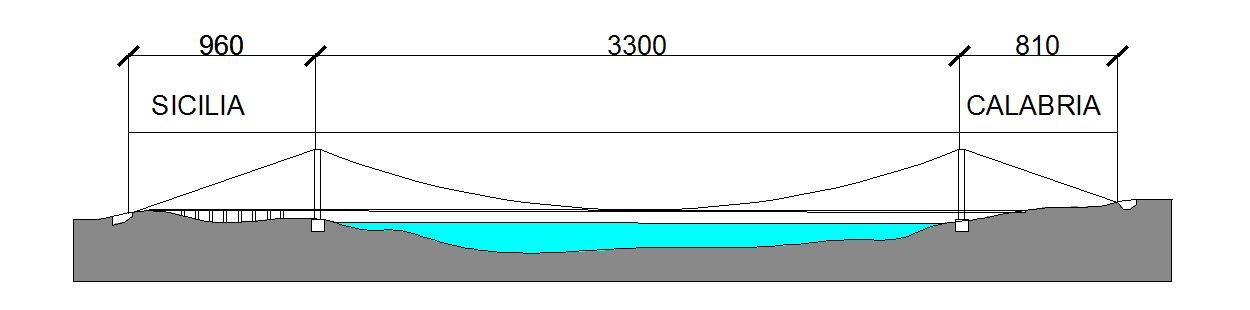
Cross-sectional diagram of the proposed Strait of Messina Bridge. The numbers represent distances in metres.

The 2006 plan called for a single-span suspension bridge with a central span of 3,300 m (10,800 ft). This would have made the span more than 60% longer than the 1915 Çanakkale Bridge in Turkey—currently the longest suspension bridge in the world, at 2,023 m (6,637 ft).

Plans called for four traffic lanes (two driving lanes and one emergency lane in each direction), two railway tracks, and two pedestrian lanes. In order to provide a minimum vertical clearance for navigation of 65 m (213 ft), the two towers were to be 382.6 m (1,255 ft) high. This would have been taller than the Millau Viaduct in France (then the world's tallest bridge, at 341 m (1,119 ft)). The bridge's suspension system would have relied on two pairs of steel cables, each with a diameter of 1.24 m (49 in) and a total length, between the anchor blocks, of 5,300 m (17,400 ft).

The design included 20.3 km (12.6 miles) of road links and 19.8 km (12.3 miles) of railway links to the bridge. On the mainland, the bridge was to connect to the new stretch of the Salerno-Reggio Calabria motorway (A3) and to the planned Naples-Reggio Calabria high-speed rail line; on the Sicilian side, to the Messina-Catania (A18) and Messina-Palermo (A20) motorways as well as the new Messina railway station (to be built by Rete Ferroviaria Italiana).

The bridge was planned to connect Reggio Calabria to Messina, the two cities that face each other on either side of the strait, in order to form a single metropolitan area. This ambitious urban project was called Area Metropolitana integrata dello Stretto ("integrated metropolitan area of the strait") or simply Città dello Stretto ("city of the strait"). Among the controversies surrounding the bridge's construction was strong, relentless opposition from various Sicilian nationalist groups, which explicitly objected to the formation of such a metropolitan area.

Among the engineers who participated in the project was Giorgio Diana, who mainly dealt with the aeroelastic aspect.

==== Contracting parties ====
A construction consortium, led by Impregilo, was selected in 2005, with work set to begin in the second half of 2006. The bridge was designed by Danish architects at Dissing+Weitling in close collaboration with the Danish engineering firm COWI. In March 2006, Impregilo and Stretto di Messina signed a contract assigning final project planning to a general contractor. Impregilo S.p.A., the lead partner, had a 45% share. Other participants were Spain's Sacyr (18.70%), the Italian companies Società Italiana per Condotte D'Acqua S.p.A. (15%) and Cooperativa Muratori & Cementisti-C.M.C. of Ravenna (13%), Japan's IHI Corporation (6.30%), and Consorzio Stabile A.C.I. S.c.p.a (2%).

The general contractor would also be assisted by the Danish and Canadian companies COWI A/S, Sund & Baelt A/S, and Buckland & Taylor Ltd., who would handle project engineering. Completion was planned to take six years, at an estimated cost of €3.9 billion.

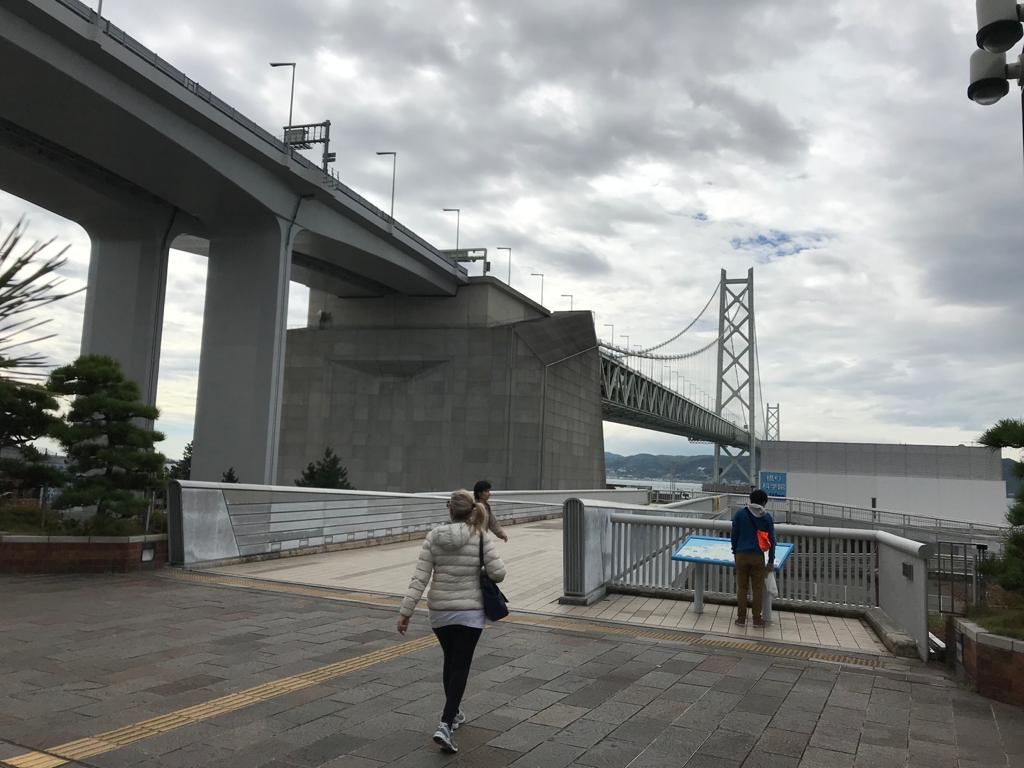
The Akashi Kaikyo Bridge, built in 1998 in Japan by IHI Corporation, one of the companies in charge of constructing the Messina Bridge.

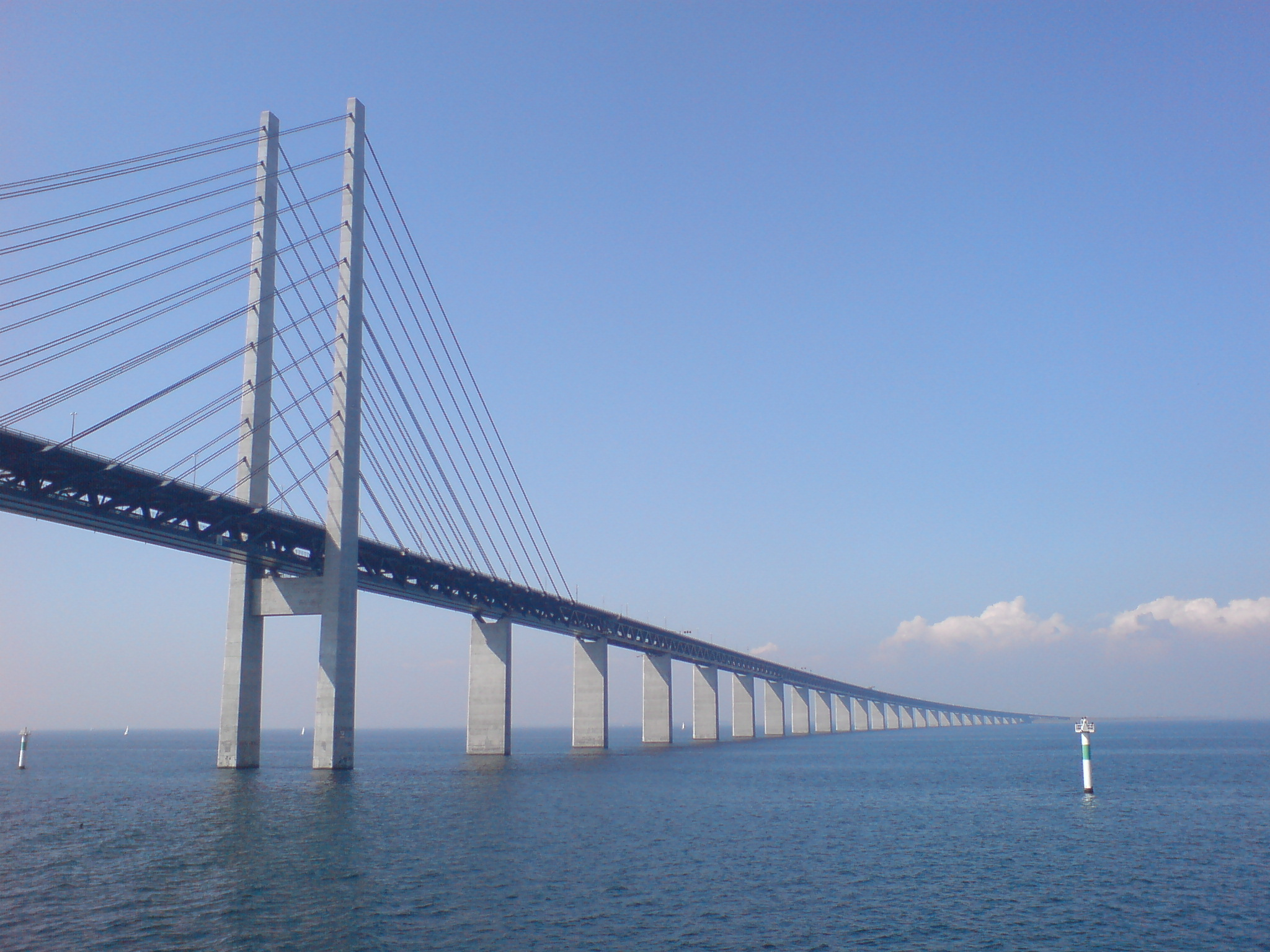
The Øresund Bridge, built in 1999 by COWI A/S, one of the companies that was supposed to be involved in constructing the Messina Bridge.

Contract of the Messina Bridge
Function	Companies	Role
General contractor (Italy) Eurolink	(Italy) Webuild (Impregilo until 2012)	Group leader (45%)
General contractor (Italy) Eurolink	(Japan) IHI Infrastructure Systems Co., Ltd.	Mandator
General contractor (Italy) Eurolink	(Denmark) COWI A/S	Mandator
General contractor (Italy) Eurolink	(Spain) Sacyr	Mandator
General contractor (Italy) Eurolink	(Italy) Società Italiana per Condotte d'Acqua	Mandator
General contractor (Italy) Eurolink	(Italy) Cooperativa Muratori & Cementisti	Mandator
General contractor (Italy) Eurolink	(Italy) Argo Costruzioni Infrastrutture	Mandator
General contractor (Italy) Eurolink	(Denmark) Dissing+Weitling	Mandator
General contractor (Italy) Eurolink	(Denmark) Sund & Bælt A/S	Mandator
General contractor (Italy) Eurolink	(Canada) Buckland & Taylor	Mandator
Project management	(United States) Parsons Corporation	
Environmental monitoring	(Italy) Fenice	Group leader
Environmental monitoring	(Italy) Agriconsulting	Mandator
Environmental monitoring	(Italy) Eurisko NOP World	Mandator
Environmental monitoring	(Italy) Nautilus Società Cooperativa	Mandator
Environmental monitoring	(Italy) Theolab	Mandator
Insurance broker	(United States) Marsh	

On 12 October 2006, the Italian Parliament voted 272 to 232 in favour of abandoning the plan due to the bridge's "doubtful usefulness and viability" and the inability of the already burdened Italian treasury to bear its share of the cost. Transport minister Alessandro Bianchi stressed that the road and rail links leading to the location of the proposed bridge were not capable of supporting enough traffic to make its construction economically feasible. Other reasons for abandoning the plan were earthquake risk and fears that the bridge would enrich the networks of organized crime in Italy, such as Cosa Nostra and 'Ndrangheta.

=== Second Berlusconi government ===
In April 2008, Silvio Berlusconi was re-elected Prime Minister of Italy and vowed to restart the project to build the bridge. The following month, Altero Matteoli, Italy's minister of infrastructure and transport, confirmed the government's intent to restart work on the bridge in a letter to Pietro Ciucci, the president of Società Stretto di Messina.

In March 2009, as part of a massive new public works programme, Berlusconi's government announced that plans to construct the Messina bridge had been revived, pledging €1.3 billion as a contribution to its estimated cost of €6.1 billion. Berlusconi claimed that work would be completed by 2016. Until 2006, when the project was halted, the work had been assigned to a consortium of Impregilo (now called Webuild), Condotte d'Acqua, Cooperativa Muratori & Cementisti, and Consorzio Stabile A.C.I., alongside Spain's Sacyr and Japan's IHI Corporation.

In December 2009, preparatory work began, with the diversion of the Tyrrhenian railway at Cannitello on the Italian mainland side of the strait.

In February 2013, the project was shut down by Prime Minister Mario Monti for lack of funds.

=== Renzi government ===
In September 2016, the project was reconsidered by the government of Matteo Renzi.

=== Conte government ===
In June 2020, during the COVID-19 pandemic, Prime Minister Giuseppe Conte brought up the topic of the bridge, declaring that the government would evaluate the resumption of work without prejudice.

In April 2021, the CEO of Webuild, Pietro Salini, in a joint press conference with the President of the Sicilian Region, Nello Musumeci, announced that he was ready to build the Strait of Messina Bridge, starting immediately with the work and on the basis of the executive project and construction site approved definitively in 2013. He declared that he already had the four-billion-euro coverage necessary for the construction and that he could obtain the other two necessary for the infrastructures connected to it from private financing.

=== Meloni government ===
On 16 March 2023, the Italian government under Prime Minister Giorgia Meloni, with Matteo Salvini as Minister of Infrastructure and Transport, approved a decree to proceed with the construction of the bridge by remodeling the existing project.

On 19 March, WeBuild's Pietro Salini said work on the bridge should begin by 2024, with the project scheduled for completion in 2032.

On 31 March, the Italian president, Sergio Mattarella, approved the Decreto Ponte ("bridge decree").

In April 2025, Salvini announced that construction of the bridge would start in mid-2025 and would comply with all environmental standards.

In August 2025, the Meloni government gave final approval to the project, allowing construction on the bridge to commence. It indicated that it would consider the bridge as a defence-related expense to count towards a NATO spending target. In September, the United States government said it disapproved of the strategy, calling it "creative accounting". On 30 October, Italy's Court of Audit rejected the proposal to build the bridge.

In February 2026, Infrastructure Minister Matteo Salvini said a government decree would keep the project's cost set at €13.5 billion, and he reiterated that work should begin in 2026, without committing to further deadlines.

== Imminent start of construction work ==
According to several institutional and economic sources, the Strait of Messina Bridge project had reached an advanced stage by early 2026, in preparation for the start of construction. This development followed a roadmap publicly presented by Pietro Ciucci, chief executive officer of Stretto di Messina, during a press interview on 21 February 2024.

A first formal milestone was reached with the approval of Resolution No. 41 by CIPESS on 6 August 2025. However, on 29 October 2025, the Court of Audit declined to validate the resolution, preventing it from entering into force. Without this approval, publication in the Gazzetta Ufficiale could not produce legal effects, delaying what might otherwise have been a construction start as early as November 2025.

Throughout 2026, the competent authorities—including the Ministry of Infrastructure and Transport, Stretto di Messina S.p.A., and the Webuild group—worked to address the observations raised by the Court of Audit.

These observations primarily concerned four issues:

- updating information related to IROPI ("Imperative Reasons of Overriding Public Interest"), already recognized at the European Union level;
- obtaining a new opinion from the Superior Council of Public Works, despite a favorable opinion already issued for the preliminary project on 17 October 1994;
- requesting an assessment of the financial plan from the Transport Regulation Authority;
- clarifying issues related to an alleged 50% increase in contract value, in compliance with Article 72 of Directive 2014/24/EU on public procurement.

According to statements made by Pietro Ciucci, chief executive officer of Stretto di Messina S.p.A., a new CIPESS resolution was expected to be finalized by September 2026 and submitted with prior validation by the Court of Audit, potentially enabling the effective start of construction work.

== Belvedere dello Stretto ==
=== Concept and design ===
On 14 March 2024, Stretto di Messina S.p.A. made the designer's report public. On page 417, the idea of enhancing the bridge as a tourist attraction was introduced for the first time. The report mentions a panoramic belvedere located at the third crossbeam and on both towers, at a height of 374 meters.

3.5.1.10 Architectural Design of the Belvedere

As requested by Società Stretto di Messina during the meeting of 27 November 2023, recorded in minutes CS_005, the General Contractor shall further develop, during the Executive Design phase, a feasibility study concerning public panoramic access within both towers of the Crossing Structure.

The concept shall provide visitor access inside the structure either through service elevators reconfigured for this purpose or through additional elevators. The panoramic access point shall be located at the second or third crossbeam level.

The feasibility study shall necessarily take into account parameters such as visitor comfort (vibrations), infrastructure and public safety, landscape considerations, as well as structural and functional aspects. In any case, the surrounding conditions shall remain unchanged, including the fundamental characteristics (geometry and materials) of the tower legs.

Economic evaluations shall be deferred to the Executive phase.

Based on the above considerations, the following preliminary design concept is proposed.

— IL PROGETTISTA: Dott. Ing. Marco Orlandini, Ordine Ingegneri Roma n° 14340, From page 417 of the Designer's Report, 14 March 2024

=== Tourism enhancement of cross-elements ===
Palamara conceived a strategic vision for the "Tourism enhancement of cross-elements" (valorizzazione turistica dei trasversi) in February 2024. The project proposed transforming the structural crossbeams (transversal beams) of the bridge's deck into observatory decks or functional spaces for international tourism. This concept was officially presented to the Bridge Commission at Palazzo Zanca on 29 November 2024, emphasizing the bridge not only as a transport link but as a standalone destination.

The preliminary design was developed by Webuild, in dialogue with the technical proposals of engineer Giuseppe Palamara, while the Danish firm COWI, as was also the case for the executive design of the Messina Bridge project, is responsible for the detailed structural design and wind tunnel testing.

== Challenges and criticisms ==
The bridge has been regarded as highly controversial due to the impact of earthquakes, strong currents in the strait, concerns about disruption of bird migration routes, and possible infiltration of the mafia groups Cosa Nostra and 'Ndrangheta into construction projects.

Seismic activity and strong winds have been cited as the largest structural issues the bridge faces. The span must withstand earthquakes with a maximum intensity of 7.8 M_{w}, greater than the 1908 Messina earthquake.

Since its inception, the bridge has faced sustained opposition from environmental, civic, and territorial movements, especially in Messina. One of the most prominent groups has been Rete No Ponte, a network of associations and committees that since the early 2000s has organized public campaigns, legal challenges, assemblies, and large demonstrations involving tens of thousands of participants.

After the project was revived in 2023, Rete No Ponte was supplanted by new organizations, such as Assemblea NO ponte, Comitato No Ponte Capo Peloro, Invecedelponte, and youth-, university-, and teacher-based anti-bridge groups. Among them, Assemblea NO ponte in particular emerged as a broad, horizontally organized, and politically radical actor, structured as an open space for participation that brings together committees, collectives, associations, trade unions, and individual citizens. The group opposes not only the bridge itself but also the broader development model associated with large infrastructure projects, emphasizing grassroots participation, territorial defense, and criticism of the political and economic interests tied to the project.

Their activities include protests, public meetings, anti-expropriation campaigns, legal actions, and cultural initiatives. A major demonstration took place in August 2025, with thousands of people in Messina protesting against the bridge's construction.

Similar opposition movements have also emerged on the Calabrian side of the strait, particularly in Villa San Giovanni and Cannitello, where local committees have protested the expected environmental and social impacts of the bridge and related infrastructure projects.

== See also ==
- List of longest suspension bridge spans
- Scandinavian–Mediterranean Corridor
- Trans-European Transport Network
- Messina Type Deck
- Pylons of Messina
- Intercontinental and transoceanic fixed links
