= 2005 Alpine Skiing World Cup – Men's giant slalom =

2005 Men's giant slalom World Cup
Previous: 2004	Next: 2006

Men's giant slalom World Cup 2004/2005

== Calendar ==
Round	Race No	Place	Country	Date	Winner	Second	Third
1	1	Sölden	Austria	October 24, 2004	(United States) Bode Miller	(Italy) Massimiliano Blardone	(Finland) Kalle Palander
2	6	Beaver Creek	United States	December 4, 2004	(Norway) Lasse Kjus	(Austria) Hermann Maier	(Austria) Benjamin Raich
3	9	Val d'Isère	France	December 12, 2004	(United States) Bode Miller	(Norway) Lasse Kjus	(Austria) Hermann Maier
4	13	Alta Badia	Italy	December 19, 2004	(Canada) Thomas Grandi	(Austria) Benjamin Raich	(Austria) Hermann Maier (Switzerland) Didier Cuche
5	14	Flachau	Austria	December 21, 2004	(Canada) Thomas Grandi	(Switzerland) Didier Cuche	(United States) Bode Miller
6	19	Adelboden	Switzerland	January 11, 2005	(Italy) Massimiliano Blardone	(United States) Bode Miller	(Finland) Kalle Palander
7	29	Kranjska Gora	Slovenia	February 26, 2005	(Austria) Benjamin Raich	(Austria) Hermann Maier	(Finland) Kalle Palander
8	35	Lenzerheide	Switzerland	March 12, 2005	(Austria) Stephan Görgl	(United States) Bode Miller	(Austria) Benjamin Raich

== Final point standings ==
In Men's giant slalom World Cup 2004/05 all results count.

Place	Name	Country	Total points	1 (Austria)	6 (United States)	9 (France)	13 (Italy)	14 (Austria)	19 (Switzerland)	29 (Slovenia)	35 (Switzerland)
1	Benjamin Raich	Austria	423	20	60	3	80	50	50	100	60
2	Bode Miller	United States	420	100	-	100	-	60	80	-	80
3	Thomas Grandi	Canada	366	36	20	24	100	100	22	40	24
4	Hermann Maier	Austria	362	16	80	60	60	3	13	80	50
5	Massimiliano Blardone	Italy	345	80	18	20	36	12	100	50	29
6	Kalle Palander	Finland	303	60	15	40	-	32	60	60	36
7	Lasse Kjus	Norway	258	-	100	80	-	11	45	22	-
8	Davide Simoncelli	Italy	207	5	36	50	22	40	18	36	-
9	Stephan Görgl	Austria	206	3	45	26	6	-	-	26	100
10	Fredrik Nyberg	Sweden	203	32	-	18	15	24	40	29	45
11	Didier Cuche	Switzerland	198	29	-	29	60	80	-	-	-
12	Daron Rahlves	United States	178	-	-	16	32	45	-	45	40
13	Joël Chenal	France	164	50	7	32	29	-	26	-	20
14	Didier Défago	Switzerland	153	9	32	36	26	36	-	14	-
15	Manfred Mölgg	Italy	142	-	9	-	24	29	26	32	32
16	Erik Schlopy	United States	108	14	40	-	11	20	-	5	18
17	Aksel Lund Svindal	Norway	96	1	50	-	9	-	12	24	-
18	Aleš Gorza	Slovenia	88	-	-	2	-	45	29	16	26
19	Mirko Deflorian	Italy	85	-	-	45	40	-	-	-	-
20	Dane Spencer	United States	83	6	24	10	3	22	14	4	-
21	Rainer Schönfelder	Austria	77	40	11	13	-	13	-	-	-
22	Marco Büchel	Liechtenstein	70	10	26	6	-	-	15	13	-
23	Frédéric Covili	France	67	12	13	11	22	9	-	-	-
24	Jean-Philippe Roy	Canada	64	-	-	9	45	10	-	-	-
25	Arnold Rieder	Italy	60	24	18	-	-	18	-	-	-
	Michael Walchhofer	Austria	60	15	29	-	-	-	-	-	16
27	Christoph Gruber	Austria	58	-	-	4	-	-	36	-	22
28	Andreas Schifferer	Austria	52	29	-	5	-	-	-	18	-
29	Gauthier de Tessières	France	51	13	14	-	-	16	8	-	-
30	Lucas Senoner	Italy	50	-	-	-	16	14	-	20	-
31	Alberto Schieppati	Italy	49	22	-	14	-	-	-	13	-
32	Bruno Kernen	Switzerland	47	-	10	7	4	-	26	-	-
33	Hans Knauß	Austria	45	45	-	-	-	-	-	-	-
34	Niklas Rainer	Sweden	43	-	-	24	-	8	-	11	-
35	Marc Berthod	Switzerland	36	-	-	-	-	36	-	-	-
36	Peter Fill	Italy	32	-	-	12	-	-	20	-	-
	Truls Ove Karlsen	Norway	32	-	6	-	-	-	11	15	-
38	Bjarne Solbakken	Norway	31	-	5	8	7	5	-	6	-
39	Kjetil Jansrud	Norway	30	8	-	-	12	-	10	-	-
40	Kjetil André Aamodt	Norway	28	-	-	15	13	-	-	-	-
41	Andreas Nilsen	Norway	26	-	-	-	-	26	-	-	-
42	James Cochran	United States	25	-	-	-	18	-	-	7	-
43	Daniel Albrecht	Switzerland	24	-	24	-	-	-	-	-	-
44	Sami Uotila	Finland	20	2	-	-	8	-	-	10	-
45	Alexander Ploner	Italy	18	18	-	-	-	-	-	-	-
	Freddy Rech	France	18	-	12	-	-	-	6	-	-
47	Alessandro Roberto	Italy	16	-	-	-	10	6	-	-	-
48	Ondřej Bank	Czech Republic	14	-	-	-	14	-	-	-	-
	Mitja Valenčič	Slovenia	14	-	-	-	-	7	7	-	-
50	Giorgio Rocca	Italy	12	4	8	-	-	-	-	-	-
51	Ambrosi Hoffmann	Switzerland	11	11	-	-	-	-	-	-	-
52	Bernard Vajdič	Slovenia	9	-	-	-	-	-	9	-	-
	François Bourque	Canada	9	-	-	-	-	-	-	9	-
54	Thomas Fanara	France	8	-	-	-	-	-	-	8	-
55	Akira Sasaki	Japan	7	7	-	-	-	-	-	-	-
56	Christian Mayer	Austria	5	-	-	-	5	-	-	-	-
57	Tobias Grünenfelder	Switzerland	4	-	-	-	-	4	-	-	-

Note:

In the last race only the best racers were allowed to compete and only the best 15 finishers were awarded with points.

== Men's giant slalom team results ==
bold = highest score italics = race wins

Place	Country	Total points	1 (Austria)	6 (United States)	9 (France)	13 (Italy)	14 (Austria)	19 (Switzerland)	29 (Slovenia)	35 (Switzerland)	Racers	Wins
1	Austria	1288	168	**225**	111	151	66	95	224	248	9	1
2	Italy	1016	153	89	141	148	119	154	151	61	11	1
3	United States	814	120	64	126	64	147	94	61	138	5	2
4	Norway	201	9	161	103	41	42	78	67	-	7	1
5	Switzerland	473	49	66	72	90	120	62	14	-	7	0
6	Canada	439	36	20	33	145	110	22	49	24	3	2
7	Finland	323	62	15	40	8	32	60	70	36	2	0
8	France	308	75	46	43	51	25	40	8	20	5	0
9	Sweden	246	32	-	42	15	32	40	40	45	2	0
10	Slovenia	111	-	-	2	-	22	45	16	26	3	0
11	Liechtenstein	70	10	26	6	-	-	15	13	-	1	0
12	Czech Republic	14	-	-	-	14	-	-	-	-	1	0
13	Japan	7	7	-	-	-	-	-	-	-	1	0
