= FIS Alpine World Ski Championships 2007 – Men's giant slalom =

Event: Giant slalom Men

Date: 14 February 2007

1st run start time: 10:00 CET

2nd run start time: 13:00 CET

== Results ==
Rank	Athlete	Nation	1st run	2nd run	Behind
1	Aksel Lund Svindal	Norway	1:09.67	2:19.64	0
2	Daniel Albrecht	Switzerland	1:09.44	2:20.12	+0.48
3	Didier Cuche	Switzerland	1:09.98	2:20.56	+0.92
4	Ted Ligety	United States	1:10.09	2:20.63	+0.99
5	Alberto Schieppati	Italy	1:09.91	2:20.72	+1.08
6	Truls Ove Karlsen	Norway	1:10.19	2:21.00	+1.36
7	Kalle Palander	Finland	1:10.55	2:21.09	+1.45
7	Jean-Philippe Roy	Canada	1:10.24	2:21.09	+1.45
9	Mitja Valenčič	Slovenia	1:10.55	2:21.11	+1.47
10	Marco Büchel	Liechtenstein	1:10.48	2:21.26	+1.62
11	Marc Berthod	Switzerland	1:09.54	2:21.36	+1.72
12	John Kucera	Canada	1:11.58	2:21.41	+1.77
13	Didier Défago	Switzerland	1:10.08	2:21.44	+1.80
14	Niklas Rainer	Sweden	1:10.90	2:21.51	+1.87
15	Bode Miller	United States	1:09.92	2:21.65	+2.01
16	Thomas Fanara	France	1:11.05	2:21.73	+2.09
17	Ondřej Bank	Czech Republic	1:10.88	2:22.00	+2.36
18	Tim Jitloff	United States	1:10.98	2:22.23	+2.59
19	Manfred Mölgg	Italy	1:10.71	2:22.32	+2.68
20	André Myhrer	Sweden	1:11.06	2:22.35	+2.71
21	Hermann Maier	Austria	1:11.13	2:22.44	+2.80
22	Joël Chenal	France	1:11.35	2:22.57	+2.93
23	Peter Fill	Italy	1:11.18	2:22.68	+3.04
24	Jukka Rajala	Finland	1:11.25	2:22.75	+3.11
25	Rainer Schönfelder	Austria	1:11.07	2:22.90	+3.26
26	Bernard Vajdič	Slovenia	1:11.31	2:23.12	+3.48
27	Thomas Grandi	Canada	1:12.05	2:23.33	+3.69
28	Akira Sasaki	Japan	1:11.99	2:23.41	+3.77
29	Gauthier de Tessières	France	1:12.90	2:24.75	+5.11
30	Cristian Javier Simari Birkner	Argentina	1:12.64	2:25.99	+6.35
31	Aleksandr Khoroshilov	Russia	1:13.10	2:26.34	+6.70
32	Petr Záhrobský	Czech Republic	1:12.85	2:26.42	+6.78
33	Ferrán Terra	Spain	1:13.10	2:26.56	+6.92
34	Anton Konovalov	Russia	1:12.94	2:26.58	+6.94
35	Ivan Heimschild	Slovakia	1:13.28	2:26.69	+7.05
36	Stefan Georgiev	Bulgaria	1:13.48	2:26.84	+7.20
37	Jimmy Cochran	United States	1:11.39	2:26.88	+7.24
38	Petteri Kantola	Finland	1:11.89	2:26.99	+7.35
39	Natko Zrnčić-Dim	Croatia	1:13.60	2:27.46	+7.82
40	Jaroslav Babušiak	Slovakia	1:13.51	2:27.54	+7.90
41	Danko Marinelli	Croatia	1:13.64	2:28.47	+8.83
42	Min Heuk Kang	South Korea	1:14.40	2:28.73	+9.09
43	Guillem Capdevila	Spain	1:14.53	2:28.83	+9.19
44	Hugh Stevens	Australia	1:16.13	2:31.80	+12.16
45	Sascha Gritsch	Moldova	1:15.93	2:32.67	+13.03
—	François Bourque	Canada	1:09.51	DNF	—
—	Stephan Keppler	Germany	1:13.07	DNF	—
—	Bryce Stevens	Australia	1:13.36	DNF	—
—	Konstantin Sats	Russia	1:13.63	DNF	—
—	Benjamin Raich	Austria	DNF	—	—
—	Massimiliano Blardone	Italy	DNF	—	—
—	Hannes Reichelt	Austria	DNF	—	—
—	Aleš Gorza	Slovenia	DNF	—	—
—	Steve Missillier	France	DNF	—	—
—	Felix Neureuther	Germany	DNF	—	—
—	Marcus Sandell	Finland	DNF	—	—
—	Jens Byggmark	Sweden	DNF	—	—
—	Oscar Andersson	Sweden	DNF	—	—
—	Bjarne Solbakken	Norway	DNF	—	—
—	Noel Baxter	United Kingdom	DNF	—	—
—	Björgvin Björgvinsson	Iceland	DNF	—	—
—	Kryštof Krýzl	Czech Republic	DNF	—	—
—	Kilian Albrecht	Bulgaria	DNF	—	—
—	Filip Trejbal	Czech Republic	DNF	—	—
—	Urs Imboden	Moldova	DNF	—	—
—	Maui Gayme	Chile	DNF	—	—
—	Christophe Roux	Moldova	DNF	—	—
—	Demian Franzen	Australia	DNF	—	—
—	Alexey Chaadayev	Russia	DNF	—	—
—	Benjamin Griffin	New Zealand	DNF	—	—
—	Roger Vidosa	Andorra	DNF	—	—
—	Peter Lubellan	Slovakia	DNF	—	—
—	Dalibor Šamšal	Croatia	DNF	—	—
—	Vassilis Dimitriadis	Greece	DNF	—	—
—	Christoph Gruber	Austria	DQ	—	—
