= Davide Labate =

Italian alpine skiing commentator

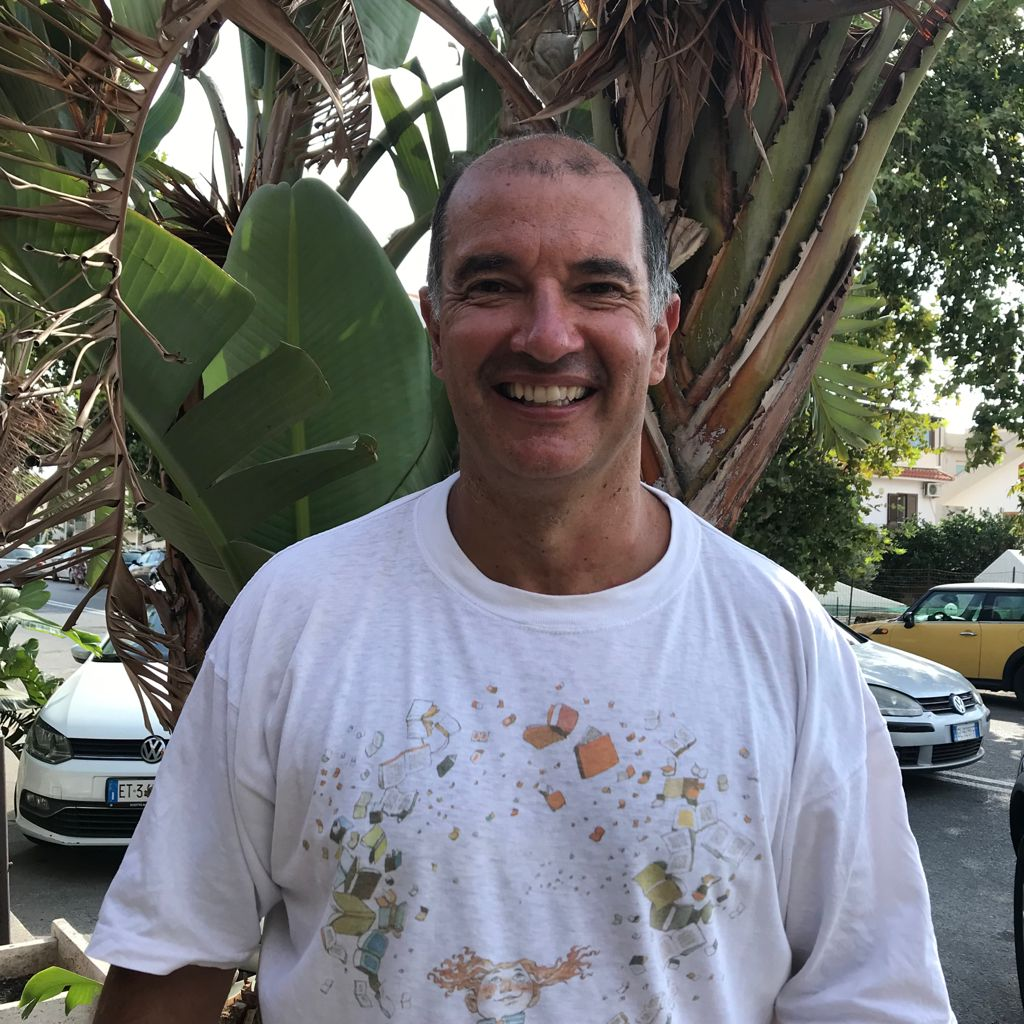
- Labate in 2021.
- Born: 18 September 1972 (age 53); Messina, Italy
- Citizenship: Italian
- Occupation(s): Journalist; Alpine skiing commentator
- Years active: 1993–present
- Television: Rai Sport

Davide Labate (born 18 April 1972) is an Italian journalist from 1993 and alpine skiing commentator, broadcasting for Rai Sport from 2009.

== Biography ==
A native of Messina, in the summer he returns to his Torre Faro, a seaside village near the Ganzirri Lake. In 2013 some members of the Italian national ski team, in Sicily for a dry training period in the summer, were guests at his home, among these Manfred Moelgg, Florian Eisath, Roberto Nani, Luca De Aliprandini, Dominik Paris, Werner Heel, Silvano Varettoni and Mattia Casse.

== Career ==
Voice RAI of the men's Alpine Ski World Cup, from the 2009–2010 season, up to the 2018–2019 season, he was joined by the former valanga azzurra skier Paolo De Chiesa. Starting from the 2019–2020 season, De Chiesa has been replaced by the former skier Max Blardone.
