= Torre Faro =

Italian seaside village

- Quartiere
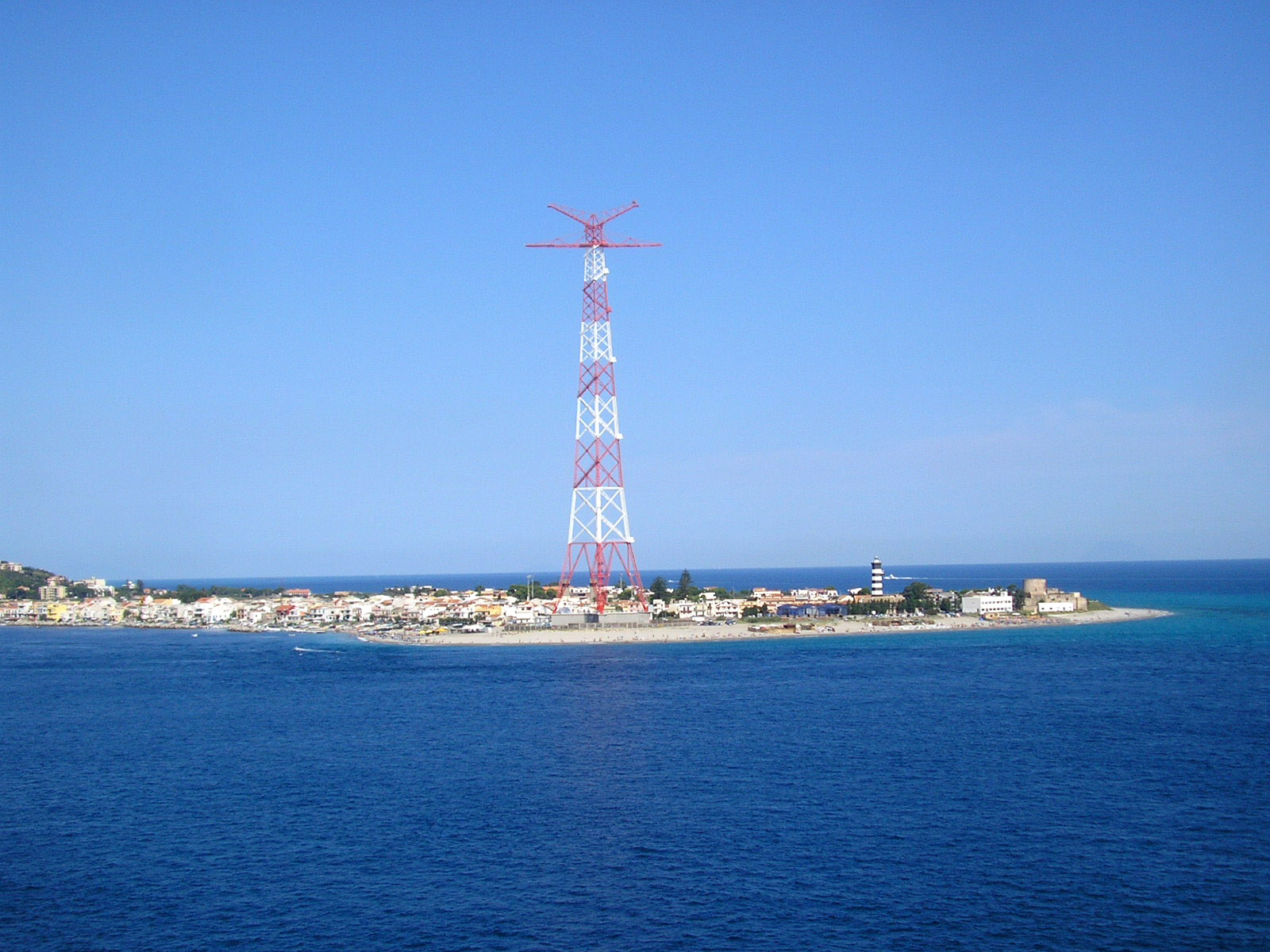
- A landscape of Torre Faro with the Pylons of Messina.
- Interactive map of Torre Faro
- Coordinates: 38°15′33″N 15°38′33″E
- Country: Italy
- Region: Sicily
- Metropolitan City: Metropolitan City of Messina
- Comune: Messina

Torre Faro is a neighbourhood in the north of Messina, Italy. It is a seaside village near the Ganzirri Lake and on its territory it hosts the Pylons of Messina.

== History ==
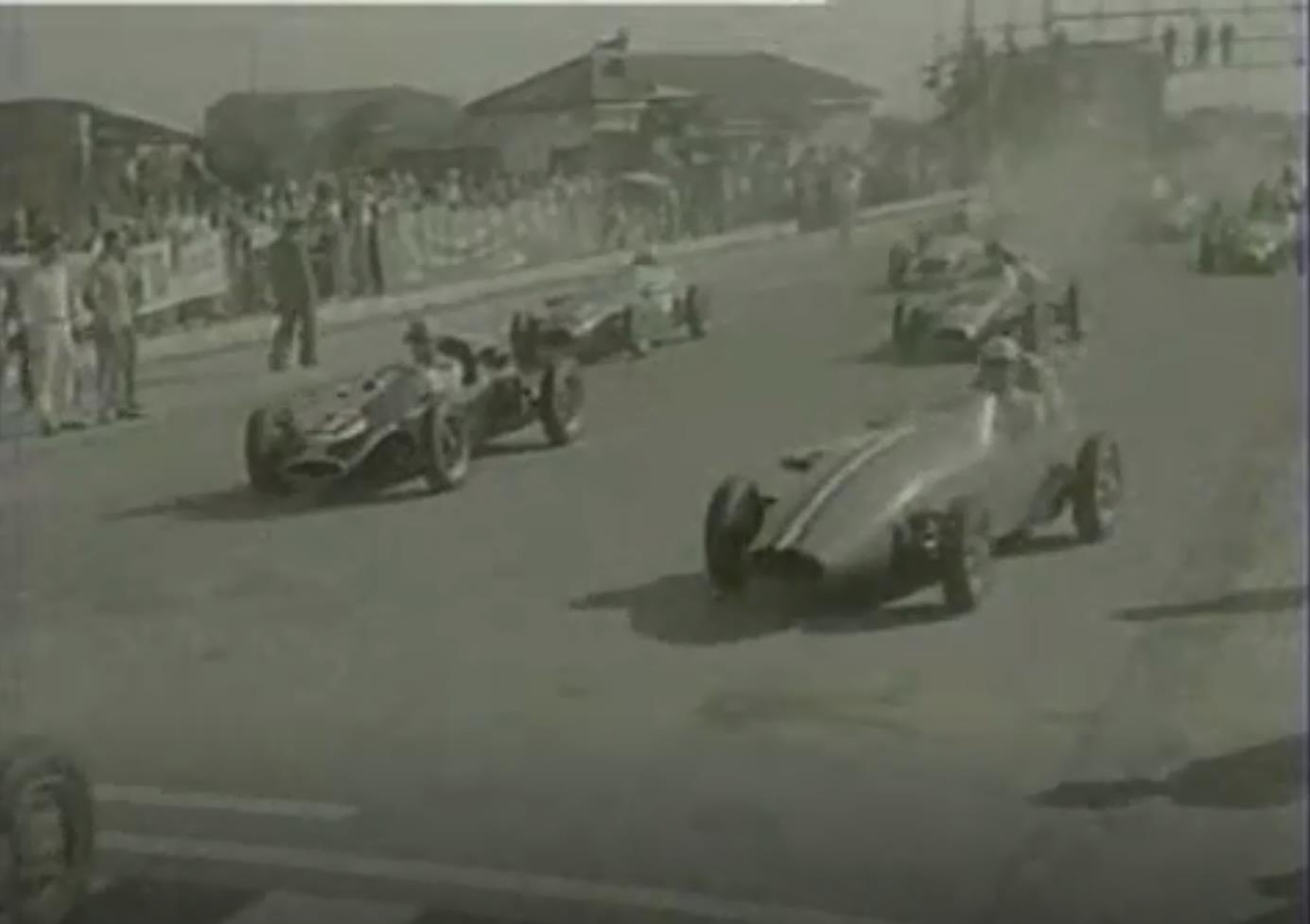
The start of the 1960 Messina Grand Prix.

From 1959 to 1961 on Torre faro Circuit took place the Messina Grand Prix (Italian: Gran Premio di Messina) a Formula Junior motor race held at Ganzirri Lake circuit (6,200 metres) in Messina, Italy, organized by the Automobile Club d'Italia. The race formed part of the Italian Formula Junior Championship. The planned Strait of Messina Bridge will connect Torre Faro with Villa San Giovanni when it opens in 2032 and it will become the longest suspension bridge in the world.

== Constructions of world interest ==
The Pylon of Torre Faro is one of the disused pylons of the 220 kV high voltage power line which for thirty years, from 1955 to 1985, crossed the Strait of Messina between Calabria and Sicily. With its height of 235 m it is one of the tallest buildings in Italy.

In the period of its use, the engineer Riccardo Morandi had designed two towers for anchoring high voltage cables, called Torri Morandi (Morandi Towers). Even this structure has not been demolished and is now housed in the Torre Faro car park.

== Gallery ==
Torre faro
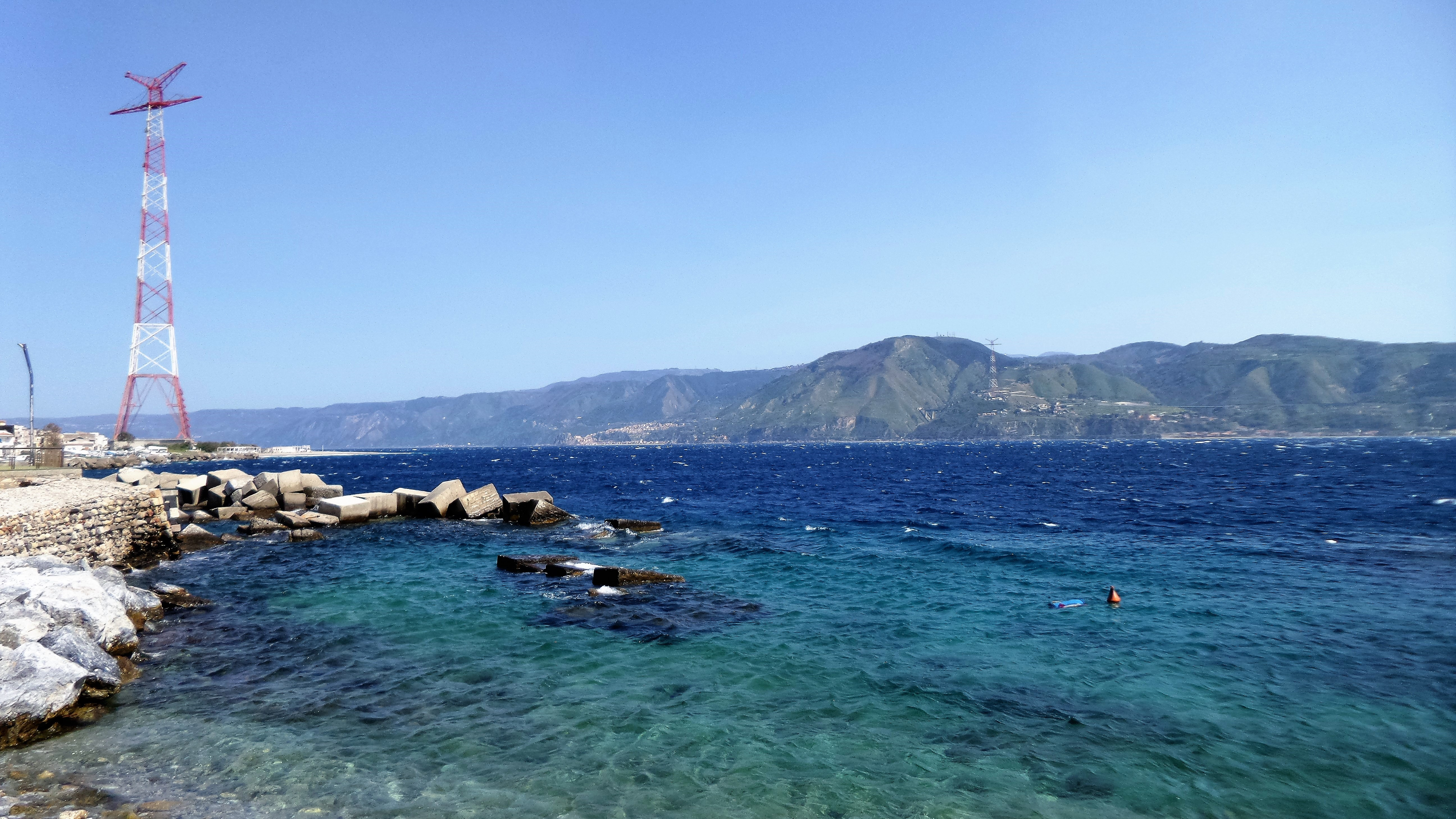
Capo Peloro

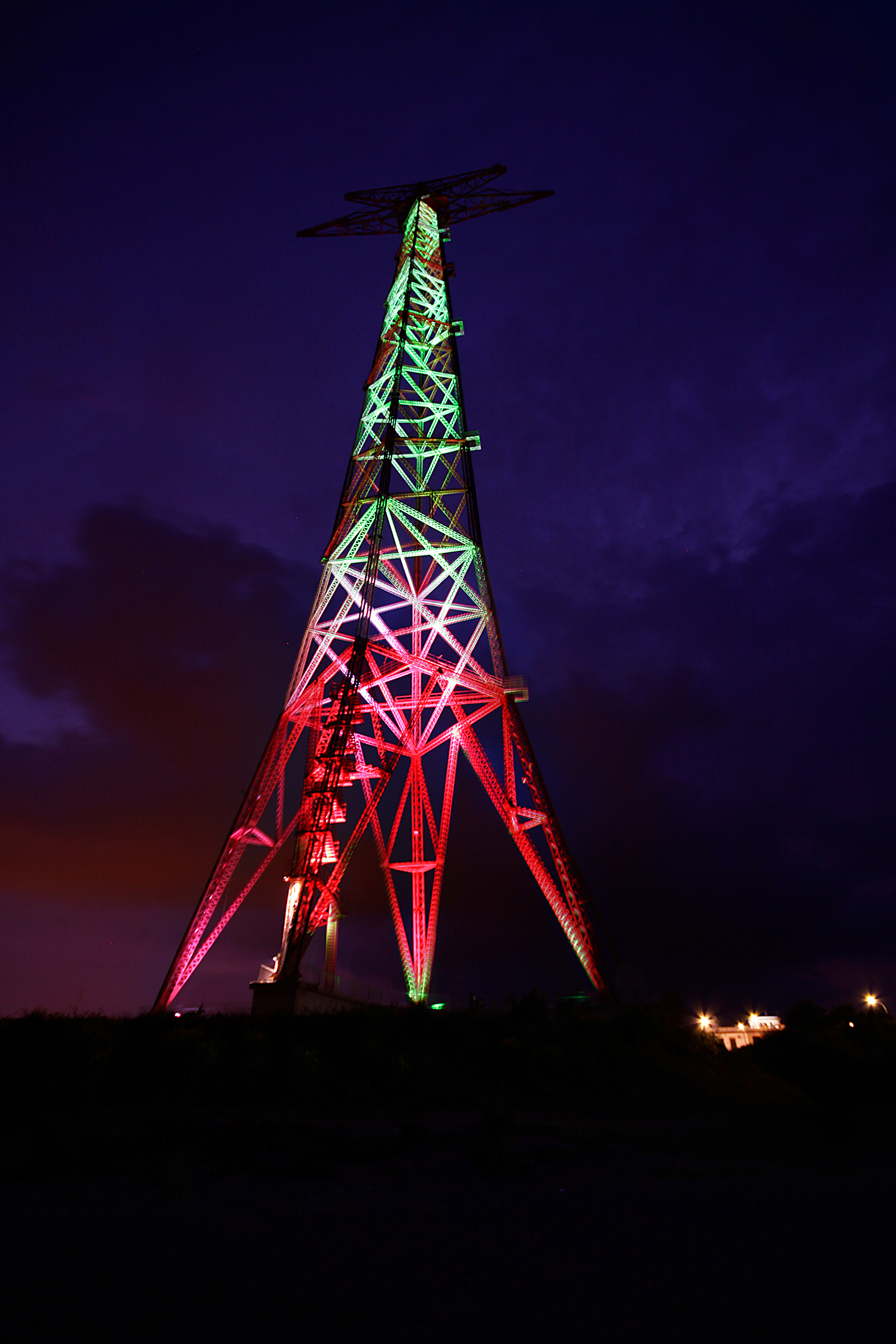
The Pylon by night

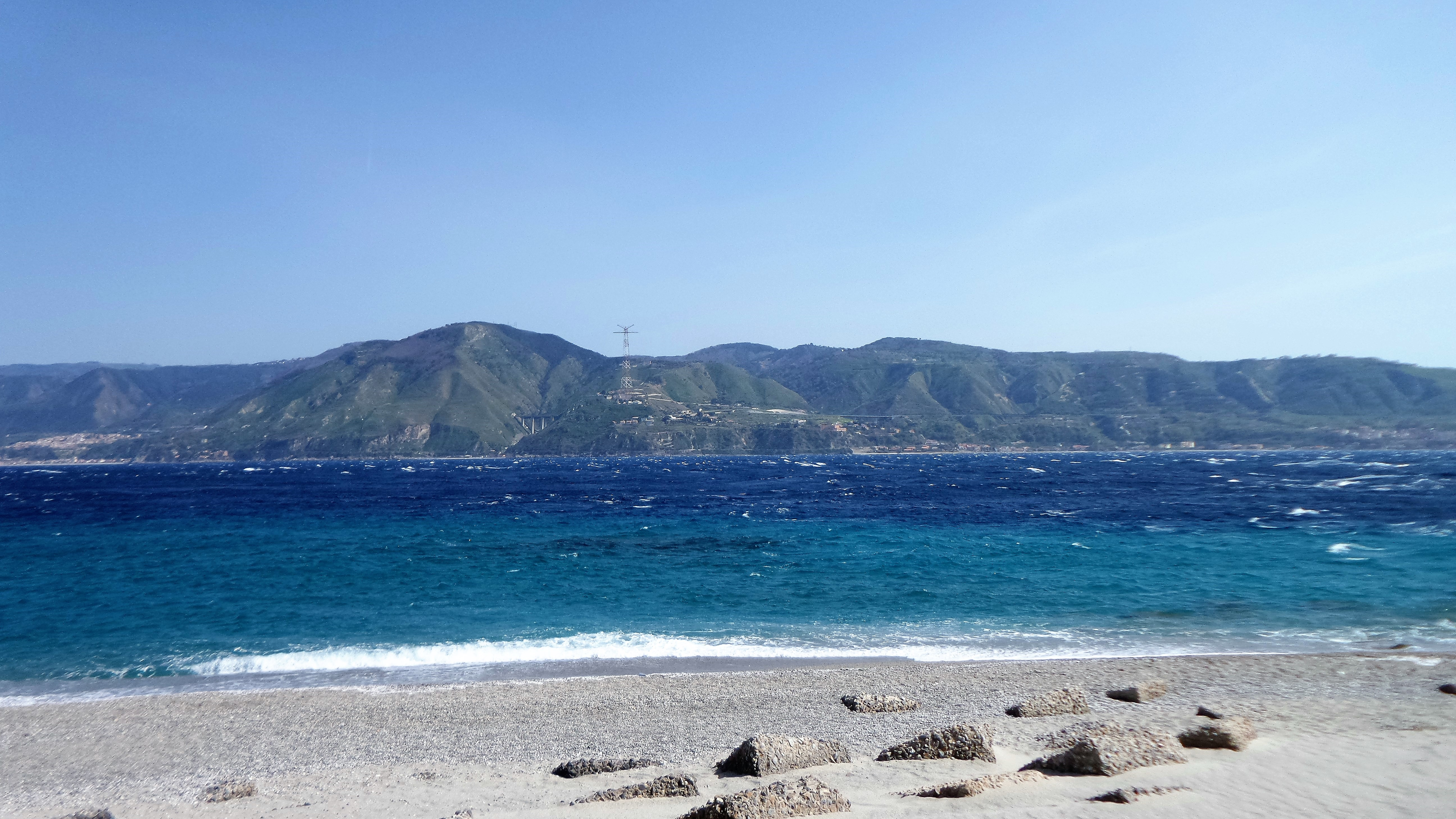
Strait of Messina view from Capo Peloro

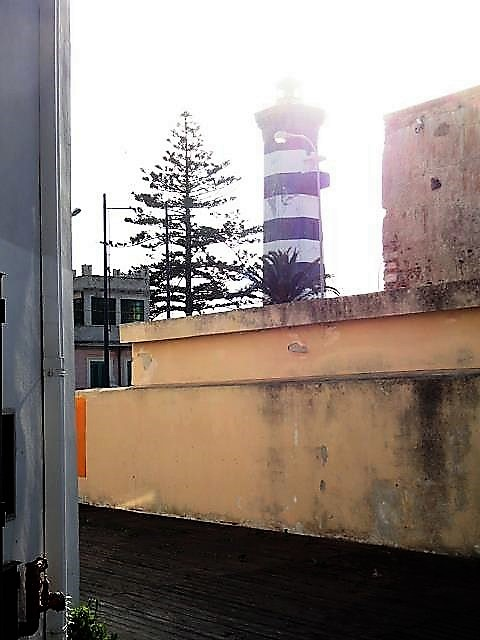
The Lighthouse.

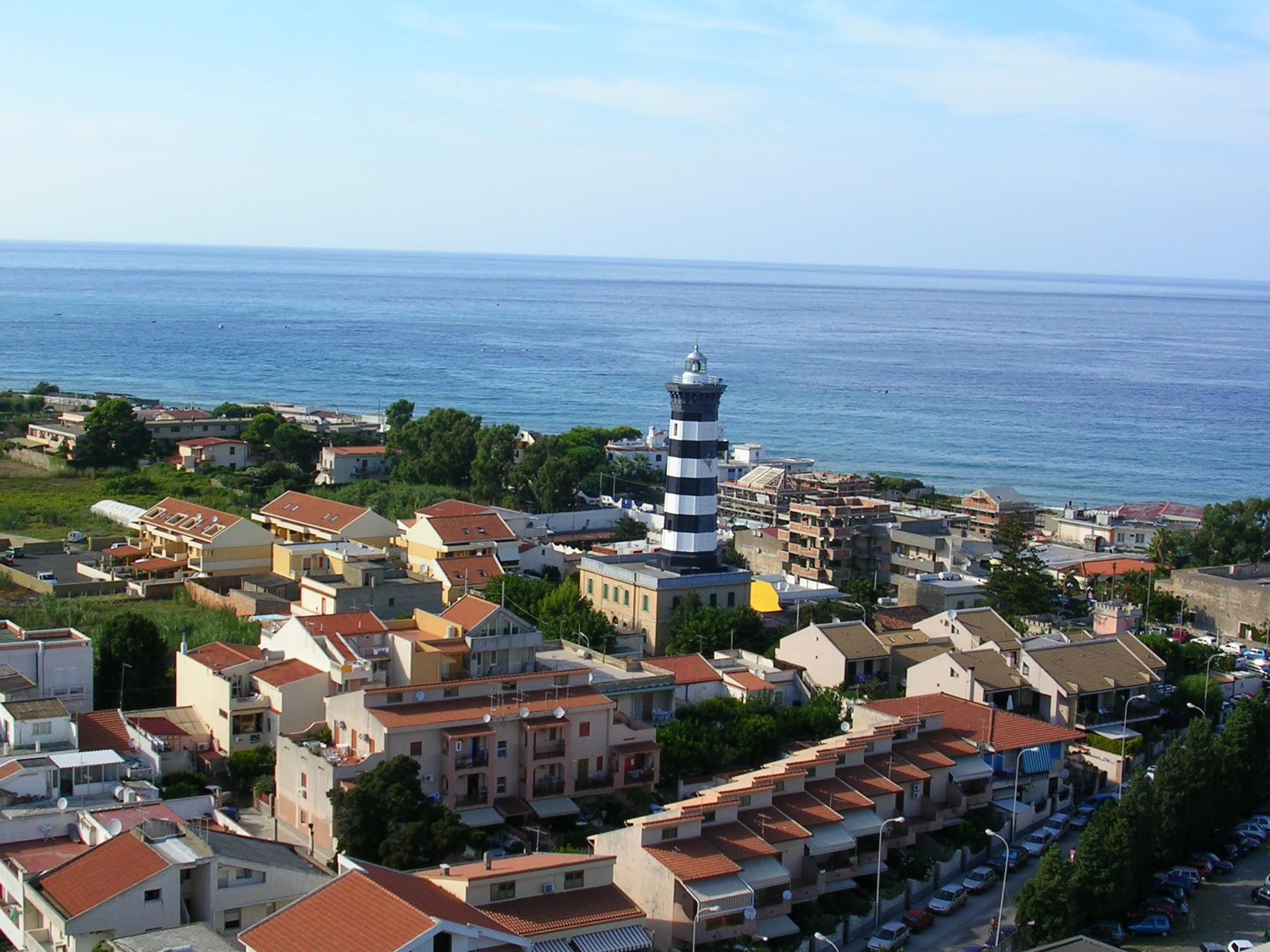
Aerial view

== See also ==
- Faro Point
- Ganzirri Lake
- Messina Grand Prix
- Peix Nicolau
- Pylons of Messina
- Strait of Messina
