= 1959 Messina Grand Prix =

Next race →
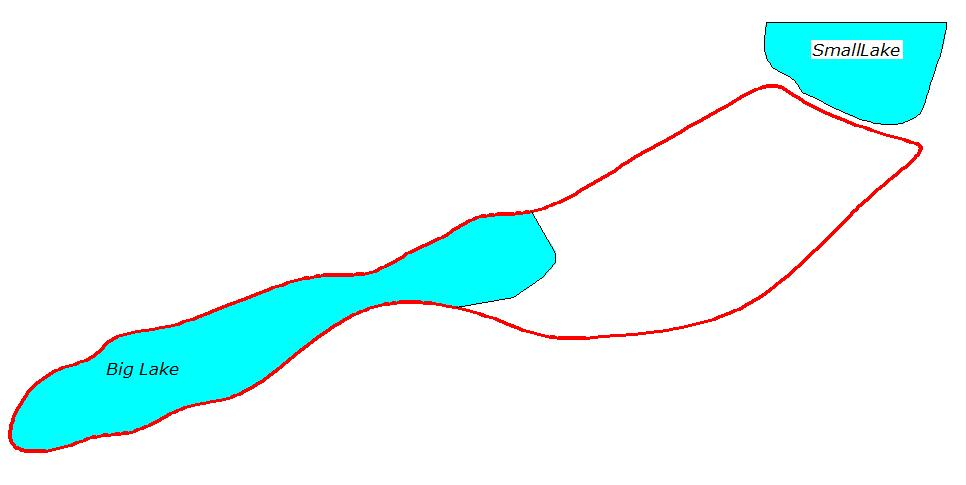

Race details
- Date: 23 August 1959
- Official name: Gran Premio di Messina
- Location: Messina, Italy
- Course length: 120.4 km
- Distance: 20 laps, 6.02 km

Fastest lap
Driver	(Italy) Raffaele Cammarota	Stanguellini
- Time: 2m30.3 on lap 143.904 km/h

Podium
First	(Brazil) Fritz d'Orey	Stanguellini
Second	(Brazil) Christian Bino Heins	Stanguellini
Third	(Italy) Raffaele Cammarota	Stanguellini

The 1st Messina Grand Prix was a motor race, run to Formula Junior rules, held on 23 August 1959 at Ganzirri Lake circuit in Messina, Italy. The race was part of the Italian Formula Junior Championship.

== Final standings ==
#	Driver	Country	Car	Time/Laps
1	Fritz d'Orey	Brazil	Stanguellini-Fiat	51m32.0
2	Christian Bino Heins	Brazil	Stanguellini-Fiat	20
3	Raffaele Cammarota	Italy	Stanguellini-Fiat	20
4	Berardo Taraschi	Italy	Taraschi-Fiat	20
5	Antonio Maglione	Italy	de Sanctis-Fiat	20
6	Henri Grandsire	France	Stanguellini-Fiat	20
7	Carmelo Genovese	Italy	Stanguellini-Fiat	19
8	Giacomo Russo	Italy	Stanguellini-Fiat	19
9	Domenico Lo Coco	Italy	Moretti-Fiat	
10	Jacques Jauson	France	Taraschi-Fiat	
