= Alberto Schieppati =

Italian alpine skier

Personal information
- Born: 7 June 1981 (age 45) Milan, Italy

Skiing career
- Sport: Alpine skiing
- Retired: 2011
- Disciplines: Technical events
- World Cup debut: 2002

Olympics
- Teams: 1

World Championships
- Teams: 2

World Cup
- Seasons: 10
- Wins: 0
- Podiums: 1

Alberto Schieppati (born 7 June 1981) is an Italian former alpine skier who competed in the 2006 Winter Olympics.

== Biography ==
In 2021, he replaced Max Blardone, who fell ill with COVID-19, as technical commentator for the men's races of the Cortina 2021 in RAI.

== World Cup results ==
=== Race podiums ===
- 1 podiums (Giant slalom)

Season
Season	Date	Location	Discipline	Place
2004	28 Apr 2004	(Slovenia) Kranjska Gora	Giant slalom	2nd

== World Championship results ==
Schiappati finished both times in the top 10 at his two participations in the world championships.

Year	Age	Slalom	Giant slalom	Super-G	Downhill	Combined
2003	22	—	5	—	—	—
2007	25	—	8	—	—	—
