= Paolo De Chiesa =

Italian alpine skier

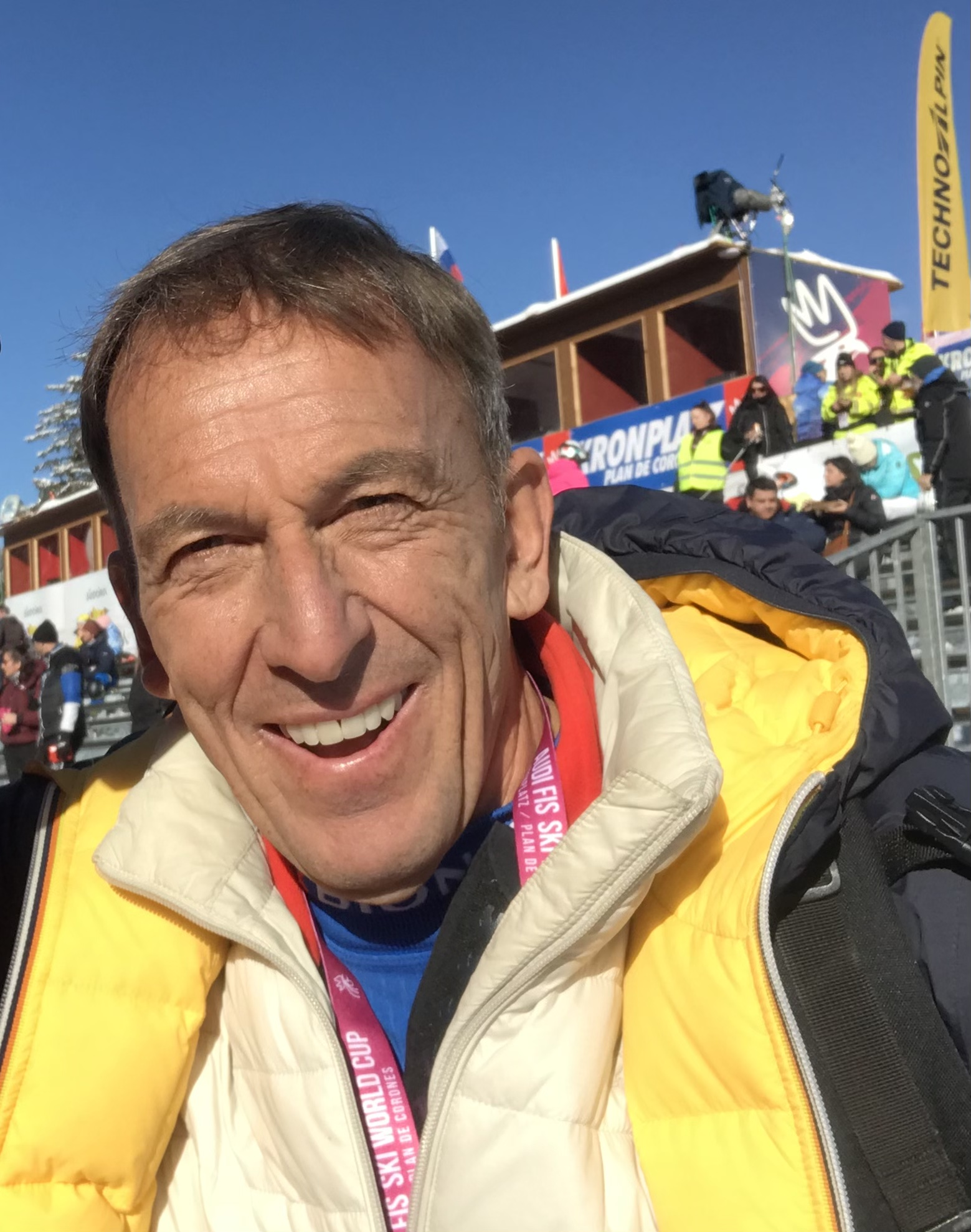
- Paolo De Chiesa in 2023 at 67.

Personal information
- Born: 14 March 1956 (age 70) Saluzzo, Italy

Skiing career
- Sport: Alpine skiing
- Retired: 1986
- Disciplines: Technical events
- World Cup debut: 1975

Olympics
- Teams: 2
- Medals: 0

World Championships
- Teams: 3
- Medals: 0

World Cup
- Seasons: 12
- Wins: 0
- Podiums: 12
Medal record
World Cup race podiums
Event	1st	2nd	3rd
Slalom	0	4	8
Giant slalom	0	0	0
Total	0	4	8

Paolo De Chiesa (born 14 March 1956) is an Italian journalist and former alpine skier who competed in the 1980 Winter Olympics and in the 1984 Winter Olympics.

De Chiesa has been a technical commentator for RAI in ski races for several years.

== Biography ==
He was born in Saluzzo, Piedmont. De Chiesa competed in two Olympic slalom events but was not able to finish one of these races. He also scored several podium placements in the Alpine Skiing World Cup.

== Journalistic career ==
After retiring from competitions, he devoted himself to journalism, first in Telemontecarlo and then as a contributor to various specialized magazines. Since 1993 he has been a sports commentator for Rai, for which he deals with the commentary of men's alpine skiing competitions, supporting first Furio Focolari, then Carlo Gobbo, then Davide Labate.

== World Championships results ==
Year
Year	Age	Slalom	Giant slalom	Downhill	Combined
1980	23	DNF1	-	-	-
1982	25	4	-	-	-
1985	28	6	-	-	-
