= Pylons of Messina =

Historic high-voltage towers in Italy

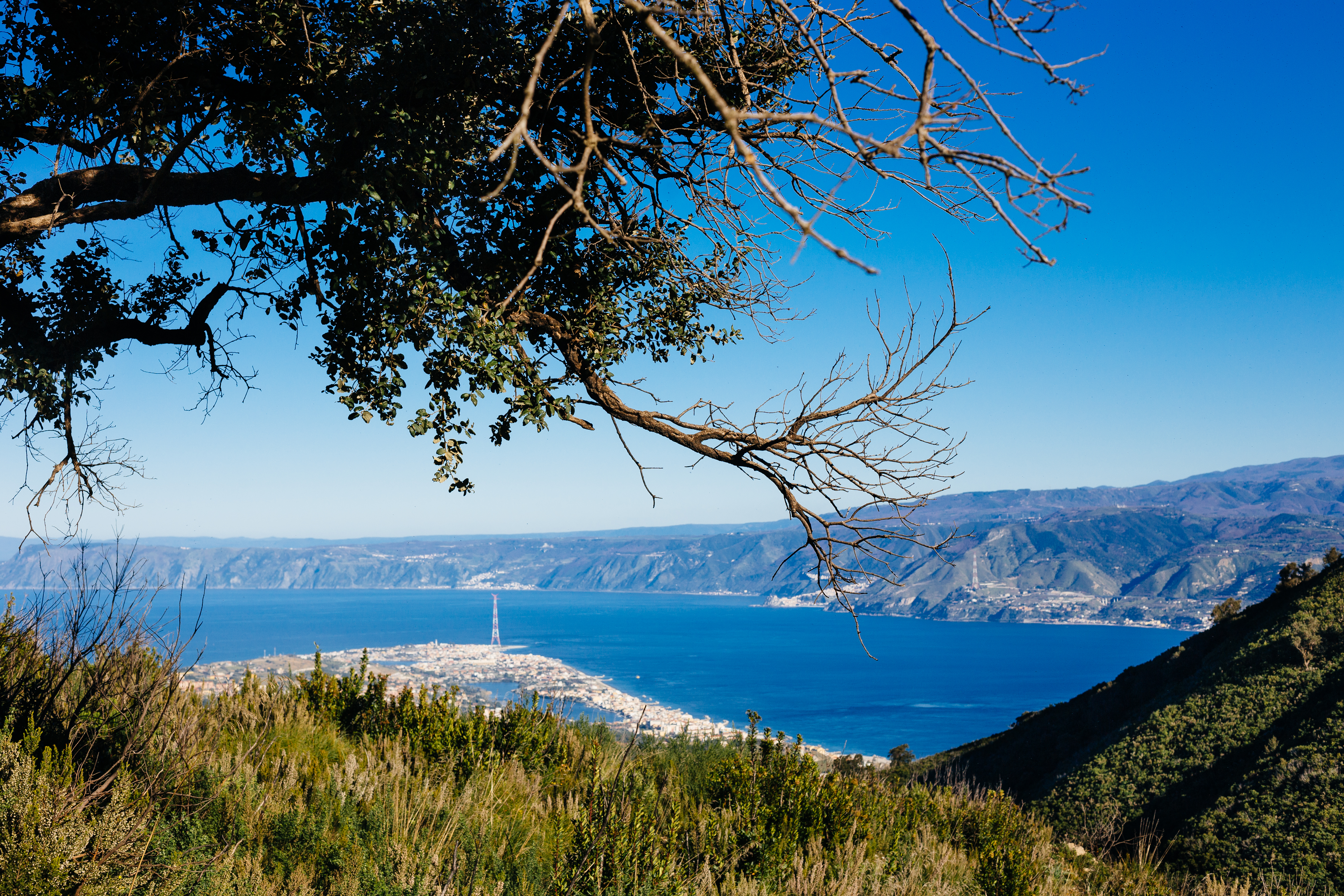
- Pylons of Messina: Torre Faro, Sicily (left) and Villa San Giovanni, Calabria (right)
- Map of Pylons of Messina

Location
- Country: Italy
- From: Torre Faro
- Passes through: Strait of Messina
- To: Villa San Giovanni

Construction information
- Commissioned: 1955
- Decommissioned: 1994

The Pylons of Messina are two free-standing steel towers in southern Italy, one in Sicily at Torre Faro and one in Calabria at Villa San Giovanni. They were used from 1955 to 1994 to carry a 220 kilovolt (150 kilovolt until 1971) power line across the Strait of Messina, between the Scilla substation in Calabria on the Italian mainland at 38°14′42″N 15°40′59″E and the Messina-Santo substation in Sicily at 38°15′57″N 15°39′04″E.

== Design ==
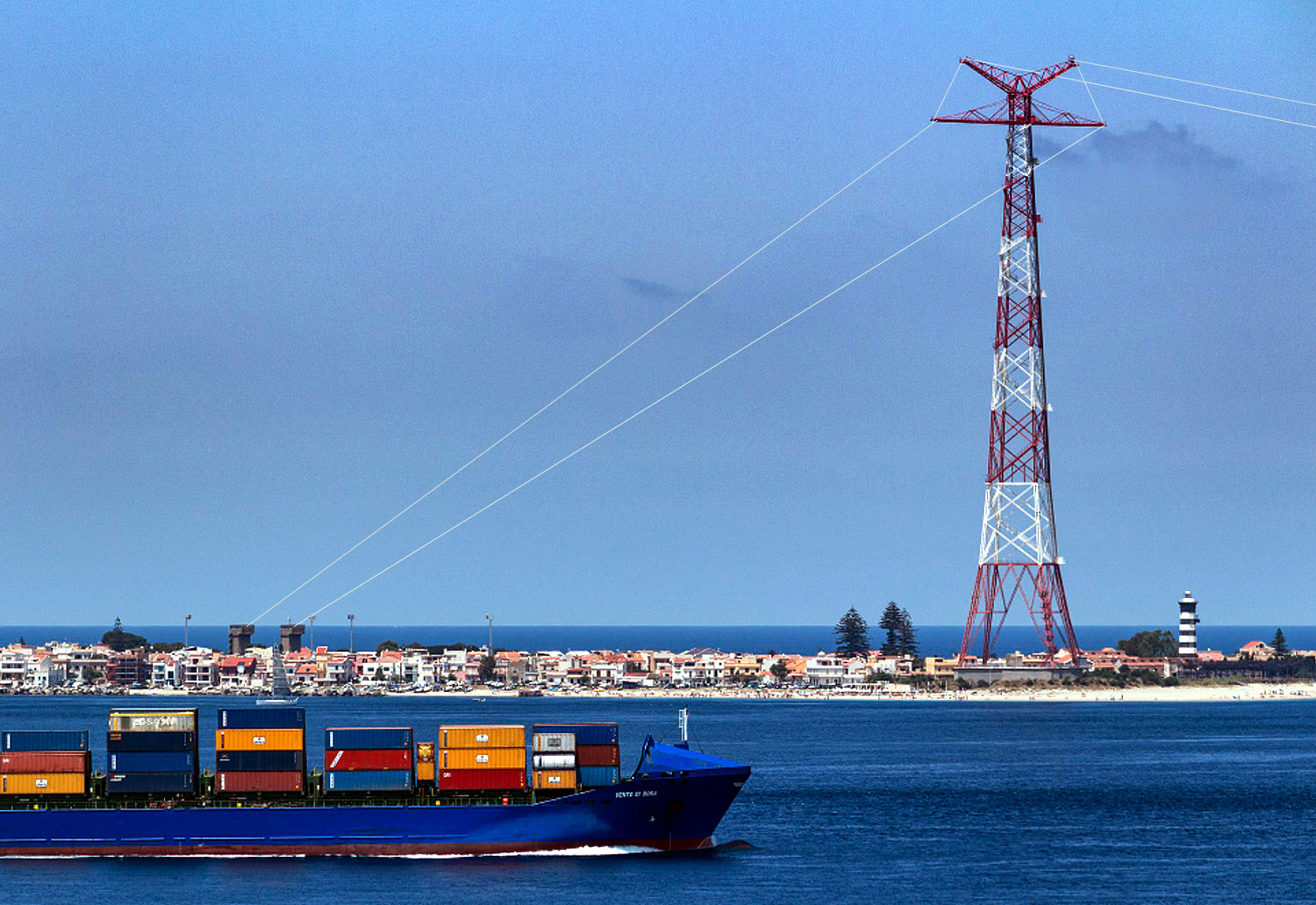
Overhead line mast in Torre Faro; lines added on the image indicate the path of the removed power lines leading to Morandi Towers

The two pylons, built in 1955, are both 232-metre-high (761 ft) free-standing steel towers. Each stands on an 8-metre-high (26 ft) cross-shaped base and is equipped with a crossbar that carries four conductors at a height of 212 metres (696 ft), and another V-shaped structure at the top which carries two additional conductors in addition to ground wires. In contrast to more conventional pylon design, the corners of the pylons are arranged diagonally along the direction of the course of the line. The pylons of Messina were the model for the Elbe Crossing 1 in Germany and were, until the completion of Elbe Crossing 2, the tallest pylons in the world. At the time, they had the longest span of any hydroelectric crossing ever built at 3646 meters, but not as much as now the span of 5376 m of the Ameralik Span in Greenland. The span was able to be so large because there wasn't a need for a high clearance, the conductors weren't as heavy and because the east tower was built on elevated ground approximately 163 m (536 ft) above sea level, giving the tower a total elevation of 396 m (1,300 ft) above sea level.

After their completion, the oscillation of the structures and their maximum deflections were determined in a very unusual manner: engineers mounted three rockets with a thrust of 9.8 kilonewtons on top of the pylons and ignited them.

The line had switching stations at each end of the span. At the Calabrian station, Cannitello, (38°14′29.16″N 15°41′20.27″E), the conductors were fixed tightly to a strainer portal. At the Sicilian station at Torre Faro (38°16′8″N 15°38′45″E), the conductors were strained by a device providing constant force, which was situated in a building with two inspiring towers, the so-called Morandi Towers (italian Torri Morandi), designed by the Italian builder Riccardo Morandi.

== Conductors ==
Until 1971, the electrical service consisted of a single 150 kV three-phase AC system. Four conductors, of which one was used as backup, were installed on the crossbar of the pylon. In 1971 the voltage was increased to 220 kV and two additional conductors were installed at the bottom site of the V-shaped pinnacles. This gave a total transmission capacity of 300 MW.

Conductors consisting of steel and aluminium with a diameter of 27.8 mm were used. They had an aluminium cross section of 45 mm^{2} and a steel cross section of 305 mm^{2}. The minimum height of the conductors over the Strait of Messina was 70 metres, to allow large ships to pass safely below. This, together with the span of 3.646 kilometres (2.266 mi), required a tension force of 608 N/mm^{2} in the conductor cables. Antivibration ropes were used to dampen oscillations.

By the early 1980s, this transmission capacity was no longer sufficient. It could not be increased by using bundle conductors or more conductive cables, as bundle conductors tend to have much greater wind-induced oscillations than single conductors, which can result in short circuits in such a long span. Normal overhead lines use conducting cables with a larger aluminium portion but these do not have the tensile strength needed for this span. In 1985 a 380 kV three-phase AC submarine cable with a maximum transmission capacity of 1000 MW was laid underneath the Strait of Messina.

The electrical crossing was decommissioned in 1993 and the conductors were removed a year later.

== Today ==
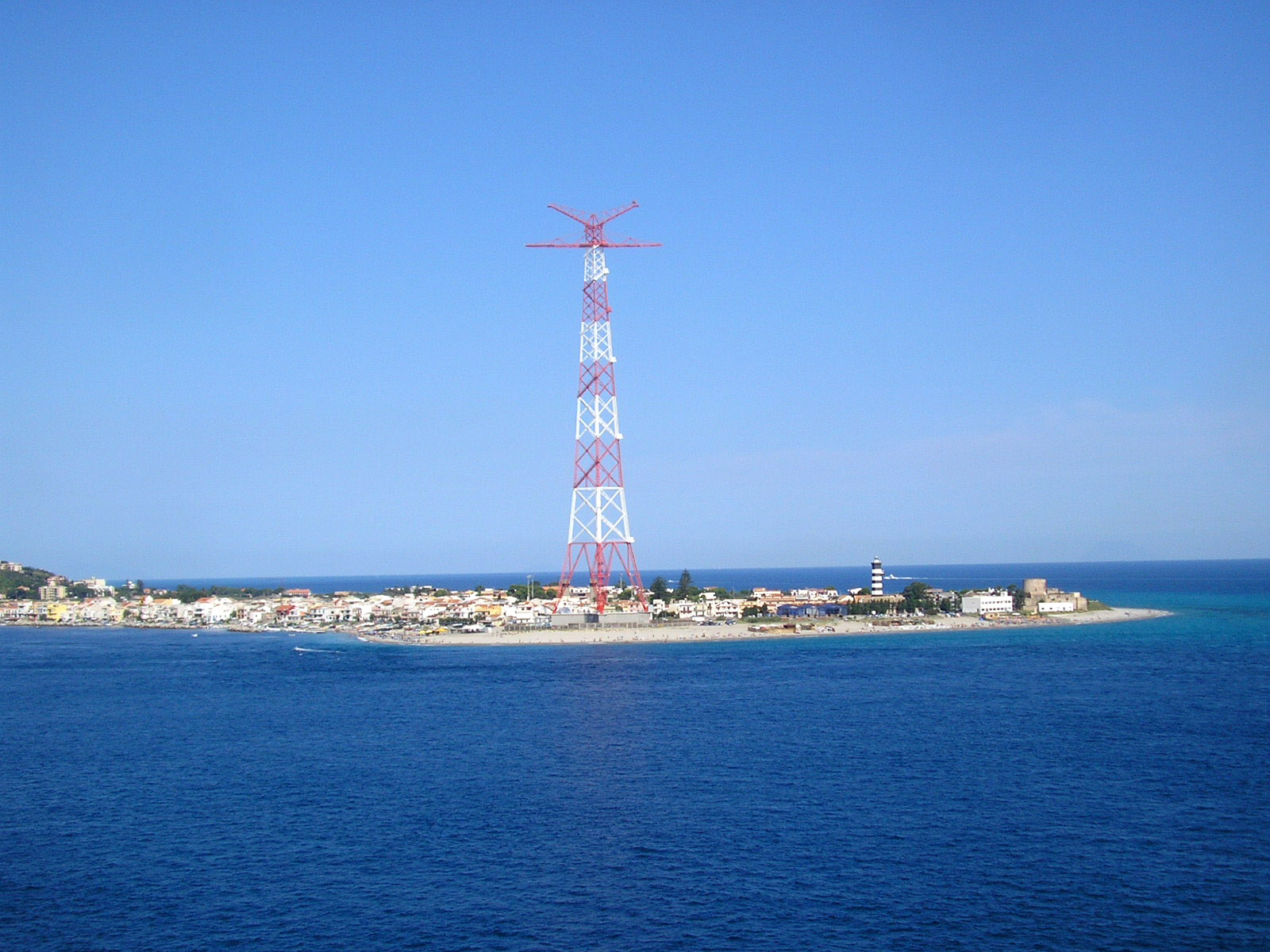
The former electricity pylon at Torre Faro was briefly open to visitors in 2006.

After the removal of the power lines, the pylons remain with protected status as historical monuments and are used for meteorological measurements, high distance rescue training and telecommunications. In 2006, the staircase to the top of the Sicilian pylon was briefly opened to the public, but public access to the structure is now prohibited. The stairway to the top has approximately 1,250 steps.

The switching stations at both ends of the span still exist. The former anchor portal at Cannitello Switching Station is still in place but the tensioning system at Torre Faro has been dismantled. The unused power line from Scilla substation to Cannitello remains, while the line from Torre Faro Switching Station to Messina-Santo substation may be completely dismantled.

On July 10, 2024, Estonian athlete Jaan Roose crossed the Strait of Messina on a slackline spanned between the two towers. He surpassed the previous longest slackline walk of 2,710 meters and completed a distance of 3,600 meters.

== Messina Strait submarine cable ==
The submarine cable across the Strait of Messina was laid in 1985. It has a total transmission capacity of 1000 MW and is a part of the single-circuit 380 kV powerline between Rizziconi substation on the Calabrian mainland (38°26′32″N 15°59′8″E) and Sorgente substation on Sicily (38°11′17″N 15°17′1″E). It starts at the end of the overhead line south of Villa San Giovanni (38°12′11.8″N 15°38′16.47″E), enters the sea at 38°12′13.4″N 15°38′0.91″E, reaches Sicily in Messina (38°12′57.76″N 15°34′1.79″E) and ends north of Messina (38°13′43.11″N 15°33′40.2″E), where the overhead line to Sorgente starts.

The cable consists of 4 conductors, one of which serves as a reserve.

== Second 380 kV cable ==
Plans were announced in July 2010 to build a second 380 kV power line between Sorgente and Rizziconi in 2015. The line will have a transmission capacity of 2000 MW and will be 105 kilometres (65 mi) long, with an undersea portion of 38 kilometres (24 mi).

In May 2016 a double-circuit 380 kV HVAC (high voltage alternating current) land and submarine cable system was handed over to the utility company. It was installed along a total route of approximately 44 km between the power stations of Villafranca Tirrena in Sicily and Scilla in Calabria.

== Similar structures ==
The largest towers of the Zhoushan Island Overhead Powerline Tie are of a very similar design, but are tubular lattice steel towers.

== See also ==
- List of towers
- Malta-Sicily interconnector – Submarine power cable
- Messina Bridge
