= 1960 Messina Grand Prix =

← Previous race	Next race →
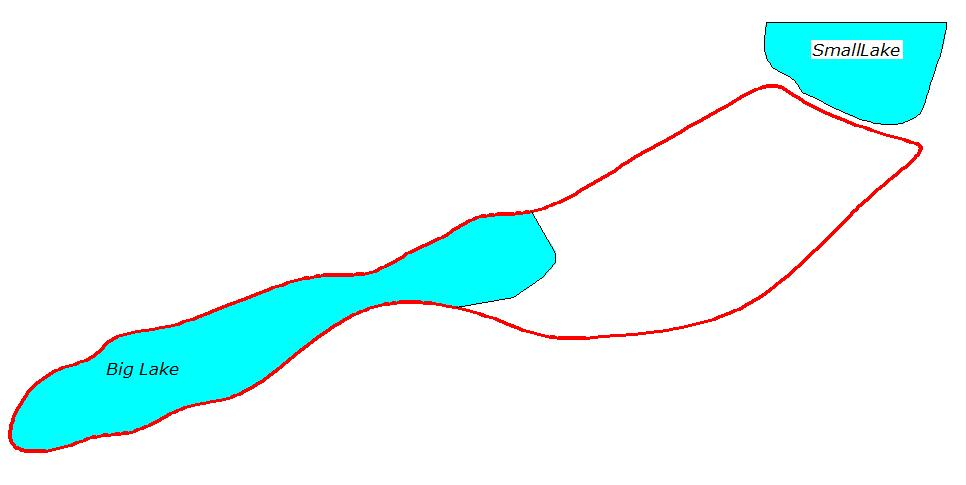

Race details
- Date: 31 July 1960
- Official name: Gran Premio di Messina
- Location: Messina, Italy
- Course length: 108.36 km
- Distance: 20 laps, 6.02 km

Pole position
Driver	(United Kingdom) Colin Davis	OSCA

Fastest lap
Driver	(United Kingdom) Colin Davis	OSCA
- Time: 2m26.0 on lap (148.438 km/h)

Podium
First	(United Kingdom) Colin Davis	OSCA
Second	(New Zealand) Denis Hulme	Cooper
Third	(Italy) Lorenzo Bandini	Stanguellini

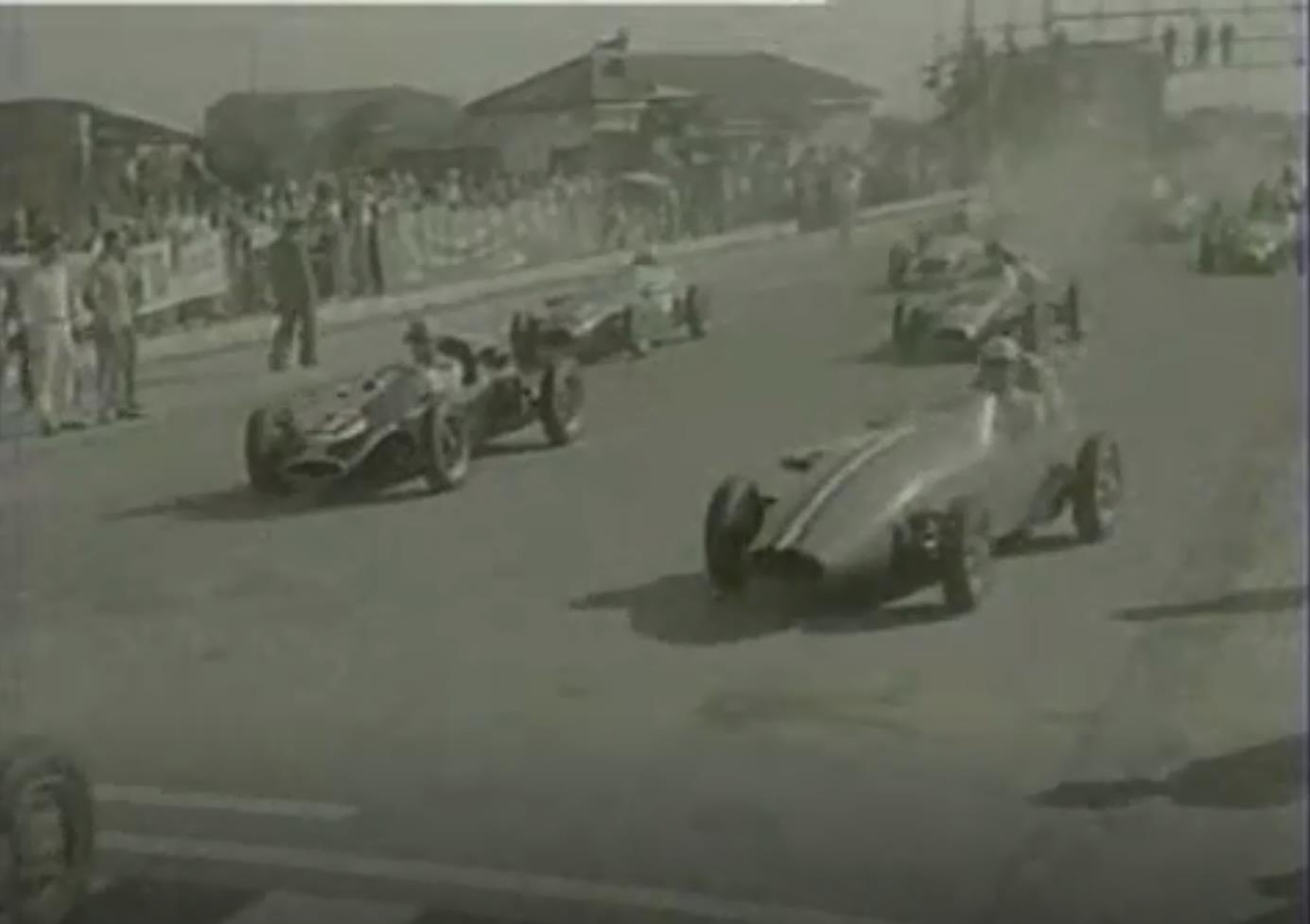
The start of the race

The 2nd Messina Grand Prix was a motor race, run to Formula Junior rules, held on 31 July 1960 at Ganzirri Lake circuit in Messina, Italy. The race was part of the Italian Formula Junior Championship.

== Final standings ==
#	Driver	Country	Car	Time/Laps
1	Colin Davis	United Kingdom	OSCA-Fiat	44m20.0
2	Denis Hulme	New Zealand	Cooper-BMC	18
3	Lorenzo Bandini	Italy	Stanguellini-Fiat	18
4	Joseph Siffert	Switzerland	Stanguellini-Fiat	18
5	Berardo Taraschi	Italy	Taraschi-Fiat	18
6	Jacques Cales	France	Stanguellini-Fiat	18
7	Roberto Lippi	Italy	Stanguellini-Fiat	17
8	Geki	Italy	Stanguellini-Fiat	17
9	Giuseppe Faranda	Italy	de Sanctis-Fiat	17
10	Rolf Markl	Austria	Poggi-Fiat	17
