= Messina Grand Prix =

- Ganzirri Lake circuit
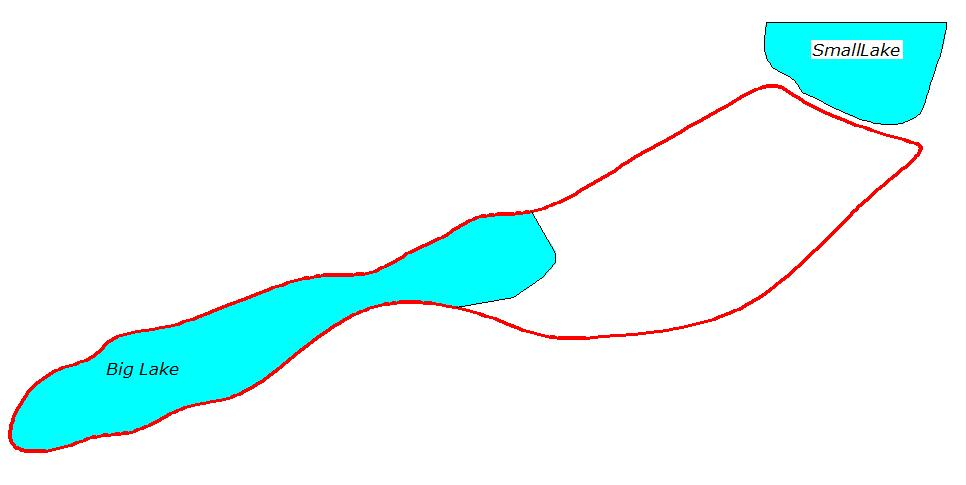

Race information
- Number of times held: 3
- First held: 1959
- Last held: 1961
- Most wins (drivers): no repeat winners
- Most wins (constructors): no repeat winners
- Circuit length: 6.02 km (3.8502 miles)
- Race length: 310.0 km (192.51 miles)
- Laps: 20 laps

Last race (1961)

Pole position
- (Italy) Lorenzo Bandini; Lotus 20; 2:14.4

Podium
- 1. (New Zealand) Angus Hyslop; Lotus 20; 46:04.3; 2. (New Zealand) Denny Hulme; Cooper T56; 46:21.6; 3. (Italy) Giacomo Russo; Lotus 20; 46:26.7

Fastest lap
- (Italy) Lorenzo Bandini; Lotus 20; 2:13.9

The Messina Grand Prix (Italian: Gran Premio di Messina) a Formula Junior motor race held at Ganzirri Lake circuit (6,200 metres) in Messina, Italy, organized by the Automobile Club d'Italia. The race formed part of the Italian Formula Junior Championship.

== Winners ==
Year	Date	Winning driver	Winning constructor	Details
1959	23 August	(Brazil) Fritz d'Orey	Stanguellini-Fiat	
1960	31 July	(United Kingdom) Colin Davis	OSCA-Fiat	
1961	23 July	(New Zealand) Angus Hyslop	Lotus-Ford	

== See also ==
- 10 Hours of Messina
