= Mitja Valenčič =

Slovenian alpine skier (born 1978)

Personal information
- Born: 1 February 1978 (age 48) Cerklje na Gorenjskem, SR Slovenia, SFR Yugoslavia
- Height: 5 ft 10 in (178 cm)

Skiing career
- Sport: Alpine skiing
- Club: TRG – ASK Triglav Kranj
- Disciplines: Giant slalom, slalom
- World Cup debut: January 1997 (age 18)

Olympics
- Teams: 3

World Championships
- Teams: 6

World Cup
- Seasons: 16

Mitja Valenčič (born 1 February 1978 in Cerklje na Gorenjskem) is a Slovenian alpine skier, specialized in slalom.

Valenčič represented Slovenia at the 2006 and 2010 Winter Olympics where he was on 6th place. His best result in the Alpine Skiing World Cup is the 4th place in slalom (Zagreb, 2010).
