= Niklas Rainer =

Swedish alpine skier and coach (born 1983)

Personal information
- Nationality: Sweden
- Born: 9 May 1983 (age 43)

Sport
- Sport: Skiing
- Club: Malungs SLK

Niklas Rainer (born 9 May 1983) is a Swedish alpine skier and coach.
