= Lago di Ganzirri =

Lake in Sicily, Italy

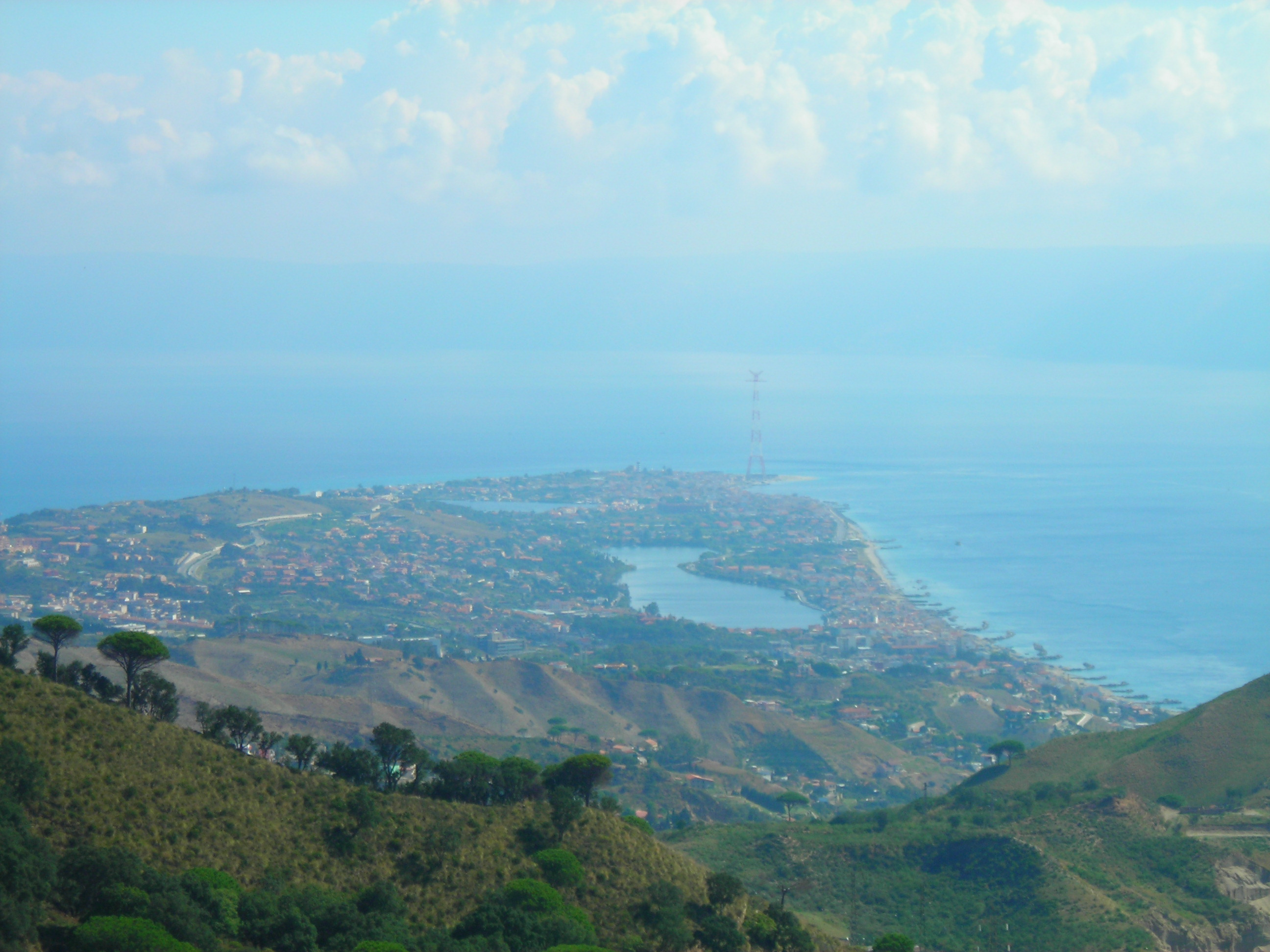

- Location within Sicily
- Location: Province of Messina, Sicily
- Coordinates: 38.261098°N 15.617194°E
- Basin countries: Italy
- Surface area: 0.338 km^{2} (0.131 sq mi)
- Surface elevation: 1 m (3 ft 3 in)

Lago di Ganzirri is a lake in the Province of Messina, Sicily, Italy. At an elevation of 1 m, its surface area is .338 km^{2}.

== Features ==
Together with the lake of Torre Faro it has been declared a particularly important asset of ethno-anthropological interest, as it is the historical site of traditional production activities related to mussel and telliniculture.

== Gallery ==
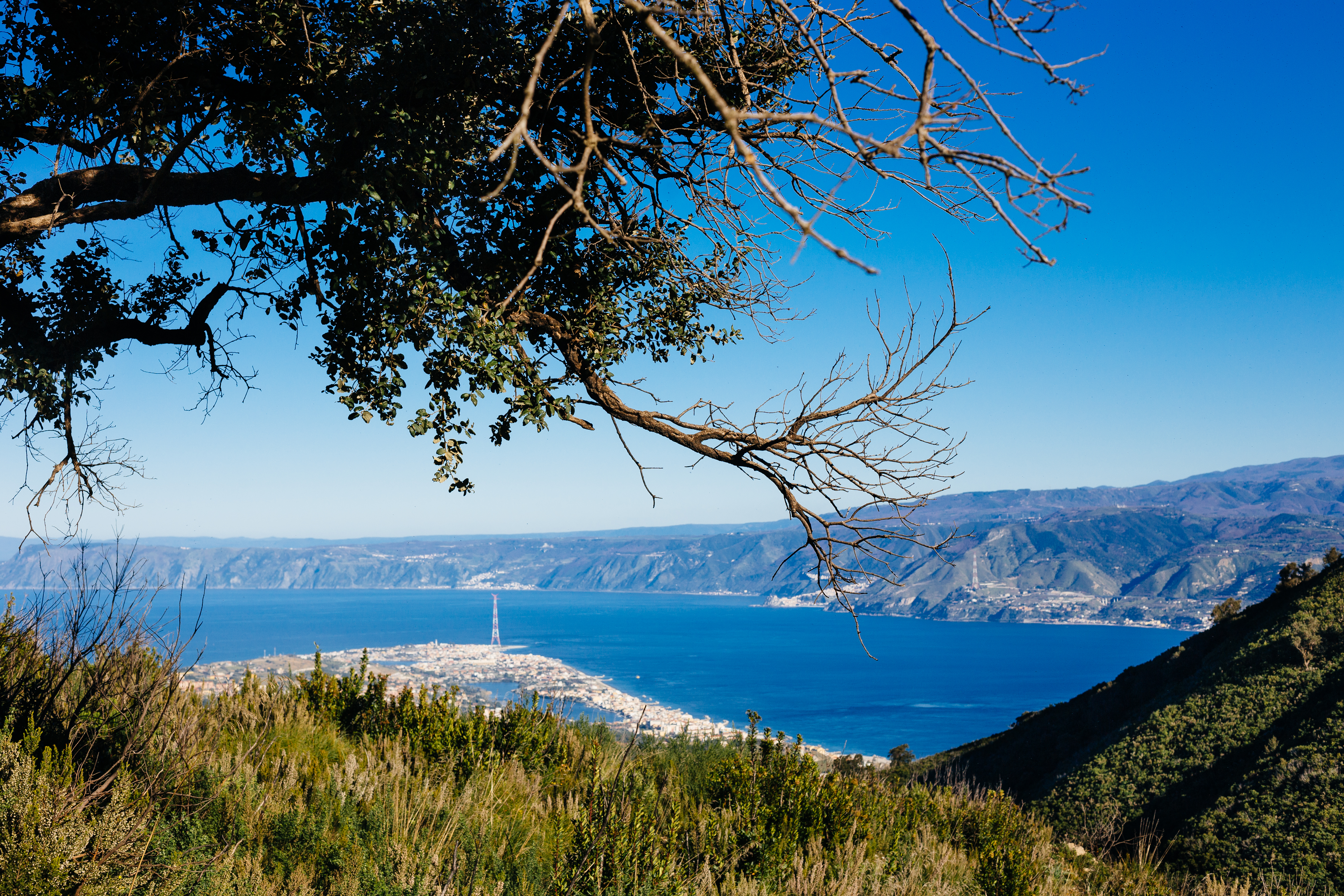
Aerial view

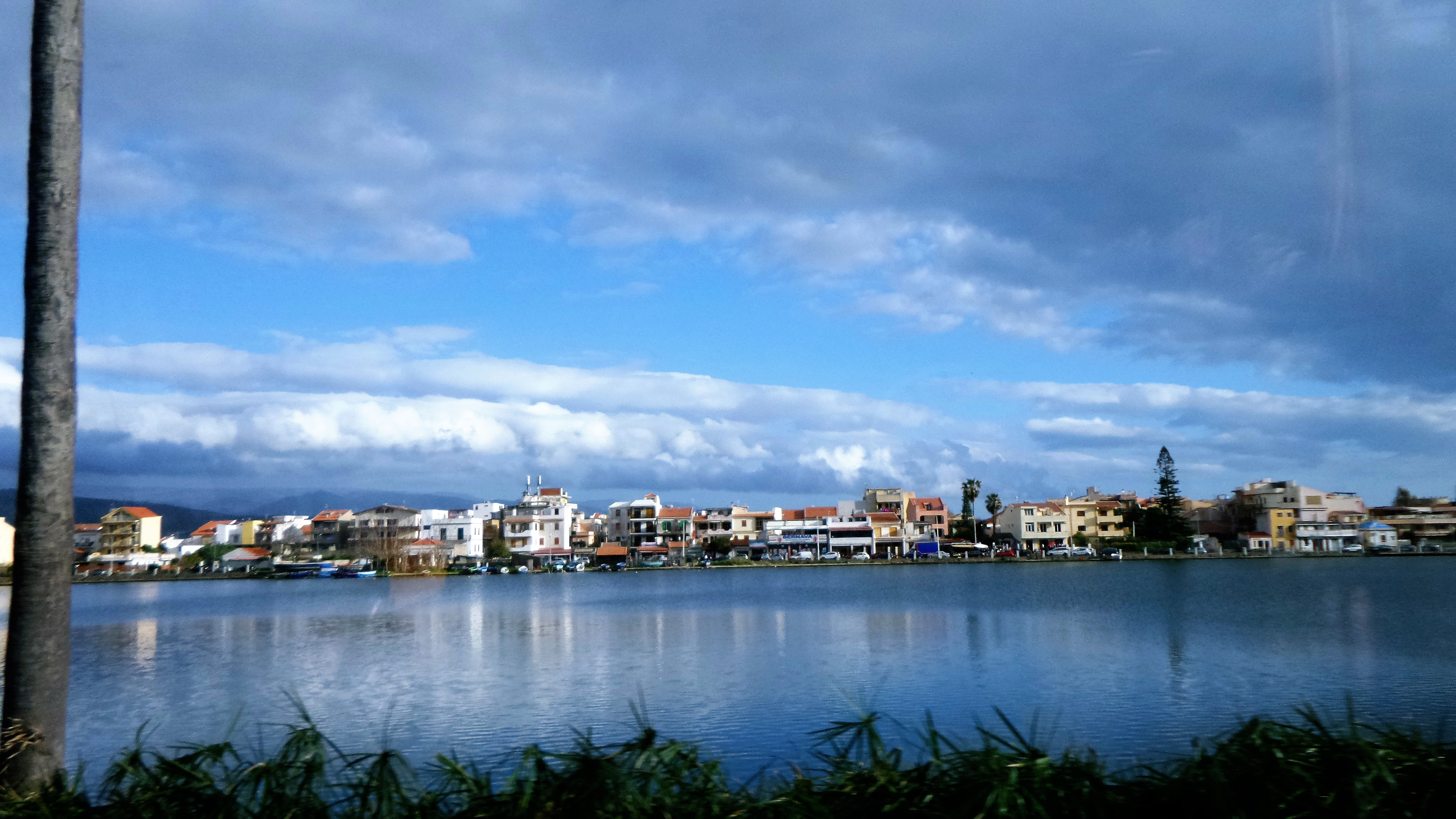
View 1

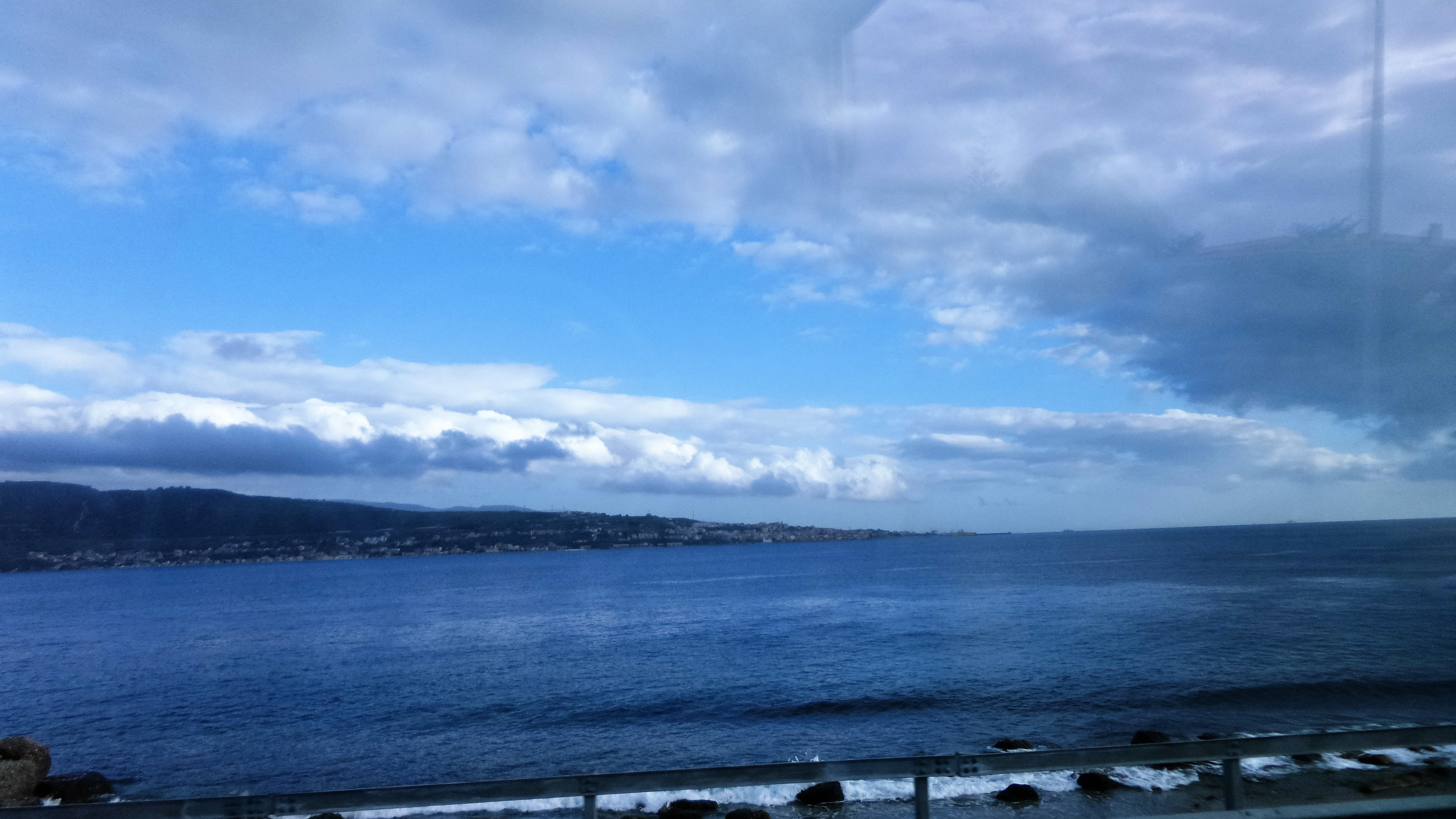
View 2

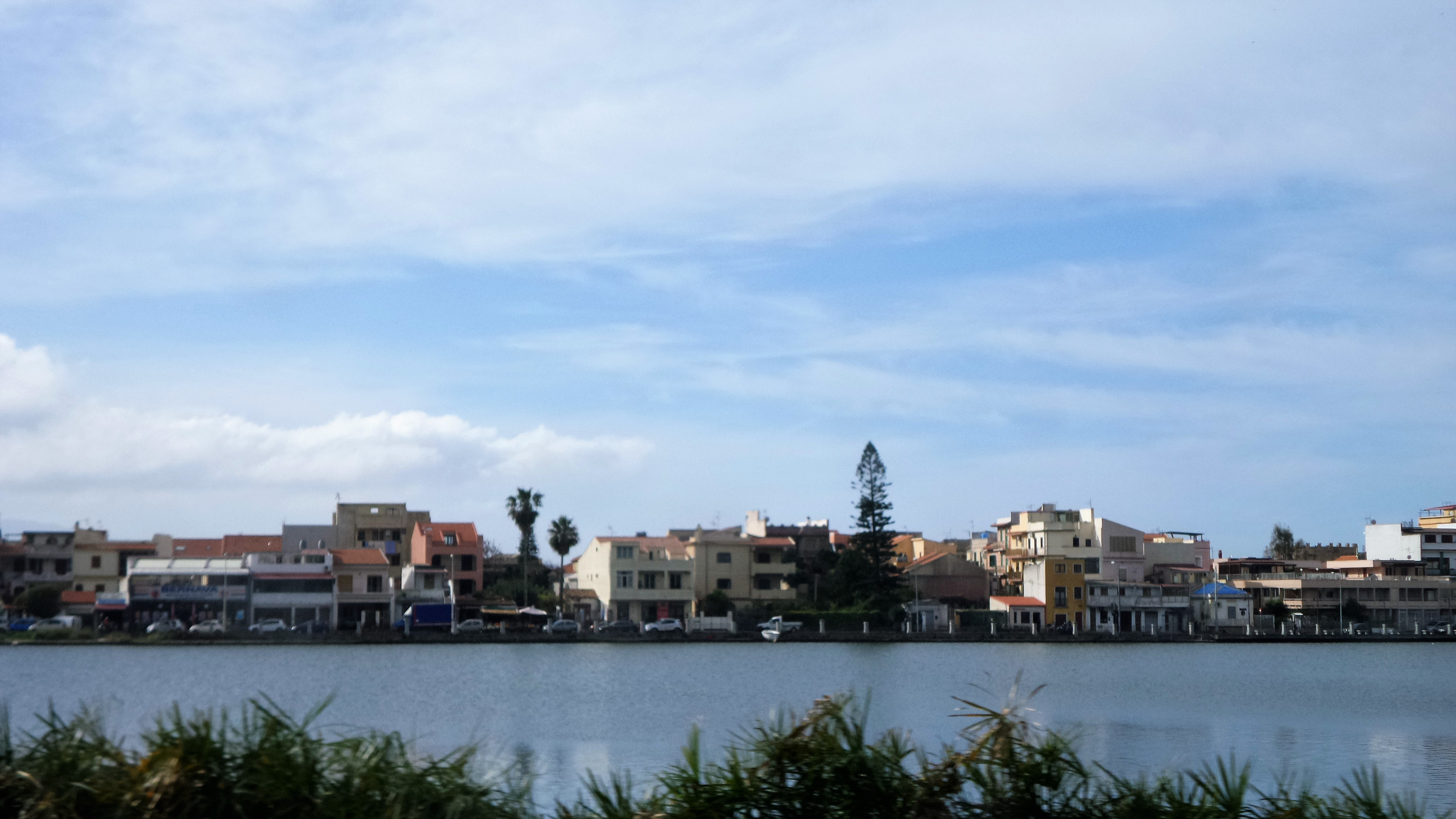
View 3

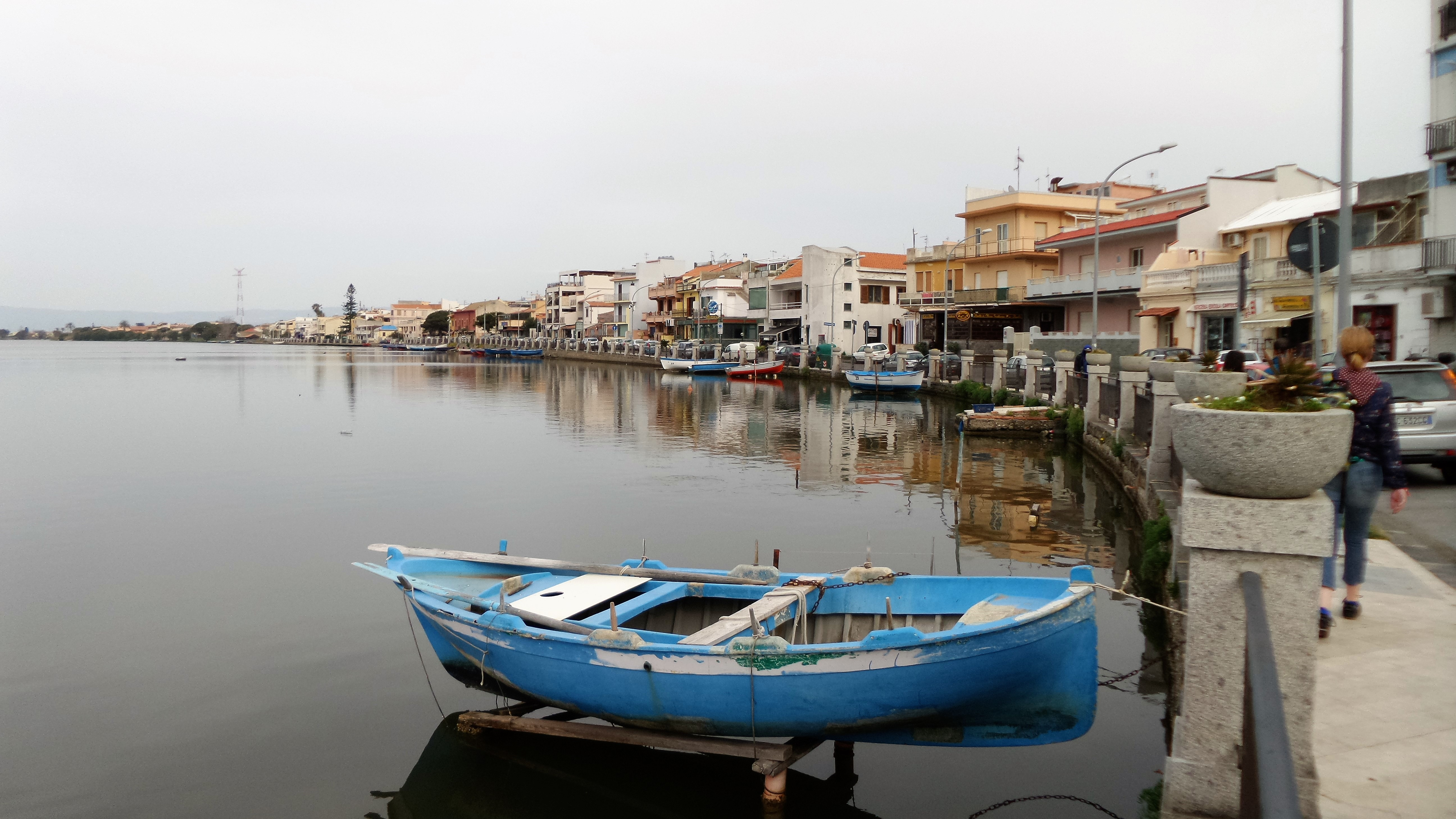
View 4

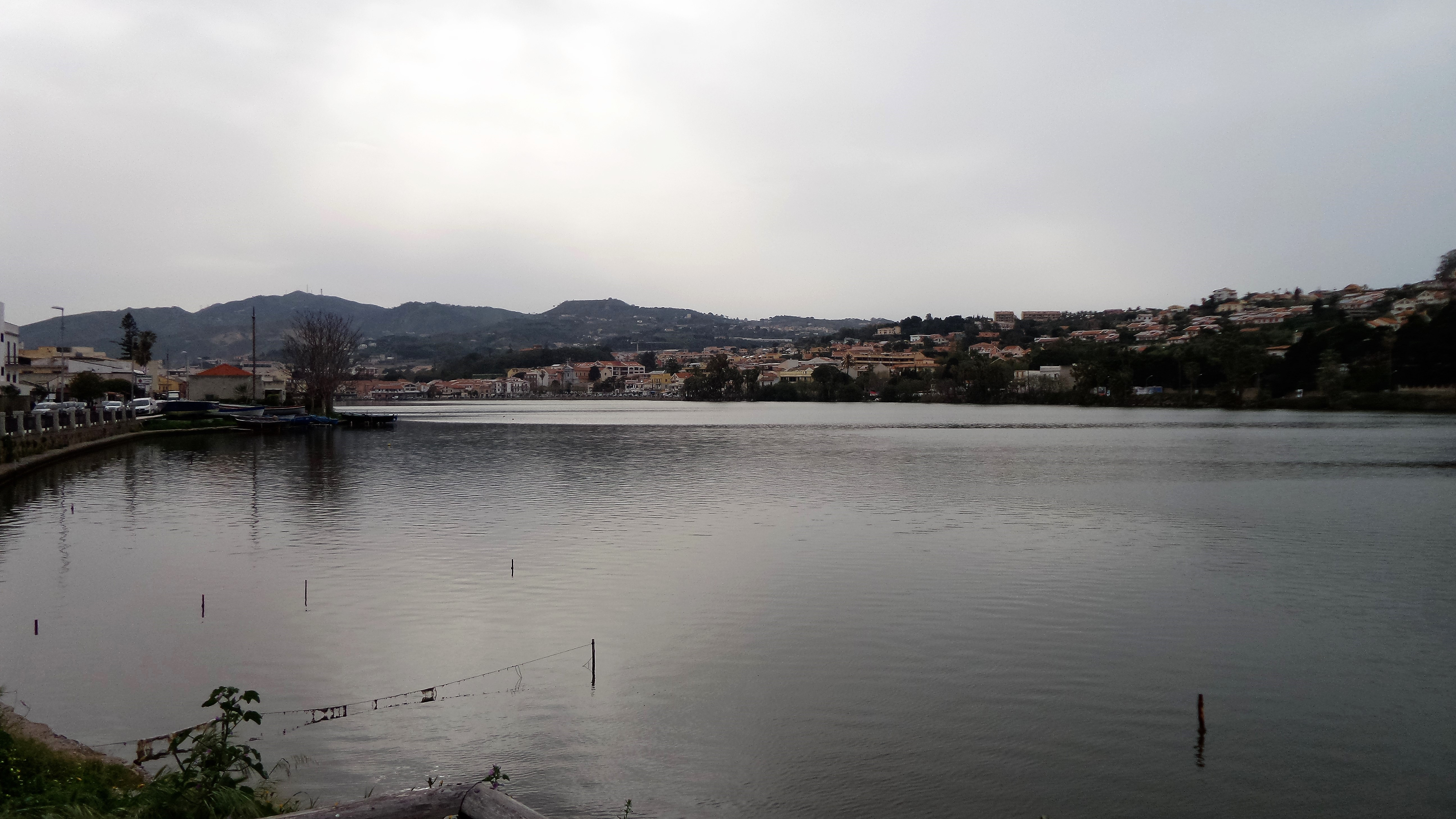
View 5

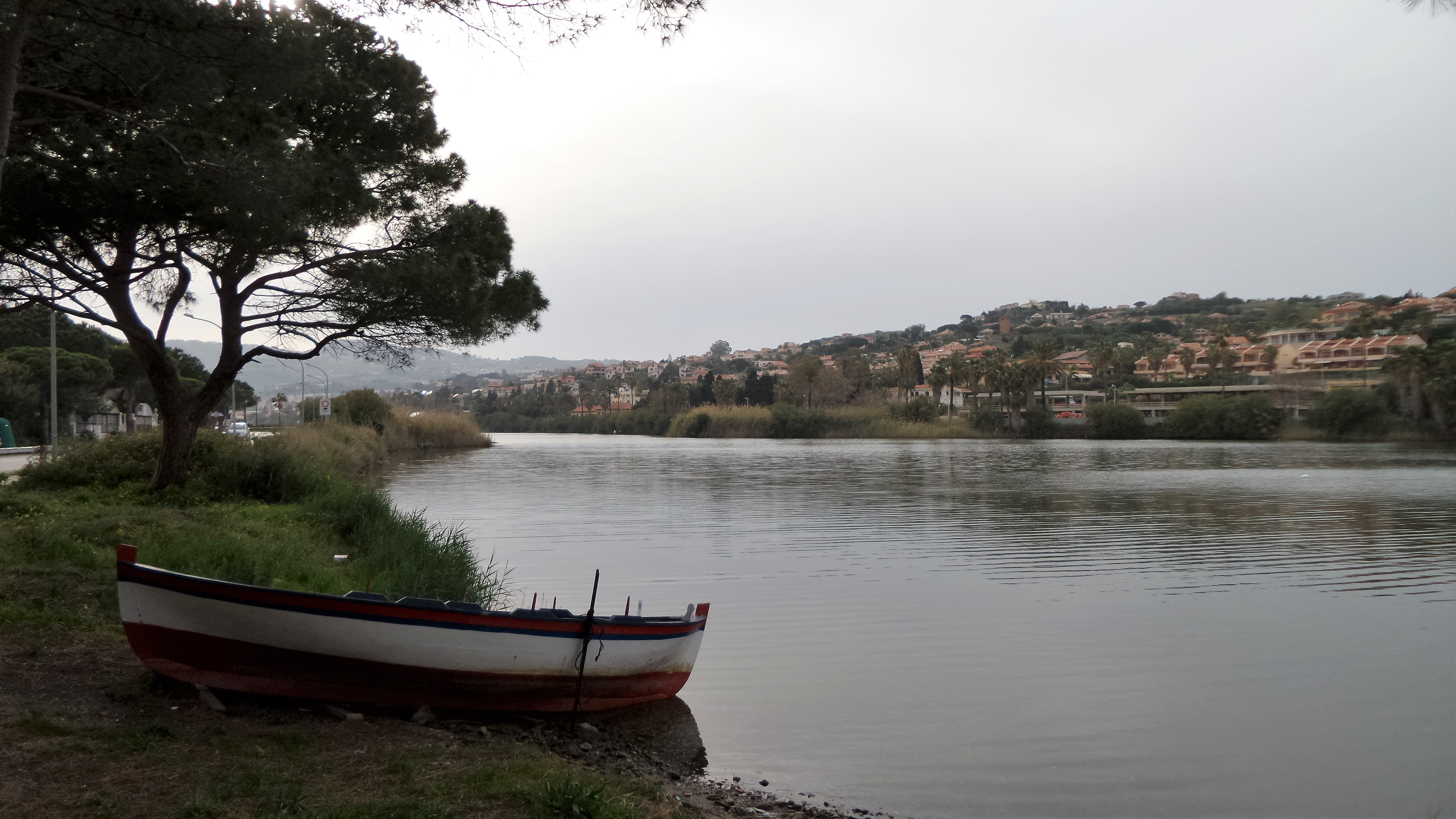
View 6

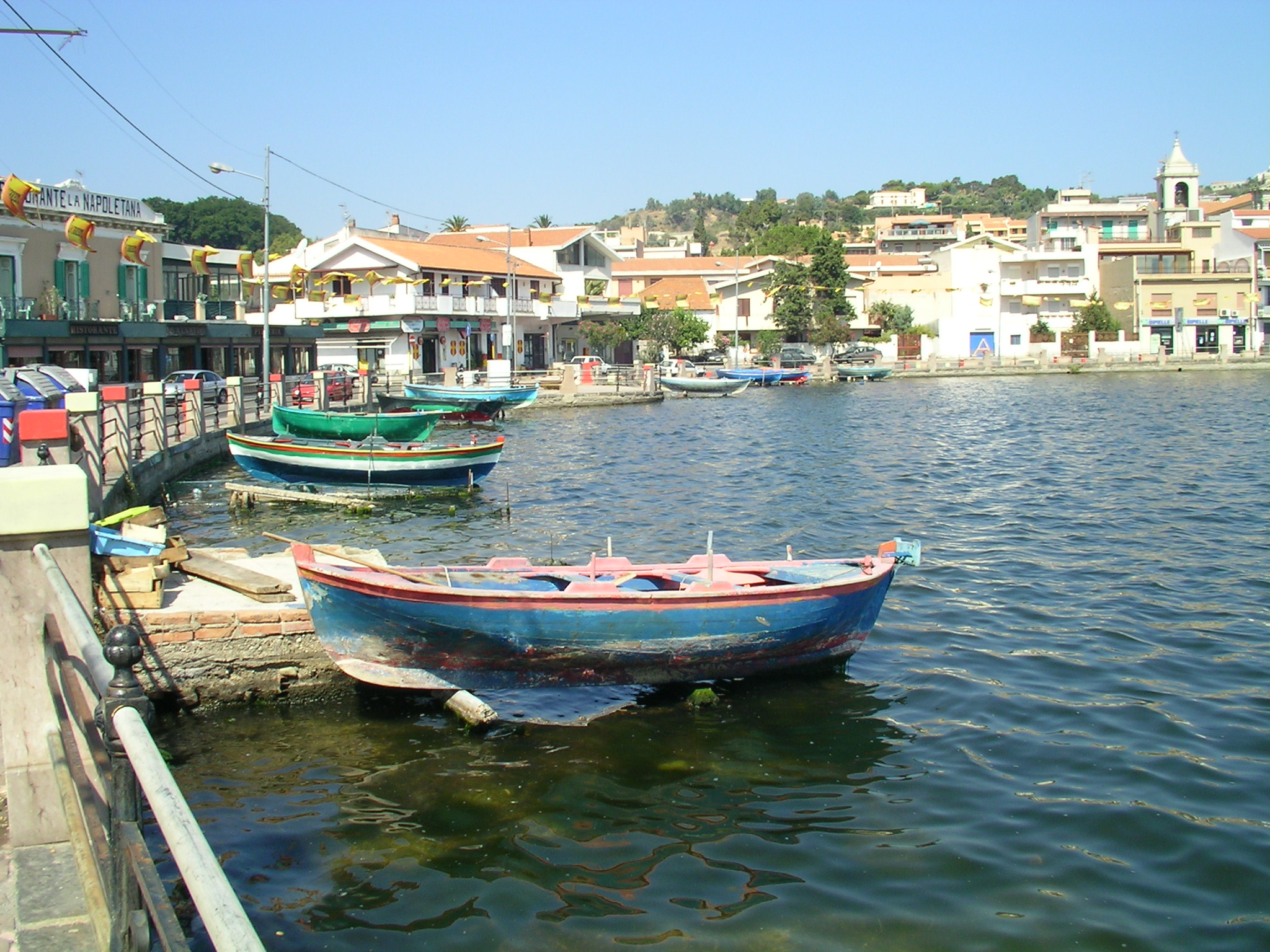
View 7

== See also ==
- 10 Hours of Messina
- Messina Grand Prix
