= Donatus =

The masculine given name Donatus can refer to the following people:

== People ==
- One of several saints named Donatus
- Aelius Donatus, a Roman grammarian and teacher of rhetoric
- Donatus Magnus, a 4th-century bishop of Carthage and leader of the Donatist sect of Christianity
- Donatus (d. 412), a representative of the Huns, possibly their king or just an ambassador; or a Roman living among the Huns
- Donatus (5th century), a monk who left Roman Africa during one of the Vandal persecutions and established monastic life in Valencia, Spain
- Donatus (bishop of Killala), fl. 1244
- Tiberius Claudius Donatus, a Roman grammarian known for his commentary on the Aeneid

== Places ==
- St. Donatus, Iowa, a community in the United States
- Saint Donatus Catholic Church, a parish of the Roman Catholic Church located in St. Donatus, Iowa

== See also ==
- Donato (disambiguation)
- San Donato (disambiguation)
