= Miggiano–Specchia–Montesano railway station =

Italian railway station

Miggiano–Specchia–Montesano

General information
- Location: Miggiano, Province of Lecce, Apulia; Italy
- Coordinates: 39°57′51.94″N 18°19′23.58″E
- Owner: Rete Ferroviaria Italiana
- Operator: Ferrovie del Sud Est
- Line: Maglie–Gagliano del Capo railway
- Platforms: 1

History
- Opened: 1910
Location
- Location within Apulia Location within Southern Italy Location within Italy

The Miggiano–Specchia–Montesano railway station is a railway station in Miggiano, Italy, built to serve the towns of Miggiano, Specchia and Montesano Salentino.

== Location ==
The station is located on the Maglie-Gagliano del Capo railway.

The train services are operated by Ferrovie del Sud Est.

== Train services ==
The station is served by the following service:

- Local services (Treno regionale) Zollino - Maglie - Tricase - Gagliano
