= Donato (surname) =

Donato is an Italian given name and surname. Notable people with the surname include:

- Andy Donato (born 1937), editorial cartoonist for the Toronto Sun
- Baldassare Donato (1525–1603), Italian composer of the Venetian school
- Daniel Donato, graduate student whose research was at the center of the 2006 Biscuit Fire publication controversy
- Dick Donato (born 1963), American television personality and winner of Big Brother 8
- Eugenio Donato (1937–1983), Armenian-Italian deconstructionist and literary critic
- Fiorenza Donato (born 1971), Italian physicist
- James Donato (born 1960), judge of the U.S. District Court for the Northern District of California
- João Donato (1934–2023), a Brazilian jazz and bossa nova pianist
- Magda Donato (1898–1966), Spanish-Mexican writer and actress
- Marc Donato (born 1989), Canadian actor
- Pietro di Donato (1911–1992), American writer and bricklayer
- Pietro Donato (1380–1447), a Renaissance humanist and the Bishop of Padua (from 1428)
- Rosa Donato (1808–1867), Italian revolutionary from Sicily
- Ryan Donato (born 1996), NHL player
- Ted Donato (born 1969), retired NHL player

== See also ==
- Donato (disambiguation)
