= Donato =

Donato may refer to:

== People ==
- Donato (surname)

=== As a given name ===
- Donato Bilancia (1951–2020), Italian serial killer
- Donato Bramante (1444–1514), Italian architect
- Donato da Cascia (fl. c. 1350 – 1370), Italian composer of trecento madrigals
- Donato di Niccolò di Betto Bardi (1386–1466), Italian sculptor
- Donato Gama da Silva (born 1962), Brazilian-Spanish footballer
- Donato Giancola (born 1967), American illustration artist
- Donato Guerra (1832–1876), leader of the Mexican Army during the time of La Reforma
- Donato Ogliari (born 1956), Italian monk and priest
- Donato Zampini (1926–2007), Italian racing cyclist

== Places ==
- Donato, Piedmont, a comune in the Province of Biella, Italy
- Donato Guerra, State of Mexico, a town and municipality in Mexico
- San Donato di Ninea, a town and comune in the province of Cosenza in the Calabria region of southern Italy

== Companies ==
- Donatos Pizza, American pizza company

== See also ==
- Donatus (disambiguation)
- San Donato (disambiguation)
