= San Donato =

San Donato is the Spanish and Italian form of Saint Donatus. It can refer to:

== People ==
- Saint Donatus of Arezzo (died 362)
- Saint Donatus of Fiesole (9th century)
- Dukedom of San Donato, noble title

== Places ==
- San Donato di Lecce
- San Donato di Ninea
- San Donato Milanese
- San Donato Val di Comino
- San Donato, Orbetello
- San Donato, San Gimignano
- San Donato, San Miniato
- San Donato, Santa Maria a Monte
- San Donato in Poggio, a village near Tavarnelle Val di Pesa

== Churches ==
- Church of Santa Maria e San Donato
- San Donato (Genoa)
- San Donato, Siena

== Other ==
- San Donato (Milan Metro)
- Villa San Donato
- Bologna San Donato railway test circuit
