= Januaria (disambiguation) =

Januária is a municipality in northern Minas Gerais state, Brazil.

Januaria can also refer to:

- Januária, Princess Imperial of Brazil, a Brazilian princess and Portuguese infanta
- Januaria (plant), a monotypic genus of Brazilian plants in family Rubiaceae
- Saint Januaria, a martyr and companion of the African Saint Quirinus
