= Miggiano =

Miggiano Misciànu (Sicilian)
- Comune
- Comune di Miggiano
- Location within Italy Location within Apulia
- Coordinates: 39°58′N 18°19′E
- Country: Italy
- Region: Apulia
- Province: Lecce (LE)
- Frazioni: Montesano Salentino, Ruffano, Specchia, Tricase

Area
  - Total: 7 km^{2} (2.7 sq mi)
- Elevation: 107 m (351 ft)

Population (November 2008)
  - Total: 3,684
  - Density: 530/km^{2} (1,400/sq mi)
- Demonym: Miggianesi
- Time zone: UTC+1 (CET)
  - Summer (DST): UTC+2 (CEST)
- Postal code: 73035
- Dialing code: 0833
- ISTAT code: 075046
- Patron saint: San Vincenzo di Saragozza, Santa Marina (Marino), Madonna del Carmine, Santa Barbara
- Saint day: 22 January
- Website: Official website

Miggiano (Salentino: Misciànu [mɪʃˈʃaːnʊ]) is an Italian city of 3,702 inhabitants in the province of Lecce in Apulia. Located in the lower Salento, a few kilometres from the Adriatic coast, it lies 50 kilometres (31 mi) from the chief town and 22 kilometres (14 mi) from Santa Maria di Leuca. Formerly considered a town, in 2003 Miggiano was elevated to the status of City.

The town or city of Miggiano, located in the central part of the Capo di Leuca at the foot of the Serre Salento, has a flat shape and is between 101 and 115 metres (331 and 377 ft) above sea level. The commune's surface geology is composed of Melissano limestone, formed in the Cretaceous. The karst terrain favours the creation of long underground rivers that feed the aquifers. The town, whose area covers about 7.64 square kilometres (2.95 mi^{2}), borders to the north Montesano Salentino, to the east Tricase, to the south Mirror, and to the west Ruffano.

== Climate ==
The weather station of reference is that of Santa Maria di Leuca . According to climate averages from 1971 to 2000, the temperature average of the coldest month, February, is 10 °C (50 °F), while the hottest month, August, is 25.3 °C (77.5 °F). The average includes zero frost days per year and 20 days with a maximum temperature greater than or equal to 30 °C (86 °F). The extremes of temperature recorded in the same 30 years are −2.8 °C (27.0 °F) in January 1979 and 39.6 °C (103.3 °F) in July 1988. The rainfall annual average stood at 563 millimetres (22.2 in), medium distributed in 61 rainy days, with minimum in summer and peak in autumn–winter. Climatic averages and maximum and minimum values from 1971–2000 have been published in the Atlas of Climate by Italy's Air Force Meteorological Service.

== History ==
The name of the village of Miggiano is mentioned in the literature for the first time in 1182, settlements and archaeological finds on the ground are anticipating the origins of the country in the period Messapian or Roman, or even to Bronze Age, which dates back to the standing stones and caves carved into the rock. The first settlement itself but is due to Middle Ages when people took refuge in the area from the coast and from there escaped following the barbarian invasions and Saracen. Later, in 1156, these people joined the people of the city of Large destroyed by William the Bad.

In 1190, in Norman, the fief of Miggiano was donated by the Count of Lecce Tancred on Filiberto Monteroni. There followed a succession of several noble families: the spirit, and Gallon Vernaleone. Heavily looted and destroyed in 1480 by the Turks, and four years later by the Venetians, the house underwent a drastic decline in population. In 1486 he was subject to the Church of Castro which he held the check until 1818 when it was deleted from the Diocese of Castro. He then went to the Bishop of Otranto until in 1866 it was forfeited to the Royal Property. Despite belonging to the Diocese of Castro before, and that of Otranto, after the ecclesiastical jurisdiction always belonged to the Diocese of Ugento.

== Name origins ==
The name may derive from the Latin meaning miscellaneous with mixing (of people), other assumptions lead back to the origin of etymology medianus word meaning "that lies somewhere in between." Most likely origin praedial from the Latin name of person Maedius. Over the centuries the name has thus evolved from Mesiano in Misiano, then mixed and Miggiano of Paduli in 1600 and finally Miggiano.

== Monuments and places of interest ==
=== Cathedral Church ===
The Cathedral Church is dedicated to St. Vincent Martyr, the patron of the country and the Diocese of Ugento . Its construction dates to the 16th century and has undergone many changes and additions over the centuries. In particular, the work on the 19th century acted in total reconstruction of the prospectus that shows architectural extremely essential. Consisting of three parts, of which the two sides are lightly covered, has three gateways surmounted by a niche with Baroque statues, almost certainly coming from the original facade. The interior consists of three naves with transept, in which open deep side chapels with its late Baroque altars. The area is home to a fine chancel choir and an altar adorned with a painting of St. Vincent, painted during the early seventeenth century from Nardò district Donato Antonio D'Orlando.

=== Crypt of Santa Marina ===
The Crypt of Santa Marina is situated in the homonymous chapel near the cemetery. This is a crypt Basilian dating to the 10th or 11th centuries and consists of three rooms: a room entrance, a central trapezoidal and the apse. Each environment presents the typical steps which act as seats and in the apse are the remains of an altar and a column. Of particular importance are the Byzantine frescoes depicting St. Nicholas, St. Catherine of Alexandria, the ' Archangel Gabriel, Santa Marina and Holy Anonymous, executed over a period of time between the 11th and 14th centuries . Particular importance is given by the representation of the Dormition of the Virgin, the Virgin's body lay surrounded by the Apostles . Above the figure of Christ holding the soul of Mother, rendered symbolically with a small figure wrapped in white bands. Around two bishops and a figure with a halo attend the scene.

=== Other religious architecture ===
Chiesa del Carmine - 17th century

== Civil architecture ==
=== Palace Vernaleone ===
The palace is one of the most important historic houses in the country. Built in the 17th century and the 18th century, it retains much of the original structure because of numerous rearrangements alternated over the centuries until the first half of the 20th century . The building, place a long time one of the entrances to the village, the home was the factor responsible for managing the revenues of ecclesiastical estates. The strategic locations allowed to supervise the farmers, returning from the fields, and to record and store the harvest. In the 18th century became the residence of the family Vernaleone, as administrators of justice in the area.

=== Palace Episcopo ===
The building lies within the limits of a great forest that once bordered the town. The first building of the structure seems to date the arrival of the Augustinians in the country, between the 16th and 17th centuries, which elected it to his home. Here, the men apparently worked the hemp and flax in large stone vats for the production of paper. With the passage of property to the families of Episcopo Poggiardo, the building assumed its present appearance. The facade consists of two floors with an elegant portal surmounted by a protome lion, and a large balcony resting on brackets work with fitoformi reasons (i.e. connected to the plant world). Some wreaths, carved in local stone, decorate the windows of the main floor. In the centre you can see the family crest. All around the building lies a lush garden with paths and pergolas.

== Dialect ==
The dialect spoken in Miggiano is the dialect of Salento in southern variant. The Salento dialect shows load influences attributable to the rulers and the people settled in those territories that have followed over the centuries: Messapi, Greeks, Romans, Byzantines, Lombards, Normans, Albanian, French, Spanish.
