= Calvera (disambiguation) =

Calvera is a city in the province of Potenza, southern Italy.

Calvera may also refer to:

- Calvera, a character from the film The Magnificent Seven, played by Eli Wallach
- Calvera (neutron star), an isolated neutron star located in the constellation of Ursa Minor, named after the character from The Magnificent Seven.
