= Duke of San Donato =

Noble title of Spain

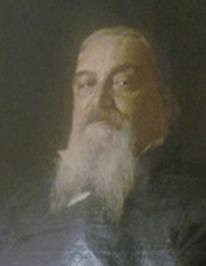
The 19th century Gennaro Sambiase Sanseverino, "Duke of San Donato" and Mayor of Naples, who held the ducal title by permission of his brother, Giuseppe, Prince of Bonifati. Sanseverino was politician and supporter of the Risorgimento and the most notable family member.

Duke or Duchess San Donato (Italian: Duca o Duchessa di San Donato) was a noble title, first created in 1602 by the Spanish King Philip III for the House of Sanseverino. The duchy was traditionally based on estates and territories held in San Donato di Ninea, Calabria. The first creation, however, lasted only 52 years. In 1668, the title was recreated for a wealthy merchant, Antonio Amitrano, who had some years earlier bought the feudal rights over the former dukes' territories. Descendants of the Ametrano family held the duchy, as one several titles, until it became extinct in the 1970s. There have been successive claims over the centuries by distant kinsmen of the first holders to claim the duchy; these remain unverified.

== Origin ==
The history of the Duchy of San Donato can be traced to 1374, when following the wedding of Margherita di Sangineto with Venceslao di Sanseverino, Count of Tricarico and Chiaromonte, as part of the bride's dowry, feudal and territorial rights over lands in the area of San Donato di Ninea, passed to Sanseverino family. The family continued to hold the estates until in 1510, when Bernardino Sanseverino, Prince of Bisignano, granted them to a distant relation, Francisco Sanseverino, Baron of Càlvera. This began the lineage of the Sanseverino barons, later to be the first dukes of San Donato. The Sanseverino name was to remain linked, albeit tentatively, with the duchy throughout its history. At the height of its glory throughout Genoa, Venice, Milan, Piacenza, Modena, Capua, Salerno and Naples the family held ten princely titles, twelve duchies, nine marquessates and forty members of the family held the title count.

== The 1st creation dukes of San Donato ==
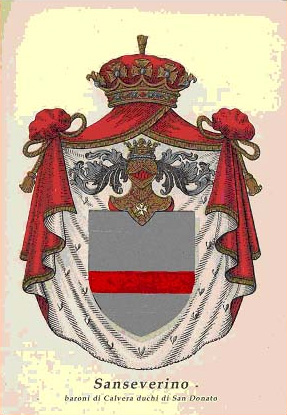
Arms of the Sanseverino family, who held the duchy for 52 years in the 17th century.

In 1598, the Baron of Càlvera were elevated, by the governing Spanish authorities, to the rank of Marquess of San Donato. This was to be a stepping stone to greater titles, for on 29 September 1602, Philip III of Spain created Scipione, 3rd Baron of Càlvera and 4th Baron of Policastrello, Duke of San Donato. Thus, establishing the duchy. This was a common ploy by the Spanish, for keeping the powerful nobility of the occupied country loyal to Spain, rather than as a reward for any great service on the part of the newly created duke.

Three years after the creation of the duchy, greater good fortune was to come to the new duke. In 1605, his mother, Lucrezia Carafa, inherited the estates of Roggiano from the Prince of Bisignano. From this time, the ducal court was now resident for much of the year at Roggiano, rather than San Donato. Scipione, Duke of San Donato died in 1640 and was succeeded to the title by his son, Francesco.

Francisco Sanseverino 2nd Duke of San Donato, was born in November 1611. As an aristocrat created by the Spanish, he was heavily involved in the Rebellion of Naples. The rebellion which had begun as a protest against the imposition of taxes place, by the Spanish authorities, on fruit, a staple food, has begun in Sicily and spread to Naples. The rebels principal targets were the tax collectors and the Spanish authorities, a body which included much of the Spanish created aristocracy. When the rebel's leader, Tommaso Aniello suddenly went mad in the middle of the revolt following a visit to the Governor's Palace, it was widely assumed he had been poisoned and the rebellion grew in animosity and spread beyond the city into the surrounding areas. In October 1647, following the failure of Spanish forces to reimpose their rule a republic was declared. However it was to be short lived; the aristocracy raised forces and maintained a blockade of Naples and the rebels, lacking the hoped for support of the French, were quelled and the Spanish were able to restore their authority. However, during the discord of 1647 the 2nd Duke of San Donato, regarded an enemies of the rebels, was murdered together with his daughters.

The Sanseverino line's tenure on the title was now fragile, the sole heiress to the title, Anna, had been injured in the attacks on her father, and aged nine years, she died in 1654 from her injuries. The title was now regarded as extinct and its associated rights reverted to the Royal Court of Naples, still controlled by the Spanish Habsburgs, presided over by Philip IV of Spain. The first creation of the duchy of San Donato had lasted just fifty-two years.

== The 2nd creation dukes of San Donato ==
Following the extinction of the sanserevino line, the title lay in abeyance. The ducal fiefs and territories which had reverted to the crown were sold to a wealthy merchant Antonio Ametrano, the son of a clerk in the royal household who had made his money in trade and from excises in Calabria. Ametrano paid the Neapolitan royal treasury 72,000 ducats for the fiefs and rights over the former duchy. The Ametrano family were unrelated to the previous holders of the Duchy of San Donato, but in 1668, the title and the lands were reunited when Amitrano was created 1st Duke of San Donato (of the 2nd creation) by Charles II of Spain.

Descendants of the Ametrano were to hold the duchy until their line became extinct in the 1970s. During the 300 years that the family held the title, the name of the ducal house changed when the duchy passed through the female line. As the family prospered and intermarried, it acquired further older and grander titles until the duchy of San Donato became a secondary title, often handed out for use to a younger son - while the head of the family and true holder of the title used the superior titles of Prince of Bonifati or Duke of Malvito.

== See also ==
- San Donato di Ninea
- Calvera
- Grotteria
- Policastrello
- Grottolella
- Oliveto Citra
- Bisignano
- Salerno
- House of Sanseverino
- Lustra Cilento
- Kings of Spain
- Princes of the Holy Roman Empire
- Kingdom of Naples
- Kingdom of the Two Sicilies

== Sources ==
- Elenco dei Titolati Italiani, Firenze, 2008, "Famiglia Lupis Macedonio Palermo di Santa Margherita", pp. 222–226 (on-line too).
- F. Capecelatro, "Diario contenente la storia delle cose avvenute nel Reame di Napoli negli anni 1647-1650. Ora per la prima volta messo a stampa sul manoscritto originale con l’aggiunta di varii documenti per la più parte inediti ed annotazioni del Marchese Angelo Granito". Napoli, 1850–1854.
- N. Cianci di Leo Sanseverino, Genealogia di Ercole Sanseverino, barone di Calvera, e suoi discendenti, Napoli 1902
- N. Cianci di Leo Sanseverino, Illustrazioni dell'albero genealogico della famiglia Cianci di Leo Sanseverino, Napoli 1906.
- N. Cianci di Leo Sanseverino, Nuove illustrazioni dell'albero genealogico della famiglia Cianci di Leo Sanseverino. Napoli, Morano, 1902.
- P. Guelfi Camajani, Dizionario Araldico, Milano, 1940 (reprint Hoepli, 1982) pag. 576
- M. Lupis M. P. di S. Margherita, Successione del titolo ducale di San Donato e Policastrello, in "Studi e Fonti Storiche della Società Genealogica Italiana", 2006–2008, on-line too
- B. Mazzilli, Cenni Storici su Calvera (ed. Dedalo libri), Bari, 1980.
- M. Pellicano Castagna I Sanseverino di San Donato, in "Studi Meridionali - Rivista trimestrale di studi sull'Italia Centromeridionale", Roma, Gennaio 1977, pag. 9
- A. Rivelli, Memorie storiche della città di Campagna, reprint Forni, Bologna, 2002
- G. Azzarà, I Sanseverino Conti di Potenza e di Saponara, in "Rivista trimestrale di studi sull'Italia Centromeridionale", Roma, 1975 - fascicolo III-IV.
- Atienza y Navajas, Julio de; Barón de Cobos de Belchite,Títulos nobiliarios concedidos por Monarcas españoles en Nápoles existentes en el archivo general de Simancas, in: "Nobiliario español, Diccionario heraldico de apellidos españoles y de títulos nobiliarios", Madrid 1954, pp. 1039–1043.
- F. von Lobstein, Note per una storia della Famiglia Lupis, in "Rivista Araldica", lug-sett.1986, pp. 129–134
- Rivista Nobiliare, Anno III, n. 1, pag. 6, 2008
- Fascicolo "Cianci di Leo Sanseverino", n. 1380, Archivio della ex Consulta Araldica del Regno d’Italia, Archivio Centrale dello Stato, Roma Eur
- Regia Udienza Provinciale di Catanzaro, Lettera S, fasc. 950, Anno 1762, in Arch. di Stato di Catanzaro, (in deposito temporaneo presso Arch. di Stato di Lamezia Terme)
- Archivio di Stato di Napoli, Real Camera di S. Chiara, Pretensori di cadetti (serie XXXV), vol. 52, inc. 70. "Supplica di don Orazio Sanseverino"
- Archivio privato dei Baroni del Mercato, "Fondo Pacelli - Sanseverino", Busta 18, fascicoli 1–14; Carte Pacelli, Sanseverino, de Leo, Campanino pervenute in famiglia a seguito del matrimonio tra Francesco Antonio del Mercato e Marianna Pacelli.
- Archivio di Stato di Salerno, "Fondo Notarile", Notai del Distretto di Campagna (SA), busta 680
