= Santa Maria a Monte =

- Comune
- Comune di Santa Maria a Monte
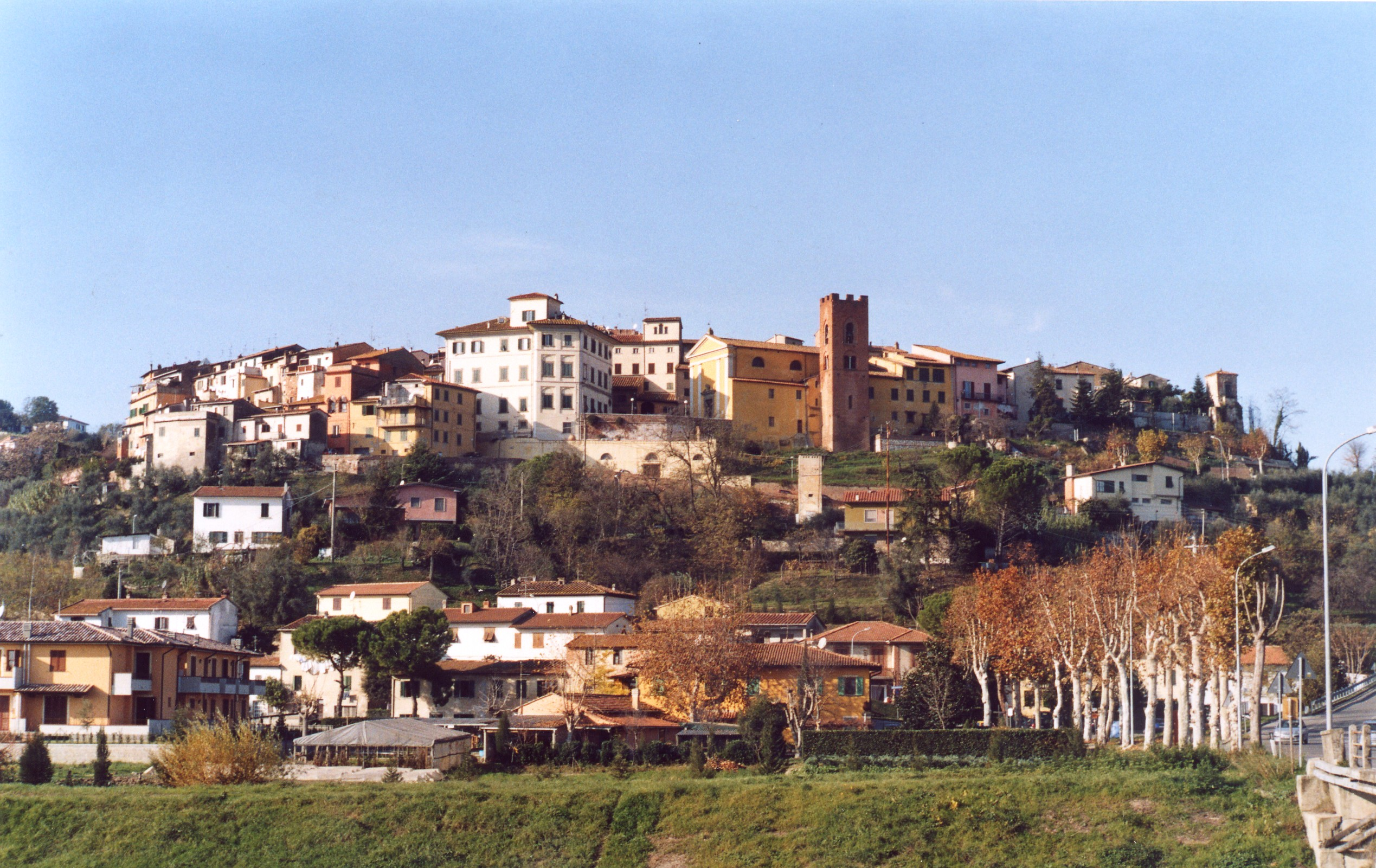

- Coat of arms

- Location within Italy Location within Tuscany
- Coordinates: 43°42′N 10°41′E
- Country: Italy
- Region: Tuscany
- Province: Pisa (PI)
- Frazioni: Cerretti, Cinque Case, Le Pianore, Montecalvoli, Ponticelli, San Donato, Tavolaia

Government
  - Mayor: Ilaria Parrella

Area
  - Total: 38 km^{2} (15 sq mi)
- Elevation: 56 m (184 ft)

Population (1 January 2016)
  - Total: 13,253
  - Density: 350/km^{2} (900/sq mi)
- Demonym: Santamariammontesi
- Time zone: UTC+1 (CET)
  - Summer (DST): UTC+2 (CEST)
- Postal code: 56020
- Dialing code: 0587
- Patron saint: Diana Giuntini
- Saint day: Easter Monday
- Website: Official website

Santa Maria a Monte is a comune in the Province of Pisa in the Italian region of Tuscany. The town lies about 45 kilometres (28 miles) west of Florence and about 25 kilometres (16 mi) east of Pisa.

== Geography ==
The main frazioni are the villages of Cerretti, Montecalvoli, San Donato and Tavolaia.

== History ==
Famous for its military strategic importance (the hilly position made it more defendable against enemy attacks), Santa Maria a Monte has always been disputed between several Tuscan cities. As a matter of fact, Santa Maria a Monte passed from the influence of Lucca under the influence of Florence and, in the end, it became part of the Pisa territory. A famous landmark is Casa Carducci, where the Italian poet Giosuè Carducci is said to have spent his childhood.

== Falorni ==
The località of Falorni has about 120 inhabitants (2005) and is about 80 metres (260 ft) above sea level. Around Falorni there is a large portion of woods and cultivated areas, especially with olives. The place is situated in the low woody hills called Cerbaie. The only business situated in the village is a restaurant.

== Sister cities ==
- Fontvieille, France, since 1991
- Tardajos, Spain
- Rabé de las Calzadas, Spain
