= Cerretti =

- Frazione
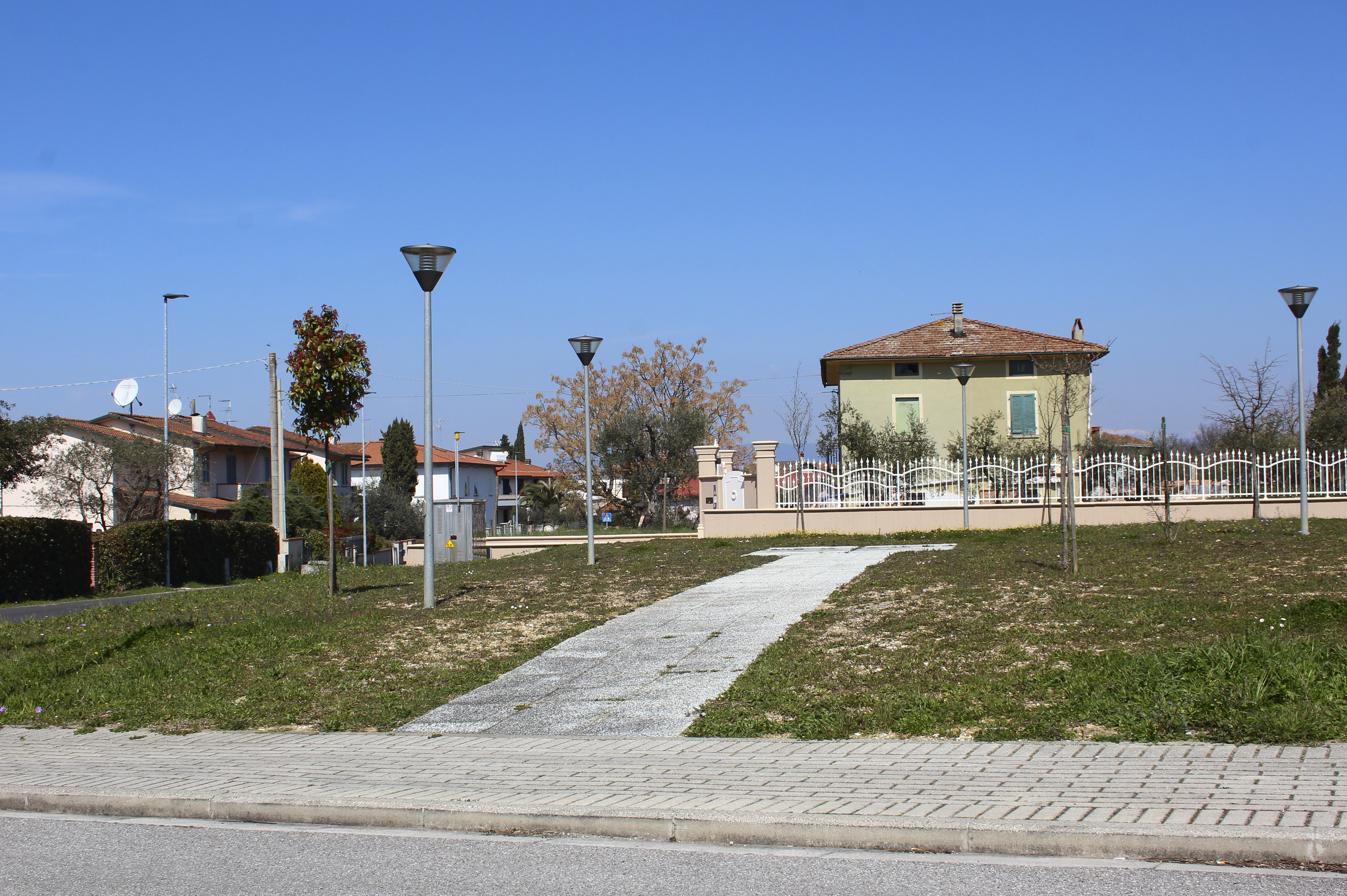

- Location of Cerretti in Italy
- Coordinates: 43°43′20″N 10°42′6″E
- Country: Italy
- Region: Tuscany
- Province: Pisa (PI)
- Comune: Santa Maria a Monte
- Elevation: 84 m (276 ft)

Population (2011)
  - Total: 658
- Demonym: Cerrettani
- Time zone: UTC+1 (CET)
  - Summer (DST): UTC+2 (CEST)
- Postal code: 56020
- Dialing code: (+39) 0587

Cerretti is a village in Tuscany, central Italy, administratively a frazione of the comune of Santa Maria a Monte, province of Pisa. At the time of the 2001 census its population was 488.

Cerretti is about 30 km from Pisa and 3 km from Santa Maria a Monte.
