= Montecalvoli =

- Frazione
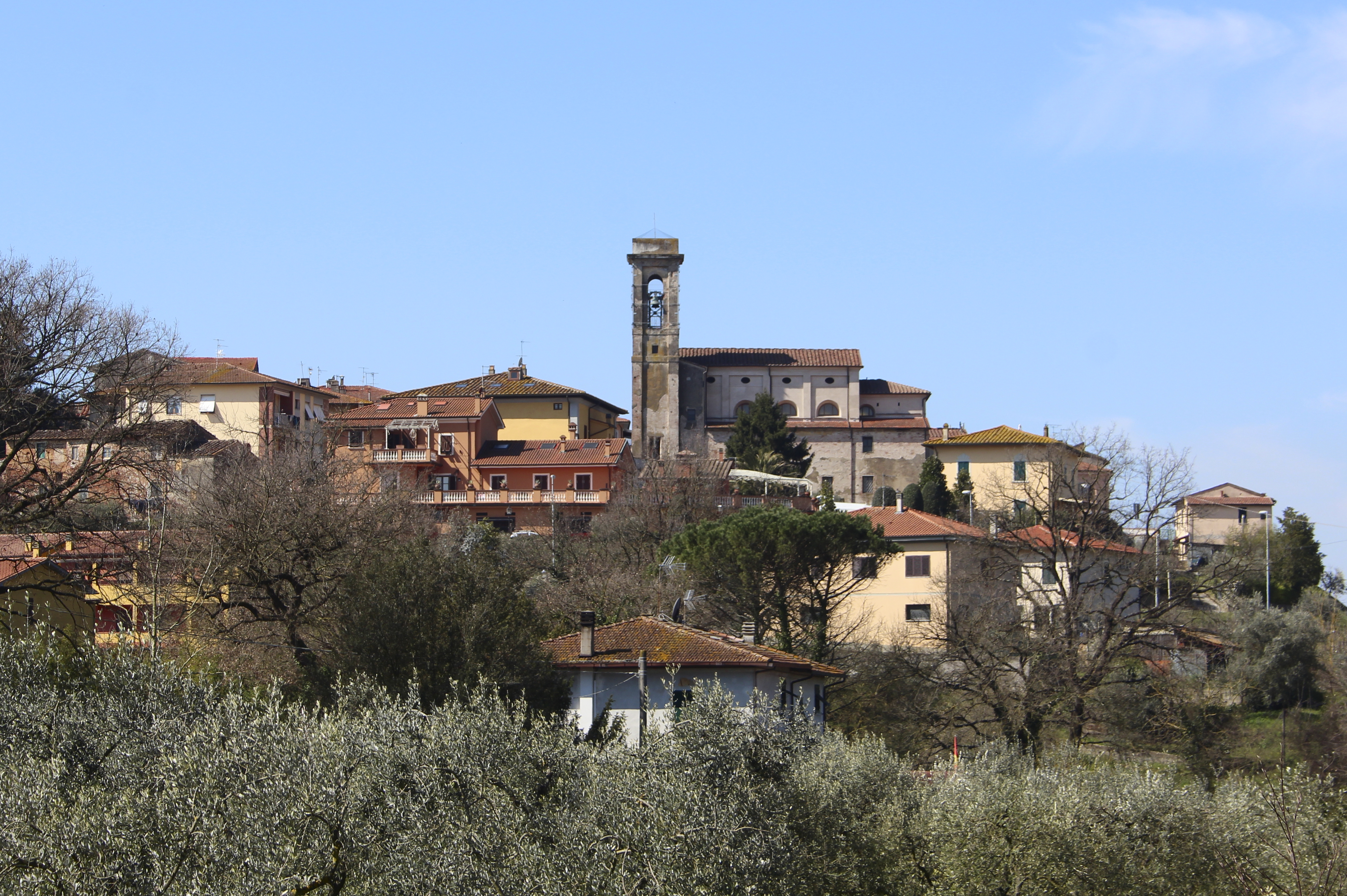

- Location of Montecalvoli in Italy
- Coordinates: 43°41′15″N 10°39′46″E
- Country: Italy
- Region: Tuscany
- Province: Pisa (PI)
- Comune: Santa Maria a Monte
- Elevation: 17 m (56 ft)

Population (2011)
  - Total: 3,171
- Demonym: Montecalvolesi
- Time zone: UTC+1 (CET)
  - Summer (DST): UTC+2 (CEST)
- Postal code: 56030
- Dialing code: (+39) 0587

Montecalvoli is a village in Tuscany, central Italy, administratively a frazione of the comune of Santa Maria a Monte, province of Pisa. At the time of the 2001 census its population was 2,632.

Montecalvoli is about 25 km from Pisa and 4 km from Santa Maria a Monte.
