= List of saints named Donatus =

Saints who were named Donatus include:

- Saint Donatus of Muenstereifel, 2nd century military martyr and a patron against lightning
- Saints Donatus, Romulus, Secundian, and 86 Companions, 3rd century
- Saint Donatus of Arezzo, bishop of Arezzo (?-362) (feast day: August 7)
- Saint Donatus of Thmuis, 4th-century martyr and successor of the also martyred St. Phileas as bishop of Thmuis, a city of Lower Egypt in the Roman province Augustamnica Prima, suffragan of Pelusium
- Saint Donatus of Euroea, otherwise Donatus of Buthrotum, bishop of Euroea (d. 387) (feast day: April 30)
- Saint Donatus of Orleans, hermit on Mount Jura, France (d. ca. 535, feast day August 19)
- Saint Donatus of Fiesole, an Irish monk who became bishop of Fiesole in 824 (feast day October 22)
- Saint Donatus of Zadar, Dalmatian bishop from early 9th century (feast day February 25).
- Saint Donatus, a Christian martyr of Sicily. See Saint Placidus (martyr).
- Saint Donatus, a companion of the African Saint Quirinus (feast day June 3).
- Saint Donatus of Libya
- Saint Donatus of Besançon, bishop of Besançon (7th century)
- Saint Donatus of Ripacandida, 12th-century Benedictine monk
