= Rodolphe Gasché =

Luxembourgian philosopher

Rodolphe Gasché (born 1938, Luxembourg) is a Luxembourgian-born American philosopher. He holds the Eugenio Donato Chair of Comparative Literature at the University at Buffalo, State University of New York.

== Career ==
Gasché obtained his doctorate from the Freie Universität Berlin, where he has also taught. Before going to Buffalo he taught at Johns Hopkins University.

== Work ==
Early in his career, Gasché translated major essays of Jacques Derrida into German. After moving from Paris to Baltimore to take up a post with Johns Hopkins University, Gasché was among a group of young intellectuals who authored pathbreaking articles in the journal "Glyph". The Tain of the Mirror (Cambridge, MA: 1986) located the thought of Derrida within the philosophical tradition (particularly of phenomenology).

== Bibliography ==
- Geophilosophy: On Gilles Deleuze and Felix Guattari's What Is Philosophy?, Evanston, IL.: Northwestern University Press, 2014, pp. 141.
- Georges Bataille: Phenomenology and Phantasmatology (Stanford: Stanford University Press, 2012).
- Imada Nai Sekai Wo Motomete: Heidegger, Derrida, Löwith, trans. Hiroki Yoshikuni, Tokyo: Getsuyosha Limited, 2012
- The Stelliferous Fold: Toward a Virtual Law of Literature's Self-Formation (Bronx, NY: Fordham University Press, 2011).
- Europe, Or The Infinite Task (Stanford: Stanford University Press, 2008).
- Views and Interviews: On "Deconstruction" in America (Aurora, Colorado: The Davies Group Publishers, 2007).
- The Honor of Thinking: Critique, Theory, Philosophy (Stanford: Stanford University Press, 2006).
- The Idea of Form: Rethinking Kant's Aesthetics (Stanford: Stanford University Press, 2003).
- Of Minimal Things: Studies on the Notion of Relation (Stanford: Stanford University Press, 1999).
- The Wild Card of Reading: On Paul de Man (Cambridge, Massachusetts, & London: Harvard University Press, 1998).
- Inventions of Difference: On Jacques Derrida (Cambridge, Massachusetts, & London: Harvard University Press, 1994).
- The Tain of the Mirror: Derrida and the Philosophy of Reflection (Cambridge, Massachusetts, & London: Harvard University Press, 1986).
- System und Metaphorik in der Philosophie von Georges Bataille (Bern: Lang, 1978).
- Die hybride Wissenschaft (Stuttgart: Metzler, 1973).

== See also ==
- List of deconstructionists
