= Donatus of Muenstereifel =

Saint Donatus
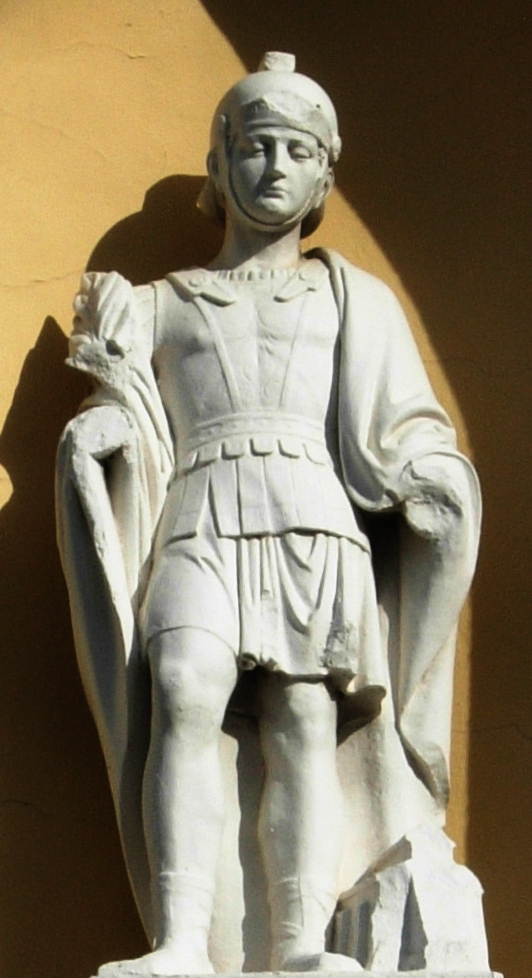
- Statue of Saint Donatus of Muenstereifel at the Kloster Maria Hilf (Bornheim)

Martyr
- Born: c. 140; Rome
- Died: 173?
- Venerated in: Roman Catholic Church, Eastern Orthodox Church
- Major shrine: Bad Münstereifel, Germany
- Feast: 7 August; 30 June
- Attributes: Roman armor; lightning bolt; martyr's palm; grapevine
- Patronage: lightning; fire; storms; bakers; Budapest;

Donatus of Muenstereifel is a catacomb saint whose relics are found in the Jesuit church in Bad Muenstereifel. He is widely venerated in the Rhine valley region of Germany and the Low Countries, and he is a patron saint of Buda and of protection against lightning. His relics were translated to Muenster Eifel in the 17th century from the Catacombs of Rome, where he had been originally buried.

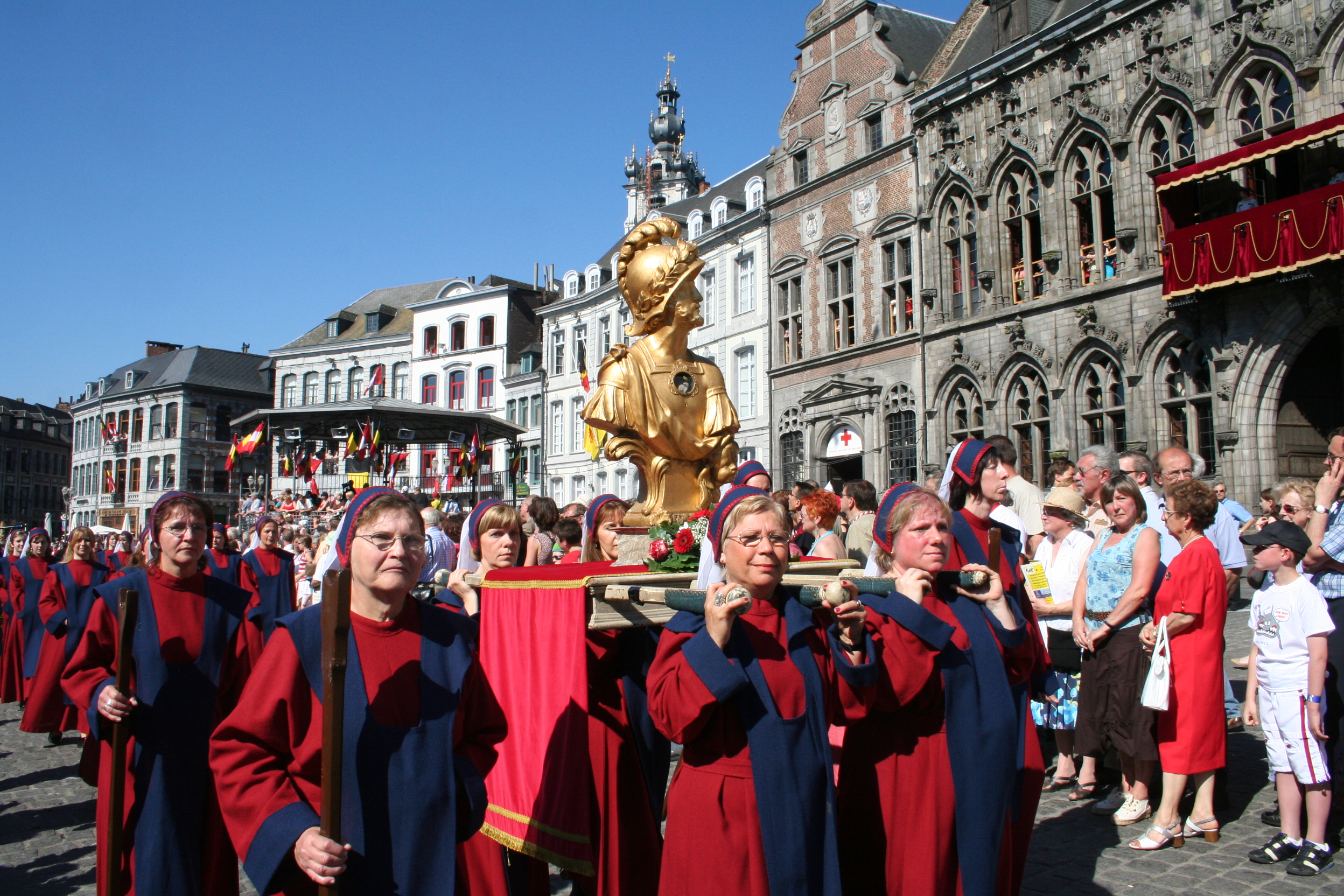
Brotherhood of Saint Donat, carrying the reliquary bust of the saint during the "Car d'Or" (Golden Chariot) procession in Mons.

== Legend ==
Saint Donatus is said to be a 2nd-century Roman soldier and martyr. His parents were named Faustus and Flaminia. When Faustus was deathly ill, his wife Flaminia sought the intercession of Saint Gervasius, who assured her that her husband would recover and beget a son. This came to pass, and Flaminia named the boy Donatus, which means "gift". She educated him in the Christian faith. At the age of 17, he enlisted in the famed 12th Legion "Fulminatrix", i.e., the "Thundering Legion". He rapidly rose through the ranks and soon became a personal bodyguard to the emperor, Marcus Aurelius.

In the year 173 the 12th Legion was engaged in the Marcomannic Wars in Moravia along the Danube frontier. According to the contemporary writer Dio Cassius, part of the legion was surrounded and nearly overwhelmed when it was miraculously saved by a divine thunderstorm. Cassius attributed the thunderstorm to the invocation of Mercurius by Aurelius' Egyptian sorcerer, Arnuphis, but Tertullian and other Christian writers ascribed the miracle to the prayers of the many Christians in that Legion. Later legend credited Donatus as the leader of the Christians' prayers. After the miracle, Donatus gave thanks to God, and he was martyred by the emperor.

He was buried by his mother in the Catacombs of Saint Agnes. Over the centuries, access to the catacombs was lost. In 1646, the catacombs were re-opened, and the relics of Donatus and many other saints were re-discovered. Pope Innocent X bequeathed Donatus's relics to the Jesuit church in Muenster Eifel, and they were carried in procession from Rome to the Rhineland. On 30 June 1652 the relics were at St. Martin's church in Euskirchen as a Jesuit priest, Fr. Heerde, was saying mass in the morning. With the conclusion of benediction, lightning struck the church and lit the altar and the priest on fire. He immediately invoked the aid of Saint Donatus and was miraculously restored unharmed. This miracle spread the fame of the Roman martyr throughout the region.

Some writers comment on the alliteration between the Latin name Donatus and the German title Donner, which means "Thunderer".

== Veneration ==
Saint Donatus is a patron against lightning strikes. His cultus is closely linked to that of Saint Florian, who is the protector against May frost. The two together are often invoked to protect the wine harvest, particularly in Hungary. Although he is not in the Roman Martyrology, he shares a feast day with his namesake, Saint Donatus of Arezzo, on 7 August. He is also commonly venerated on 30 June, the anniversary of his miracle in Euskirchen. There is an annual fair in his honor in Euskirchen on the 2nd Sunday of May. The Archdiocese of Cologne sponsors an annual pilgrimage to Bad Muenstereifel on the 2nd Sunday of July. In Hungary, where he has a widespread cult in the Balaton wine region, his protection for the vintage is asked on 7 August. He is depicted in art wearing Roman armor, and armed with a thunderbolt. He is often shown holding a martyr's palm or a grapevine.

=== Churches, Shrines, and Relics ===
- St. Donatus church in Bad Muenstereifel,
- Amberg, Aschach, Diocese of Regensburg
- St. Donatus Church in Brand, Aachen
- St. Donatus Chapel in Csobánc, Gyulakeszi, Hungary http://www.muemlekem.hu/muemlek?id=9883
- St. Donatus Chapel in Balatonlelle, Hungary https://www.panoramio.com/photo/109167118
- St. Donat vineyards in Csopak, Hungary
- Church of St. Donat in Carinthia
- Arsdorf, Rambrouch, Luxembourg
- Wormeldange, Luxembourg
- Beidweiler, Luxembourg
- Neimënster Abbey, Luxembourg City
- St. Michael, Bütgenbach, Belgium
- St. Martin, Euskirchen, Germany
- Wawern, Bitburg-Prüm, Germany
- Oberthal, Saarland
- St. John in Baindt, Germany
- Saint Donatus Church in St. Donatus, Iowa, a Luxembourger settlement south of Dubuque, Iowa
- St. Donatus Catholic Church in Brooten, MN, named after the church in Dubuque, IA
- Donatuschurch ( Donatuskerk ), Leermens, The Netherlands
- St. Antonius church in Loosbroek has a painted stone statue of St. Donatus
- St. Donat Church, Arlon, Belgium
- St. Donatus, School, Merchtem Belgium
- St. Donatus Church, Mount Saint Donatus, northeastern Slovenia
- San Donato, Pioz (Guadalajara, Spain)

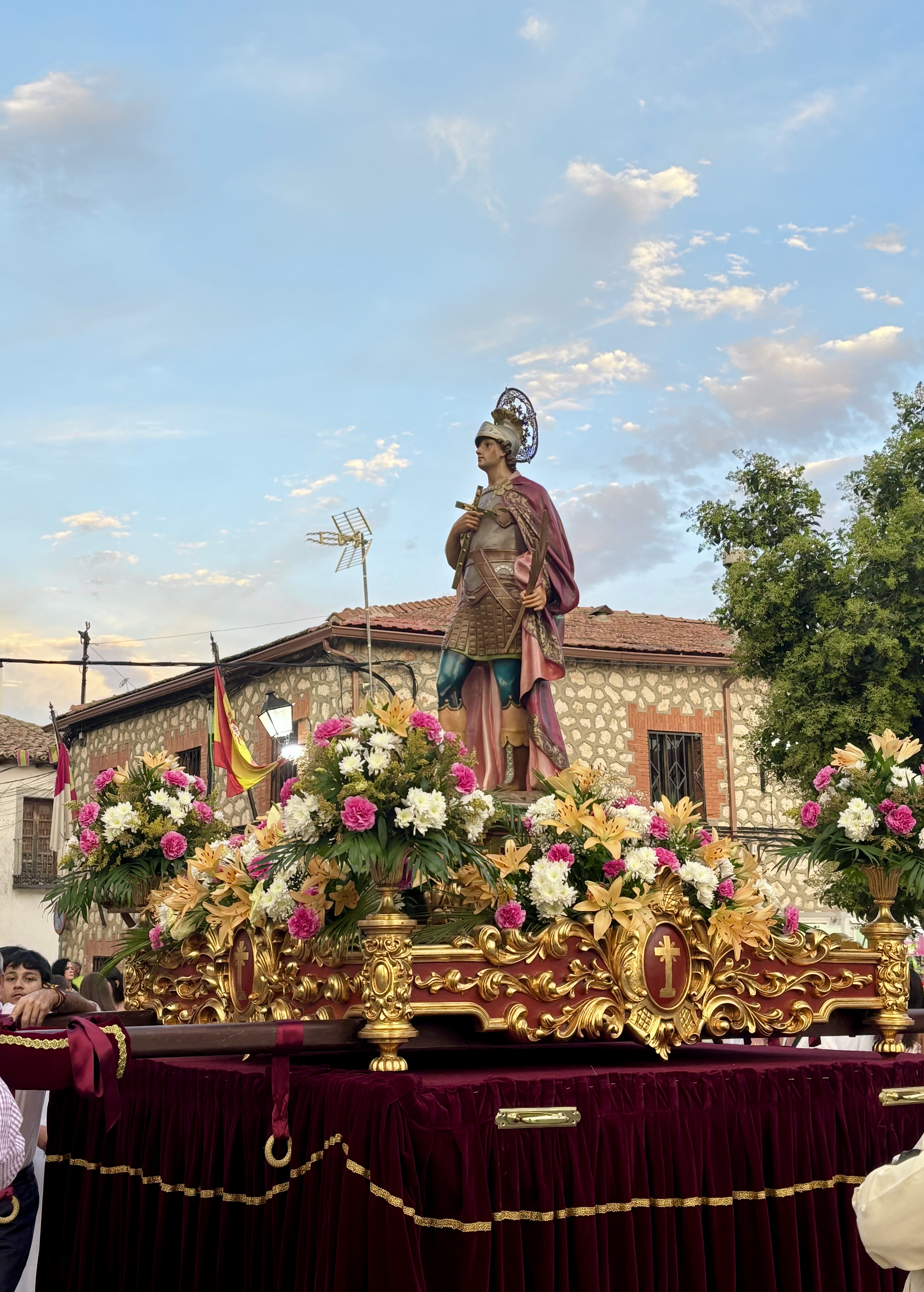
San Donato, Pioz (Guadalajara, Spain)
