= Rosa Donato =

Italian revolutionary (1808–1867)

- Donato portrait
- Born: Rosa Russo; 1808; Messina, Italy
- Died: 8 November 1867 (aged 58–59); Messina
- Occupation: Sicilian revolutionary

Rosa Donato (1808–1867) was an Italian revolutionary from Sicily who became a folk hero in the revolution of 1848–1849 and became known as the “people's artilleryman”.

== Biography ==
Rosa Russo was born in Messina in 1808 to a cook. As a teenager, she witnessed troops from the ruling House of Bourbon repress the population in her home town and execute the "first martyrs of freedom" who had taken part in the Sicilian revolution of 1820–1821. She married a stableman, Gaetano Donato, and took his surname but was widowed at an early age. She earned a living by doing menial jobs.

=== Sicilian revolutionary ===
Donato loads the cannon while under Bourbon attack.

In 1848–1849, Rosa Donato actively participated in the Sicilian revolution against the Bourbon government, to demand freedom and autonomy. She was active first in Messina and then in Palermo, after the Bourbon reconquest of Messina. There, in particular, from January to September 1848, she was the instigator of numerous armed clashes with the Bourbon armed forces, earning her the title of "people's artilleryman". In the chronicles and illustrations of the time, she is shown loading a cannon in Piazza Duomo to fire on the royal troops.

On 29 January 1848, at the beginning of the revolution, Rosa Donato, dressed in men's clothing, managed to seize a small cannon from the Bourbon army, which she, along with Antonio Lanzetta, transported to Piazza Duomo to use against the Bourbon soldiers. They were forced to retreat and take refuge in the entrenched camp of Terranova (that same day Rosa "was seen shielding Lanzetta to save a precious life, since he was the only one at that time who knew how to handle a cannon"). On the first of February, "the artillerywoman" took part with "her" cannon in other clashes in the San Francesco neighborhood. In the following months, "she fired grapeshot into the streets against the common enemy, kept watch over her piece during the long, cold winter nights". She was promoted to "corporal" in the field and placed in command of a battery of six mortars.

In early September, Messina was ravaged by Bourbon soldiers who had landed in the southern area and bombarded the city from the sea by the ships of King Ferdinand II of the Two Sicilies. Donato took part in the city's last stand and set fire to a munitions chest, blowing up the soldiers who were about to conquer the Pizzillari neighborhood. She was badly injured in the blast, but by feigning death, she managed to escape. During the night, along with Lanzetta and other Messina revolutionaries, she left the city to continue fighting in Palermo, where the revolution was still raging. There she was given command of two artillery pieces, and she received a public commendation by the revolutionary government.

=== Post-revolution years ===
After the Bourbon reconquest of Palermo in May 1849, Donato returned to Messina, where she was arrested, tortured and imprisoned for 15 months in the dungeons of the Bourbon stronghold called the Citadel of Messina. Upon her release, she was impoverished and subsisted by begging in front of the University, but only from the young students in whom she placed her only hope for the future. After 1860, as a sign of gratitude for her active role in the 1848 revolution, she was granted a small but insufficient pension.

Gugliandolo sculpture of Donato along with an image of her cannon.

Rosa Donato died in poverty on 8 November 1867. At the end of the 19th century, on a plaque placed near Piazza Duomo, she was compared to two other women of Messina in 1282, Dina and Clarenza, by the poet Virgilio Saccà: "Dina and Clarenza, the heroines of the Vespers War, had in 1848, on this road and at the Pizzillari fort, a glorious rival, the people's artillerywoman, Rosa Donato."

A statue, created in 1893 by the sculptor Vincenzo Gugliandolo, shows her as "the people's artillerywoman" next to the barrel of "her" cannon. The sculpture is now preserved in the headquarters of the Banco di Sicilia-Unicredit.

=== Honors ===
A staircase in Messina was named in Donato's honor in 2021.
