= Januaria lombardii =

Scientific classification
- Kingdom: Plantae
- Clade: Tracheophytes
- Clade: Angiosperms
- Clade: Eudicots
- Clade: Asterids
- Order: Gentianales
- Family: Rubiaceae
- Genus: Januaria; R.M.Salas & Nuñez Florentin (2023)
- Species: J. lombardii

Binomial name
- Januaria lombardii R.M.Salas & Nuñez Florentin (2023)

Species of flowering plant

Januaria lombardii is a species of flowering plant in the family Rubiaceae. It is the sole species in genus Januaria. It a shrub endemic to northern Minas Gerais state in southeastern Brazil.
