= St. Donatus, Iowa =

- City
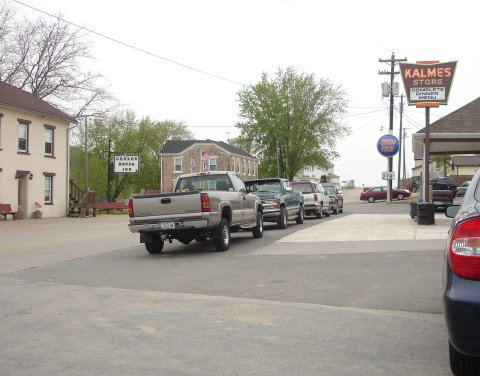
- Downtown Saint Donatus, Iowa

- Location of St. Donatus, Iowa
- Coordinates: 42°21′45″N 90°32′32″W
- Country: United States
- State: Iowa
- County: Jackson
- Incorporated: June 8, 1964

Area
  - Total: 0.37 sq mi (0.97 km^{2})
  - Land: 0.37 sq mi (0.97 km^{2})
  - Water: 0 sq mi (0.00 km^{2})
- Elevation: 676 ft (206 m)

Population (2020)
  - Total: 120
  - Density: 320.8/sq mi (123.88/km^{2})
- Time zone: UTC-6 (Central (CST))
  - Summer (DST): UTC-5 (CDT)
- ZIP code: 52031
- Area code: 563
- FIPS code: 19-69960
- GNIS feature ID: 2396484

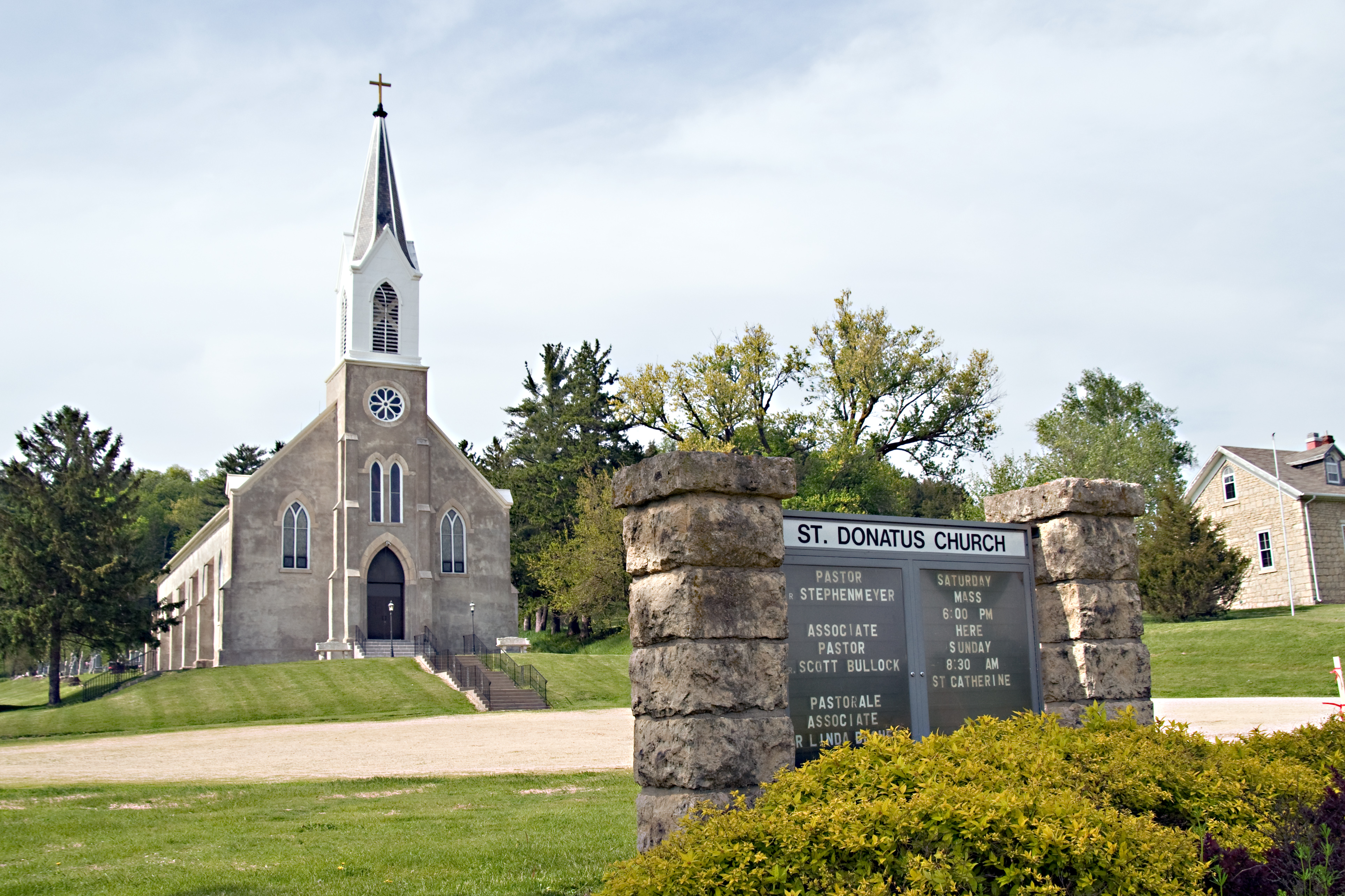
Saint Donatus Catholic Church

St. Donatus or Saint Donatus is a city in Jackson County, Iowa, United States. The population was 120 at the time of the 2020 census. St. Donatus is known for its status as a Luxembourgish village, with historic architecture and views along U.S. Route 52. It is the home of a historic Catholic church, which is dedicated to Saint Donatus of Muenstereifel, the town's namesake. It was formerly named Tete Des Morts, which is the name of a creek that flows through the village.

== Geography ==
According to the United States Census Bureau, the city has a total area of 0.37 square miles (0.96 km^{2}), all land.

== Demographics ==
Historical populations
Year	Pop.	±%
1970	164	—
1980	197	+20.1%
1990	145	−26.4%
2000	140	−3.4%
2010	135	−3.6%
2020	120	−11.1%
Source:"U.S. Census website". United States Census Bureau. and Iowa Data Center; Source: U.S. Decennial Census

=== 2020 census ===
As of the census of 2020, there were 120 people, 54 households, and 40 families residing in the city. The population density was 320.8 inhabitants per square mile (123.9/km^{2}). There were 62 housing units at an average density of 165.8 per square mile (64.0/km^{2}). The racial makeup of the city was 96.7% White, 0.0% Black or African American, 0.0% Native American, 0.0% Asian, 0.0% Pacific Islander, 0.0% from other races and 3.3% from two or more races. Hispanic or Latino persons of any race comprised 0.0% of the population.

Of the 54 households, 20.4% of which had children under the age of 18 living with them, 61.1% were married couples living together, 3.7% were cohabitating couples, 14.8% had a female householder with no spouse or partner present and 20.4% had a male householder with no spouse or partner present. 25.9% of all households were non-families. 24.1% of all households were made up of individuals, 11.1% had someone living alone who was 65 years old or older.

The median age in the city was 55.4 years. 10.8% of the residents were under the age of 20; 1.7% were between the ages of 20 and 24; 18.3% were from 25 and 44; 40.8% were from 45 and 64; and 28.3% were 65 years of age or older. The gender makeup of the city was 50.0% male and 50.0% female.

=== 2010 census ===
As of the census of 2010, there were 135 people, 54 households, and 39 families living in the city. The population density was 363.9 inhabitants per square mile (140.5/km^{2}). There were 57 housing units at an average density of 153.6 per square mile (59.3/km^{2}). The racial makeup of the city was 97.0% White, 2.2% from other races, and 0.7% from two or more races. Hispanic or Latino of any race were 3.0% of the population.

There were 54 households, of which 29.6% had children under the age of 18 living with them, 59.3% were married couples living together, 7.4% had a female householder with no husband present, 5.6% had a male householder with no wife present, and 27.8% were non-families. 22.2% of all households were made up of individuals, and 11.1% had someone living alone who was 65 years of age or older. The average household size was 2.50 and the average family size was 2.87.

The median age in the city was 44.3 years. 23.7% of residents were under the age of 18; 6.7% were between the ages of 18 and 24; 20.7% were from 25 to 44; 33.3% were from 45 to 64; and 15.6% were 65 years of age or older. The gender makeup of the city was 51.9% male and 48.1% female.

=== 2000 census ===
As of the census of 2000, there were 140 people, 53 households, and 41 families living in the city. The population density was 383.6 inhabitants per square mile (148.1/km^{2}). There were 53 housing units at an average density of 145.2 per square mile (56.1/km^{2}). The racial makeup of the city was 100.00% White.

There were 53 households, out of which 30.2% had children under the age of 18 living with them, 69.8% were married couples living together, 7.5% had a female householder with no husband present, and 20.8% were non-families. 18.9% of all households were made up of individuals, and 7.5% had someone living alone who was 65 years of age or older. The average household size was 2.64 and the average family size was 3.05.

In the city, the population was spread out, with 22.9% under the age of 18, 10.0% from 18 to 24, 27.9% from 25 to 44, 17.1% from 45 to 64, and 22.1% who were 65 years of age or older. The median age was 39 years. For every 100 females, there were 109.0 males. For every 100 females age 18 and over, there were 111.8 males.

The median income for a household in the city was $39,750, and the median income for a family was $42,000. Males had a median income of $32,083 versus $16,477 for females. The per capita income for the city was $15,369. There were none of the families and 0.7% of the population living below the poverty line, including no under eighteens and 5.3% of those over 64.

== Education ==
Dubuque Community School District operates local schools covering St. Donatus and areas to the north and west, while Bellevue Community School District operates local area schools covering areas to the southeast.
