= Arnouphis =

Arnouphis or Harnouphis was an Egyptian who, according to Dio Cassius, saved the Roman legion XII Fulminata during a campaign against the Quadi in about AD 172 by calling up a rainstorm. Dio Cassius calls Arnouphis a magos, originally a term for Zoroastrian priests. David Frankfurter says that Arnouphis was an Egyptian priest, but he was called a magos because Romans regarded priests from many Near Eastern cultures as fitting a single stereotype of exotic magicians.

== In popular culture ==
- In the series 20s A Difficult Age created by Marcus Orelias, the main protagonist, Harnuphis is named after Arnouphis.
