= Eugenio Donato =

Armenian-Italian deconstructionist and literary critic

Eugenio Donato (17 August 1937 – 19 September 1983) was an Armenian-Italian deconstructionist, literary critic, and "philosophical critic". Raised in Egypt, and educated in France, he played an important role in teaching Americans how to read post-structural theory.

He edited, with Richard A. Macksey, the book The Structuralist Controversy: The Languages of Criticism and the Sciences of Man.

Donato died on September 19, 1983, aged 46. His book The Script of Decadence: Essays on the Fictions of Flaubert and the Poetics of Romanticism was published posthumously by Oxford University Press in 1993. His archives are held at the University of California, Irvine.

== See also ==
- Rodolphe Gasché (he currently holds the Eugenio Donato Chair of Comparative Literature at the University at Buffalo)
- Jacques Derrida
- Critical theory
- Deconstruction
- Gustave Flaubert

== Sources ==
- Library of Congress
- Paris to the Moon (2000) Gopnik, Adam: Vintage Publishing ISBN 0-375-75823-2
