= Saint Donatus Catholic Church =

- St. Donatus Catholic Church
- U.S. National Register of Historic Places
- U.S. Historic district – Contributing property
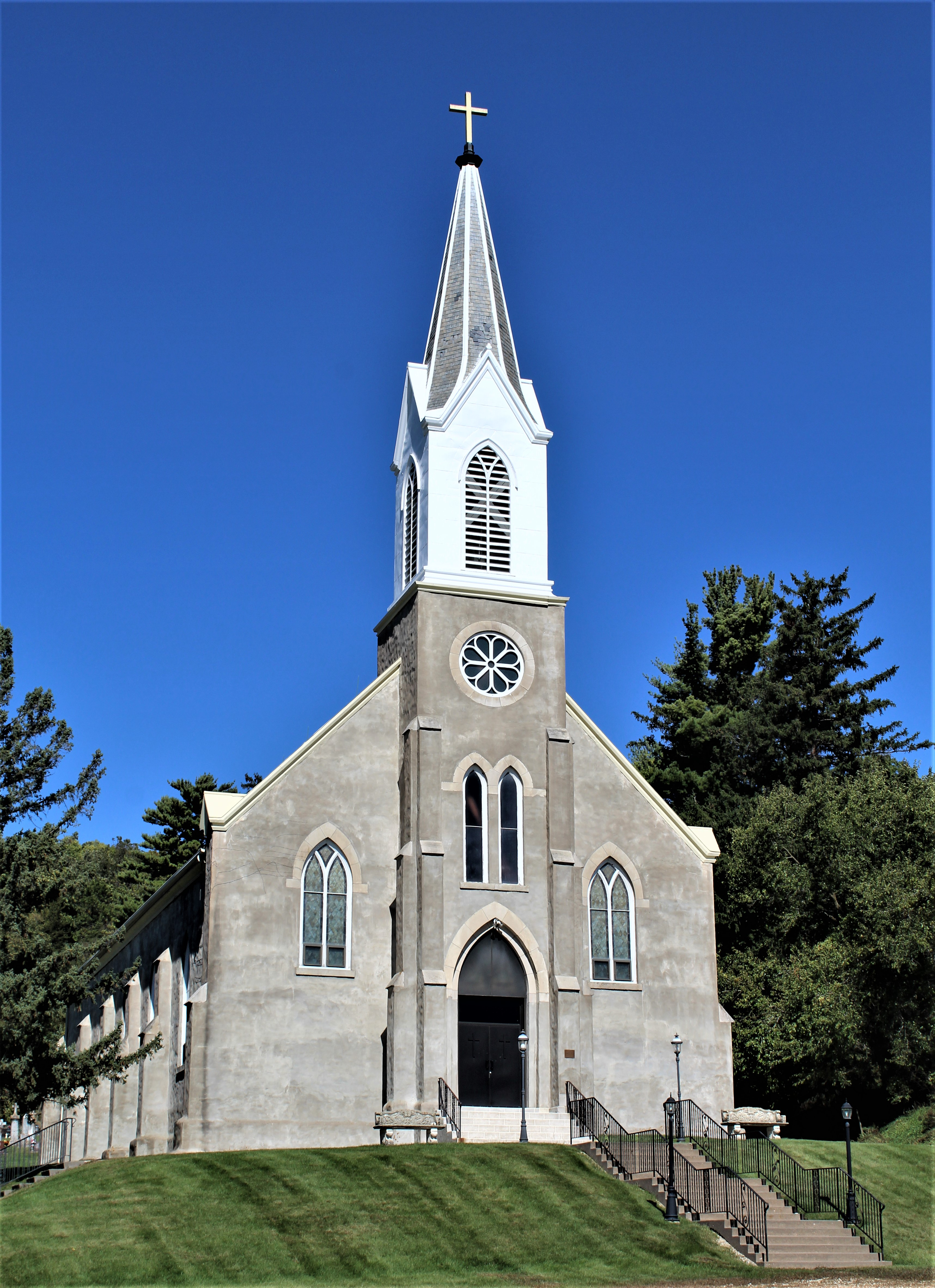
- The front of the St. Donatus Catholic Church

- Location within Iowa Location within the United States
- Location: High Bridge Rd. St. Donatus, Iowa
- Coordinates: 42°21′50.96″N 90°32′7.48″W
- Built: 1857 (rectory); 1885 (chapel); 1908 (church)
- Architectural style: Gothic Revival
- Part of: Village of St. Donatus Historic District
- NRHP reference No.: 89001870
- Added to NRHP: November 8, 1989

Saint Donatus Catholic Church is a parish of the Archdiocese of Dubuque located in the small city of St. Donatus, which is located in Jackson County, Iowa, United States. The patron of the parish and the town is Saint Donatus of Muenstereifel, whose cultus is popular in Luxembourg and the Rhineland. The parish complex includes a church building, rectory, chapel and cemetery. They are all contributing properties in the Village of St. Donatus Historic District, which was listed on the National Register of Historic Places in 1989.

== Description ==
The original church building, modeled after St. Boniface Church in New Vienna, was completed in 1858. It was destroyed in a fire on November 24, 1907. The exterior stone walls survived, and were used to build the present church. It was completed in 1908. The stone for the bell tower was quarried from the nearby bluffs. It is capped by a wooden steeple. There is little in the way of exterior ornamentation. The exterior stone walls have been covered with a coating of cement and lime. The parish cemetery is located behind the church. Some of the earlier graves are marked by elaborate iron crosses. Some of the early stone headstones were made in Dubuque, while others were created by 0. Wenzler of Milwaukee. The rectory, located next to the church, is a contemporary of the original church. It was built of stone that was quarried nearby and covered with light yellow/brown stucco. It is capped with a hip roof that features cross gabled dormer windows. The moderate pitch of the roof and the lack of eaves are typical of traditional Luxembourg architecture.

The parish is known for its outdoor Stations of the Cross located on the hill behind the church. They were constructed in 1861 under the direction of the Rev. J. Michael Flammang, and may be one of the first developed in the United States. Each of the fourteen stations are 5 by 5 feet (1.5 by 1.5 m), and are placed in open, arched entrances and gabled roofs. They are spaced at intervals of about 250 feet (76 m) along a dirt footpath that winds its way to the top of the bluff and the Pieta Chapel. During Holy Week the church sponsors a procession through the outdoor stations to the small chapel at the top of this hill. The chapel is modeled after the Chapel du Bildchen near Vianden, Luxembourg. The simple cut-stone structure was completed in 1885. The exterior stone has been left bare, and has little ornamentation. A simple wooden bell tower is located above the front gable.

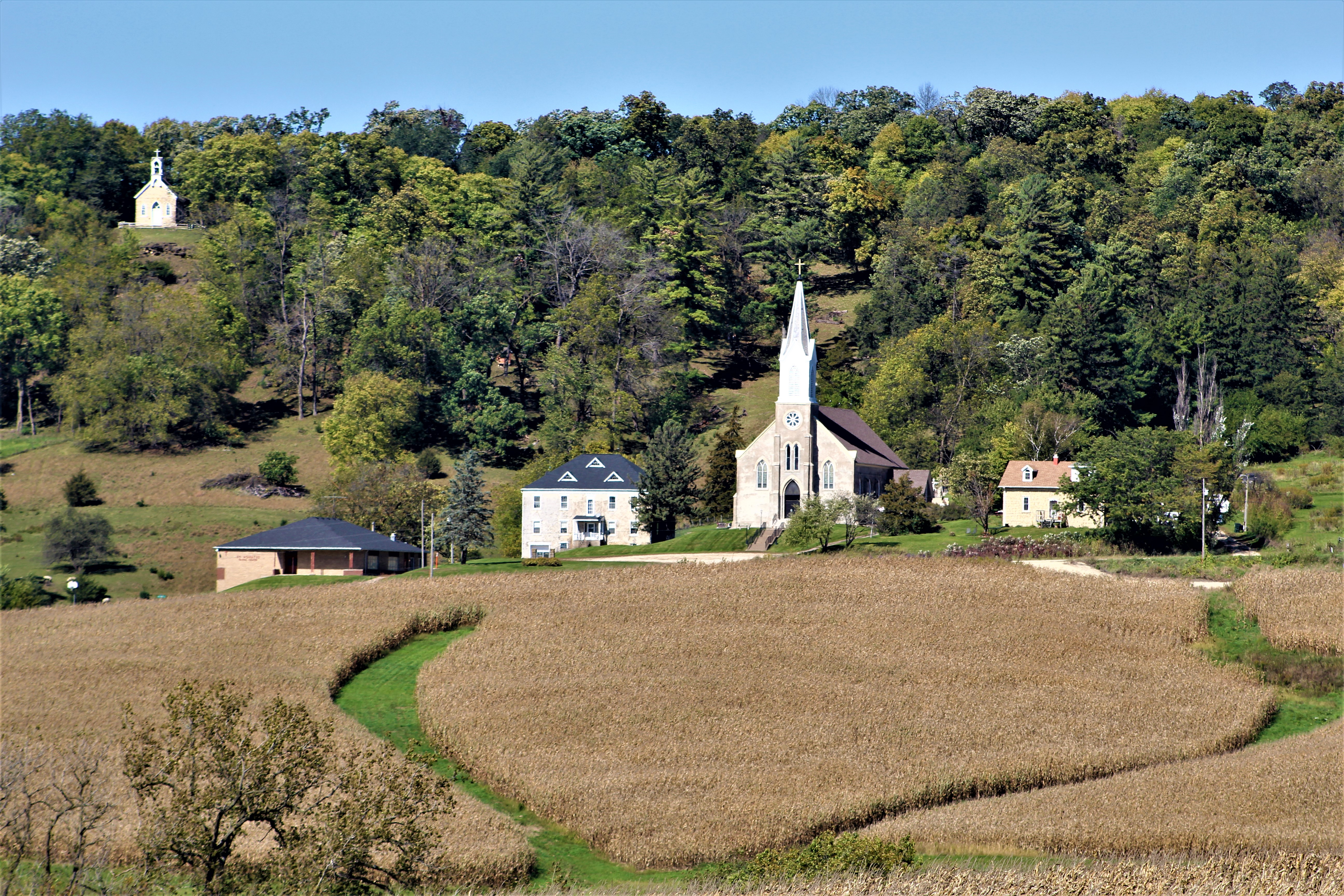
Parish complex

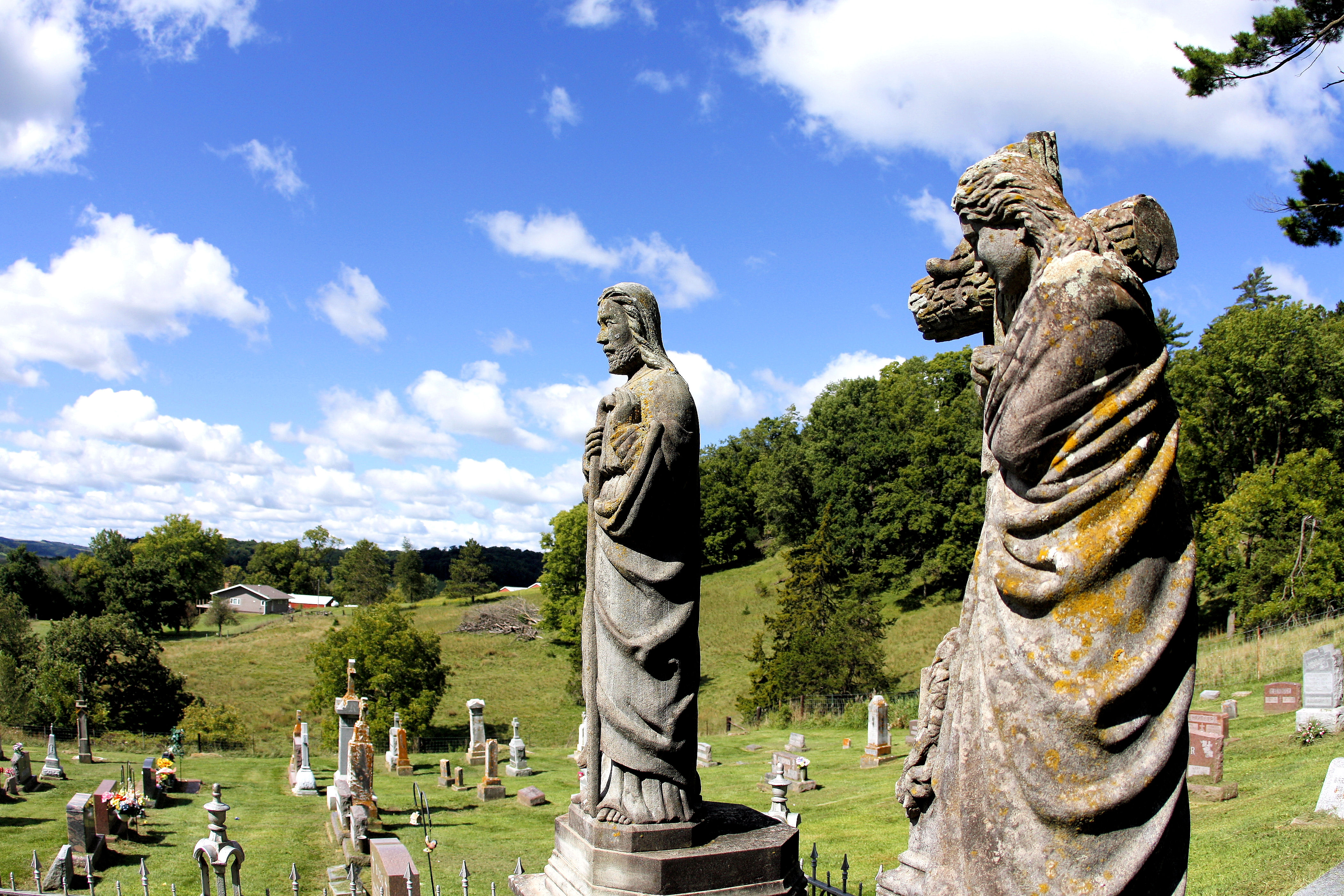
St. Donatus Cemetery

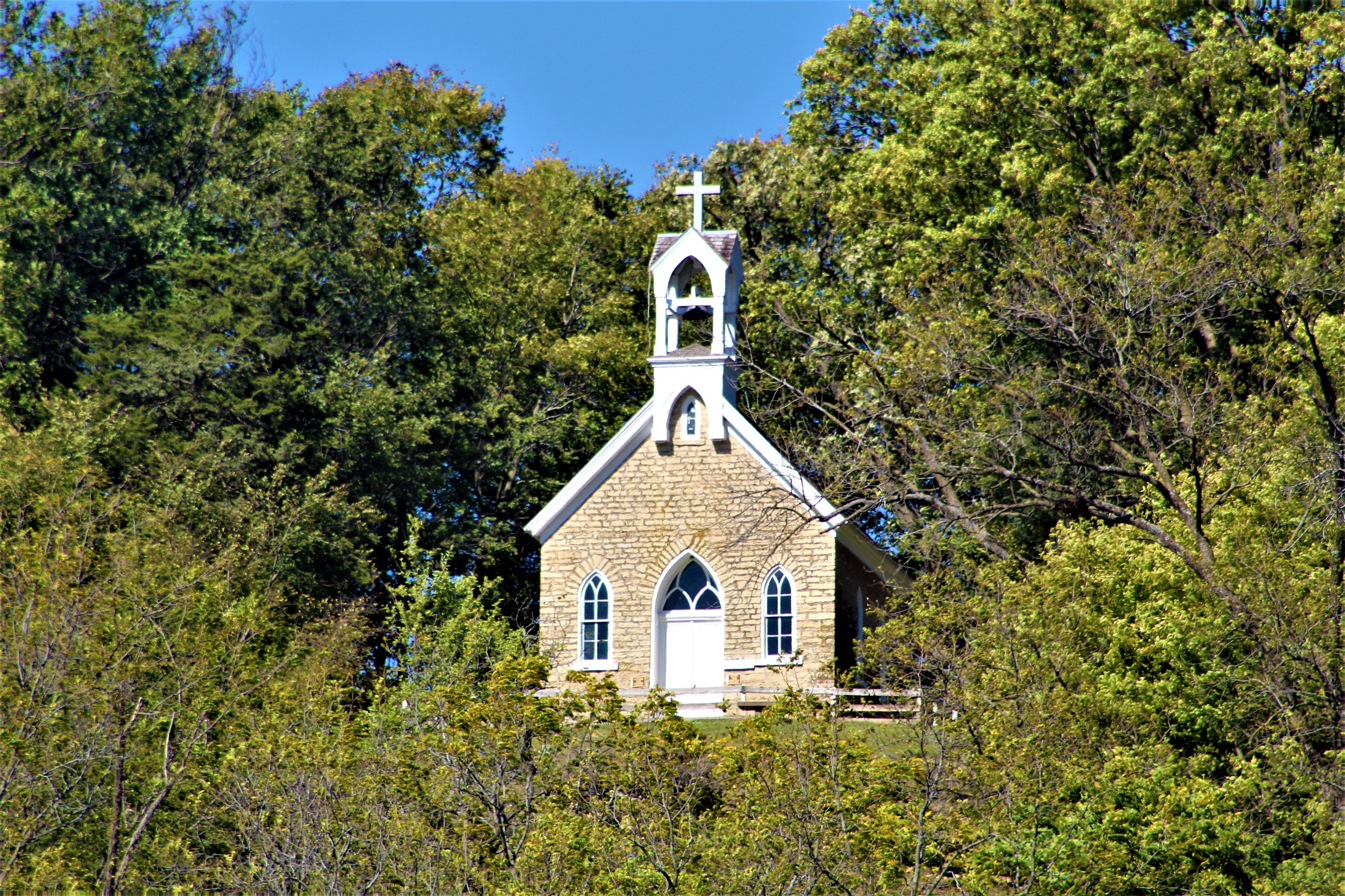
Pieta Chapel

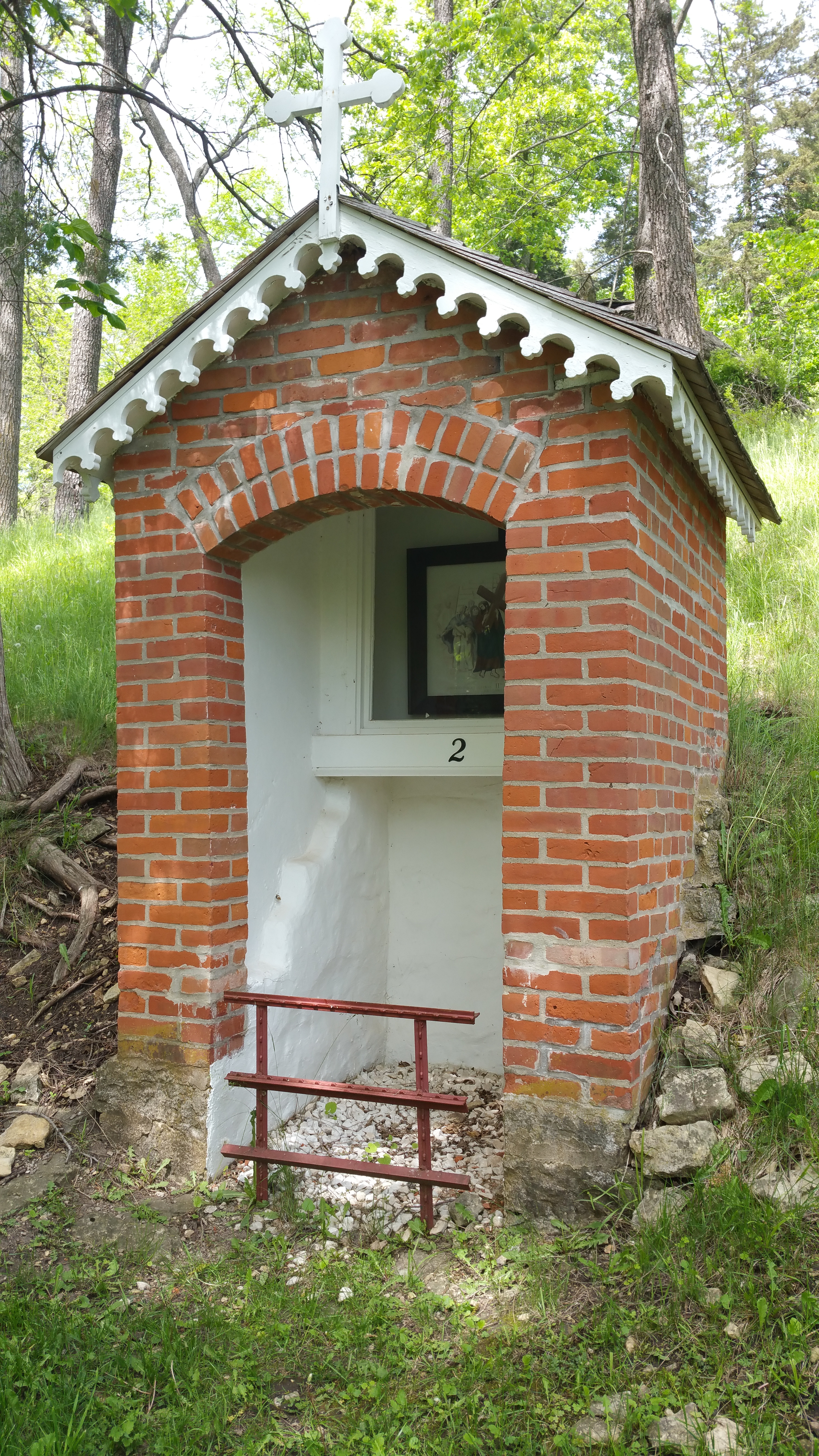
One of the outdoor Stations of the Cross
