= Fiorenza Donato =

Italian astroparticle physicist

Fiorenza Donato is an Italian theoretical astroparticle physicist whose research involves the study of cosmic rays and their use in understanding the nature of dark matter, the possible products of particle collisions involving dark matter, the creation and behavior of antimatter among high-energy cosmic particles, and gamma-ray astronomy. She is a full professor of theoretical physics at the University of Turin.

== Education and career ==
Donato graduated magna cum laude from the University of Turin in 1995, and continued at the university for a Ph.D. in physics, completed in 1998. She earned a French habilitation in 2002, and an Italian professorial habilitation in 2013.

She was a postdoctoral researcher at the Laboratoire d'Annecy-le-Vieux de physique des particules from 1998 to 2001, at the University of Turin from 2002 to 2004, and as an Alexander von Humboldt Fellow at the Max Planck Institute for Physics from 2004 to 2005.

She continued as a researcher at the University of Turin, becoming an associate professor there in 2015 and full professor in 2021.

== Recognition ==
Donato was elected as a Fellow of the American Physical Society (APS) in 2015, after a nomination from the APS Division of Astrophysics, "for extensive ground breaking contributions in astro particle physics and indirect dark matter searches". She became a corresponding member of the Accademia delle Scienze di Torino in 2021.
