= San Donato, Santa Maria a Monte =

San Donato
- Frazione
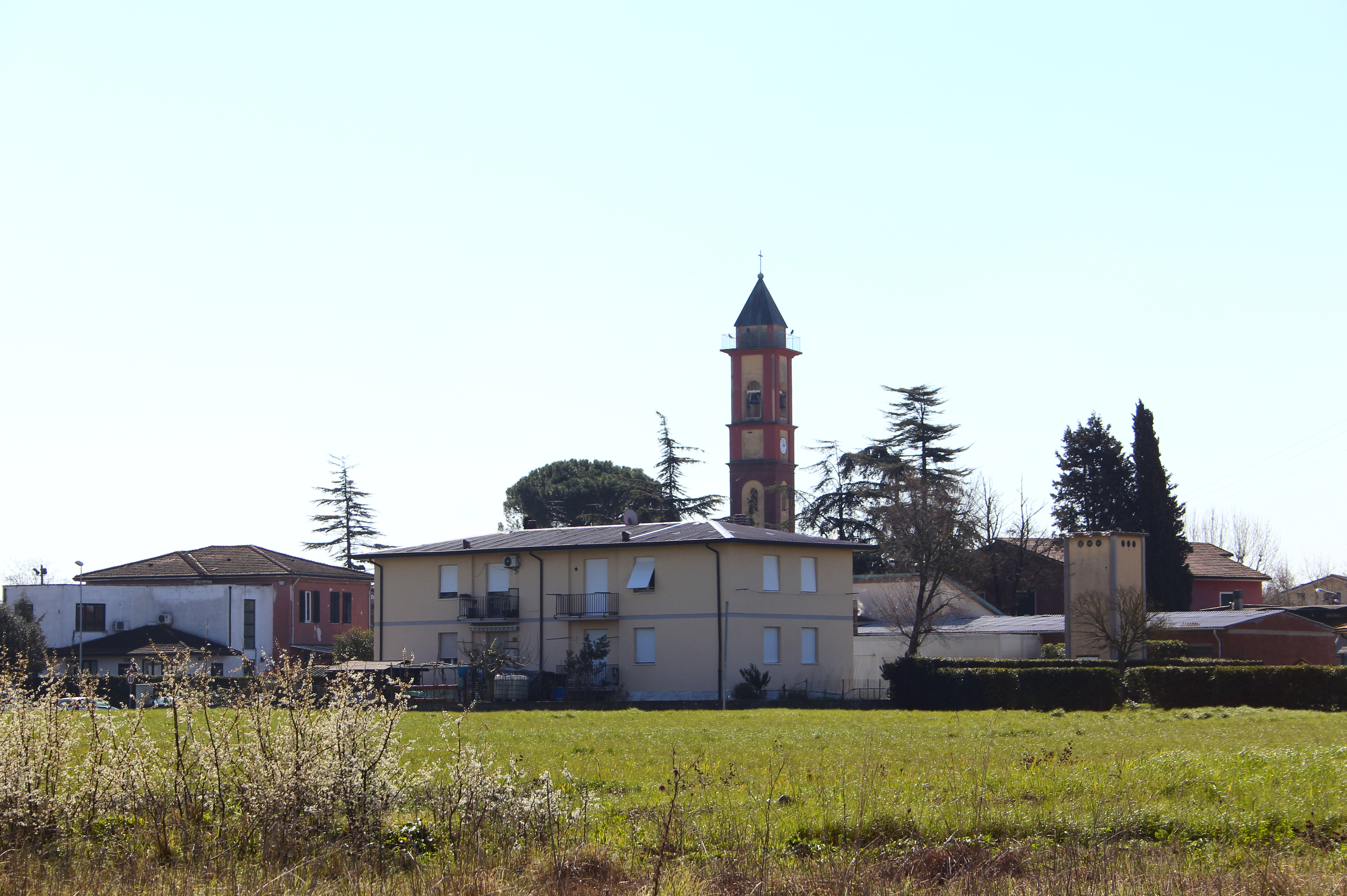

- Location of San Donato in Italy
- Coordinates: 43°40′36″N 10°41′27″E
- Country: Italy
- Region: Tuscany
- Province: Pisa (PI)
- Comune: Santa Maria a Monte
- Elevation: 15 m (49 ft)

Population (2011)
  - Total: 661
- Time zone: UTC+1 (CET)
  - Summer (DST): UTC+2 (CEST)
- Postal code: 56020
- Dialing code: (+39) 0587

San Donato is a village in Tuscany, central Italy, administratively a frazione of the comune of Santa Maria a Monte, province of Pisa. At the time of the 2001 census its population was 530.

San Donato is about 28 km from Pisa and 5 km from Santa Maria a Monte.
