= Specchia =

Town and comune in Italy

- Comune
- Comune di Specchia
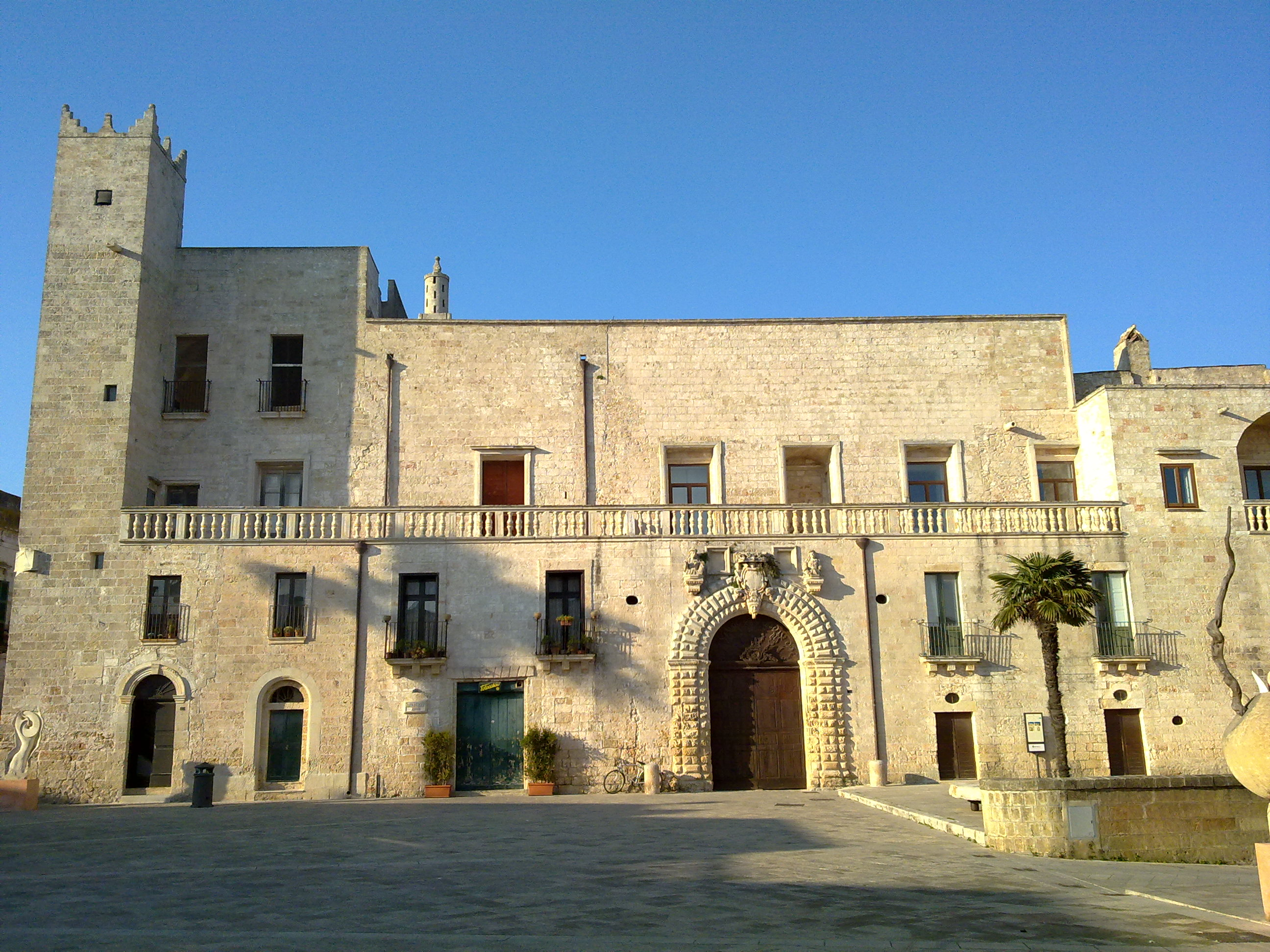
- Palazzo Risolo

- Coat of arms

- Location within Italy Location within Apulia
- Coordinates: 39°56′30″N 18°18′30″E
- Country: Italy
- Region: Apulia
- Province: Lecce (LE)

Government
  - Mayor: Antonio Biasco

Area
  - Total: 24.74 km^{2} (9.55 sq mi)
- Elevation: 131 m (430 ft)

Population (31 December 2010)
  - Total: 4,912
  - Density: 198.5/km^{2} (514.2/sq mi)
- Demonym: Specchiesi
- Time zone: UTC+1 (CET)
  - Summer (DST): UTC+2 (CEST)
- Postal code: 73040
- Dialing code: 0833
- Patron saint: St. Nicholas of Bari
- Saint day: Second Sunday in May
- Website: Official website

Specchia is a town and comune in the province of Lecce in the Apulia region of southeast Italy. Located 53 km south of the province's capital, Specchia is nestled atop the Serra Magnone, one of the highest points in lower Salento. It is one of I Borghi più belli d'Italia ("The most beautiful villages of Italy").

== Main sights ==
- Mother Church (15th century)
- Church of the Francescani Neri (early 16th century)
- Baroque church of Assunta
- Church of San Nicola di Mira, founded in the 11th century but largely rebuilt in the 16th century, when it was converted to the Latin Church from the Byzantine one
- Church of Santa Eufemia (9th-10th century)
- Dominican church and convent
- Palazzo Risolo (16th century), occupying the former site of the medieval castle
- Palazzo Ripa (17th century)

== Sport ==
=== Football ===
The football team of the town is the A.S.D. ARMANDO PICCHI SPECCHIA that competes in the "girone B magliese" of the Seconda Categoria. It was founded in the 1970.

== International relations ==
Specchia is twinned with:

- (Poland) Busko-Zdrój
- (Hungary) Szigetszentmiklós
