= San Donato di Ninea =

- Comune
- Comune di San Donato di Ninea
- Location within Italy Location within Calabria
- Coordinates: 39°42′N 16°03′E
- Country: Italy
- Region: Calabria
- Province: Cosenza (CS)
- Frazioni: Policastrello

Government
  - Mayor: Jim Di Giorno (since May 2019)

Area
  - Total: 82.4 km^{2} (31.8 sq mi)
- Elevation: 720 m (2,360 ft)

Population (April 2024)
  - Total: 1,066
  - Density: 12.9/km^{2} (33.5/sq mi)
- Demonym: Sandonatesi
- Time zone: UTC+1 (CET)
  - Summer (DST): UTC+2 (CEST)
- Postal code: 87010
- Dialing code: 0981
- Patron saint: Saint Donatus of Arezzo
- Website: Official website

San Donato di Ninea (Greek: Nymphaea) is a town and comune in the province of Cosenza in the Calabria region of southern Italy.

In 1602 the Spanish King Philip III, invested it as a dukedom to the Sanseverino dynasty, founded by the Princes of Bisignano and Princes of Salerno.

== Twin towns ==
- Montesano Salentino, Italy
- Fiorano Modenese, Italy
