= Calvera =

- Comune
- Comune di Calvera
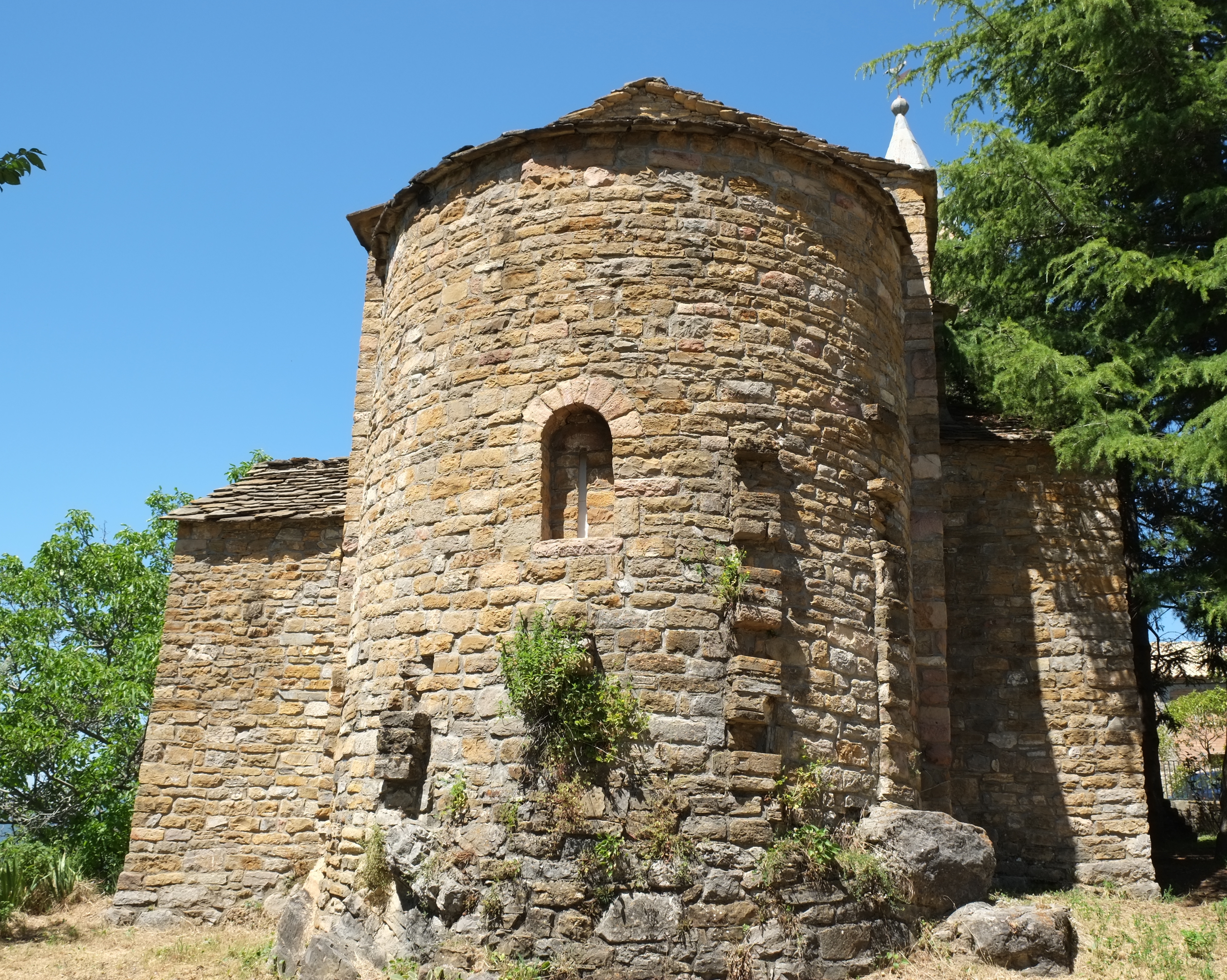
- View of Calvera

- Location within Italy Location within Basilicata
- Coordinates: 40°09′N 16°09′E
- Country: Italy
- Region: Basilicata
- Province: Potenza (PZ)
- Frazioni: Vallina

Government
  - Mayor: Pasquale Bartolomeo

Area
  - Total: 15 km^{2} (5.8 sq mi)

Population (January 1, 2025)
  - Total: 352
  - Density: 23/km^{2} (61/sq mi)
- Demonym: Calveresi
- Time zone: UTC+1 (CET)
  - Summer (DST): UTC+2 (CEST)
- Postal code: 85030
- Dialing code: 0973
- ISTAT code: 076016
- Patron saint: Saint Cajetan
- Saint day: August 7
- Website: Official website

Calvera (Lucano: Càlavìrë) is a city and comune in the province of Potenza, southern Italy.
