= Quirinus (Africa) =

Saint Quirinus (Africa)

Martyr
- Venerated in: Roman Catholic Church
- Feast: 3 June

Quirinus is venerated as a martyr and saint of the Catholic Church. He died together with Abidianus and Papocinicus in Africa.
