= Montesano Salentino =

Montesano Salentinoo IATA
- Comune
- Comune di Montesano Salentino -
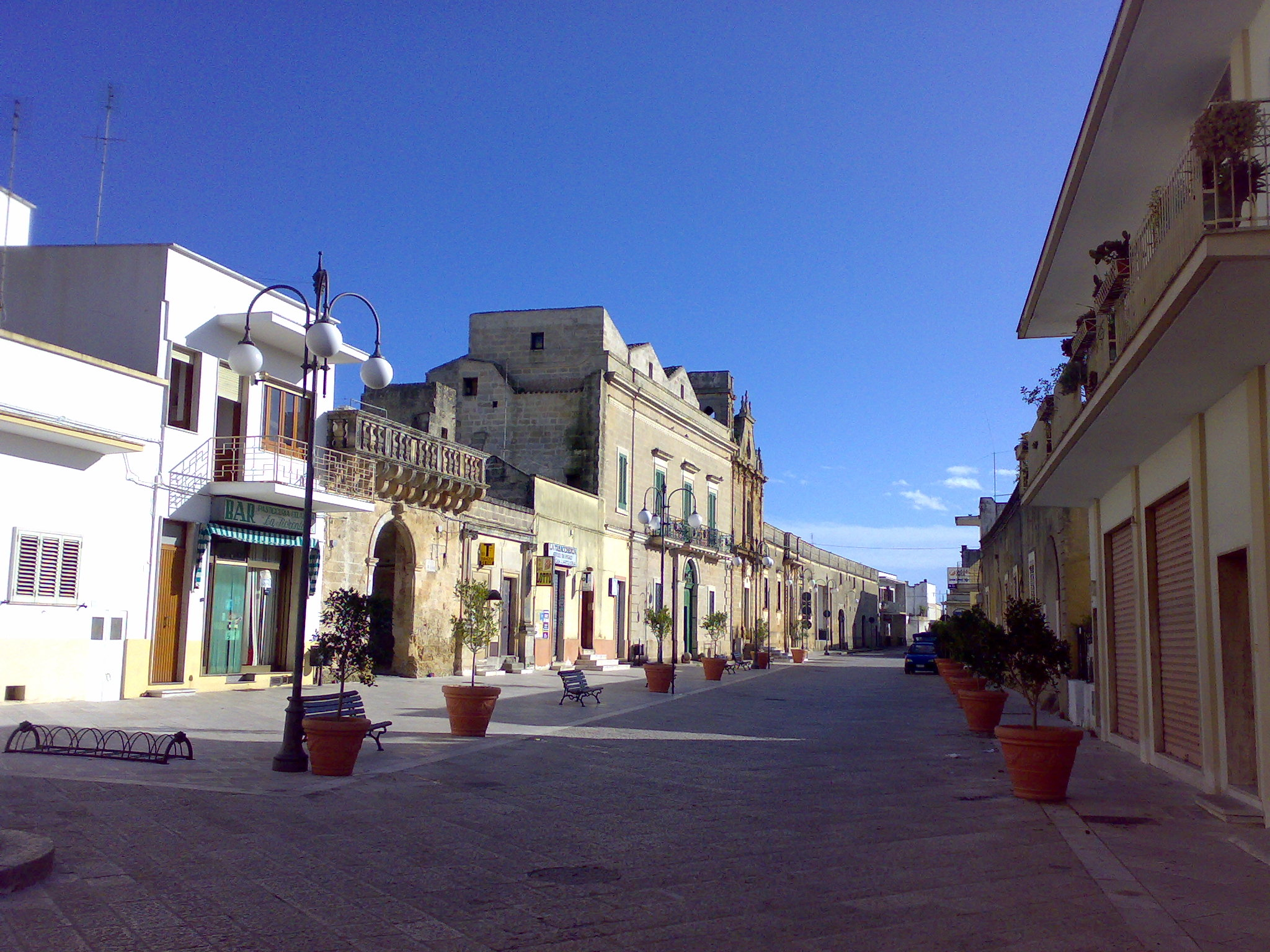

- Location within Italy Location within Apulia
- Coordinates: 39°58′32.83″N 18°19′21.40″E
- Country: Italy
- Region: Apulia
- Province: Lecce (LE)

Government
  - Mayor: Giuseppe Maglie

Area
  - Total: 8 km^{2} (3.1 sq mi)
- Elevation: 106 m (348 ft)

Population (30 November 2017)
  - Total: 2,691
  - Density: 340/km^{2} (870/sq mi)
- Demonym: Montesanesi
- Time zone: UTC+1 (CET)
  - Summer (DST): UTC+2 (CEST)
- Postal code: 73030
- Dialing code: 0833
- ISTAT code: 075049
- Patron saint: Saint Donatus of Arezzo
- Saint day: 7 August
- Website: Official website

Montesano Salentino (Salentino: Muntesànu) is a town and comune in the province of Lecce in the Apulia region of south-east Italy.

== Twin towns ==
- San Donato di Ninea, Italy
- Gallikos, Greece
